= Guildhall (disambiguation) =

A guildhall or guild hall is either a town hall or a building historically used by guilds for meetings.

Guildhall can also refer to:

- Guild Hall of East Hampton, a cultural institution in New York, United States
- Guildhall, Derry, a building in Northern Ireland
- Guildhall, London, a building in the City of London, England
- Guildhall, Vermont, a town in and the shire town (county seat) of Essex County, Vermont, United States
- Guildhall Leisure Services, a publisher of Amiga video games
- Guildhall School of Music and Drama, a school in London
- Middlesex Guildhall, a building currently housing the Supreme Court of the United Kingdom
- Preston Guild Hall, an entertainment venue in Lancashire, England
- The Guildhall at SMU, a school for developing digital entertainment, United States
- York Guildhall, a Grade I-listed building in York, England
  - York Guildhall Annex, a Grade II*-listed complex that adjoins the Guildhall
