= 2003 City of York Council election =

City of York Council Election, 2003
- 1 May 2003

All 47 seats to City of York Council 24 seats needed for a majority
	First party	Second party	Third party
Leader	Steve Galloway	Dave Merrett	Andy D'Agorne
Party	Liberal Democrats	Labour	Green
Leader since	1999	2002	N/A
Leader's seat	Westfield	Micklegate (Note: Previously a councillor in the Bishophill ward, which was abolished in the boundary redrawing.)	Fishergate (Note: Was not previously a councillor, but ran for this seat and won.)
Last election	22	27	0
Seats before	24	25	0
Seats won	29	15	2
Seat change	▲7	▼12	▲2
Popular vote	58,239	31,113	7,554
Percentage	49.0%	26.2%	6.3%
	Fourth party	Fifth party
Leader		John Galvin
Party	Independent	Conservative
Leader since		1999
Leader's seat		Wheldrake (Note: Previously a councillor in the Copmanthorpe ward, which was abolished in the boundary redrawing.) (defeated)
Last election	1	3
Seats before	1	3
Seats won	1	0
Seat change	0	▼3
Popular vote	5,562	16,117
Percentage	4.7%	13.5%
Leader of the Council before election
Dave Merrett
Labour
Leader of the Council after election
Steve Galloway
Liberal Democrats

Elections to City of York Council were held in 2003. The whole council was up for election. Boundary changes had reduced the number of seats from 53 to 47.

The election saw York's Labour Party lose control of the council covering central York for the first time since 1984; on top of a difficult set of local elections following a backlash to the Labour government's decision to involve the country in the 2003 invasion of Iraq, the local Labour Party's image was hurt by a series of scandals that had resulted in the removal of former council leader Rod Hills less than a year prior to the election.

The Liberal Democrats won control of the council covering central York for the first time since the Liberal Party had last run the York Corporation in 1899. This election would mark a political realignment that would see the Liberal Democrats largely emerge as the pre-eminent political force on the council, spending all but four of the next twenty years in some way involved in controlling the council; this election would, however, mark the only time to date the party have won a majority on the council, with their periods in power generally being in coalitions with either the Green Party or Conservative Party.

The council was made up of 29 Liberal Democrats, 15 Labour, two Green and one independent. The Conservatives were wiped out, losing all three of the seats they had held prior to the election, as they found their vote cannibalised by the Liberal Democrats despite an otherwise favourable set of local election results nationally.

== Election result ==
City of York Council election 2003
Party	Candidates						Votes		
Party	Stood	Elected	Gained	Unseated	Net	% of total	%	No.	Net %
Liberal Democrats	47	29				61.7%	49.0%	58,239	
Labour	45	15				31.9%	26.2%	31,105	
Green	16	2				4.3%	6.3%	7,554	
Independent	7	1				2.1%	4.7%	5,562	
Conservative	27	0				0%	13.5%	16,117	
Socialist Alliance	3	0				0%	0.2%	302	
Monster Raving Loony	1	0				0%	0.1%	107	

There were boundary changes in 18 wards, which elected 41 city councillors. There were no boundary changes in 4 wards, which elected 6 city councillors.

== Ward results ==
=== Acomb ward ===
Acomb
Party	Candidate	Votes	%
Labour	Tracey Simpson-Laing *	1,051	26.3
Labour	David Horton †	1,038	26.0
Liberal Democrats	Robert Anderson	773	19.3
Liberal Democrats	Julie Hook	630	15.8
Conservative	Valmai Galvin	398	10.0
Monster Raving Loony	Graham Cambridge	107	2.7
Turnout		3,997	35.0
Labour win (new seat)			
Labour win (new seat)			

* Represented the Acomb ward of City of York Council, 1999-2003

† Represented the Acomb ward of York City Council, 1986-1996, and the Acomb ward of City of York Council, 1995-2003

=== Bishopthorpe ward ===
The parishes of Acaster Malbis and Bishopthorpe

Bishopthorpe
Party	Candidate	Votes	%
Liberal Democrats	David Livesley *	989	58.5
Conservative	Susan Williams	499	29.5
Labour	Winifred Atkinson	202	12.0
Turnout		1,690	53.6
Liberal Democrats win (new seat)			

* Represented the Copmanthorpe ward of City of York Council, 1999-2003

=== Clifton ward ===
Clifton
Party	Candidate	Votes	%
Labour	Alan Jones *	1,065	14.4
Labour	Kenneth King †	977	13.2
Labour	David Scott	825	11.1
Liberal Democrats	Joanna MacDonald	807	10.9
Liberal Democrats	Simon Tarry ‡	804	10.8
Liberal Democrats	Samantha Waudby	724	9.8
Independent	John Cook	625	8.4
Independent	Leslie Marsh	612	8.3
Independent	Stephen Prophet	546	7.4
Green	William Shaw	430	5.7
Turnout		7,415	27.8
Labour win (new seat)			
Labour win (new seat)			
Labour win (new seat)			

* Represented the Clifton ward of York City Council, 1994-1996, and the Clifton ward of City of York Council, 1995-2003

† Represented the Bootham ward of York City Council, 1982-1996, the Fishergate division of North Yorkshire County Council, 1985-1989, and the Bootham ward of City of York Council, 1995-2003

‡ Represented the Clifton Without ward of Ryedale District Council, 1991-1996, and the Clifton Without ward of City of York Council, 1995-2003

=== Derwent ward ===
The parishes of Dunnington, Holtby, and Kexby

Derwent
Party	Candidate	Votes	%
Liberal Democrats	Janet Greenwood *	808	56.6
Conservative	Jenny Brooks	491	34.4
Labour	Lesley Della Gana	128	9.0
Turnout		1,427	48.7
Liberal Democrats win (new seat)			

* Represented the Dunnington and Kexby ward of City of York Council, 1999-2003

=== Dringhouses and Woodthorpe ward ===
Dringhouses and Woodthorpe
Party	Candidate	Votes	%
Liberal Democrats	Ann Reid *	2,052	19.5
Liberal Democrats	Susan Sunderland	1,863	17.7
Liberal Democrats	Thomas Holvey	1,704	16.2
Labour	Bernard Bell †	1,009	9.6
Labour	Richard Cregan ‡	829	7.9
Conservative	Monica Garrity	813	7.7
Labour	Gerard Hodgson	794	7.5
Conservative	Alan Deanes	755	7.2
Conservative	John Naylor	703	6.7
Turnout		10,522	41.5
Liberal Democrats win (new seat)			
Liberal Democrats win (new seat)			
Liberal Democrats win (new seat)			

* Represented the Foxwood ward of York City Council, 1990-1996, and the Foxwood ward of City of York Council, 1995-2003

† Represented the Walmgate ward of York City Council, 1980-1988, and the Heworth ward of York City Council, 1990-1996, and the Micklegate ward of City of York Council, 1995-2003

‡ Represented the Beckfield ward of City of York Council, 1995-2003

=== Fishergate ward ===
Fishergate
Party	Candidate	Votes	%
Green	Andy D'Agorne	1,093	25.6
Green	Mark Hill	1,028	24.1
Labour	John Boardman *	555	13.0
Conservative	Robin Dickson †	533	12.5
Labour	Roger Farrington ‡	472	11.1
Liberal Democrats	Karen Dunk	321	7.5
Liberal Democrats	Derek Waudby	265	6.2
Turnout		4,267	38.0
Green win (new seat)			
Green win (new seat)			

* Represented the Fishergate ward of York City Council, 1988-1996, and the Fishergate ward of City of York Council, 1995-2003

† Represented the Fishergate division of North Yorkshire County Council, 1989-1993

‡ Represented the Fishergate division of North Yorkshire County Council, 1993-1996, and the Fishergate ward of City of York Council, 1995-2003

=== Fulford ward ===
The parish of Fulford

Fulford
Party	Candidate	Votes	%	±%
Liberal Democrats	Keith Aspden	491	48.4	28.1
Labour	Alan Smith	285	28.1	−17.7
Conservative	Walter Davy	162	16.0	−17.8
Green	Helen Kenwright	76	7.5	7.5
Turnout		1,014	47.3	6.9
Liberal Democrats gain from Labour				

There were no boundary changes to Fulford ward.

=== Guildhall ward ===
Guildhall
Party	Candidate	Votes	%
Labour	Janet Looker *	664	22.7
Labour	Brian Watson †	564	19.3
Liberal Democrats	Nicholas Blitz ‡	532	18.2
Liberal Democrats	Philip Thomas	414	14.1
Conservative	Nicholas Toms	319	10.9
Green	Gillian Cossham	199	6.8
Green	Denise Craghill	156	5.3
Socialist Alliance	Mark Russell	78	2.7
Turnout		2,926	28.0
Labour win (new seat)			
Labour win (new seat)			

* Represented the Guildhall division of North Yorkshire County Council, 1985-1996, and the Guildhall ward of City of York Council, 1995-2003

† Represented the Acomb ward of York City Council, 1979-1984, the Guildhall ward of York City Council, 1988-1996, the Acomb division of North Yorkshire County Council, 1981-1989, and the Guildhall ward of City of York Council, 1995-2003

‡ Represented the Monk ward of City of York Council, 2000-2003

=== Haxby and Wigginton ward ===
The parishes of Haxby and Wigginton

Haxby and Wigginton
Party	Candidate	Votes	%
Liberal Democrats	Alan Hall *	2,887	26.1
Liberal Democrats	Christopher Hogg †	2,728	24.7
Liberal Democrats	Michael Watson ‡	2,528	22.9
Conservative	Robert Phillips	724	6.6
Conservative	Gareth Dadd	627	5.7
Green	Alan Robertshaw	453	4.1
Labour	Doris Bell	387	3.5
Labour	Stephen Burton	383	3.5
Labour	David Wilson	327	3.0
Turnout		11,044	41.0
Liberal Democrats win (new seat)			
Liberal Democrats win (new seat)			
Liberal Democrats win (new seat)			

* Represented the Haxby and Wigginton ward of Ryedale District Council, 1979-1983, the Wigginton ward of Ryedale District Council, 1987-1996, and the Wigginton ward of City of York Council, 1995-2003

† Represented the Haxby / Wigginton division of North Yorkshire County Council, 1993-1996, and the Haxby ward of City of York Council, 1995-2003

‡ Represented the Haxby ward of City of York Council, 1999-2003

=== Heslington ward ===
The parish of Heslington

Heslington
Party	Candidate	Votes	%	±%
Liberal Democrats	Ceredig Jamieson-Ball	381	51.8	30.5
Labour	Martin Brumby *	155	21.1	−18.3
Conservative	Richard Robeson	86	11.7	−9.7
Green	Candida Spillard	82	11.2	−6.7
Socialist Alliance	Andrew Collingwood	31	4.2	4.2
Turnout		735	19.9	−1.5
Liberal Democrats gain from Labour				

There were no boundary changes to Heslington ward.

* Represented the Heslington ward of Selby District Council, 1991-1996, and the Heslington ward of City of York Council, 1995-2003

=== Heworth ward ===
Heworth
Party	Candidate	Votes	%
Labour	Vivienne Kind *	1,483	18.8
Labour	Paul Blanchard	1,381	17.5
Labour	Ruth Potter †	1,300	16.5
Liberal Democrats	Nigel Ayre	1,020	13.0
Liberal Democrats	Matthew Reid	924	11.7
Liberal Democrats	Ian Packington	777	9.9
Conservative	Patricia Kay	613	7.8
Green	David Layfield	377	4.8
Turnout		7,875	32.5
Labour win (new seat)			
Labour win (new seat)			
Labour win (new seat)			

* Represented the Monk ward of City of York Council, 1995-2003

† Represented the Beckfield ward of City of York Council, 1999-2003

=== Heworth Without ward ===
The parish of Heworth Without

Heworth Without
Party	Candidate	Votes	%
Liberal Democrats	Martin Lancelott	708	49.9
Conservative	William Bennett	470	33.1
Labour	David Thompson	240	16.9
Turnout		1,418	44.3
Liberal Democrats win (new seat)			

=== Holgate ward ===
Holgate
Party	Candidate	Votes	%
Liberal Democrats	Martin Bartlett	1,626	17.8
Liberal Democrats	Charles Fairclough	1,604	17.5
Liberal Democrats	Gilbert Nimmo	1,392	15.2
Labour	Elizabeth Edge *	1,357	14.8
Labour	Peter Finlay	1,239	13.5
Labour	Annie Thompson	1,074	11.7
Conservative	Nicholas Major	441	4.8
Green	Mark Nicholson	424	4.6
Turnout		9,157	36.1
Liberal Democrats win (new seat)			
Liberal Democrats win (new seat)			
Liberal Democrats win (new seat)			

* Represented the Holgate ward of City of York Council, 1995-2003

=== Hull Road ward ===
Hull Road
Party	Candidate	Votes	%
Labour	Derek Smallwood *	680	21.3
Labour	David Wilde †	678	21.2
Independent	Gordon Campbell-Thomas	435	13.6
Conservative	Duncan Flynn	390	12.2
Liberal Democrats	Kevin Dunk	360	11.3
Liberal Democrats	Susan Willer	343	10.7
Green	John Cossham	313	9.8
Turnout		3,199	27.1
Labour win (new seat)			
Labour win (new seat)			

* Represented the Guildhall ward of York City Council, 1990-1996, the Walmgate division of North Yorkshire County Council, 1985-1996, and the Walmgate ward of City of York Council, 1995-2003

† Represented the Walmgate ward of York City Council, 1973-1996, and the Walmgate ward of City of York Council, 1995-2003

=== Huntington and New Earswick ward ===
The parishes of Huntington and New Earswick

Huntington and New Earswick
Party	Candidate	Votes	%	±%
Liberal Democrats	John Orrell	2,236	25.5	2.2
Liberal Democrats	Keith Hyman	2,186	24.9	1.6
Liberal Democrats	Carol Runciman *	1,969	22.4	1.9
Conservative	Paul Tumman	755	8.6	1.0
Green	Clive Woolley	608	6.9	6.9
Labour	James Alexander	531	6.1	−3.0
Labour	Geoffrey Beacon	490	5.6	−3.0
Turnout		8,775	34.7	2.5
Liberal Democrats hold				
Liberal Democrats hold				
Liberal Democrats hold				

There were no boundary changes to Huntington and New Earswick ward.

* Represented the Huntington and New Earswick ward of City of York Council, 1999-2003

=== Micklegate ward ===
Micklegate
Party	Candidate	Votes	%
Labour	Alexander Fraser	1,268	15.4
Labour	David Merrett *	1,260	15.3
Labour	David Evans †	1,198	14.5
Green	Andrew Chase	734	8.9
Liberal Democrats	Simon Blackburn	654	7.9
Green	Anthony Martin	599	7.3
Liberal Democrats	Gillian Thompson	599	7.3
Liberal Democrats	Ian Bunting	595	7.2
Green	David King	579	7.0
Conservative	Christopher Megone	565	6.9
Socialist Alliance	Robert Looker	193	2.3
Turnout		8,224	32.6
Labour win (new seat)			
Labour win (new seat)			
Labour win (new seat)			

* Represented the Bishophill ward of York City Council, 1982-1996, and the Bishophill ward of City of York Council, 1995-2003

† Represented the Bishophill ward of City of York Council, 2001-2003

=== Osbaldwick ward ===
The parishes of Murton and Osbaldwick

Osbaldwick
Party	Candidate	Votes	%
Liberal Democrats	Jonathan Morley *	514	50.3
Independent	Gerald Grisdale	391	38.3
Labour	Andrew Garbutt	117	11.4
Turnout		1,022	39.5
Liberal Democrats win (new seat)			

* Represented the Osbaldwick / Heworth division of North Yorkshire County Council, 1985-1996, and the Osbaldwick ward of City of York Council, 1999-2003

=== Rural West York ward ===
The parishes of Askham Bryan, Askham Richard, Copmanthorpe, Hessay, Nether Poppleton, Rufforth with Knapton, and Upper Poppleton

Rural West York
Party	Candidate	Votes	%
Independent	Janet Hopton *	2,100	19.0
Liberal Democrats	Quentin MacDonald †	1,685	15.3
Liberal Democrats	Glen Bradley	1,405	12.7
Conservative	Adam Sinclair	1,336	12.1
Liberal Democrats	Carole Green	1,316	11.9
Conservative	John Gillies	1,212	11.0
Conservative	George Thomson-Smith	1,016	9.2
Labour	Annette Brumby	527	4.8
Labour	Iain Simpson-Laing	440	4.0
Turnout		11,037	43.9
Independent win (new seat)			
Liberal Democrats win (new seat)			
Liberal Democrats win (new seat)			

* Represented the Upper Poppleton ward of City of York Council, 1999-2003

† Represented the Upper Poppleton ward of City of York Council, 1995-2003

=== Skelton, Rawcliffe, and Clifton Without ward ===
The parishes of Clifton Without, Rawcliffe, and Skelton

Skelton, Rawcliffe, and Clifton Without
Party	Candidate	Votes	%
Liberal Democrats	Irene Waudby *	1,912	20.8
Liberal Democrats	Mark Waudby †	1,630	17.8
Liberal Democrats	Richard Moore	1,534	16.7
Independent	Victor Paylor	853	9.3
Labour	Anthony Ireland	645	7.0
Conservative	Peter Gibson	589	6.4
Conservative	Andrew Kay	562	6.1
Labour	Matthew Page	536	5.8
Labour	Maureen Smith	518	5.6
Green	Andrew Dearden	403	4.4
Turnout		9,182	33.6
Liberal Democrats win (new seat)			
Liberal Democrats win (new seat)			
Liberal Democrats win (new seat)			

* Represented the Rawcliffe division of North Yorkshire County Council, 1989-1996, and the Rawcliffe and Skelton ward of City of York Council, 1995-2003

† Represented the Rawcliffe and Skelton ward of City of York Council, 1999-2003

=== Strensall ward ===
The parishes of Earswick, Stockton-on-the-Forest, and Strensall with Towthorpe

Strensall
Party	Candidate	Votes	%
Liberal Democrats	Madeleine Kirk *	1,113	29.7
Liberal Democrats	Ian Cuthbertson	996	26.5
Conservative	Jonathan Moore	686	18.3
Conservative	William Hanbury	599	16.0
Labour	Robert Guthrie	191	5.1
Labour	Karl Smith	167	4.5
Turnout		3,752	32.3
Liberal Democrats win (new seat)			
Liberal Democrats win (new seat)			

* Represented the Skelton ward of Ryedale District Council, 1991-1996, and the Strensall ward of City of York Council, 1996-2003

=== Westfield ward ===
Westfield
Party	Candidate	Votes	%
Liberal Democrats	Stephen Galloway *	2,291	26.3
Liberal Democrats	Andrew Waller †	2,154	24.7
Liberal Democrats	Susan Galloway ‡	2,013	23.1
Labour	Paul Baptie	697	8.0
Labour	Thomas Gibson	641	7.3
Labour	James Tipton	613	7.0
Conservative	Kenneth Beavan §	314	3.6
Turnout		8,723	31.5
Liberal Democrats win (new seat)			
Liberal Democrats win (new seat)			
Liberal Democrats win (new seat)			

* Represented the Westfield ward of York City Council, 1979-1996, the Westfield division of North Yorkshire County Council, 1993-1996, and the Westfield ward of City of York Council, 1995-2003

† Represented the Westfield ward of York City Council, 1994-1996, and the Westfield ward of City of York Council, 1999-2003

‡ Represented the Westfield ward of York City Council, 1973-1979, the Foxwood ward of York City Council, 1979-1996, the Westfield division of North Yorkshire County Council, 1973-1985, the Foxwood division of North Yorkshire County Council, 1985-1996, and the Foxwood ward of City of York Council, 1995-2003

§ Represented the Micklegate ward of York City Council, 1991-1996

=== Wheldrake ward ===
The parishes of Deighton, Elvington, Naburn, and Wheldrake

Wheldrake
Party	Candidate	Votes	%	±%
Liberal Democrats	Christian Vassie	982	62.7	27.1
Conservative	John Galvin *	459	29.3	−9.9
Labour	Edward Gouge	124	7.9	−17.2
Turnout		1,565	50.5	6.5
Liberal Democrats gain from Conservative				

There were no boundary changes to Wheldrake ward.

* Represented the Copmanthorpe ward of City of York Council, 1999-2003
