= 2023 City of York Council election =

2023 council election in York, England

- 4 May 2023

All 47 seats to City of York Council 24 seats needed for a majority
- Turnout: 39.1%

	First party	Second party	Third party
Leader	Claire Douglas	Nigel Ayre	Paul Doughty
Party	Labour	Liberal Democrats	Conservative
Leader's seat	Heworth	Heworth Without	Strensall (defeated)
Last election	17	21	2
Seats before	17	21	2
Seats won	24	19	3
Seat change	▲7	▼2	▲1
Popular vote	55,995	41,080	18,191
Percentage	42.4%	31.1%	13.8%
Swing	▲14.0%	▼3.4%	▼1.7%
	Fourth party	Fifth party
Leader		Andy D'Agorne
Party	Independent	Green
Leader's seat		Fishergate (defeated)
Last election	3	4
Seats before	4	3
Seats won	1	0
Seat change	▼2	▼4
Popular vote	1,898	14,665
Percentage	1.4%	11.1%
Swing	▼2.3%	▼5.9%
- Map of results of 2023 election
Leader before election
Keith Aspden
Liberal Democrats
No overall control
Leader
Claire Douglas
Labour

Elections to City of York Council took place on 4 May 2023, as part of the United Kingdom local elections. They were held on the same day as other local elections in England. The incumbent leader of the council and leader of the Liberal Democrats, Keith Aspden did not stand for re-election, with it being announced ahead of the elections that Nigel Ayre would be the Liberal Democrats' new leader.

At the election Labour took a majority of the seats on the council. While the Liberal Democrats had a net loss of only two seats, they were rendered unable to continue in power after their coalition partners, the Green Party, lost all their seats on the council. The Conservative Party, who had led the council in a coalition with the Liberal Democrats between 2015 and 2019, made only a minor recovery with a net gain of one seat. The Labour Party took seven seats, and was able to form an administration with a majority of one. At the subsequent annual council meeting on 25 May 2023 the Labour leader, Claire Douglas, was appointed the new leader of the council.

== Results summary ==
Results Map of the 2023 City of York Council Election.

City of York Council
Party	Candidates						Votes		
Party	Stood	Elected	Gained	Unseated	Net	% of total	%	No.	Net %
Labour	47	24	7	0	▲7	51.1	42.4	55,995	+14.0
Liberal Democrats	47	19	1	3	▼2	40.4	31.1	41,080	–3.4
Conservative	45	3	2	1	▲1	6.4	13.8	18,191	–1.7
Independent	5	1	0	2	▼2	2.1	1.4	1,898	–2.3
Green	47	0	0	4	▼4	0.0	11.1	14,655	–5.9
Yorkshire	1	0	0	0	Steady	0.0	0.1	154	N/A
TUSC	1	0	0	0	Steady	0.0	0.1	141	N/A

== Ward results ==
Sitting councillors are marked with an asterisk (*).

=== Acomb ward ===
Acomb (2 seats)
Party	Candidate	Votes	%	±%
Labour Co-op	Katie Lomas *	1,506	69.9	+24.7
Labour Co-op	Jason Rose	1,364	63.3	+21.5
Conservative	Nigel Bromley	373	17.3	−6.8
Conservative	Matthew Greenwood	343	15.9	−1.7
Green	Luke Richardson †	189	8.8	−4.4
Green	Michael Kearney	173	8.0	−3.0
Liberal Democrats	Tobie Abel	141	6.5	−1.8
Liberal Democrats	Matthew Smithson	112	5.2	−0.6
Turnout		2,155	31.4	−5.3
Rejected ballots		11		
Labour hold				
Labour hold				

* Represented the Acomb ward of City of York Council, 2019-2023
† Represented the Pickering West ward of Ryedale District Council, 2011-2015

=== Bishopthorpe ward ===
The parishes of Acaster Malbis and Bishopthorpe

Bishopthorpe
Party	Candidate	Votes	%	±%
Conservative	Michael Nicholls	590	34.4	+13.5
Green	Carole Green	546	31.9	+0.6
Liberal Democrats	Chris Gammie	367	21.4	+15.6
Labour	Steven Spencer	210	12.3	+3.3
Turnout		1,713	51.6	±0.0
Rejected ballots		5		
Conservative gain from Independent				

=== Clifton ward ===
Clifton (2 seats)
Party	Candidate	Votes	%	±%
Labour	Danny Myers *	1,371	67.2	+8.9
Labour	Margaret Wells *	1,221	59.9	+9.1
Liberal Democrats	Michael Maybridge	298	14.6	+3.7
Liberal Democrats	Mark Waudby †	269	13.2	+4.5
Conservative	Charlotte Milligan	214	10.5	−6.4
Conservative	Joe Pattinson	212	10.4	−5.0
Green	Amanda Brook	183	9.0	−9.4
Independent	Andrew Dickinson	117	5.7	New
Green	Richard Sharp	114	5.6	−8.9
Turnout		2,039	30.2	−3.6
Rejected ballots		5		
Labour hold				
Labour hold				

* Represented the Clifton ward of City of York Council, 2015-2023

† Represented the Rawcliffe and Skelton ward of City of York Council, 1999-2003, and the Skelton, Rawcliffe, and Clifton Without ward of City of York Council, 2003-2007

=== Copmanthorpe ward ===
The parish of Copmanthorpe

Copmanthorpe
Party	Candidate	Votes	%	±%
Conservative	Chris Steward *	421	29.1	+11.1
Independent	David Carr †	388	26.8	−19.4
Liberal Democrats	Richard Brown	255	17.6	−0.1
Labour	Ann Moxon	198	13.7	+6.8
Green	Lars Kramm ‡	187	12.9	+1.8
Turnout		1,449	43.6	+0.7
Rejected ballots		3		
Conservative gain from Independent				

* Represented the Rural West York ward of City of York Council, 2011-2019

† Represented the Copmanthorpe ward of City of York Council, 2015-2023

‡ Represented the Micklegate ward of City of York Council, 2015-2019

=== Dringhouses and Woodthorpe ward ===
Dringhouses and Woodthorpe (3 seats)
Party	Candidate	Votes	%	±%
Liberal Democrats	Stephen Fenton *	2,233	61.0	+3.3
Liberal Democrats	Paula Widdowson †	2,026	55.3	+1.0
Liberal Democrats	Ashley Mason *	1,955	53.4	−0.6
Labour	Samuel Kind	880	24.0	+7.1
Labour	Bob Scrase ‡	840	22.9	+6.5
Labour	Kataya McKeever-Willis	828	22.6	+6.5
Conservative	Clive Hibbert	479	13.1	+2.0
Conservative	David Stuart	405	11.1	+0.4
Conservative	Timothy Ashman	403	11.0	+0.8
Green	Bronwen Gray	253	6.9	−2.9
Green	Ginevra House	247	6.7	−0.5
Green	John Gray	192	5.2	−1.6
Turnout		3,663	40.4	−5.6
Rejected ballots		11		
Liberal Democrats hold				
Liberal Democrats hold				
Liberal Democrats hold				

* Represented the Dringhouses and Woodthorpe ward of City of York Council, 2015-2023

† Represented the Dringhouses and Woodthorpe ward of City of York Council, 2019-2023

‡ Represented the Holgate ward of York City Council, 1992-1996, and the Holgate ward of City of York Council, 1995-2003

=== Fishergate ward ===
Fishergate (2 seats)
Party	Candidate	Votes	%	±%
Labour Co-op	Sarah Wilson	1,704	64.0	+37.4
Labour Co-op	Conrad Whitcroft	1,447	54.3	+31.6
Green	Andy D'Agorne *	855	32.1	−30.3
Green	Liam Clegg	737	27.7	−27.8
Conservative	Judith Morris	198	7.4	−1.5
Conservative	Peter Reineck	157	5.9	−0.9
Liberal Democrats	Katharine Macy	87	3.3	−2.4
Liberal Democrats	Connor Fitzgerald	79	3.0	−2.4
Turnout		2,664	44.3	+0.3
Rejected ballots		12		
Labour Co-op gain from Green				
Labour Co-op gain from Green				

* Represented the Fishergate ward of City of York Council, 2003-2023

=== Fulford and Heslington ward ===
The parish of Fulford and part of the parish of Heslington

Fulford and Heslington
Party	Candidate	Votes	%	±%
Labour	Kate Ravilious	678	47.3	+29.6
Liberal Democrats	Pamela Cullwick	514	35.8	−32.2
Conservative	Jordan Hennessy	155	10.8	+3.8
Green	Rachel Davies	87	6.1	−1.2
Turnout		1,434	44.2	−4.8
Rejected ballots		7		
Labour gain from Liberal Democrats				

=== Guildhall ward ===
Guildhall (3 seats)
Party	Candidate	Votes	%	±%
Labour Co-op	Rachel Melly *	1,707	58.9	+19.2
Labour Co-op	Tony Clarke	1,593	55.0	+17.0
Labour Co-op	Dave Merrett †	1,501	51.8	+17.1
Green	Denise Craghill ‡	901	31.1	−18.2
Green	Martina Weitsch	716	24.7	−10.8
Green	Henry Stevens	677	23.4	−8.9
Conservative	David Barratt	353	12.2	−2.0
Conservative	Matthew Freckelton	323	11.2	−2.3
Conservative	Geoffrey Widdows	320	11.0	−1.4
Liberal Democrats	Felix Andrew	172	5.9	−3.1
Liberal Democrats	Brandon Masih	134	4.6	−2.9
Liberal Democrats	Scarlett Wighton	132	4.6	−1.7
Turnout		2,896	32.5	−2.8
Labour Co-op gain from Green				
Labour Co-op hold				
Rejected ballots		11		
Labour Co-op hold				

* Represented the Holgate ward of City of York Council, 2019-2023

† Represented the Bishophill ward of York City Council, 1982-1996, the Bishophill ward of City of York Council, 1995-2003, and the Micklegate ward of City of York Council, 2003-2015

‡ Represented the Guildhall ward of City of York Council, 2015-2023

=== Haxby and Wigginton ward ===
The parishes of Haxby and Wigginton

Haxby and Wigginton (3 seats)
Party	Candidate	Votes	%	±%
Liberal Democrats	Ed Pearson *	2,056	56.91	−5.29
Liberal Democrats	Andrew Hollyer *	2,023	55.99	−6.51
Liberal Democrats	Ian Cuthbertson †	2,013	55.72	−7.98
Conservative	Jessie Secker	887	24.55	+6.55
Conservative	David Miller	828	22.92	+6.82
Conservative	James Bailey	735	20.34	+5.44
Labour	Ian Craven	562	15.55	+9.45
Labour	Janet Mather	537	14.86	+9.86
Labour	Anthony Lewis	500	13.84	+9.04
Green	Ian Lowson	203	5.62	−0.68
Green	Jessica Dixon	196	5.42	−0.88
Independent	Neil Wyatt	177	4.90	−4.5
Green	Liz Scurfield	121	3.35	−1.05
Turnout		3,613	39.3%	−8%
Rejected ballots		17		
Liberal Democrats hold				
Liberal Democrats hold				
Liberal Democrats hold				

* Represented the Haxby and Wigginton ward of City of York Council, 2019-2023

† Represented the Strensall ward of City of York Council, 2003-2007, and the Haxby and Wigginton ward of City of York Council, 2011-2023

=== Heworth ward ===
Heworth (3 seats)
Party	Candidate	Votes	%	±%
Labour Co-op	Claire Douglas *	2,149	75.59	+23.49
Labour Co-op	Ben Burton	1,890	66.48	+22.08
Labour Co-op	Robert Webb *	1,867	65.67	+23.47
Green	Erin Dyson	515	18.11	−2.19
Conservative	Susan Vaughan	428	15.05	−1.95
Conservative	Robert James	421	14.81	−0.09
Green	Sabine Janssen-Havercroft	340	11.96	−5.57
Green	Andy Wilson	286	10.06	−2.5
Liberal Democrats	Jonathan Morley †	252	8.86	−4.24
Liberal Democrats	Ian Murphy	140	4.92	−4.84
Liberal Democrats	Samantha Phoenix	240	8.44	−4.16
Turnout		2,843	31.7%	−1.8%
Rejected ballots		20		
Labour Co-op hold				
Labour Co-op hold				
Labour Co-op hold				

* Represented the Heworth ward of City of York Council, 2019-2023

† Represented the Osbaldwick / Heworth division of North Yorkshire County Council, 1985-1996, and the Osbaldwick ward of City of York Council, 1999-2011

=== Heworth Without ward ===
The parish of Heworth Without

Heworth Without
Party	Candidate	Votes	%	±%
Liberal Democrats	Nigel Ayre *	966	61.9	−13.9
Labour	John Moroney	321	20.6	+12.8
Conservative	Mark Fox	188	12.1	+2.9
Green	David Gibbon	85	5.4	−1.7
Turnout		1,560	46.8	−5.3
Rejected ballots		6		
Liberal Democrats hold				

* Represented the Heworth Without ward of City of York Council, 2007-2023

=== Holgate ward ===
Holgate (3 seats)
Party	Candidate	Votes	%	±%
Labour Co-op	Kallum Taylor *	2,471	78.27	+20.27
Labour Co-op	Jenny Kent	2,319	73.46	+21.56
Labour Co-op	Lucy Steels-Walshaw	2,236	70.83	+19.33
Green	Pam Hanley	383	12.13	−5.17
Conservative	Paul Bilton	375	11.88	−0.12
Conservative	Joanne Fox	318	10.07	+0.01
Green	Eleanor Glanvill	306	9.69	−7.61
Conservative	Paul Williams	288	9.12	−0.58
Liberal Democrats	Ken Cox	238	7.54	−8.96
Liberal Democrats	David Booth	216	6.84	−6.46
Green	Nick Cox	185	5.86	−9.74
Liberal Democrats	Niall McFerran	136	4.31	−7.19
Turnout		3,157	35.8%	−2.5%
Rejected ballots		20		
Labour Co-op hold				
Labour Co-op hold				
Labour Co-op hold				

* Represented the Holgate ward of City of York Council, 2018-2023

=== Hull Road ward ===
Part of the parish of Heslington

Hull Road (3 seats)
Party	Candidate	Votes	%	±%
Labour Co-op	Sophie Kelly	1,316	55.6	+9.7
Labour Co-op	Anna Baxter	1,289	54.4	+10.9
Labour Co-op	Michael Pavlovic *	1,228	51.9	+11.3
Liberal Democrats	Andrew Mortimer †	565	23.9	+12.2
Liberal Democrats	Danielle Mason	526	22.2	+10.9
Liberal Democrats	Caleb Pell	497	21.0	+12.7
Green	John Cossham	367	15.5	−12.3
Green	Nicola Normandale	336	14.2	−9.1
Green	Candi Spillard	285	12.0	−5.8
Conservative	Ellis Holden	189	8.0	−6.6
Conservative	Liping Hu	161	6.8	−7.5
Conservative	Ivan Zhou	150	6.3	−7.2
Turnout		2,368	32.1	+1.4
Rejected ballots		8		
Labour Co-op hold				
Labour Co-op hold				
Labour Co-op hold				

* Represented the Hull Road ward of City of York Council, 2017-2023
† Represented the Ripon East division of North Yorkshire County Council, 1989-1993

=== Huntington and New Earswick ward ===
The parishes of Huntington and New Earswick

Huntington and New Earswick (3 seats)
Party	Candidate	Votes	%	±%
Liberal Democrats	Keith Orrell *	1,492	45.7	−11.4
Liberal Democrats	Carol Runciman †	1,476	45.21	−11.09
Liberal Democrats	Chris Cullwick ‡	1,473	45.11	−10.89
Labour	Hughie Ferguson	1,148	35.16	+15.96
Labour	Diane Geoghegan-Breen	1,115	34.15	+16.15
Labour	Joan Whitehead	1,096	33.57	+16.77
Conservative	Stuart Rawlings §	439	13.45	+4.05
Conservative	John Wrightson	401	12.28	+3.84
Conservative	Thomas Marshall	368	11.27	+3.27
Green	Charles Everett	262	8.02	−2.38
Green	Clive Woolley	219	6.71	−3.7
Yorkshire	James Howard	154	4.72	New
Green	Dan Staples	152	4.66	−3.74
Turnout		3,265	34.3%	−3.8%
Rejected ballots		11		
Liberal Democrats hold				
Liberal Democrats hold				
Liberal Democrats hold				

* Represented the Huntington and New Earswick ward of City of York Council, 2003-2023

† Represented the Huntington and New Earswick ward of City of York Council, 1999-2023

‡ Represented the Huntington and New Earswick ward of City of York Council, 2015-2023

§ Represented the Rawcliffe and Clifton Without ward of City of York Council, 2015-2019

=== Micklegate ward ===
Micklegate (3 seats)
Party	Candidate	Votes	%	±%
Labour	Jonny Crawshaw *	3,063	73.35	+18.45
Labour	Pete Kilbane †	2,795	66.93	+23.33
Labour	Jane Burton	2,746	65.76	+25.96
Green	Daniella Findlay	874	20.93	−23.67
Green	Andreas Heinemeyer	826	19.78	−10.12
Green	David Williams	624	14.94	−9.06
Conservative	Damian Edwards	457	10.94	+0.54
Conservative	John Brewin	444	10.63	+0.43
Liberal Democrats	Martin Bartlett ‡	258	6.18	−3.17
Liberal Democrats	Harrison Daubeney	154	3.69	−4.81
Liberal Democrats	Karl Henderson	145	3.47	−3.23
TUSC	Ali Mansfield	141	3.38	New
Turnout		4,176	44.9%	−3.1%
Rejected ballots		14		
Labour hold				
Labour hold				
Labour gain from Green				

* Represented the Micklegate ward of City of York Council, 2017-2023

† Represented the Micklegate ward of City of York Council, 2019-2023

‡ Represented the Holgate ward of City of York Council, 2003-2007

=== Osbaldwick and Derwent ward ===
The parishes of Dunnington, Holtby, Kexby, Murton, and Osbaldwick

Osbaldwick and Derwent (2 seats)
Party	Candidate	Votes	%	±%
Independent	Mark Warters *	1,138	40.4	−9.5
Conservative	Martin Rowley †	927	32.9	+3.8
Liberal Democrats	Ian Eiloart ‡	739	26.2	+13.7
Liberal Democrats	Jack Worrall	578	20.5	+10.4
Labour	Jude Powell	524	18.6	+6.1
Labour	Max Abdulgani	467	16.6	+5.0
Green	Ginnie Shaw	339	12.0	−7.5
Conservative	Harvey Walker	326	11.6	−8.3
Green	Paul Hutchinson	153	5.4	−3.4
Turnout		2,816	43.2	+1.9
Independent hold				
Rejected ballots		3		
Conservative hold				

* Represented the Osbaldwick ward of City of York Council, 2011-2015, and the Osbaldwick and Derwent ward of City of York Council, 2015-2023

† Represented the Osbaldwick ward of City of York Council, 2019-2023
‡ Previously a Liberal Democrat councillor for the Lewes Priory ward of Lewes District Council

=== Rawcliffe and Clifton Without ward ===
The parishes of Clifton Without and Rawcliffe

Rawcliffe and Clifton Without (3 seats)
Party	Candidate	Votes	%	±%
Liberal Democrats	Darryl Smalley *	2,099	59.11	+3.01
Liberal Democrats	Derek Wann *	1,918	54.01	−0.39
Liberal Democrats	Sam Waudby *	1,910	53.79	−0.01
Labour	Andy Hagon	1,087	30.61	+12.21
Labour	Sam Perry	981	27.63	+10.63
Labour	Tracy White	884	24.89	+8.69
Conservative	Peter Dew †	443	12.48	−5.72
Conservative	John Betteridge	393	11.07	−7.13
Conservative	Graham Whyatt	359	10.11	−7.89
Green	Andy Dearden	197	5.55	−1.55
Green	Jill Armstrong	172	4.84	−2.69
Green	Tom Franklin	130	3.66	−1.64
Independent	Richard Coffey	78	2.2	New
Turnout		3,551	36.9%	−4.9%
Rejected ballots		12		
Liberal Democrats hold				
Liberal Democrats hold				
Liberal Democrats hold				

* Represented the Rawcliffe and Clifton Without ward of City of York Council, 2019-2023

† Represented the Rawcliffe and Clifton Without ward of City of York Council, 2015-2019

=== Rural West York ward ===
The parishes of Askham Bryan, Askham Richard, Hessay, Nether Poppleton, Rufforth with Knapton, Skelton, and Upper Poppleton

Rural West York (2 seats)
Party	Candidate	Votes	%	±%
Liberal Democrats	Anne Hook *	1,666	57.3	+2.9
Liberal Democrats	Emilie Knight	1,366	47.0	+3.4
Conservative	Arif Khalfe	899	30.9	−4.4
Conservative	Keith Myers †	813	28.0	−5.0
Labour	Tracey Hamling	370	12.7	+4.6
Labour	Gerard Hodgson ‡	320	11.0	+3.9
Green	Ginevra Gordon	147	5.1	−2.3
Green	Mark Havercroft	110	3.8	−2.1
Turnout		2,905	46.8	−1.7
Rejected ballots		3		
Liberal Democrats hold				
Liberal Democrats hold				

* Represented the Rural West York ward of City of York Council, 2019-2023

† Represented the Acomb ward of City of York Council, 2015-2019

‡ Represented the Dringhouses and Woodthorpe ward of City of York Council, 2011-2015

=== Strensall ward ===
The parishes of Earswick, Stockton-on-the-Forest, and Strensall with Towthorpe

Strensall (2 seats)
Party	Candidate	Votes	%	±%
Liberal Democrats	Tony Fisher *	1,342	60.0	+8.5
Liberal Democrats	Paul Healey †	919	41.1	+9.4
Conservative	Paul Doughty ‡	877	39.2	−2.0
Conservative	Teri Rhodes	586	26.2	−8.8
Labour	Chloe Anderson	270	12.1	+3.0
Labour	Andy Carter	182	8.1	+0.3
Green	Catherine Love-Smith	130	5.8	−3.3
Green	Ashleigh Stevens	64	2.9	−7.0
Turnout		2,236	36.0	−1.1
Rejected ballots		11		
Liberal Democrats hold				
Liberal Democrats gain from Conservative				

* Represented the Haxby West ward of Ryedale District Council, 1987-1996, and the Strensall ward of City of York Council, 2019-2023

† Represented the Rural West York ward of City of York Council, 2007-2015

‡ Represented the Strensall ward of City of York Council, 2011-2023

=== Westfield ward ===
Westfield (3 seats)
Party	Candidate	Votes	%	±%
Liberal Democrats	Andrew Waller *	1,504	45.6	−13.8
Labour	Jo Coles	1,471	44.6	+17.2
Labour	Emily Nelson	1,469	44.6	+19.3
Labour	Kerron Cross †	1,454	44.1	+19.8
Liberal Democrats	Pippa Hepworth	1,341	40.7	−13.6
Liberal Democrats	Simon Daubeney ‡	1,264	38.3	−9.7
Conservative	Patrick Ellis	241	7.3	+2.1
Green	Gillian Cossham	216	6.6	−1.8
Conservative	Janet Powell	193	5.9	+0.8
Conservative	Tet Powell	185	5.6	+1.4
Green	Mikael Hanson	164	5.0	−2.1
Green	Jonathan Tyler	155	4.7	−1.9
Turnout		3,296	32.9	−2.6
Rejected ballots		13		
Liberal Democrats hold				
Labour gain from Liberal Democrats				
Labour gain from Liberal Democrats				

* Represented the Westfield ward of York City Council, 1994-1996, and the Westfield ward of City of York Council, 1999-2011 and 2014-2023

† Represented the Hayling ward of Three Rivers District Council, 2002-2009

‡ Represented the Westfield ward of City of York Council, 2019-2023

=== Wheldrake ward ===
The parishes of Deighton, Elvington, Naburn, and Wheldrake

Wheldrake
Party	Candidate	Votes	%	±%
Liberal Democrats	Christian Vassie *	603	43.2	+9.1
Conservative	Alan Crowe	464	33.2	+4.1
Labour Co-op	David Skaith	274	19.6	+12.5
Green	Will Dyson	56	4.0	−4.5
Turnout		1,397	42.4	−4.9
Rejected ballots		5		
Liberal Democrats hold				

* Represented the Wheldrake ward of City of York Council, 2003-2011 and 2019-2023

== Changes 2023-2027 ==
- In March 2026, Mark Warters, elected as an independent councillor in Osbaldwick and Derwent, joined Restore Britain.

=== By-elections ===
Three by-elections were held to City of York Council during the 2023–2027 term.

==== Hull Road ====
The by-election was triggered by the resignation of Labour councillor Sophie Kelly, who said the demands of the role had taken too much of a toll on her personal life.

Hull Road by-election: 4 July 2024
Party	Candidate	Votes	%	±%
Labour Co-op	John Moroney	1,203	38.5	−17.1
Liberal Democrats	Andrew Mortimer	1,008	32.2	+8.3
Green	Ben Ffrench	602	19.3	+3.8
Conservative	Ellis Holden	314	10.0	+2.0
Majority		195	6.3	
Turnout		3,127	35.9	+3.8
Registered electors		8,711		
Labour Co-op hold		Swing	-12.7	

==== Haxby and Wigginton ====
The by-election was triggered by the resignation of Liberal Democrat councillor Ed Pearson, who cited work commitments and a wish to spend more time with his family and focus on his health and wellbeing.

Haxby and Wigginton by-election: 28 November 2024
Party	Candidate	Votes	%	±%
Liberal Democrats	Richard Watson	1,848	64.0	+11.1
Conservative	Jessie Secker	435	15.1	–7.7
Reform	John Crispin-Bailey	325	11.3	N/A
Labour	James Flinders	203	7.0	–7.5
Green	Ian Lowson	76	2.6	–2.6
Majority		1,413	48.9	
Turnout		2,879	29.5	–9.8
Registered electors		9,760		
Liberal Democrats hold		Swing	+9.4	

==== Heworth ====
The by-election was triggered by the resignation of Labour councillor Ben Burton and was decisive in determining control of the council.

Labour retained the seat on a reduced vote share, allowing it to retain its overall majority on the council.

Heworth by-election: 15 January 2026
Party	Candidate	Votes	%	±%
Labour	Anna Perrett	1,096	36.7	−29.8
Reform	John Crispin-Bailey	601	20.1	New
Green	Ben Ffrench	591	19.8	+1.7
Liberal Democrats	Ian Eiloart	528	17.7	+8.8
Conservative	Emma Dolben	118	4.0	−11.1
Independent	Emma Hardy	49	1.6	New
Majority		495	16.6	N/A
Turnout		2,989	31.6	−0.1
Rejected ballots		6	0.2	
Registered electors		9,467		
Labour hold		Swing	+25.0	
