= Rod Hills =

British academic and politician

Rod Hills CBE

Leader of City of York Council
- In office 1 April 1996 – 24 June 2002
- Preceded by: Position created
- Succeeded by: Dave Merrett

Personal details
- Born: 24 September 1946 Leicester, England
- Died: 28 July 2003 (aged 56) Leeds, England
- Party: Labour (1965–2002; 2003); Independent (2002–2003)
- Spouse(s): Liz Hills (divorced) Carol Wallace (died 2000)
- Children: 2
- Education: University of York

Rod I. Hills (24 September 1946 – 28 July 2003) was a British academic and Labour Party politician, who served as the leader of York City Council and then City of York Council from 1984 until 2002, when he was removed from the position and suspended from the Labour Party amidst various controversies involving his leadership style and his personal life. He retired from the council in 2003, and died two months later.

== Early life ==
Hills was born in Leicester, and spent most of his childhood in Folkestone. His father had been a Conservative Party activist, but died when Hills was 13 years old. Hills would subsequently attend the University of York, and joined the Labour Party a year later. After he graduated, Hills became a lecturer of economic and social theory at the university.

== Political career ==
Hills was first elected to York City Council in 1979, representing the Bootham ward, though due to a boundary redrawing he was forced to run again the following year, and was re-elected by a larger margin. He continued to serve was ward councillor until the council was reformed as City of York Council, whereupon he ran for the Clifton wards in 1995 and 1999. Additionally, he was elected to the Clifton ward on North Yorkshire County Council in 1981, and would continue to hold that role until the formation of the unitary City of York Council in 1996.

When Hills was first elected as a councillor, York City Council was run by a Conservative majority administration, though this was reduced to a minority administration within a year. Hills was elected as Labour group leader following the 1984 election, which saw Labour become the largest party on the council, and they formed a minority administration with the support of the SDP–Liberal Alliance, with Hills becoming Leader of the council. Two years later, Labour won a majority of seats on the council, and they would continue to hold a majority on the council and then City of York Council until 2000.

Hills was married twice, with his second marriage being to Carol Wallace, a fellow academic and City of York councillor. On December 18, 2000, Wallace died in an accident at the couple's home, falling down a flight of stairs and suffering fatal head injuries. An inquest the following year made a ruling of accidental death, deeming it to be the likely result of Wallace having consumed an amount of alcohol likely to cause "a significant degree of unco-ordination". In February 2003, Hills would be arrested in connection with Wallace's death, though no criminal charges over the matter would ultimately be pursued against him prior to his own death.

In May 2002, Hills was arrested and formally charged the following month with a number of crimes including blackmail, soliciting, witness intimidation, dangerous driving, perverting the course of justice, and wasting police time. A trial at Newcastle Crown Court over the blackmail charges ultimately collapsed after the prosecution offered no evidence of the alleged crime, with the soliciting and wasting police time charges also being dropped. The only charge that Hills would ultimately be convicted on was dangerous driving.

Following his arrest, the Labour Party's national executive board suspended Hills' membership of the party, and on June 14 the council Labour group voted to remove Hills as group leader, leading to him in turn being removed as Leader of the council. While Hills was subsequently re-admitted to the party, he felt betrayed by his treatment and stood down at the 2003 City of York Council election, at which the party lost control of the council. Just prior to his leaving the council, he was offered to be made an honorary alderman of York, but refused the offer.

== Death ==
A little over two months after Hills' retirement from City of York Council, he fell ill while attempting to visit a friend in the Chapeltown area of Leeds. Finding the person he was attempting to visit not to be at home, Hills instead knocked on the door of a flat next door in an attempt to seek medical assistance. The flat's resident allowed him to use his bed, and Hills passed away not more than four hours later, with the subsequent investigation determining his death to be the result of natural causes. He was survived by his first wife, Liz, and two children from their marriage.

At the time of his death, Hills had been co-habiting with Julie Long, a 27-year-old former prostitute, who credited Hills with saving her from a life of prostitution and drug addiction. Long claimed that Hills had himself fallen victim to drug addiction in his final years, especially after the death of Wallace, though did not comment as to whether drug usage had played a role in his death.

In 2009, fellow Labour councillor and York University academic Roger Pierce began a research project into Hills' career as York council leader, feeling that his legacy had been "airbrushed" from history both by the Labour group and the Liberal Democrat administration that took over the council in 2003.
