= The Woolpack, York =

Listed former pub in York, England

The Woolpack
- The building in 2025
- Interactive map of the The Woolpack area
- Former names: Woolpack Inn

General information
- Status: Converted into a holiday let
- Type: Public house (former); originally a house
- Location: 6 Fawcett Street, York, England
- Coordinates: 53.9536°N 1.0751°W
- Year built: c. 1845
- Renovated: 20th century and 2020s (converted)
- Closed: 2019 (as a pub)

Design and construction
- Designations

Listed Building – Grade II
- Official name: The Woolpack public house
- Designated: 24 June 1983
- Reference no.: 1257862

The Woolpack is a Grade II listed former public house on Fawcett Street in York, England. Built as a house around 1845 and converted into a pub in the 20th century, the site was included within the Central Historic Core conservation area in 1968. The pub closed in 2019 and it has since been adapted as a six‑bedroom holiday let.

== History ==
The building originated as a house dating from around 1845 and was not converted into a public house until the 20th century. A 1930s photograph reproduced in The Press is accompanied by the note that Gladys Darch was the tenant of The Woolpack at the time.

In 1968 the site was included within the newly established Central Historic Core conservation area, and on 24 June 1983, The Woolpack was designated a Grade II listed building. It stands next door but one to the Sea Horse Hotel at No. 4, and the rear of the Edinburgh Arms adjoins the building across a short dead‑end side road; both neighbouring pubs are also Grade II listed.

After closing as a pub, The Woolpack reopened in early 2013 as a music venue and operated for about a year, but the venture proved financially unsustainable and it returned to pub use in October 2014. The pub closed in 2019, and went up for auction in May 2021. Planning permission for conversion to holiday accommodation had been granted in 2019 following an application by Loppas Ltd. It is now operated as a six-bedroom holiday let and is advertised as "The Woolpack York".

== Architecture ==
The pub in 2018, the year before it closed

The front of the building is in red brick, with mottled brick along the side, and it has a hipped roof of slate. It is three storeys with two bays. On the ground floor there is a wide three‑part sash window; the first floor has sash windows, and the top floor has later tilting windows. The doorway on the right has a framed surround with a small cornice, a boarded door, and a rectangular overlight. A timber gutter runs along the front on simple brackets, and there is a chimney near the centre of the roof.

The left side, facing Kent Street, has a bay with windows similar to those at the front, and further left is a lower two‑storey rear wing.

== See also ==
- Listed buildings in York (outside the city walls, southern part)
