= Isabel German =

Anchoress in York, England

- Died: 31 August 1448; All Saint's church, Fishergate, York
- Other names: Lady German
- Occupation: anchoress

Isabel German aka Lady German ( – 31 August 1448) was an English anchoress in York, England. In 2007 her remains were found and these and the written records of the time have enabled her life to be documented.

== Life ==
German came to light when (what are probably) her remains were found by archaeologists in York. She was a hermit who spent 28 years in a room without direct human contact. The remains of her body were found in 2007 in a rare, crouched position, buried in a small space behind the altar of All Saints' Church in Fishergate in York. The only opportunities for women to have a religious life at the time was to be a nun or anchorite. The guidelines for this life were the Ancrene Wisse. Part of its advice is that anchorites might spend their time digging their own grave with their hands. Her remains show that her diseases had led to all the bones of her wrist to fuse together into a single bone. Study of her skeleton which was mostly extant showed that disease had caused extensive damage to her bones. She was found in a foetal position and this may have been due to the disease or that rigor mortis had set in, preventing her from being straightened out.

Archaeologists from On-Site Archaeology had found 667 skeletons in the area, but they attributed skeleton SK3870 to the anchoress, and noted that the apse tomb indicates that she was considered a high-status woman. Investigations concluded that she suffered from the venereal disease syphilis, which can be dormant for decades, in which case it could have been dormant during her 28 years of confinement.

The bones were investigated by University of Sheffield pointed out that the woman could have decided to start her life as an anchoress after having consensual or non-consensual sexual relations. The disease probably ended up affecting her whole body and causing neurological problems. Analysis of the remains also indicated that she had septic arthritis. The data obtained allow us to assume that she was seen as a living prophet in her time.

German died in York and the records from the time are available and she is mentioned in several wills. Rich merchants would leave money to German in the hope of saving their souls. Obviously she would have had no use for the money, but it could explain the churches interests in anchoresses as they made a profit for the church.

Isabel German was featured in an episode of the BBC archaeology series Digging for Britain (Series 10, episode 6, first broadcast in 2023).
