= York Guildhall Annex =

Listed building in York, England

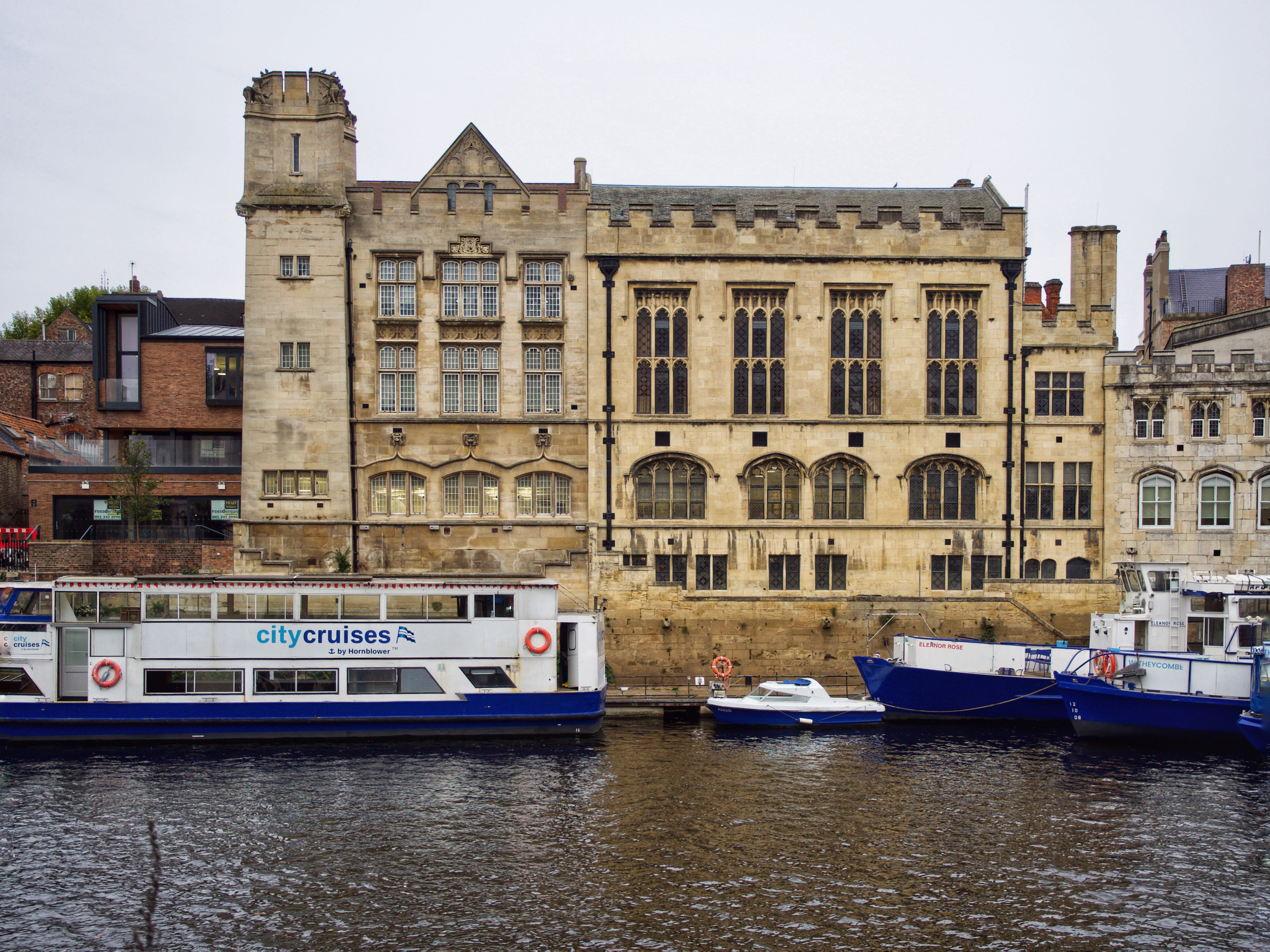
- The buildings in 2025
- Interactive map of the York Guildhall Annex area
- Alternative names: North Annexe

General information
- Status: Converted to civic and commercial use
- Type: Municipal offices and council chamber, later extended for postal use
- Location: Coney Street, York, England
- Coordinates: 53°57′35″N 1°05′09″W
- Years built: 1889–1891 (offices and council chamber); 1901–1903 (annex)
- Renovated: 2019–2022

Design and construction
- Architects: E. G. Mawbey and Alfred Creer (offices and council chamber)
- Designations

Listed Building – Grade II*
- Official name: Municipal offices and Council Chamber and Guildhall Annex
- Designated: 24 June 1983
- Reference no.: 1257939

The York Guildhall Annex (officially listed as Municipal offices and Council Chamber and Guildhall Annex) is a Grade II* listed building off Coney Street in the city of York, England. Built between 1889 and 1891 to provide new municipal offices and a purpose‑designed council chamber for the Corporation, it adjoins the medieval Guildhall and chamber range and was directly linked to them on completion. The complex was enlarged between 1901 and 1903 with a substantial northern extension for the General Post Office. Following the council's relocation to West Offices in 2013, the wider Guildhall complex underwent a major £22 million restoration completed in 2022, and the ranges now form part of the Guildhall York business and events centre, providing office accommodation, meeting rooms, ceremonial space and access to new riverside commercial units.

== History ==
The municipal offices and Council Chamber were built between 1889 and 1891 on the north side of the Guildhall to provide new rooms for council meetings and Corporation staff. The design was by the city surveyors E. G. Mawbey and Alfred Creer, and replaced earlier council rooms on the south side of the Guildhall. The new building was linked directly to the medieval chamber range, with small adjoining rooms cleared to allow internal access.

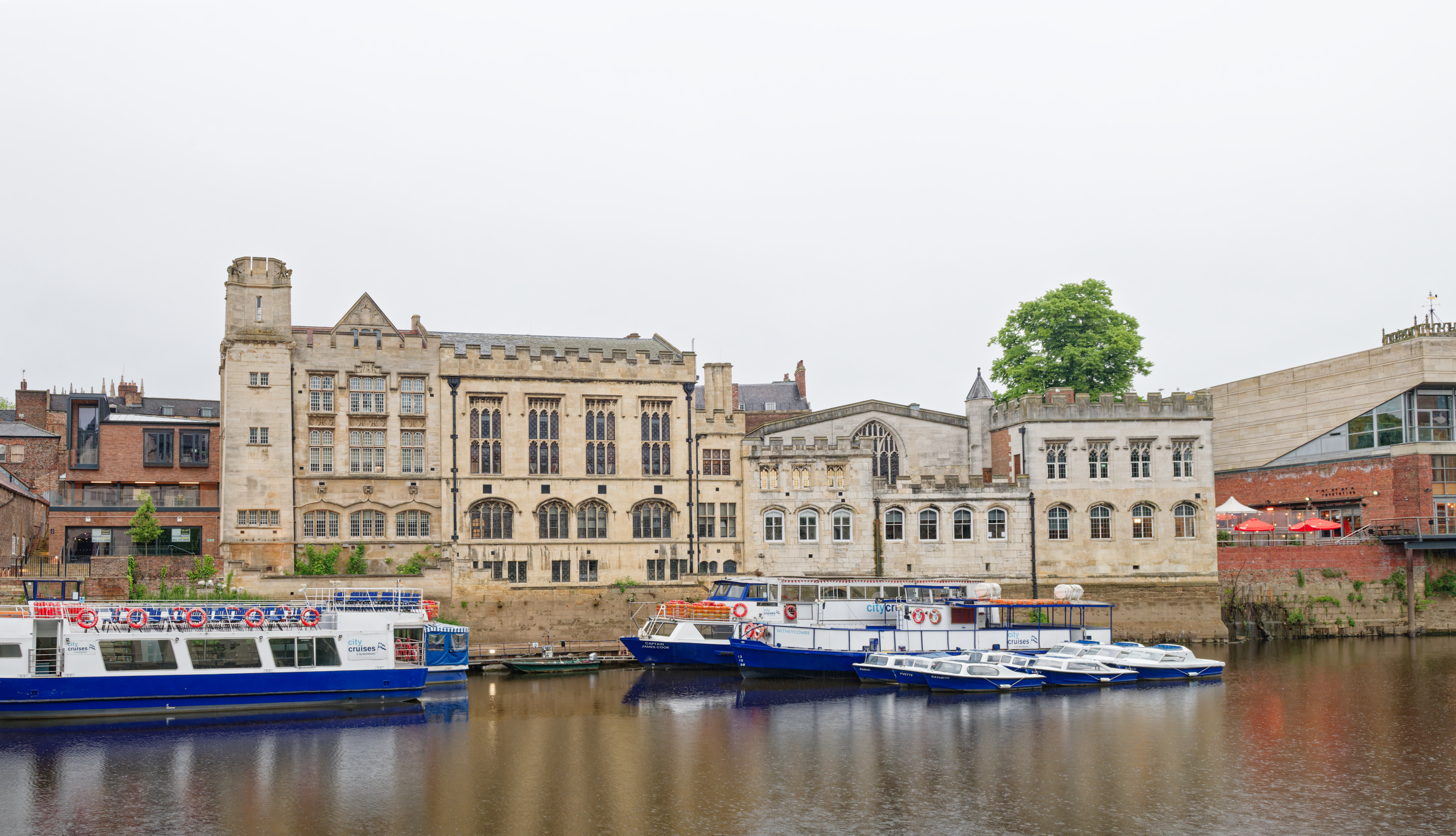
The Guildhall adjoins the complex on the right

The Council Chamber and adjoining spaces were decorated in the early 1890s by Kendal, Milne and Co of Manchester. In the early 20th century, additional rooms on the south side of the Guildhall, including a former muniment room, meeting room and old cells, were also in civic use.

Between 1901 and 1903 the complex was extended at its north end for the General Post Office, which already had premises on Lendal. This early‑20th‑century block, formally known as the Guildhall Annex, is also referred to in archaeological and redevelopment records as the North Annexe, reflecting its position at the northern end of the Guildhall complex. The extension included a large sorting room, storage and service rooms, and accommodation for postal staff. Its river‑front tower and rear range were designed to fit in with the surrounding buildings, likely under the oversight of Sir Henry Tanner of the Office of Works. The upper floor later became a sports hall for post office employees and was converted to office use in the late 20th century.

In 1968 the site was included within the newly established Central Historic Core conservation area, and on 24 June 1983, the municipal offices, Council Chamber, and Guildhall Annex were designated a Grade II* listed building.

The council left the Guildhall complex in 2013 after relocating to West Offices on Station Rise. The wider site then underwent a £22 million restoration completed in 2022, adding workspace, public facilities and riverside commercial units while preserving the listed buildings' historic fabric. Since the redevelopment, the municipal offices, Council Chamber, and Guildhall Annex have formed part of the Guildhall York business and events complex, providing office accommodation, meeting rooms and ceremonial space, with new riverside units beside the annex later approved for conversion into a bar and restaurant with an on‑site brewery.

== Architecture ==
The municipal offices and Council Chamber are built in limestone on the river front and cream brick to the east, with slate roofs and tall stone chimney stacks. The plan is arranged along a north–south range attached to the Guildhall, with offices on the lower floors and the double‑height Council Chamber facing the river. A series of link bays connect the building to the Guildhall, and a towered block marks the north end where it meets the later Guildhall Annex.

The river front forms the main elevation, with three storeys over a basement and tall windows lighting the Council Chamber. The ground floor has arched openings, while the upper windows rise through two levels and contain coloured glazing. A small link block joins the medieval chamber range, with a terrace at basement level leading down to the Watergate arch beneath the Guildhall.

To the east, the building is plainer, with brick walls, sash windows and a prominent stair window set within the projecting staircase block. The adjoining range continues northwards to the Guildhall Annex.

The early‑20th‑century annex repeats the limestone river front and adds a taller corner tower. Its front has grouped mullioned windows and decorative stonework, including carved panels and a cartouche with the Post Office emblem. The tower rises in stages with buttresses, gargoyles and a pierced parapet. The north side continues the stone treatment, while the rear is in red brick with simple openings and service doors.

=== Interior ===
Inside, the building is arranged around an entrance hall, main staircase and long corridors, all with patterned mosaic floors that include York emblems. The entrance hall has a coffered ceiling and opens to the Guildhall through a group of arched doorways with leaded windows above. The main staircase rises through an open well with stone and marble detailing, coloured glass in the stair windows, and a stained‑glass panel gifted to the city in the 20th century. Painted decoration of civic symbols continues around the landings, which lead to the Council Chamber and adjoining rooms.

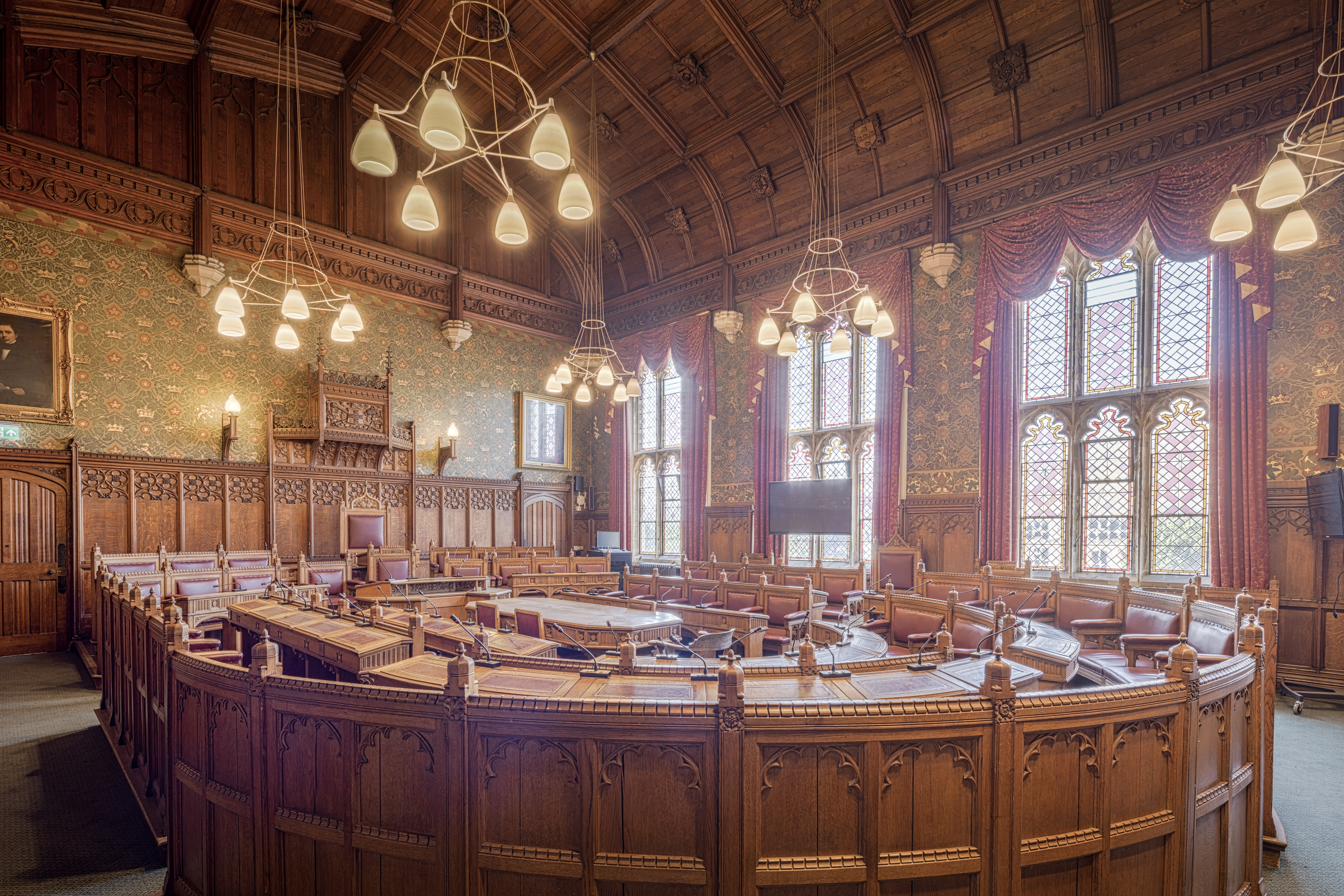
The Council Chamber in 2026

The Council Chamber is a large timber‑vaulted room with rich decorative work by Kendal, Milne and Co. Its roof is divided into deep coffers with carved bosses, and the walls are lined with traceried panelling and painted heraldic motifs. The south end contains the Lord Mayor's dais beneath an ornate canopy, flanked by arched doorways to the lobby and anteroom. A prominent chimneypiece on the east wall combines carved timber, painted tiles and a marble fireplace with civic emblems. Original benches, desks and public seating survive, arranged around a central table. The anteroom retains fitted timber work and a marble fireplace.

Offices along the corridors have tall arched doorways, glazed upper panels and coffered ceilings, with marble fireplaces in many rooms. A small flat occupies the upper east side, retaining simple timber fireplaces.

The basement runs the length of the building, with tiled walls, terrazzo floors and concrete ceilings supported on steel beams. Original doors survive throughout, and the space is reached from both staircases.

Behind the riverside block of the Guildhall Annex is a long brick range that once served as the sorting office. It is a plain, functional structure that has been altered internally. A small early‑20th‑century WC outshot and a boundary wall with a store stand beside it; these later additions are not included in the listing.

== See also ==
- Grade II* listed buildings in the City of York
- Listed buildings in York (within the city walls, northern part)
