= Edinburgh Arms =

Listed pub in York, England

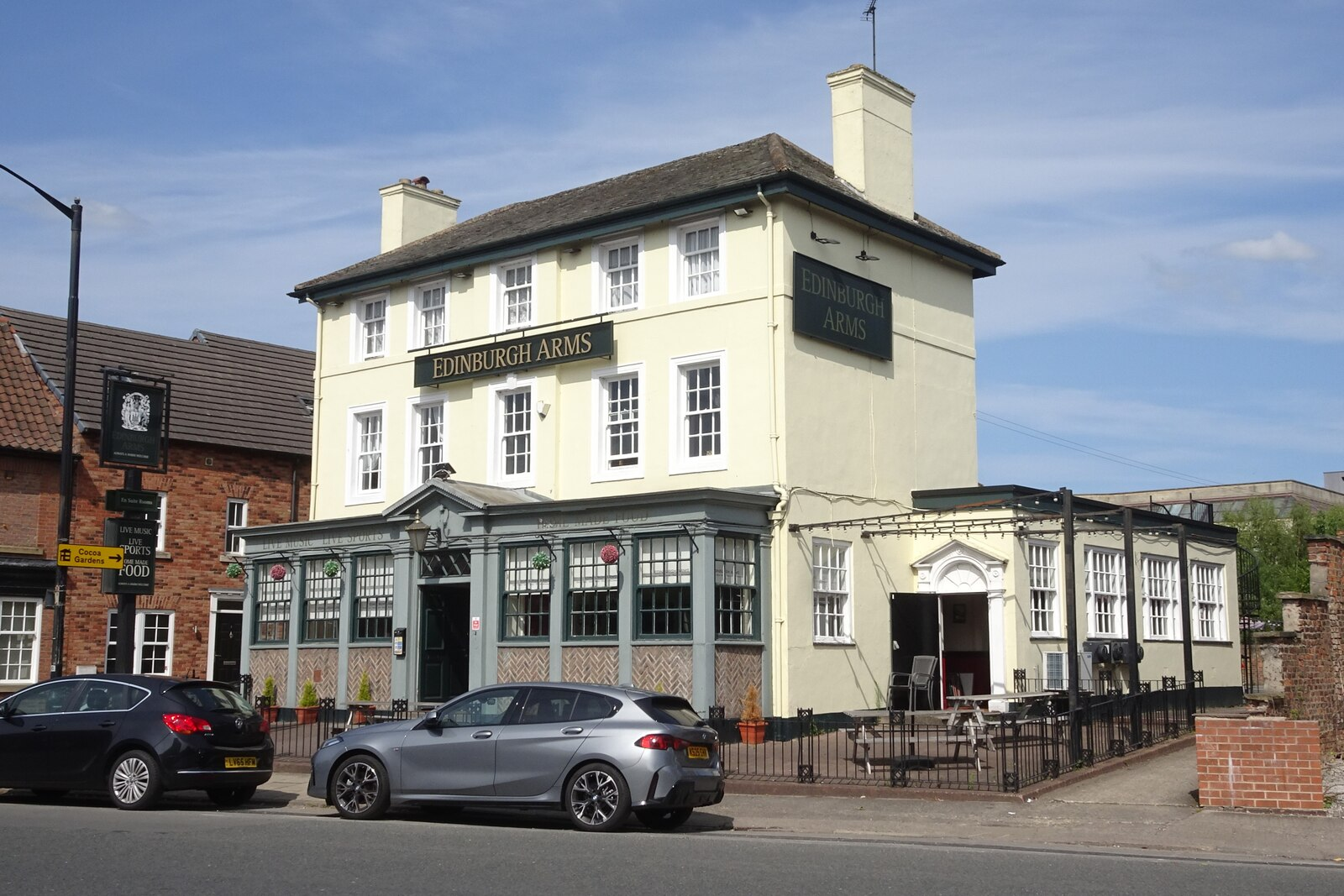
- The pub in 2025
- Interactive map of the Edinburgh Arms area

General information
- Type: Public house
- Location: 25 Fishergate, York, England
- Coordinates: 53.9530°N 1.0760°W
- Year built: c. 1830

Listed Building – Grade II
- Official name: The Edinburgh Arms
- Designated: 14 March 1997
- Reference no.: 1257839

The Edinburgh Arms is a historic public house on Fishergate in York, England.

The building was constructed in about 1830, when Fishergate, the street leading south out of the city centre, was built up. In 1937, it was converted into the Edinburgh Arms pub. In the 1960s, its rooms were often used as accommodation by musicians playing at the Rialto across the road, including The Beatles, the Rolling Stones and Roy Orbison. More recently, it has hosted gigs and serves food. In 2023, after the York Barbican was evacuated, most of the players from the UK Snooker Championship spent the evening in the pub. The pub is also said to be home to two ghosts. The building was Grade II listed in 1997. The rear of the Edinburgh Arms faces Fawcett Street, and across a short dead‑end side road is the Grade II-listed former Woolpack pub.

The building is constructed of stuccoed brick, with a timber ground-floor front infilled with herringbone brick, and slate roofs. It has three storeys and a five-bay front, with the centre bay projecting slightly forward. To the right is a single-storey extension. The front centre has double doors with a pediment above. The windows are sashes, and there are bands at first and second-floor level.

== See also ==
- Listed buildings in York (outside the city walls, southern part)
