= Sea Horse Hotel =

Listed pub in York, England

- The pub in 2025
- Interactive map of the Sea Horse Hotel area
- Former names: The Shire Horses

General information
- Type: Public house
- Location: 4 Fawcett Street, York, England
- Coordinates: 53.9533°N 1.0756°W
- Year built: Mid-19th century
- Owner: Samuel Smith's

Design and construction
- Designations

Listed Building – Grade II
- Official name: Sea Horse Hotel
- Designated: 24 June 1983
- Reference no.: 1257861

Website
- Official website

The Sea Horse Hotel is a Grade II listed public house and bed and breakfast on Fawcett Street in York, England. The building dates from the mid‑19th century, and the site was included within the newly established Central Historic Core conservation area in 1968. As of January 2026, the freehold is owned by Samuel Smith's.

== History ==
The public house was built on Fawcett Street in the mid‑19th century, according to its official listing. In 1968 the site was included within the newly established Central Historic Core conservation area. It was designated a Grade II listed building on 24 June 1983, when it was entered under the name The Shire Horses. It stands next door but one to the former Woolpack pub at No. 6, also Grade II listed. The Sea Horse Hotel also contains guest accommodation, which is run as a bed and breakfast. As of January 2026, the freehold is owned by Samuel Smith's.

== Architecture ==
The pub sign in 2023

The building is of brick with a hipped roof of slate. It has three storeys and five bays, with a visible straight joint to the right of the third window. The windows are glazing‑bar sashes set beneath brick lintels. On the ground floor of the second bay there is a carriage entrance, framed by a wide timber lintel on pilasters, with angled sides leading into the narrower central opening. To the right is a sash window with two panes over four, and to the left a four‑panel door. The two bays at the right end of the front elevation contain a pair of four‑over‑four sash windows to the right, and a timber doorcase to the left with pilasters, a bracketed cornice, and panelled reveals; the door itself has four panels. There are chimneys at the left end and another in front of the ridge between the third and fourth bays.

=== Interior ===
The front of the building contains a wood‑panelled public bar and an adjoining parlour used by families. To the rear are a larger bar and a dining room. Each space has its own character and includes historic photographs.

== See also ==
- Listed buildings in York (outside the city walls, southern part)
