= City of York Council =

Council for the city of York, England

- Coat of arms of York (with cap of maintenance)

Type
- Type: Unitary authority

Leadership
- Lord Mayor: Margaret Wells, Labour since 21 May 2026
- Leader: Claire Douglas, Labour since 25 May 2023
- Chief Executive: Richard Webb since April 2026

Structure
- Seats: 47 councillors
- Graph of the party split among 47 seats.
- Political groups: Administration (24) Labour (24) Other parties (23) Liberal Democrats (19) Conservative (3) Restore (1)
- Length of term: Whole council elected every four years

Elections
- Voting system: Plurality-at-large voting
- Last election: 4 May 2023
- Next election: 6 May 2027

Meeting place
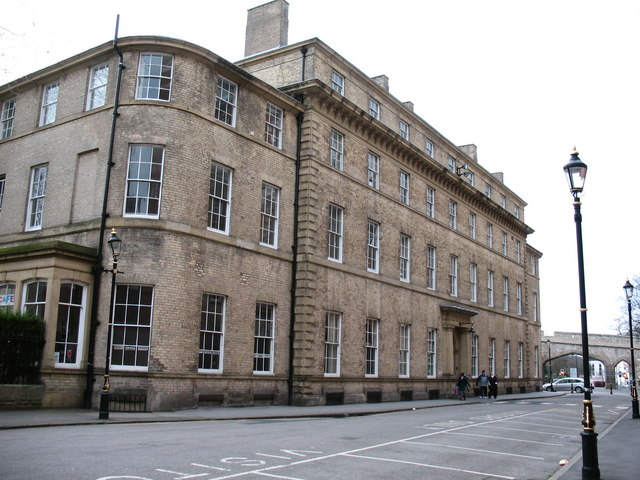
- West Offices, Station Rise, York, YO1 6GA

Website
- www.york.gov.uk

City of York Council is the local authority for the city of York, in the ceremonial county of North Yorkshire, England. York has had a city council from medieval times, which has been reformed on numerous occasions. Since 1996 the council has been a unitary authority, being a district council which also performs the functions of a county council. Since 2024 the council has been a member of the York and North Yorkshire Combined Authority.

The council has been under Labour majority control since 2023. It is based at West Offices on Station Rise.

== History ==
York was an ancient borough, which held city status from time immemorial. In 1396 the city was given the right to appoint its own sheriffs, making it a county corporate, outside the jurisdiction of the Sheriff of Yorkshire. In 1449 an adjoining rural area called the Ainsty, covering several villages to the south-west of York, was brought under the city's authority.

By the nineteenth century the city corporation's powers were deemed inadequate to deal with the challenges of providing and maintaining the infrastructure of the city. A separate body of improvement commissioners was established in 1825 to pave, light and repair the streets, provide a watch, and supply water.

York was reformed in 1836 to become a municipal borough under the Municipal Corporations Act 1835, which standardised how many boroughs operated across the country. The city was then governed by a body formally called the "lord mayor, aldermen and citizens of the city of York", generally known as the corporation or city council. Shortly afterwards the question arose as to whether the reformed corporation's area still included the Ainsty. This was resolved later in 1836 when the Municipal Corporation (Boundaries) Act 1836 confirmed that the municipal boundaries only covered the city proper, and the Ainsty was transferred to the West Riding.

The improvement commissioners continued to exist alongside the reformed corporation until 1850, when the city was also made a local board district with the city council acting as the local board, thereby taking over the responsibilities of the abolished commissioners.

The city's municipal boundaries were enlarged on a number of occasions, notably in 1884 when it gained areas including Clifton and Heworth, and in 1937 when it gained areas including Acomb, Dringhouses and Middlethorpe. There were more modest adjustments to the boundaries in 1934, 1957 and 1968.

When elected county councils were established in 1889 under the Local Government Act 1888, York was considered large enough to provide its own county-level services and so it was made a county borough, independent from the three county councils established for the surrounding East Riding, North Riding and West Riding. For lieutenancy purposes York was deemed part of the West Riding.

York was reconstituted as a non-metropolitan district in 1974 under the Local Government Act 1972. As part of those reforms, the city was placed in the new non-metropolitan county of North Yorkshire, with the city council ceding county-level functions to the new North Yorkshire County Council. The city retained the same boundaries at the time of the 1974 reforms.

In 1996, following a review under the Local Government Act 1992, the district was replaced by a unitary authority with significantly larger boundaries, gaining a number of civil parishes from the neighbouring districts of Harrogate, Ryedale and Selby. Some of these parishes were already effectively suburbs, having been absorbed into the city's urban area since the boundaries had last been reviewed in 1968; others formed part of the rural hinterland around the city. The reforms included the creation of a new non-metropolitan county of York covering the same area as the enlarged district, but with no separate county council; instead the district (city) council took on county functions, making it a unitary authority. The city remains part of the wider ceremonial county of North Yorkshire for the purposes of lieutenancy.

Local government across North Yorkshire was reviewed again in 2023, when North Yorkshire County Council also became a unitary authority, and rebranded itself as North Yorkshire Council. As part of the process leading up to those reforms various alternatives were considered, some of which would have divided North Yorkshire into smaller unitary authorities which could have included York, but these alternatives were ultimately rejected.

Instead, a combined authority was established in 2024 covering York and North Yorkshire, called the York and North Yorkshire Combined Authority. It is chaired by the directly elected Mayor of York and North Yorkshire.

== Governance ==
City of York Council provides both county-level and district-level services. Parts of the city are included in civil parishes, which form a second tier of local government for their areas. The central part of the modern city, corresponding to the former city boundaries as existed between 1968 and 1996, is an unparished area.

=== Political control ===
Following the 2023 election the Labour Party emerged with a majority. The leader is Claire Douglas, the first female council leader in the city's history.

Political control of the council since the 1974 reforms has been as follows:

Non-metropolitan district

Party in control	Years
No overall control	1974–1976
Conservative	1976–1980
No overall control	1980–1986
Labour	1986–1996

Unitary authority

Party in control	Years
Labour	1996–2000
No overall control	2000–2003
Liberal Democrats	2003–2007
No overall control	2007–2011
Labour	2011–2015
No overall control	2015–2023
Labour	2023–present

=== Leadership ===
The role of Lord Mayor of York is largely ceremonial, and tends to be held by a different person each year. Political leadership is provided instead by the leader of the council. The leaders since 1984 have been:

Councillor	Party	From	To
Rod Hills	Labour	1984	May 2002
Dave Merrett	Labour	15 Jul 2002	May 2003
Steve Galloway	Liberal Democrats	May 2003	22 May 2008
Andrew Waller	Liberal Democrats	22 May 2008	May 2011
James Alexander	Labour	26 May 2011	11 Dec 2014
Dafydd Williams	Labour	11 Dec 2014	May 2015
Chris Steward	Conservative	21 May 2015	May 2016
David Carr	Conservative	26 May 2016	22 Feb 2018
Ian Gillies	Conservative	8 Mar 2018	May 2019
Keith Aspden	Liberal Democrats	22 May 2019	May 2023
Claire Douglas	Labour	25 May 2023	

=== Composition ===
Following the 2023 election, and subsequent by-elections and changes of allegiance up to September 2026, the composition of the council was:

Party	Seats
Labour	24
Liberal Democrats	19
Conservative	3
Restore	1
Total	47

The next election is due in 2027.

== Elections ==
Since the last boundary changes in 2015 the council has comprised 47 councillors representing 21 wards, with each ward electing one, two or three councillors. Elections are held every four years.

== Premises ==
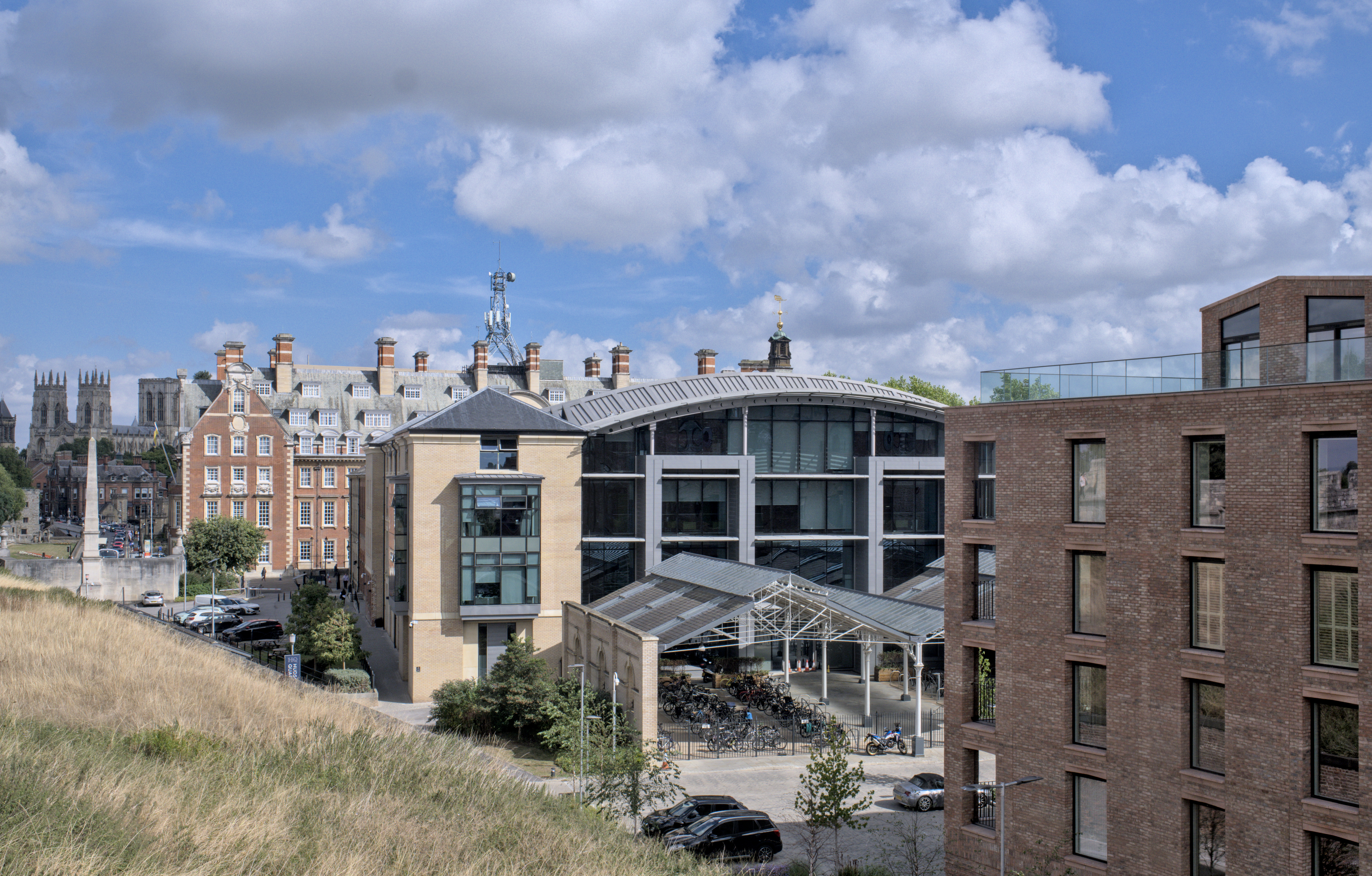
Back of West Offices, showing the 2013 extension

The council is based at West Offices on Station Rise, which is the converted and extended original York railway station of 1841. The council moved into the newly-extended building in 2013.

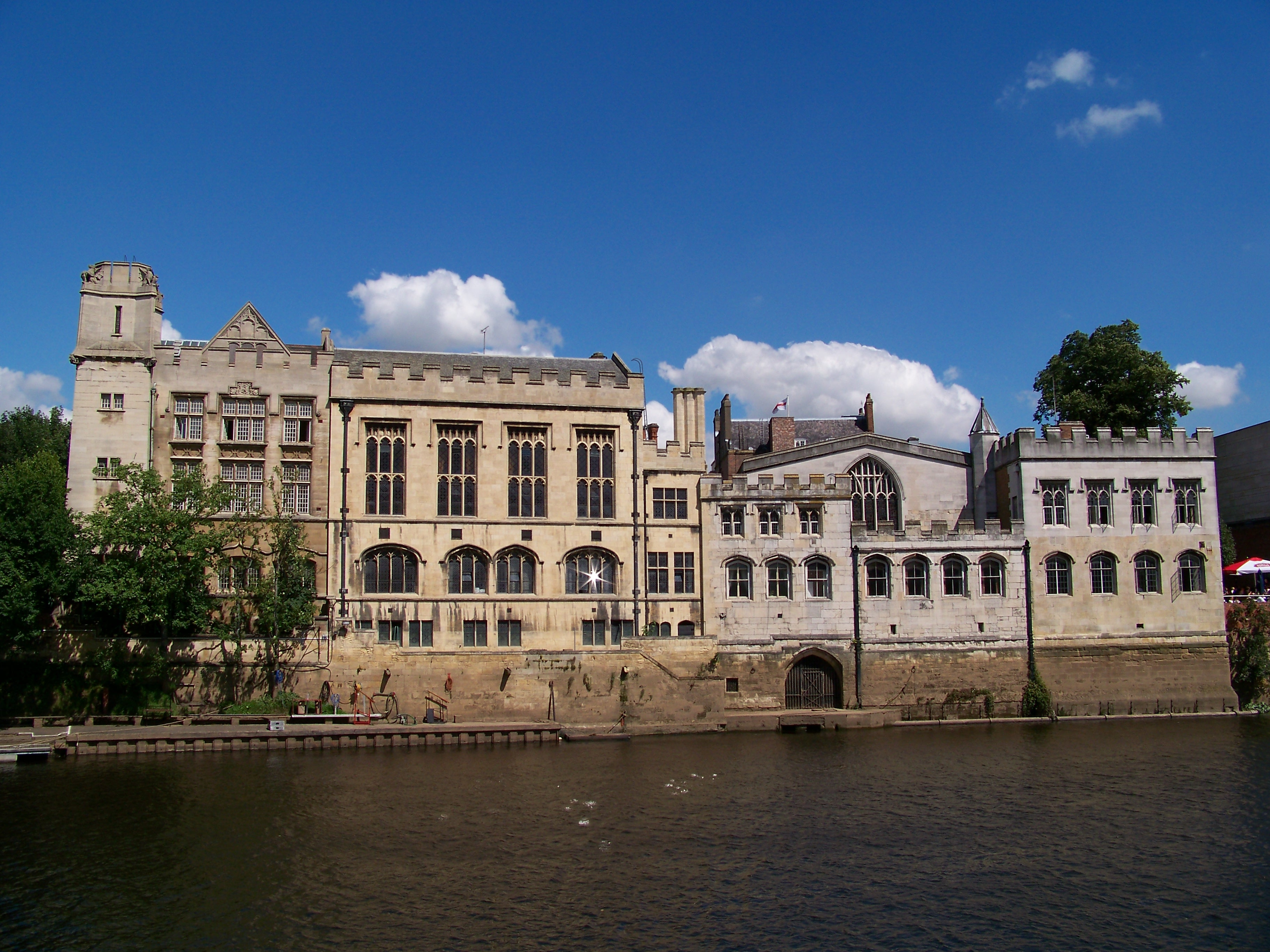
Guildhall (right) and its Annex (left), formerly the council's headquarters; the Council Chamber is still used for some full meetings

Prior to 2013 the council was based at York Guildhall on the banks of the River Ouse, the oldest parts of which date back to the 15th century. Full council meetings are still occasionally held in the Council Chamber at the Grade II*-listed Guildhall Annex, which is now occupied by the University of York.

== Social care ==
In October 2020 the council provided older people in the city with smart watches, which monitor a range of indicators including body temperature, heart rate, sleep patterns and step count. They are supported by sensors in their homes that can capture temperature and humidity, movement, how often doors open and close and power consumption. The service is provided by Sensing247 and North SP Group Limited and is intended to help people stay independent.
