= York railway station (1841) =

Former railway station in York, England

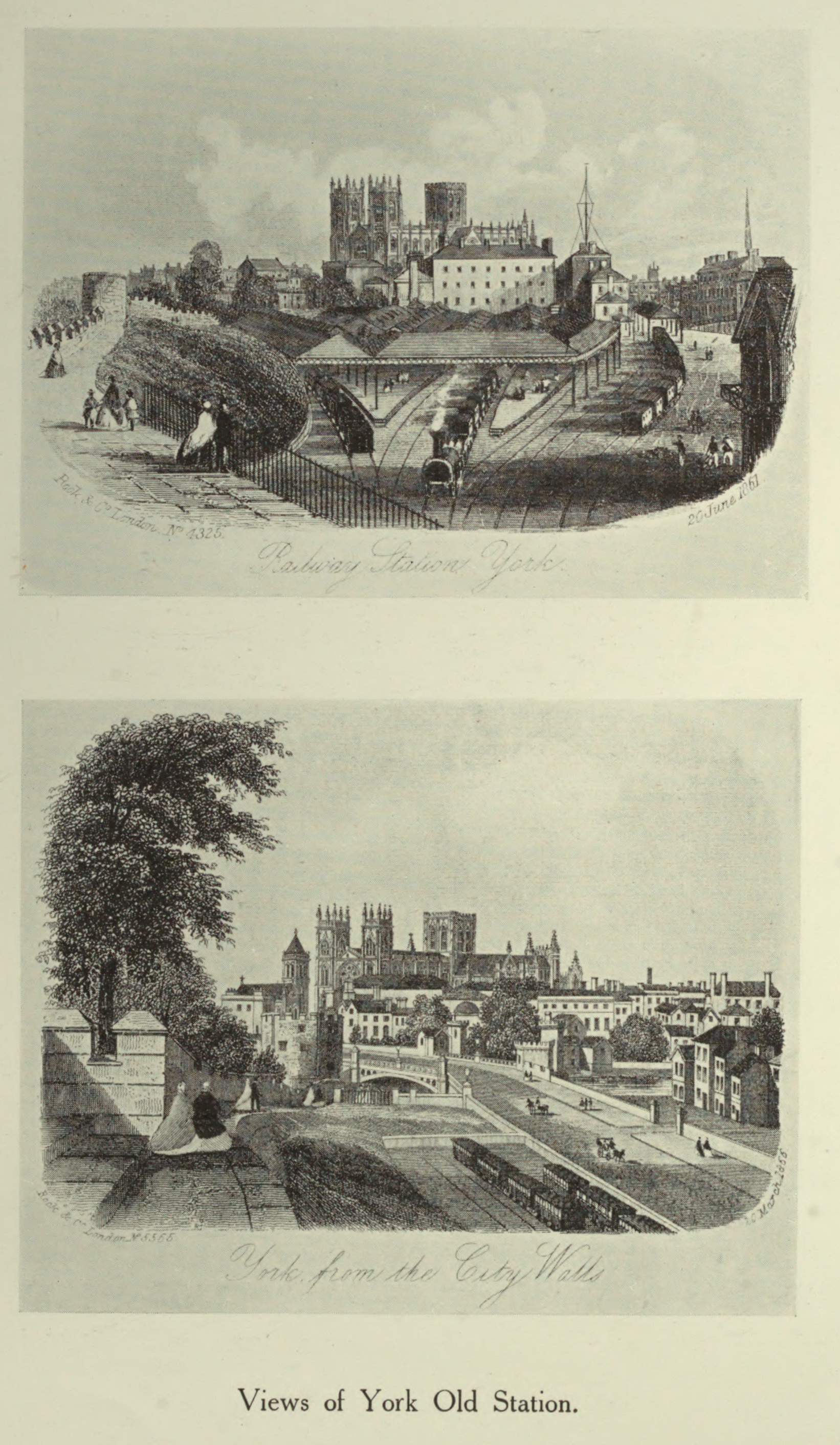
- York "old" railway station, which was the first permanent railway station in the city, was built by the York and North Midland Railway
- Interactive map of the York railway station (1841) area

General information
- Location: Toft Green, York, England
- Coordinates: 53.9583°N 1.0894°W
- Years built: 1840–41 (station); 1852–53 (hotel)
- Renovated: 1845 and 1850s (station altered and extended)
- Closed: 1877

Technical details
- Material: Sandstone ashlar, brick, slate

Design and construction
- Architect: George Townsend Andrews
- Engineer: T. Cabray

Listed Building – Grade II*
- Official name: Old station and former Station Hotel
- Designated: 20 December 1974
- Reference no.: 1256403

York "old" railway station served the city of York, England, between 1841 and 1877. The station, which was the line's terminus within York city walls, was superseded by York railway station. The old station is a Grade II* listed building.

== Origin ==
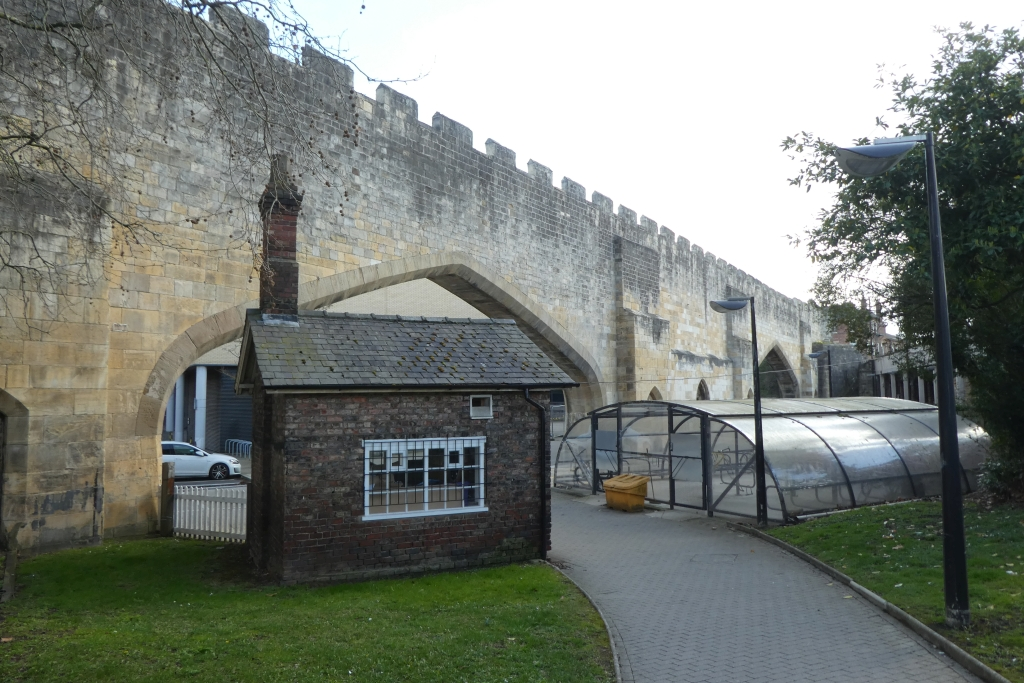
Trains entered the station through these arches in York's city walls

In 1839, the York and North Midland Railway opened the first railway station in York. A temporary building just outside the city walls on Queen Street. It acted as the terminus of the original mainline route for trains to London, via Derby and Birmingham.

Within two years, the Y&NMR had completed York old station inside the city walls at the junction of Toft Green, Tanner Row and Station Rise. The building was the work of architect George Townsend Andrews, who also designed the neo-Tudor arches in the city walls which allowed trains to access the station. When it opened on 4 January 1841, the temporary station was closed.

== Building ==
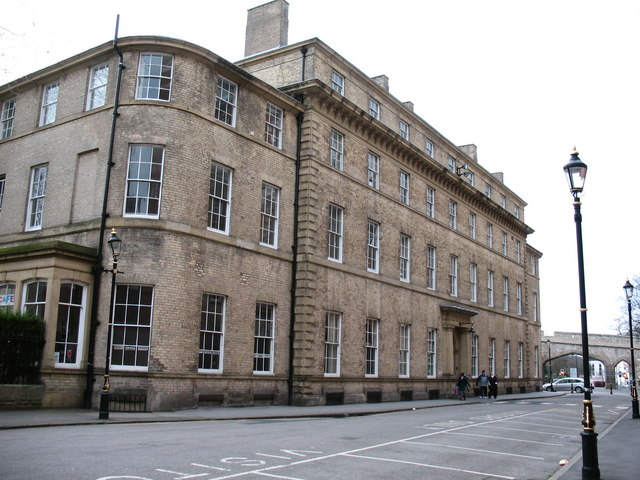
The hotel frontage of York old station

Andrews built the station in an Italianate style. The main façade, which faces Tanner Row and Toft Green, has a symmetrical seventeen-bay three-storey block. The ground floor is constructed from limestone while the upper floors are brick with stone dressings.

Behind the station facade was the train-shed containing the platforms which had a canopy constructed in iron. It was demolished in 1965. By the city walls, were brick buildings which housed the refreshment rooms and waiting rooms. They originally were only one storey but second floor was added in 1850.

Andrews also designed the hotel on Station Rise. After it was completed in 1853, it became the first purpose-built hotel to be incorporated into a railway station. It was named "The Royal Station Hotel" in 1854 following a visit by Queen Victoria.

== Closure ==
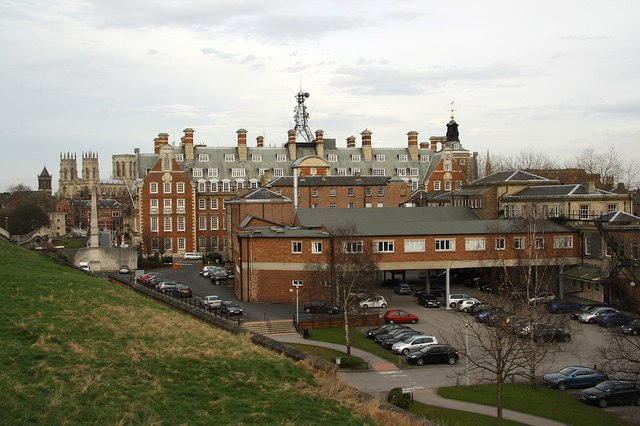
A rear view of the old railway station seen from York city wall, prior to the renovation work to convert the building in 2011. The remains of the train-shed can be seen as well as the backs of the station buildings. The large Queen Anne-style building beyond the station is the former HQ of the North Eastern Railway

With the rapid increase in the number of new railway lines during the period known as railway mania, this station suffered from being the terminus for all trains from London. When plans were proposed for York to become part of the route from London to Newcastle and beyond. Any through-trains calling at York would have to reverse out of the station to continue their journeys.

In 1877 the current York railway station opened on a site just outside the city walls for all through-trains. Although passenger services into York Old Station ceased, the lines were used as sidings until 1965. The railway building and hotel were converted into offices. Following the Beeching Axe the lines were lifted, and the station site cleared.

== Preservation ==
In February 2010, the City of York Council announced that it intended to convert the former station hotel into its new 150,000 sq ft (14,000 m^{2}) headquarters, to be known as the West Offices. A planning application was submitted, and was approved in June 2010. English Heritage and York Civic Trust supported the proposal. Following objections by The Victorian Society to some aspects of the conversion, the application had to await a decision of the Secretary of State, but it was eventually approved and work on refurbishing the building was completed in April 2013. A 'Topping Out' ceremony was conducted by construction and project teams from York Investors LLP, Miller Construction and City of York Council on 17 November 2011. The council moved in during the spring of 2013. An official opening ceremony was conducted on 20 September 2013.

== See also ==
- Grade II* listed buildings in the City of York
- Listed buildings in York (within the city walls, southern part)
