= York Guildhall =

Grade I listed building in York, England

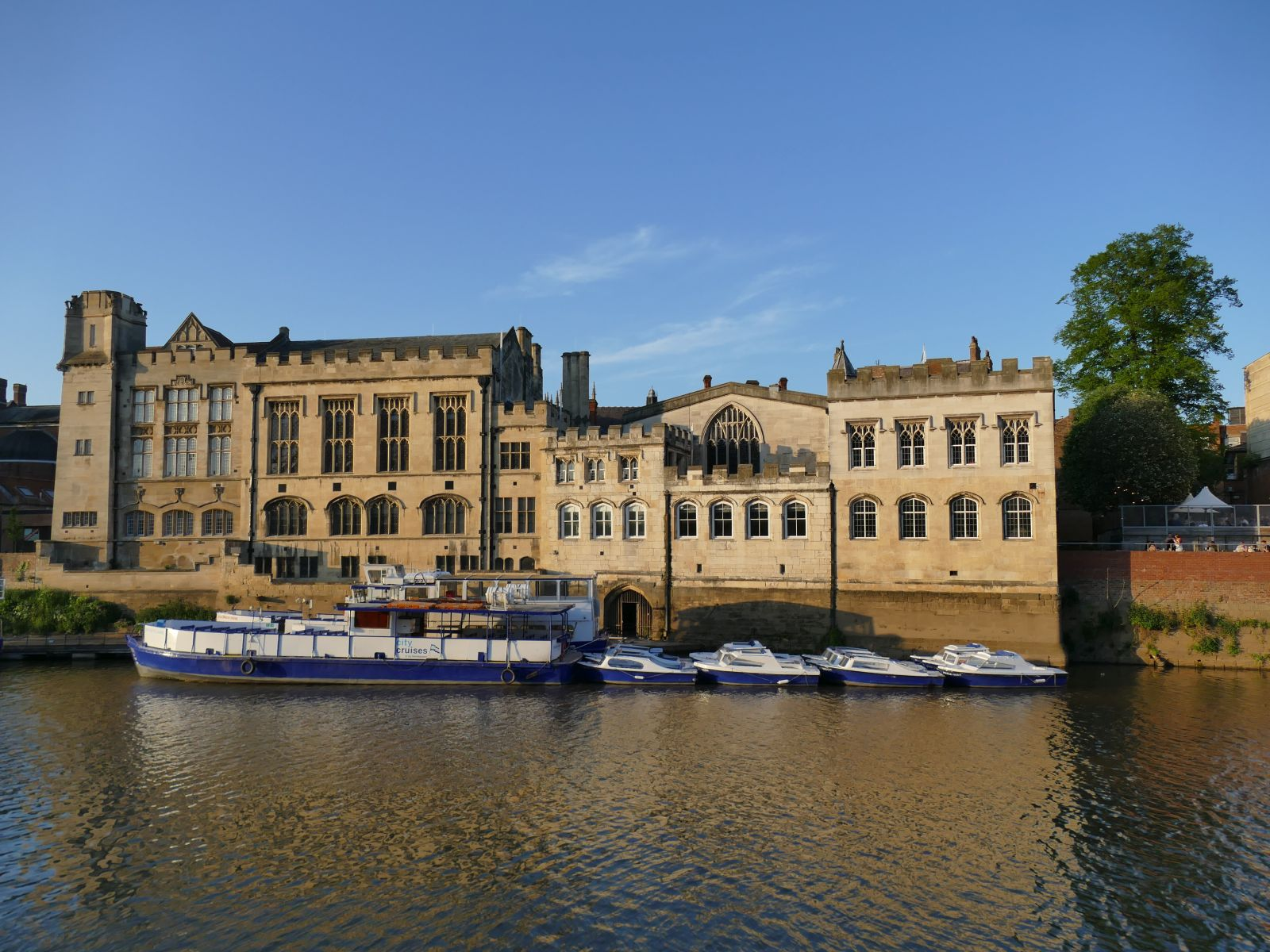
- The Guildhall facing the River Ouse

- Location within York City Centre

General information
- Location: St Martins Courtyard, Coney Street, York, North Yorkshire, England
- Coordinates: 53.9596°N 1.0856°W
- Year built: 1449–1459
- Renovated: 1958–1960 (restored)

Listed Building – Grade I
- Official name: Guildhall and chamber range, Atkinson block, Common Hall Lane and boundary wall containing entrance to lane
- Designated: 14 June 1954
- Reference no.: 1257929

The York Guildhall is a municipal building in St Martins Courtyard on Coney Street in York, England. Located behind the Mansion House, it is a Grade I listed building.

== History ==
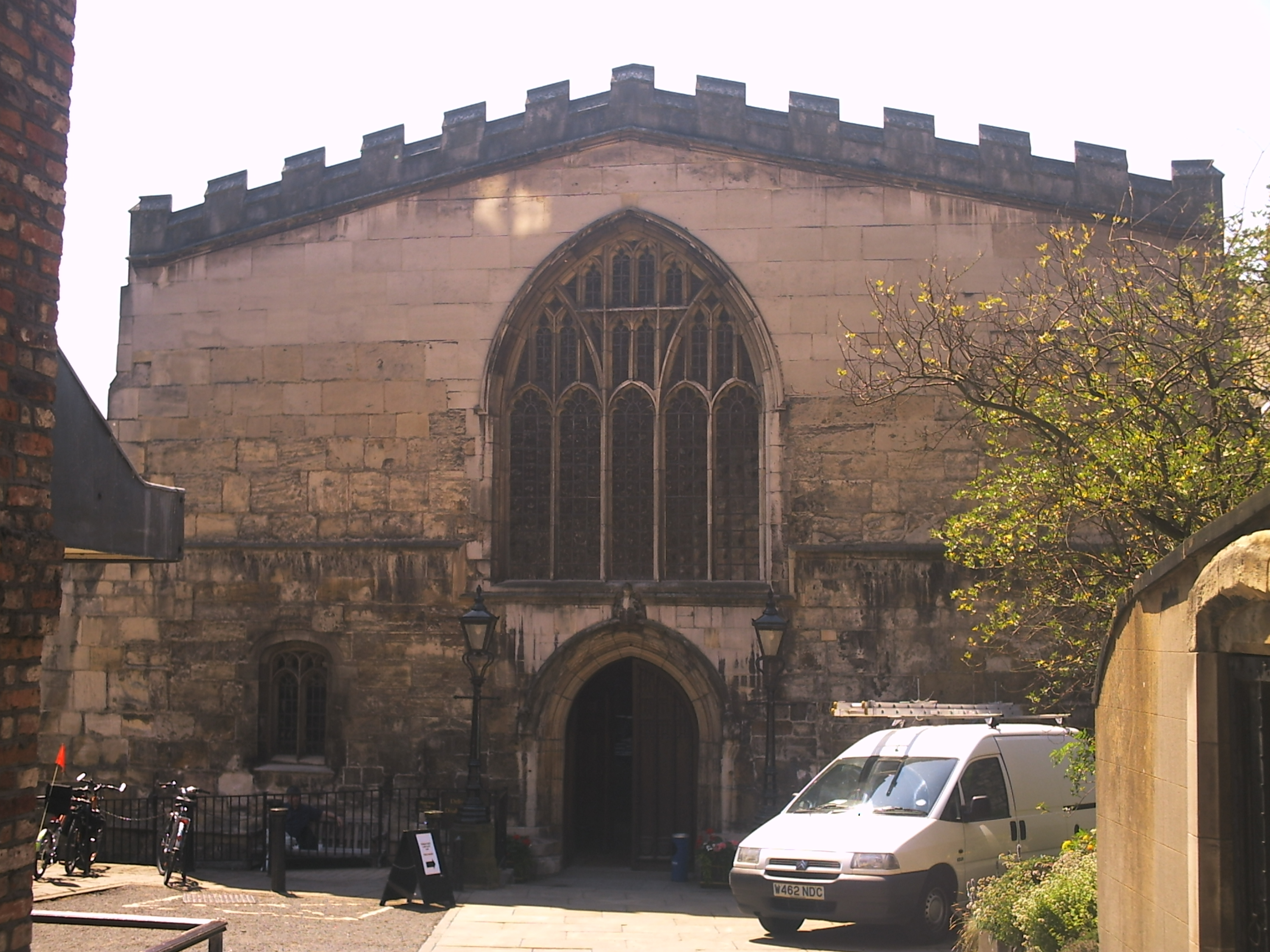
York Guildhall as seen from the rear of the Mansion House

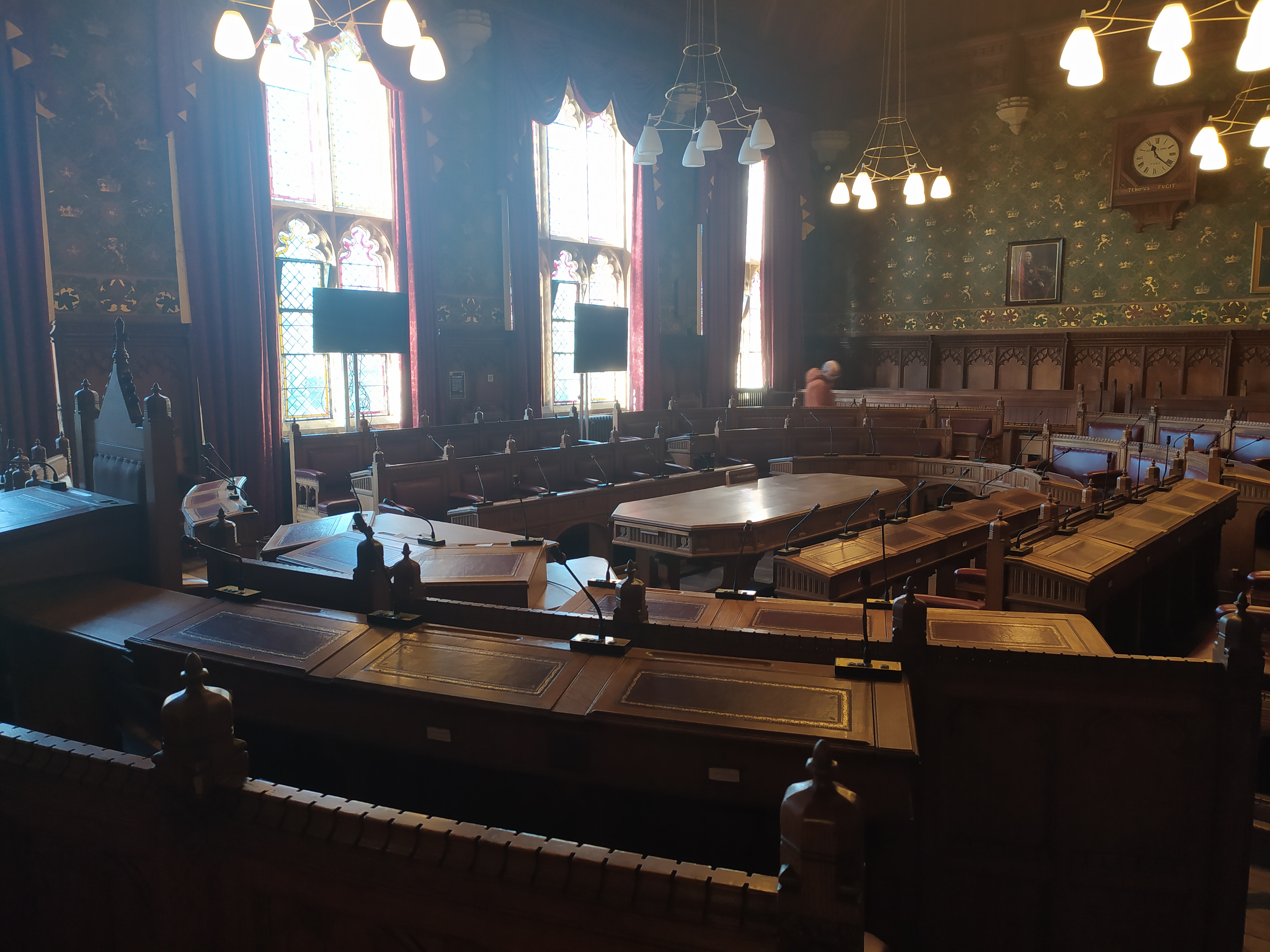
Council Chamber in the Guildhall Annex

The building was constructed as a meeting place for the City's guilds between 1449 and 1459.

King Richard III was entertained in the building in 1483, and the Guildhall was the venue for the trial of St Margaret Clitherow, a Catholic martyr, in 1586. It was also the place where a ransom of £200,000 was counted before being given to the Scots in payment for the release of Charles I in 1647 during the English Civil War, and where Prince Albert, the Prince Consort to Queen Victoria was a guest of honour at a royal banquet in the building in October 1850. At the north end of the Guildhall was a stained glass window painted by Henry Gyles in about 1682.

In 1811 a building, designed by Peter Atkinson the younger as a council chamber, was erected to the south of the original hall (this is now known as "the Atkinson Room"). Then in 1891, another building, designed by Enoch Mawbey, the city surveyor, accommodating a larger council chamber, was built to the north of the original hall (this building is now known as "the Municipal Offices"). The new council chamber was decorated by Kendal, Milne and Co in the 1890s. These late‑19th‑century civic ranges, forming the group now known as the York Guildhall Annex, occupy the north side of the Guildhall complex and include both the offices and the extension built between 1901 and 1903 for the General Post Office.

The interior of the original building, including the stained glass window, was destroyed during a Baedeker raid in 1942. After the war the Guildhall was rebuilt and a new stained glass window, depicting five aspects of the city's history (architecture, war, civic affairs, commercial trade and religious education), was designed and installed by Harry Harvey of York. The complex was re-opened by Queen Elizabeth The Queen Mother in 1960.

Throughout the 20th century, meetings of the City of York Council were held in the Guildhall; however, in Autumn 2017, when a programme of restoration work began at the Guildhall, temporary arrangements were put in place for the council to meet in The Citadel on Gillygate. The renovation, which cost £21 million and was carried out to remedy serious structural issues, was completed in 2022 and the building was subsequently leased to the University of York, as a centre for start up businesses.

== Gallery ==
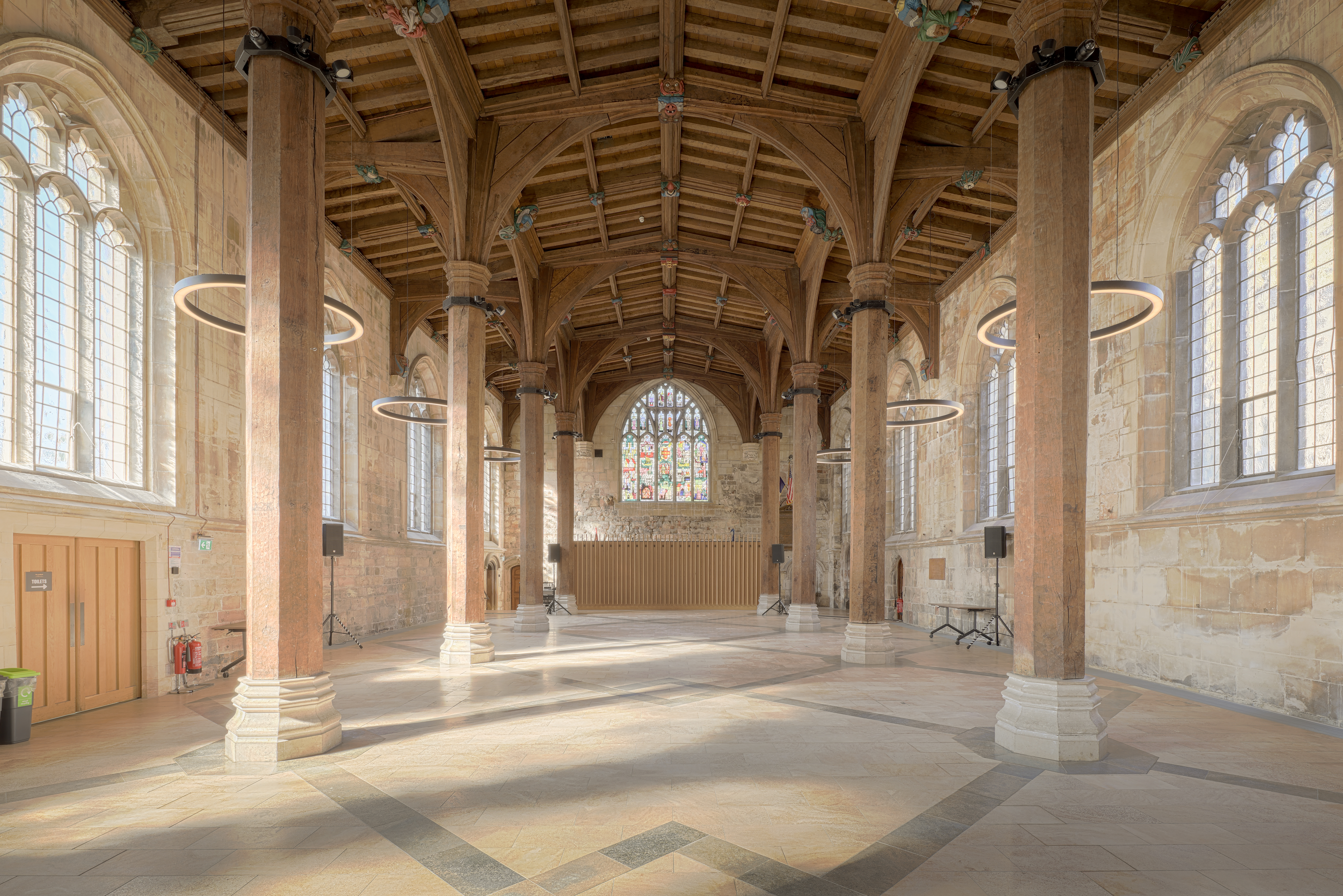
The Main Hall

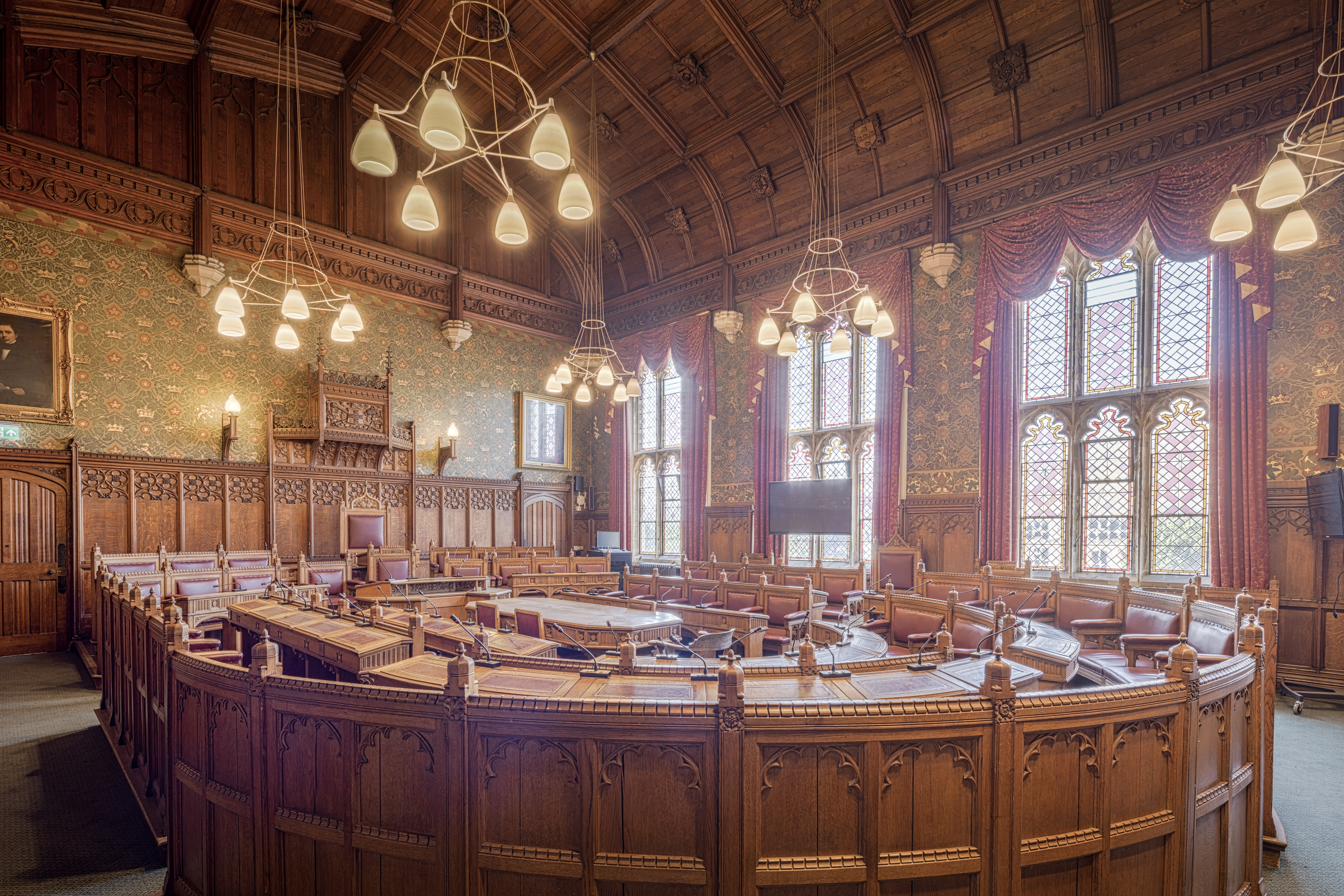
The Council Chamber

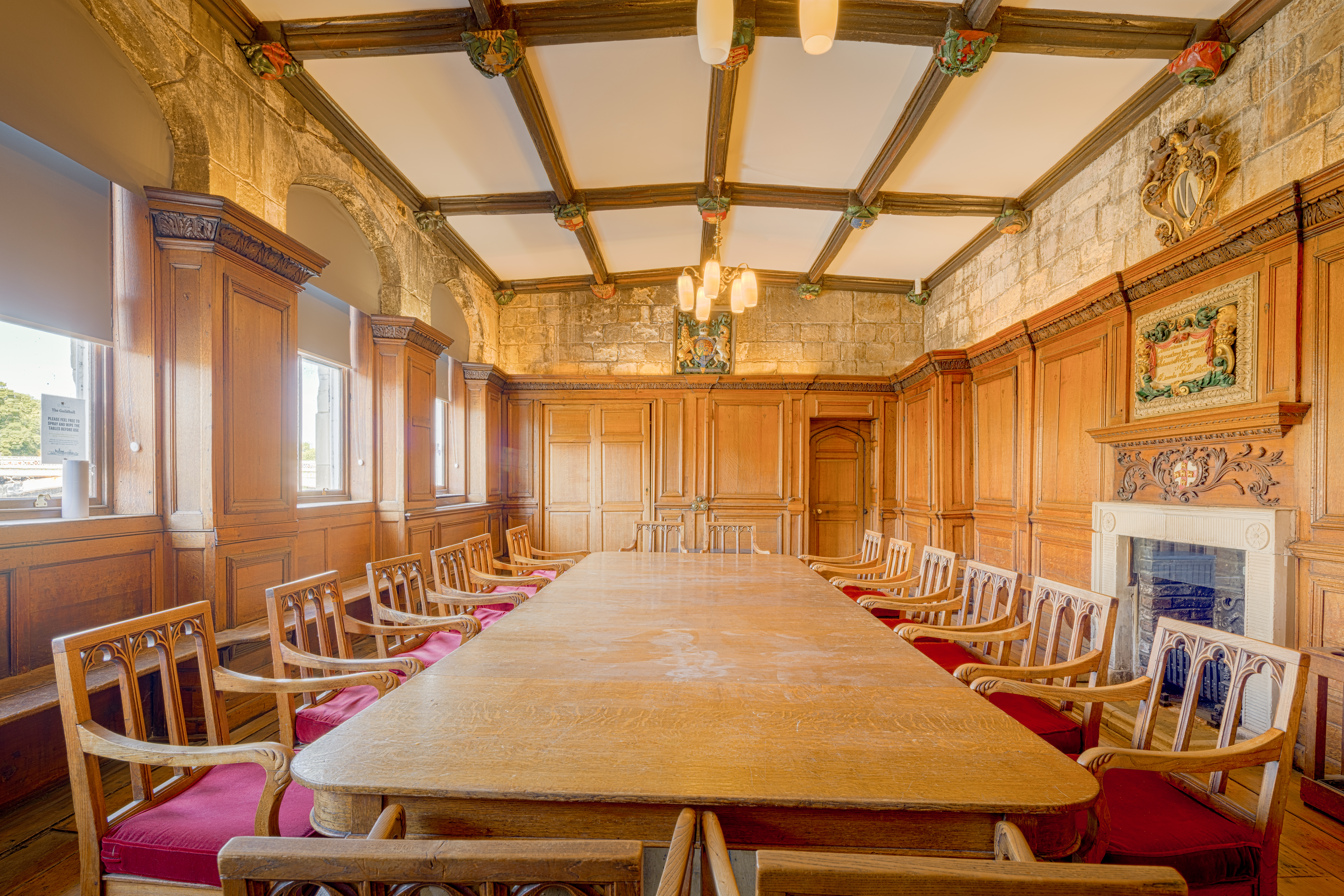
Committee Room 1

== See also ==
- Grade I listed buildings in the City of York
- Listed buildings in York (within the city walls, northern part)
