= Fishergate =

Street in York, England

Coordinates: 53.946°N 1.072°W

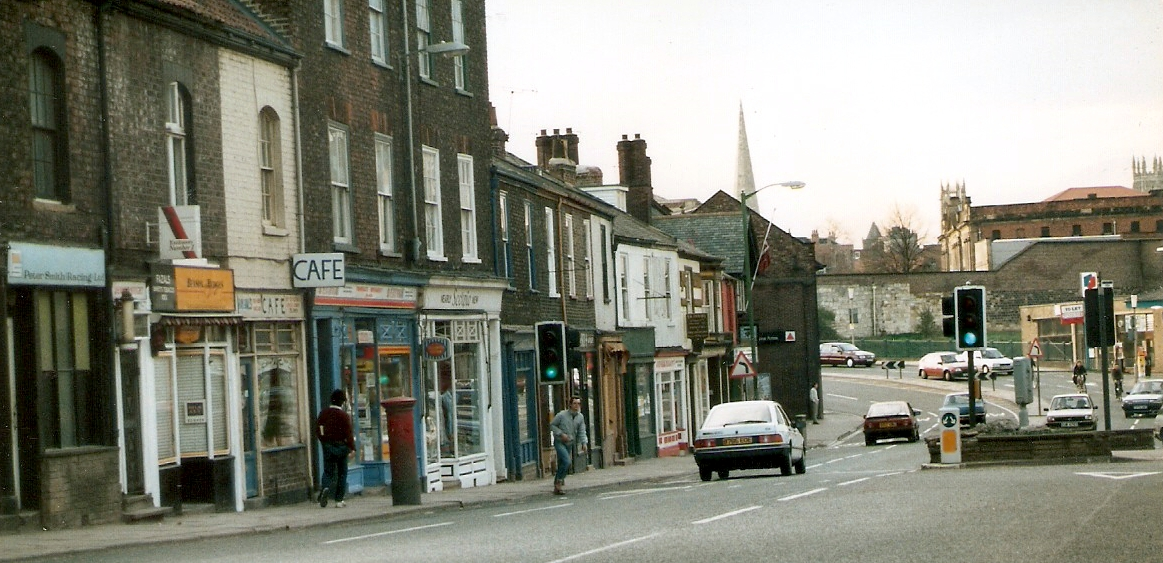
- Main Street, Fishergate

- Location within North Yorkshire
- OS grid reference: SE607510
  - London: 177 mi (285 km) S
- Civil parish: Fishergate
- Unitary authority: York
- Ceremonial county: North Yorkshire
- Region: Yorkshire and the Humber
- Country: England
- Sovereign state: United Kingdom
- Post town: YORK
- Postcode district: YO10
- Police: North Yorkshire
- Fire: North Yorkshire
- Ambulance: Yorkshire
- UK Parliament: York Central

Fishergate is a street and surrounding area of York, England.

== History ==
Fishergate runs along a strip of slightly raised ground east of the River Ouse. Archaeological investigations have found evidence of prehistoric occupation before the construction of Roman Eboracum. By the 1st century, a major Roman road extended south from the city, passing through what is now Fishergate Bar, following the path of Fawcett Street, and eventually aligning with the modern route of Fishergate. Cemeteries also existed in the area. In Anglian times, the area became the city's principal manufacturing and trading centre.

Excavations in 1985–86 uncovered traces of 8th–9th-century timber buildings, along with metalwork, bone and leather waste indicative of industrial activity. The area remained occupied in the Jorvik period, during which the old Roman road became known as "Fiscergate", the street of the fishers. St Helen's Church was built west of Fishergate, and All Saints’ Church to its east. An anchoress, Isabel German (d. 1448), lived at All Saints', and her remains were discovered in 2007. In the 14th century, the York city walls were constructed immediately north of the northernmost part of the street, probably over an existing earth rampart, with Fishergate Bar rebuilt in stone.

In the 12th century, St Andrew's Priory was built to the west of Fishergate. Following the Dissolution of the Monasteries, the land was probably used as an orchard, and the medieval settlement soon disappeared, possibly due to destruction during the Siege of York in 1644. In 1730, New Walk was laid out beside the river, and Fishergate became a popular residential area, with several large houses constructed. In 1827, a cattle market opened at the northern end of the street, and the modern line of the northern section was established further west, with the old route becoming Fawcett Street and Escrick Terrace. To its west lay the Redfearn National Glass Factory and open land. In the 1950s, factories were built on this land, and the glassworks relocated to Tadcaster. These industrial buildings were cleared in the late 20th century.

== Layout and architecture ==
The street runs south-east from the River Foss at Castle Mills Bridge, as the continuation of Tower Street. It turns south and continues until it becomes Fulford Road, at its junction with New Walk Terrace and Grange Garth. On its east side, it has junctions with Piccadilly, Paragon Street, Kent Street, Escrick Terrace, Escrick Street, Melbourne Street and Winterscale Street, while on its west side, it has junctions with Oxtoby Court, Fewster Way, Blue Bridge Lane, Marlborough Grange and Sandringham Street. The street forms part of the A1036, and its section from Castle Mills Bridge to Escrick Terrace is part of the inner ring road, with the section from Paragon Street to Escrick Terrace is open to northbound traffic only.

Notable buildings on the east side street include part of the city walls; the Edinburgh Arms pub, built as a house in 1830; No. 29, a late-18th-century building which served for a time as the nunnery of the Sisters of St Vincent; the early-19th-century Ivy Cottage; and Fishergate Primary School, built in 1893 by W. H. Brierley.

On the west side lie the Masons Arms, a pub built in 1935 to a design by James Knight; Nos. 16–40, a terrace built in 1830; an early-21st-century bingo hall; and The Lighthorseman, a pub built in about 1870. Fishergate House, built in 1837 by J. B. and William Atkinson, formerly had an address on the street but is now said to lie on Blue Bridge Lane.

== Ward ==
In the 2003 local elections, the Green Party were elected in both Fishergate Ward council seats and these seats have been held since, most recently in the 2019 council elections. The population of the ward at the 2011 Census was 9,844.

== Gallery ==
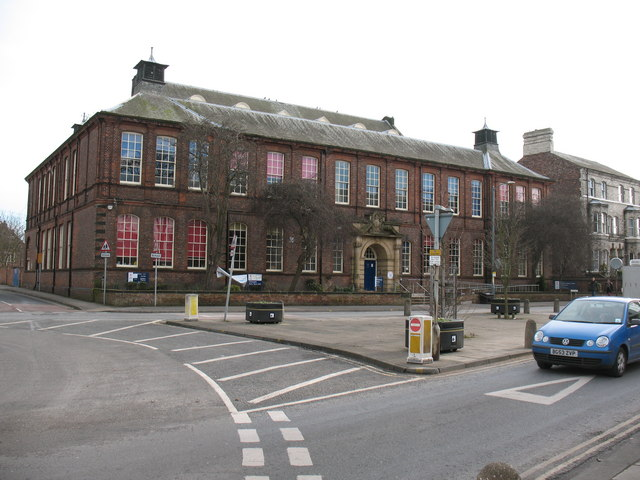
Fishergate Primary School

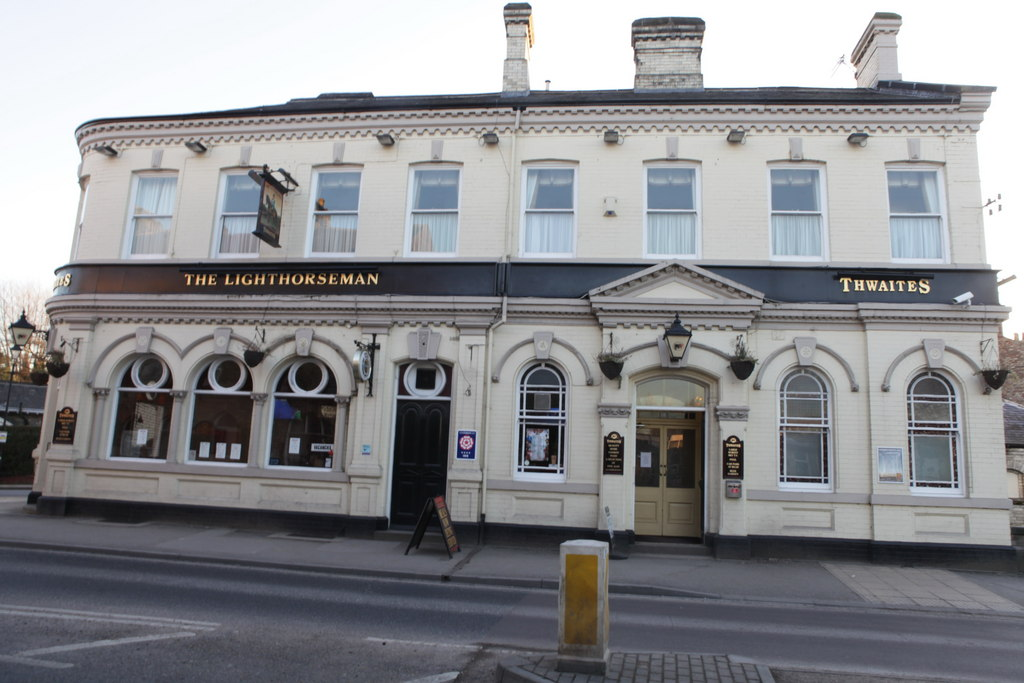
The Lighthorseman

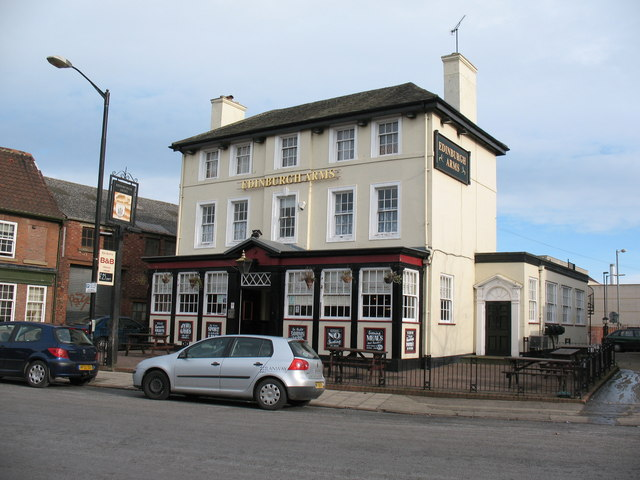
The Edinburgh Arms

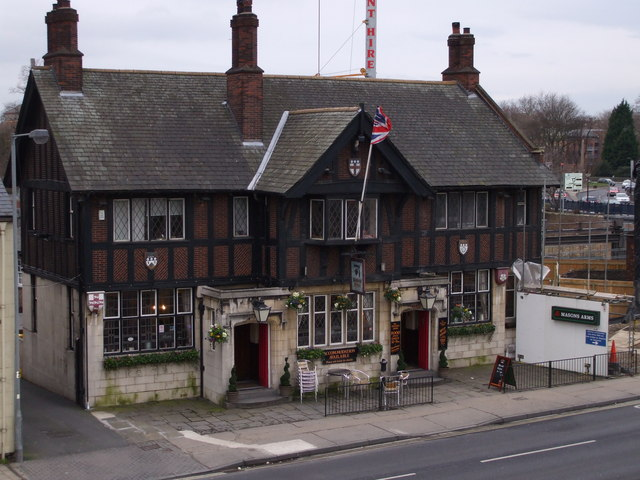
The Masons Arms
