= Roberto Morandotti =

Italian physicist

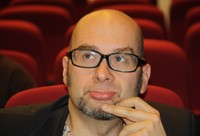
- Awards: Fellow, American Physical Society (2014); Fellow, Institute of Physics (2014); Fellow, IEEE (2021); Fellow of the Royal Society of Canada (2012); Fellow, SPIE (2012); Fellow, OSA (2011); Fellow, AAAS (2020); NSERC Fellow, E.W.R. Steacie Memorial (2011); NSERC Synergy Award Recipient(2019); NSERC Brockhouse Award Recipient(2020); Marie-Victorin Award Recipient(2022); Urgel-Archambault Award Recipient (2023)
- Scientific career
- Fields: Physicist and Electrical Engineering
- Institutions: Institut national de la recherche scientifique
- Website: Nonlinear Photonics Group

Notes
- Google scholar page of Roberto Morandotti

Roberto Morandotti is a physicist and full Professor, working in the Energy Materials Telecommunications Department of the Institut National de la Recherche Scientifique (INRS-EMT, Montreal, Canada). The work of his team includes the areas of integrated and quantum photonics, nonlinear and singular optics, as well as terahertz photonics.

== Educational background ==
- 1993: M.Sc. Physics, University of Genoa
- 1999: Ph.D. Electrical Engineering, University of Glasgow

== Professional background ==
- 1999-2001: Postdoctoral Researcher, Weizmann Institute of Science
- 2001-2002: Postdoctoral Researcher, University of Toronto
- 2003-2008: Associate Professor, INRS-EMT, Université du Québec
- 2008 - : Full Professor, INRS-EMT, Université du Québec

== Professional recognition, honors and awards ==
- Excellence Prize for Scholar Merit, Rotary Association
- PhD fellowship, Bilateral UK – Israeli Fund
- Postdoctoral Fellowship, Engineering and Physical Sciences Research Council (EPRSC) (UK)
- Postdoctoral Fellowship, Weizmann Institute of Science
- Marie Curie European Community Fellowship
- Postdoctoral Fellowship, University of Toronto
- FQRNT (Fonds québécois de la recherche sur la nature et les technologies) Strategic Professor
- Fellow of the Royal Society of Canada
- Fellow of the Engineering Institute of Canada
- Fellow of the Canadian Academy of Engineering
- Fellow, Institute of Nanotechnology (IoN)
- Full Member (Fellow), Sigma Xi, the Scientific Research Society
- Fellow of the OSA (Optical Society), for "seminal contributions to the field of nonlinear optics, in particular for the discovery of discrete optical solitons"
- Fellow of the SPIE, for "achievements in nonlinear optics and magneto-optics"
- Fellow of the Institute of Physics
- Fellow of the American Physical Society for "pioneering contributions in discrete optics, nonlinear dynamics, and nonlinear optics in the THz domain"
- Fellow of the American Association for the Advancement of Science for "distinguished contributions to the field of nonlinear and quantum optics"
- Fellow of the Institute for Electrical and Electronic Engineering for "contributions to integrated nonlinear and quantum optics"
- NSERC E.W.R. Steacie Memorial Fellow
- NSERC Synergy Award Recipient
- NSERC Brockhouse Award Recipient
- Marie-Victorin Award Recipient
- Urgel-Archambault Award Recipient
- UQ Leadership in Research Award
- IEEE Quantum Electronic Award
- Optica Max Born Award

== Most important scientific contributions ==
1. Experimental demonstration of discrete solitons and their dynamical properties.
2. Demonstration of Anderson Localisations and band gap structures in waveguide arrays.
3. Kerr spatio-temporal solitons in a planar glass waveguide (light bullets) and liquid crystals, X waves in bi-dispersive media, self-accelerating non-diffractive beams
4. Ultrafast, extremely low power nonlinear optics in glass and semiconductor integrated waveguides
5. Various contributions in the fields of linear and nonlinear optics in the THz Regime: A state of the art high power THz source to probe the nonlinear interaction of intense few-cycle terahertz pulses, demonstration of nonlinear wavelength conversion using THz waves, of new THz characterization techniques, including the first THz Optical Isolator.
6. Demonstration of multiphoton, multidimensional and cluster complex quantum states using optical micro combs
