= Kramm =

Kramm is a surname. Notable people with the surname include:

- Ada Kramm (1899–1981), Norwegian actress
- Bruno Kramm (born 1967), German musician
- Heinz Kramm known professionally as Heino (born 1938), German schlager singer
- Joseph Kramm (1907–1992), American playwright, actor and director
- Kenny Kramm (1961–2016), American entrepreneur
- Lars Kramm, British-German politician and scouting official
- Ulrike Kramm, German chemist and academic
