= 2019 City of York Council election =

2019 council election in York, England

- 2 May 2019

All 47 seats to City of York Council 24 seats needed for a majority
	First party	Second party
Leader	Keith Aspden	Janet Looker
Party	Liberal Democrats	Labour
Leader's seat	Fulford and Heslington	Guildhall
Last election	12	15
Seats before	11	13
Seats won	21	17
Seat change	▲9	▲2
Popular vote	48,247	39,750
Percentage	34.5%	28.4%
Swing	▲10.6%	▲2.8%
	Third party	Fourth party
Leader	Andy D'Agorne	Ian Gillies (retiring)
Party	Green	Conservative
Leader's seat	Fishergate	Rural West York
Last election	4	14
Seats before	4	10
Seats won	4	2
Seat change	Steady	▼12
Popular vote	23,842	21,707
Percentage	17.0%	15.5%
Swing	▲1.4%	▼12.8%
- Map of results of 2019 election
Leader before election
Ian Gillies
Conservative
Leader
Keith Aspden
Liberal Democrat

Elections to City of York Council were held on 2 May 2019, as part of the United Kingdom local elections. The election resulted in substantial gains for the Liberal Democrats, who became the largest party, although no party surpassed the 24-seat majority threshold. The Conservatives suffered badly in this election, and lost 12 of the 14 seats they had won at the previous election. The Green Party held all their four seats, and surpassed the Conservatives in the popular vote. Labour gained two seats, although they failed to gain support in rural areas, where voters favoured the Liberal Democrats. On 14 May, The Liberal Democrats and the Green Party announced that they had agreed to run the council in a new 'progressive partnership' coalition, with Green Party leader Andy D'Agorne assuming the role of Deputy Leader of the Council while Liberal Democrat leader Keith Aspden succeeded Ian Gillies as Leader of the Council.

== Background ==
In October 2015, Dafydd Williams stepped down as leader of the local Labour Party with Janet Looker appointed to the role. Council leader Chris Steward resigned as leader of the Conservative group for health reasons in May 2016 and was replaced by David Carr. Labour Councillors Julie Gunnell and David Levene resigned in 2017 for personal reasons. The seats were retained by Labour candidates Jonny Crawshaw and Michael Pavlovic in the by-elections held in June 2017.

Council Leader David Carr was replaced by Ian Gillies as leader of the Conservative group in January 2018 after losing a vote of no confidence. Labour councillor Sonja Crisp stepped down due to ill health, her seat was retained by Labour candidate Kallum Taylor in February 2018. Former leader David Carr and councillor Susan Mercer resigned from the Conservative Party in February 2018 due to “unbridgeable differences” within the local Conservative group to sit as independents. The makeup of the Council was now 15 Labour, 12 Liberal Democrats, 12 Conservative, four Green and four independent councillors; the Conservative/Liberal Democrat joint administration had a majority of one. Ian Gillies was elected leader of the Council in March. In August Labour councillors Fiona Derbyshire and Hilary Shepherd resigned from the Labour Party to sit as Independent Socialists York, leaving the makeup of the Council as 13 Labour, 12 Liberal Democrats, 12 Conservatives, four Greens and six Independents. In March Liberal Democrat councillor Sheena Jackson resigned from the Liberal Democrats Party to sit as an independent, leaving the makeup of the Council as 13 Labour, 11 Liberal Democrats, 12 Conservatives, four Greens and seven Independents, leaving the Conservative and Liberal Democrat coalition without a majority for the end of the term.

== Result ==
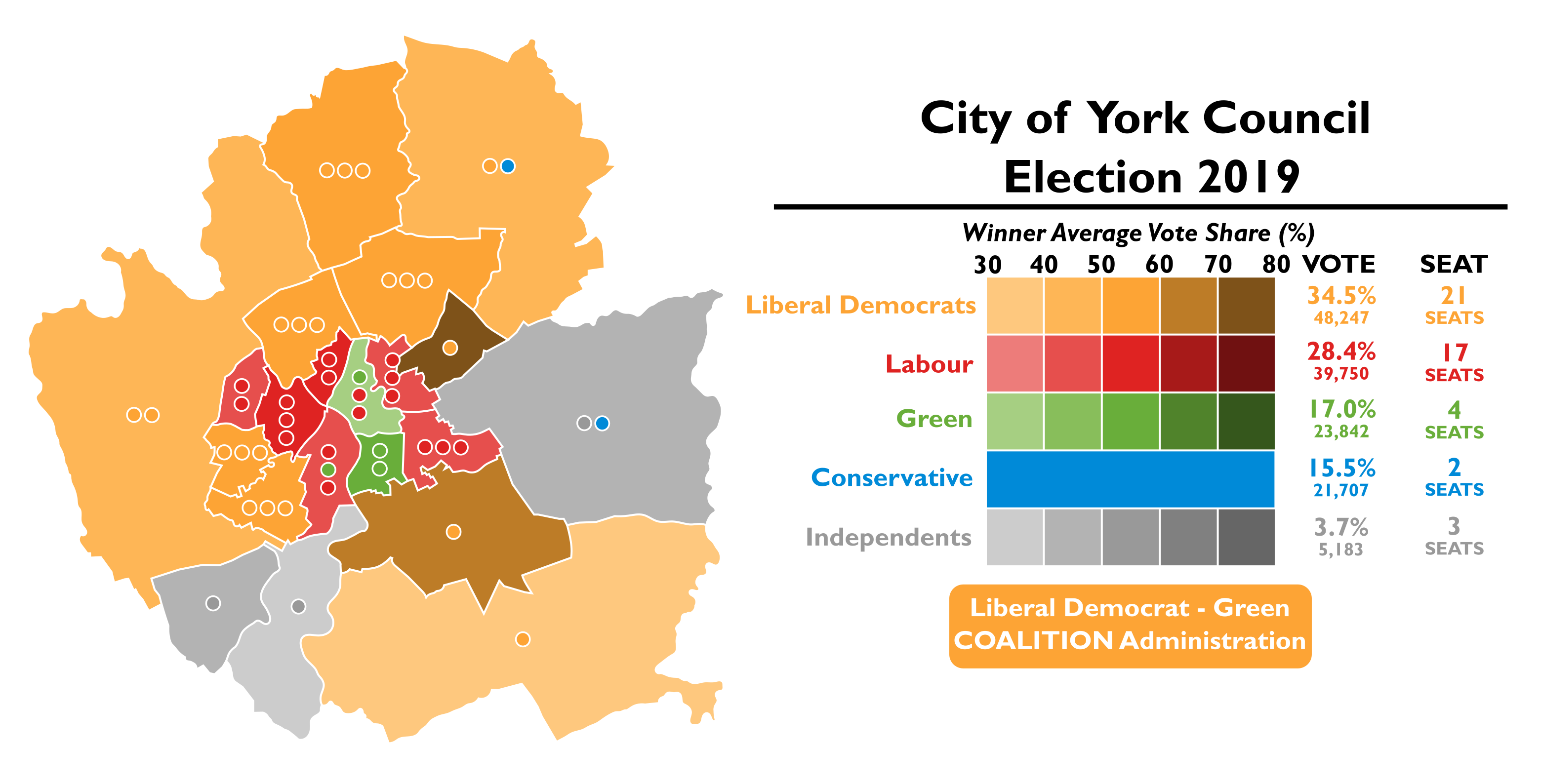
Results Map of the 2019 City of York Council Election.

City of York Council
Party	Candidates						Votes		
Party	Stood	Elected	Gained	Unseated	Net	% of total	%	No.	Net %
Liberal Democrats	47	21	9	0	+9	44.7	34.5	48,247	+10.6
Labour	47	17	2	0	+2	36.2	28.4	39,750	+2.8
Green	47	4	0	0	0	8.5	17.0	23,842	+1.4
Independent	10	3	2	1	+1	6.4	3.7	5,183	+0.3
Conservative	47	2	0	12	-12	4.3	15.5	21,707	-12.8
UKIP	2	0	0	0	0	0	0.5	662	-1.9
Women's Equality	1	0	0	0	0	0	0.3	389	N/A
Socialist Alternative	1	0	0	0	0	0	0.1	148	N/A

== Ward results ==
=== Acomb ward ===
Acomb
Party	Candidate	Votes	%	±%
Labour	Katie Lomas	1,105	45.2	+16.6
Labour	Stuart Barnes *	1,021	41.8	+9.5
Conservative	Keith Myers *	590	24.1	−7.8
Independent	Brian Watson †	465	19.0	N/A
Conservative	Matthew Greenwood	429	17.6	−7.9
Green	Jonathan Pitt	322	13.2	+2.0
Green	Tom Franklin	270	11.0	+2.5
Liberal Democrats	Quentin MacDonald ‡	202	8.3	−5.8
Liberal Democrats	Matt Ward-Perkins	142	5.8	−4.4
Turnout		2,461	36.7	−30.6
Labour hold				
Labour gain from Conservative				

* Represented the Acomb ward of City of York Council, 2015-2019

† Represented the Acomb ward of York City Council, 1979–1984, the Guildhall ward of York City Council, 1988–1996, the Acomb division of North Yorkshire County Council, 1981–1989, and the Guildhall ward of City of York Council, 1995-2015

‡ Represented the Upper Poppleton ward of City of York Council, 1995–2003, and the Rural West York ward of City of York Council, 2003-2007

=== Bishopthorpe ward ===
The parishes of Acaster Malbis and Bishopthorpe

Bishopthorpe
Party	Candidate	Votes	%	±%
Independent	John Galvin *	568	33.0	−16.3
Green	Carole Green	539	31.3	+25.3
Conservative	Michael Nicholls	360	20.9	−28.4
Labour	Bob Scrase †	155	9.0	−6.7
Liberal Democrats	Daniel Khan	99	5.8	+0.2
Turnout		1,721	51.6	−25.9
Independent gain from Conservative				

* Represented the Copmanthorpe ward of City of York Council, 1999–2003, and the Bishopthorpe ward of City of York Council, 2007-2019

† Represented the Holgate ward of York City Council, 1992–1996, and the Holgate ward of City of York Council, 1995-2003

=== Clifton ward ===
Clifton
Party	Candidate	Votes	%	±%
Labour	Danny Myers *	1,291	58.3	+20.7
Labour	Margaret Wells *	1,126	50.8	+22.4
Green	Alan Dunnett	408	18.4	+2.5
Conservative	Alfie Thomlinson	374	16.9	−3.1
Conservative	Richard Schofield	342	15.4	−1.6
Green	John Walford	322	14.5	+0.4
Liberal Democrats	Tobie Abel	241	10.9	−2.4
Liberal Democrats	Mark Waudby †	193	8.7	+1.4
Turnout		2,228	33.8	−26.6
Labour hold				
Labour hold				

* Represented the Clifton ward of City of York Council, 2015-2019

† Represented the Rawcliffe and Skelton ward of City of York Council, 1999–2003, and the Skelton, Rawcliffe, and Clifton Without ward of City of York Council, 2003-2007

=== Copmanthorpe ward ===
The parish of Copmanthorpe

Copmanthorpe
Party	Candidate	Votes	%	±%
Independent	David Carr *	662	46.2	−4.3
Conservative	Matthew Freckelton	258	18.0	−32.5
Liberal Democrats	Richard Brown	254	17.7	−8.3
Green	Lars Kramm †	159	11.1	+4.2
Labour	William Owen	99	6.9	−9.8
Turnout		1,432	42.9	−32.8
Independent gain from Conservative				

* Represented the Copmanthorpe ward of City of York Council, 2015-2019

† Represented the Micklegate ward of City of York Council, 2015-2019

=== Dringhouses and Woodthorpe ward ===
Dringhouses and Woodthorpe
Party	Candidate	Votes	%	±%
Liberal Democrats	Stephen Fenton *	2,402	57.7	+17.7
Liberal Democrats	Paula Widdowson	2,263	54.3	+7.5
Liberal Democrats	Ashley Mason *	2,247	54.0	+18.3
Labour	Cathryn Auplish	705	16.9	−1.8
Labour	Tracy White	681	16.4	−1.1
Labour	Graham Gatman	671	16.1	+0.7
Conservative	Amanda Ashman	463	11.1	−15.0
Conservative	David Atkinson	445	10.7	−13.0
Conservative	Timothy Ashman	425	10.2	−11.8
Green	Bronwen Gray	410	9.8	+0.2
Independent	Scott Marmion	341	8.2	N/A
UKIP	Rob Gray	318	7.6	−4.3
Green	John Gray	298	7.2	−0.5
Green	Ginevra House	282	6.8	−0.1
Turnout		4,171	46.0	−26.4
Liberal Democrats hold				
Liberal Democrats hold				
Liberal Democrats hold				

* Represented the Dringhouses and Woodthorpe ward of City of York Council, 2015-2019

=== Fishergate ward ===
Fishergate
Party	Candidate	Votes	%	±%
Green	Andy D'Agorne *	1,553	62.4	+1.8
Green	Dave Taylor †	1,381	55.5	+1.5
Labour	Barbara Boyce ‡	663	26.6	+0.3
Labour	Dan Kettlewell	566	22.7	+1.5
Conservative	Stephen Munro	222	8.9	−7.0
Conservative	Robin Willoughby	169	6.8	−8.7
Liberal Democrats	Monta Drozdova	141	5.7	−1.7
Liberal Democrats	Paul Mulvey	135	5.4	+1.2
Turnout		2,510	44.0	−22.2
Green hold				
Green hold				

* Represented the Fishergate ward of City of York Council, 2003-2019

† Represented the Fishergate ward of City of York Council, 2007-2019

‡ Represented the Heworth ward of City of York Council, 2009-2019

=== Fulford and Heslington ward ===
The parish of Fulford and part of the parish of Heslington

Fulford and Heslington
Party	Candidate	Votes	%	±%
Liberal Democrats	Keith Aspden *	916	68.0	+12.4
Labour	Anne Kerr	239	17.7	+1.1
Green	Susie Taylor	99	7.3	±0.0
Conservative	Eileen Dickinson	94	7.0	−13.5
Turnout		1,348	49.0	−21.6
Liberal Democrats hold				

* Represented the Fulford ward of City of York Council, 2003–2015, and the Fulford and Heslington ward of City of York Council, 2015-2019

=== Guildhall ward ===
Guildhall
Party	Candidate	Votes	%	±%
Green	Denise Craghill *	1,492	49.3	+14.5
Labour	Fiona Fitzpatrick †	1,198	39.6	+13.7
Labour	Janet Looker ‡	1,151	38.0	+8.2
Green	June Tranmer	1,076	35.5	+12.5
Labour	James Flinders *	1,050	34.7	+4.8
Green	Danni Makin	977	32.3	+12.8
Conservative	Dawn Argyle	429	14.2	−8.0
Conservative	David Barratt	409	13.5	−6.9
Conservative	Robin Dickson §	374	12.4	−5.7
Liberal Democrats	Jamie Butler	271	9.0	−3.3
Liberal Democrats	Jack McAteer	226	7.5	−1.9
Liberal Democrats	Matthew Smithson	191	6.3	+1.6
Turnout		3,062	35.3	−18.5
Green hold				
Labour hold				
Labour hold				

* Represented the Guildhall ward of City of York Council, 2015-2019

† Represented the Hull Road ward of City of York Council, 2011-2015

‡ Represented the Guildhall division of North Yorkshire County Council, 1985–1996, and the Guildhall ward of City of York Council, 1995-2019

§ Represented the Fishergate division of North Yorkshire County Council, 1989-1993

=== Haxby and Wigginton ward ===
The parishes of Haxby and Wigginton

Haxby and Wigginton
Party	Candidate	Votes	%	±%
Liberal Democrats	Ian Cuthbertson *	2,872	63.7	+26.2
Liberal Democrats	Andrew Hollyer	2,819	62.5	+28.8
Liberal Democrats	Edward Pearson	2,806	62.2	+33.0
Conservative	Roy Watson-Smith	810	18.0	−15.1
Conservative	Joe Pattinson	725	16.1	−20.4
Conservative	Margaret Young	673	14.9	−20.8
Independent	Tony Richardson †	515	11.4	−25.1
Independent	Neil Wyatt	422	9.4	+3.6
Green	Jess Dixon	284	6.3	−2.1
Labour	Caroline Hind	274	6.1	−9.5
Labour	Lindsay Walter	227	5.0	−8.3
Labour	Albert Ward	216	4.8	−8.0
Green	Liz Scurfield	200	4.4	−1.3
Green	David Williams	155	3.4	−1.4
Turnout		4,528	47.3	−24.4
Liberal Democrats hold				
Liberal Democrats gain from Conservative				
Liberal Democrats gain from Conservative				

* Represented the Strensall ward of City of York Council, 2003–2007, and the Haxby and Wigginton ward of City of York Council, 2011-2019

† Represented the Haxby and Wigginton ward of City of York Council, 2011-2019

=== Heworth ward ===
Heworth
Party	Candidate	Votes	%	±%
Labour	Claire Douglas	1,615	52.1	+16.3
Labour	Anna Perrett	1,375	44.4	+9.6
Labour	Robert Webb	1,308	42.2	+9.1
Green	Nicola Normandale	629	20.3	+3.0
Green	Sabine Janssen-Havercroft	542	17.5	−3.7
Conservative	Teri Rhodes	527	17.0	−5.8
Conservative	George Coxshall	461	14.9	−9.1
Conservative	Jacob Groet	451	14.6	+10.0
Liberal Democrats	Steve Jones	424	13.7	−5.7
Green	Andy Wilson	407	13.1	−1.9
Liberal Democrats	Jonathan Morley *	392	12.6	+1.1
Women's Equality	Sally Duffin	389	12.6	N/A
Liberal Democrats	Ben Rich	272	8.8	+1.1
Socialist Alternative	Nigel Smith	148	4.8	−1.6
Turnout		3,150	33.5	−27.8
Labour hold				
Labour hold				
Labour hold				

* Represented the Osbaldwick / Heworth division of North Yorkshire County Council, 1985–1996, and the Osbaldwick ward of City of York Council, 1999-2011

=== Heworth Without ward ===
The parish of Heworth Without

Heworth Without
Party	Candidate	Votes	%	±%
Liberal Democrats	Nigel Ayre *	1,318	75.8	+23.4
Conservative	Brannan Coady	160	9.2	−13.1
Labour	Andrew Garbutt	136	7.8	−6.0
Green	Alison Webb	124	7.1	+1.6
Turnout		1,738	52.1	−23.8
Liberal Democrats hold				

* Represented the Heworth Without ward of City of York Council, 2007-2019

=== Holgate ward ===
Holgate
Party	Candidate	Votes	%	±%
Labour	Kallum Taylor *	2,013	58.0	+24.1
Labour	Rachel Melly	1,801	51.9	+20.2
Labour	David Heaton	1,787	51.5	+23.7
Green	Andreas Heinemeyer	641	18.5	+3.7
Green	Pam Hanley	601	17.3	−2.5
Liberal Democrats	Emma Keef	574	16.5	+0.7
Green	Caleb Rowan	540	15.6	+2.0
Liberal Democrats	Emilie Knight	460	13.3	+0.1
Conservative	Janet Powell	418	12.0	−11.6
Liberal Democrats	Aileen Hingston	399	11.5	−1.1
Conservative	Tet Powell	367	10.6	−8.4
Conservative	Sophie Burn	338	9.7	−5.2
Turnout		3,503	38.3	−27.4
Labour hold				
Labour hold				
Labour hold				

* Represented the Holgate ward of City of York Council, 2018-2019

=== Hull Road ward ===
Part of the parish of Heslington

Hull Road
Party	Candidate	Votes	%	±%
Labour Co-op	Aisling Musson	1,032	45.9	+9.4
Labour Co-op	Michael Pavlovic *	979	43.5	+13.0
Labour Co-op	George Norman	912	40.6	+11.4
Green	Patrick Thelwell	626	27.8	+9.0
Green	John Cossham	523	23.3	−2.4
Green	Candy Spillard	400	17.8	+2.2
Conservative	Jordan Hennessy	328	14.6	−7.2
Conservative	Robert Ward	322	14.3	−8.6
Conservative	Carl Mellor	304	13.5	−9.1
Independent	Hilary Shepherd †	268	11.9	−18.6
Liberal Democrats	Katharine Macy	263	11.7	+0.6
Liberal Democrats	Chris Small	253	11.3	+2.3
Liberal Democrats	Ian Murphy	187	8.3	±0.0
Turnout		2,264	30.7	−14.0
Labour Co-op hold				
Labour Co-op hold				
Labour Co-op hold				

* Represented the Hull Road ward of City of York Council, 2017-2019

† Represented the Hull Road ward of City of York Council, 2015-2019

=== Huntington and New Earswick ward ===
The parishes of Huntington and New Earswick

Huntington and New Earswick
Party	Candidate	Votes	%	±%
Liberal Democrats	Keith Orrell *	2,114	57.1	+12.0
Liberal Democrats	Carol Runciman †	2,087	56.3	+12.3
Liberal Democrats	Chris Cullwick ‡	2,075	56.0	+11.3
Labour	Chloe Anderson	710	19.2	−3.1
Labour	Ian Craven	668	18.0	+0.2
Labour	Wendy Loveday	624	16.8	−0.9
Green	Clive Woolley	385	10.4	+0.7
Green	Martina Weitsch	372	10.0	+1.1
Conservative	Fiona Duncan	350	9.4	−12.3
UKIP	Sandra Fairley	344	9.3	N/A
Green	Charles Everett	312	8.4	−2.4
Conservative	Sally Page	310	8.4	−11.4
Conservative	Benjamin Tait	296	8.0	−9.7
Turnout		3,719	38.1	−25.6
Liberal Democrats hold				
Liberal Democrats hold				
Liberal Democrats hold				

* Represented the Huntington and New Earswick ward of City of York Council, 2003-2019

† Represented the Huntington and New Earswick ward of City of York Council, 1999-2019

‡ Represented the Huntington and New Earswick ward of City of York Council, 2015-2019

=== Micklegate ward ===
Micklegate
Party	Candidate	Votes	%	±%
Labour	Jonny Crawshaw *	2,408	54.9	+19.2
Green	Rosie Baker	1,954	44.6	+16.0
Labour	Pete Kilbane	1,913	43.6	+19.6
Labour	Sandi Redpath	1,746	39.8	+18.0
Green	Sam Biram	1,313	29.9	+7.2
Green	Vera Gool	1,052	24.0	+1.7
Conservative	John Brewin	457	10.4	−9.5
Conservative	Jennie Gambold	449	10.2	−6.3
Conservative	Bill Gambold	436	9.9	−6.4
Liberal Democrats	Carlotta Allum	407	9.3	+2.6
Liberal Democrats	Kate Webster	349	8.0	+1.1
Liberal Democrats	Christopher Gammie	293	6.7	+2.4
Turnout		4,420	48.0	−21.5
Labour hold				
Labour gain from Independent				
Green hold				

* Represented the Micklegate ward of City of York Council, 2017-2019

=== Osbaldwick and Derwent ward ===
The parishes of Dunnington, Holtby, Kexby, Murton, and Osbaldwick

Osbaldwick and Derwent
Party	Candidate	Votes	%	±%
Independent	Mark Warters *	1,293	49.9	+22.7
Conservative	Martin Rowley	755	29.1	−17.3
Conservative	John Zimnoch	511	19.7	−7.4
Green	Ginnie Shaw	506	19.5	+10.2
Liberal Democrats	Ian Eiloart	325	12.5	−9.3
Labour	Kevin Farnsworth	325	12.5	−3.4
Labour	Lata Narayanaswamy	300	11.6	+0.9
Liberal Democrats	James Blanchard	263	10.1	+0.3
Green	Paul Hutchinson	229	8.8	+1.6
Turnout		2,600	41.3	−30.2
Independent hold				
Conservative hold				

* Represented the Osbaldwick ward of City of York Council, 2011–2015, and the Osbaldwick and Derwent ward of City of York Council, 2015-2019

=== Rawcliffe and Clifton Without ward ===
The parishes of Clifton Without and Rawcliffe

Rawcliffe and Clifton Without
Party	Candidate	Votes	%	±%
Liberal Democrats	Darryl Smalley	2,219	56.1	+30.9
Liberal Democrats	Derek Wann	2,149	54.4	+29.5
Liberal Democrats	Sam Waudby	2,128	53.8	+31.3
Conservative	Charlotte Milligan	746	18.9	−11.6
Labour	Rebecca Fewtrell	729	18.4	−6.2
Conservative	Peter Dew *	721	18.2	−19.0
Conservative	Stuart Rawlings *	711	18.0	−15.4
Labour	Dave Merrett †	692	17.5	−5.6
Labour	Will Bossman	642	16.2	−5.4
Green	Jill Armstrong	295	7.5	−1.4
Green	Andy Dearden	281	7.1	+0.3
Green	Rod Bell	211	5.3	−2.4
Turnout		3,997	41.8	−23.7
Liberal Democrats gain from Conservative				
Liberal Democrats gain from Conservative				
Liberal Democrats gain from Conservative				

* Represented the Rawcliffe and Clifton Without ward of City of York Council, 2015-2019

† Represented the Bishophill ward of York City Council, 1982–1996, the Bishophill ward of City of York Council, 1995–2003, and the Micklegate ward of City of York Council, 2003-2015

=== Rural West York ward ===
The parishes of Askham Bryan, Askham Richard, Hessay, Nether Poppleton, Rufforth with Knapton, Skelton, and Upper Poppleton

Rural West York
Party	Candidate	Votes	%	±%
Liberal Democrats	Anne Hook	1,570	54.4	+32.6
Liberal Democrats	James Barker	1,260	43.6	+33.9
Conservative	Robin Garland	1,019	35.3	−16.4
Conservative	Chris Steward *	952	33.0	−10.7
Labour	Andrew Carter	233	8.1	−6.0
Green	Ginevra Gordon	214	7.4	−0.5
Labour	Mark Windmill	206	7.1	−4.4
Green	Mark Havercroft	171	5.9	−1.7
Turnout		2,908	48.5	−25.0
Liberal Democrats gain from Conservative				
Liberal Democrats gain from Conservative				

* Represented the Rural West York ward of City of York Council, 2011-2019

=== Strensall ward ===
The parishes of Earswick, Stockton-on-the-Forest, and Strensall with Towthorpe

Strensall
Party	Candidate	Votes	%	±%
Liberal Democrats	Tony Fisher *	1,200	51.5	+20.1
Conservative	Paul Doughty †	960	41.2	−13.6
Conservative	Sian Wiseman ‡	814	35.0	−8.3
Liberal Democrats	Danielle Mason	738	31.7	+13.9
Labour	Paul Clarke	213	9.1	−4.8
Green	Catherine Love	211	9.1	+3.5
Green	Ross Bennett	183	7.9	+0.7
Labour	Liam Penny	182	7.8	−4.4
Turnout		2,347	37.1	−30.3
Liberal Democrats gain from Conservative				
Conservative hold				

* Represented the Haxby West ward of Ryedale District Council, 1987-1996

† Represented the Strensall ward of City of York Council, 2011-2019

‡ Represented the Strensall ward of City of York Council, 2007-2015

=== Westfield ward ===
Westfield
Party	Candidate	Votes	%	±%
Liberal Democrats	Andrew Waller *	2,048	59.4	+10.3
Liberal Democrats	Sue Hunter †	1,870	54.3	+13.7
Liberal Democrats	Simon Daubeney	1,653	48.0	+11.9
Labour	Louise Corson	945	27.4	+0.6
Labour	Jason Rose	870	25.3	+0.2
Labour	Fasil Demsash	836	24.3	+4.0
Independent	Sheena Jackson †	316	9.2	−16.9
Green	Sebastian Butterworth	288	8.4	−0.9
Green	Jonathan Tyler	245	7.1	−4.0
Green	Mikael Hanson	226	6.6	−3.2
Conservative	James Blenkinsop	178	5.2	−8.0
Conservative	Charles Brooks	174	5.1	−8.3
Conservative	Samuel Lisle	144	4.2	−7.0
Turnout		3,476	35.3	−23.2
Liberal Democrats hold				
Liberal Democrats hold				
Liberal Democrats hold				

* Represented the Westfield ward of York City Council, 1994–1996, and the Westfield ward of City of York Council, 1999–2011 and 2014-2019

† Represented the Westfield ward of City of York Council, 2015-2019

=== Wheldrake ward ===
The parishes of Deighton, Elvington, Naburn, and Wheldrake

Wheldrake
Party	Candidate	Votes	%	±%
Liberal Democrats	Christian Vassie *	537	34.1	+23.1
Conservative	Wesley Coultas	457	29.1	−35.0
Independent	Suzie Mercer †	333	21.2	−42.9
Green	William Dyson	134	8.5	−0.6
Labour	Jon Hughes	112	7.1	−8.7
Turnout		1,573	49.3	−27.1
Liberal Democrats gain from Conservative				

* Represented the Wheldrake ward of City of York Council, 2003-2011

† Represented the Wheldrake ward of City of York Council, 2015-2019

== Changes 2019-2023 ==
=== Affiliation changes ===
- In October 2020, Fishergate councillor Dave Taylor resigned from the Green Party after being suspended over a comment about the death of footballer Jack Charlton, reducing the Liberal Democrat–Green coalition to a majority of one.

== See also ==
- City of York Council
- 2015 City of York Council election
