= 2011 City of York Council election =

City of York Council Election, 2011
← 2007	5 May 2011	2015 →

All 47 seats to City of York Council 24 seats needed for a majority
	First party	Second party	Third party
Leader	James Alexander	Ian Gillies	Andrew Waller
Party	Labour	Conservative	Liberal Democrats
Leader since	2010	2007	2008
Leader's seat	Holgate	Rural West	Westfield (defeated)
Last election	18	8	19
Seats before	18	7	20
Seats won	26	10	8
Seat change	▲8	▲2	▼11
Popular vote	55,563	32,958	39,077
Percentage	37.6%	22.3%	26.4%
Swing	▲10.7%	▼4.9%	▼5.5%
- Map of results of 2011 election
Leader of the Council before election
Andrew Waller
Liberal Democrats
Leader of the Council after election
James Alexander
Labour

Elections to City of York Council were held on Thursday 5 May 2011. The whole council was up for election. The vote took place alongside the 2011 United Kingdom Alternative Vote referendum.

The Labour Party gained overall control of the council from no overall control. Labour had previously won a majority of seats on the new York unitary council in 1995 and again in 1999. The Liberal Democrats had controlled the council outright since 2003 and led a minority administration since the 2007 election.

Andrew Waller, leader of the Liberal Democrats group and former leader of the council, was not reelected. Councillor Carol Runciman became leader of the Liberal Democrats group but stepped down in May 2013 and was replaced by Councillor Keith Aspden. Councillor Chris Steward became leader of the Conservative group in January 2014, succeeding Councillor Ian Gillies. Councillor James Alexander resigned as leader of the Labour Group and leader of the Council in November 2014, with Councillor Dafydd Williams taking on both of these roles.

In August 2012, Lynn Jeffries, a Labour councillor resigned the whip in protest at the council's cuts to social care, bringing the number of Independent Councillors to two; she subsequently joined the Liberal Democrat group. Labour Councillor Brian Watson became an independent councillor in May 2014 after being deselected in Guildhall ward. In September 2014, Councillor Helen Douglas resigned from the Labour group and joined the Conservatives leading to Labour losing overall control of the council. Councillors Ken King and David Scott resigned from the Labour group in October 2014. One seat was vacant following the death of councillor Lynn Jeffries in August 2014. The subsequent by-election held in October 2014 was won by Liberal Democrat former Council leader Andrew Waller. Conservative councillor Joe Watt left the Conservatives group in January 2015 after falling out with party leader Chris Steward.

== Election result ==
City of York Council election 2011
Party	Candidates						Votes		
Party	Stood	Elected	Gained	Unseated	Net	% of total	%	No.	Net %
Labour	47	26	8	0	+8	55.3%	37.6%	55,619	+10.7%
Conservative	33	10	3	1	+2	21.3%	22.3%	32,998	-4.9%
Liberal Democrats	47	8	1	12	-11	17.0%	26.4%	39,077	-5.5%
Green	42	2	0	0	0	4.3%	12.2%	17,982	+1.7%
Independent	1	1	1	0	+1	2.1%	0.4%	630	N/A
BNP	6	0	0	0	0	0%	0.7%	1,076	-1.9%
UKIP	1	0	0	0	0	0%	0.2%	263	N/A
TUSC	1	0	0	0	0	0%	0.1%	219	N/A

== Ward results ==
=== Acomb ward ===
Acomb
Party	Candidate	Votes	%	±%
Labour	David Anthony Horton *	1,571	31.1	6.2
Labour	Tracey Louise Simpson-Laing †	1,528	30.3	5.4
Conservative	Kirsten Ovenden	597	11.8	3.7
Conservative	Michael Tucker	569	11.3	1.1
Liberal Democrats	Reuban Alexander Mayne	221	4.4	−4.2
Green	John Norris	165	3.3	−2.4
Liberal Democrats	Samantha Jane Waudby	148	2.9	−4.7
Green	Chantal Purchase	147	2.9	2.9
BNP	Trevor Brown	103	2.9	−7.9
Turnout		5,049	42.4	−2.3
Labour hold				
Labour hold				

* Represented the Acomb ward of York City Council, 1986-1996, and the Acomb ward of City of York Council, 1995-2011

† Represented the Acomb ward of City of York Council, 1999-2011

=== Bishopthorpe ward ===
The parishes of Acaster Malbis and Bishopthorpe

Bishopthorpe
Party	Candidate	Votes	%	±%
Conservative	John Christopher Galvin *	908	50.0	0.8
Liberal Democrats	Carole Ann Green	488	26.9	−4.4
Labour	Benjamin Fox	327	18.0	5.5
Green	Jennifer Aitken	94	5.2	−1.9
Turnout		1,817	55.9	1.6
Conservative hold				

* Represented the Copmanthorpe ward of City of York Council, 1999-2003, and the Bishopthorpe ward of City of York Council, 2007-2011

=== Clifton ward ===
Clifton
Party	Candidate	Votes	%	±%
Labour	Helen Douglas *	1,655	18.5	2.5
Labour	Kenneth William King †	1,522	17.0	0.2
Labour	David Lee Scott ‡	1,395	15.6	1.0
Green	Ginnie Shaw	777	8.7	−0.1
Conservative	Tom McConnell	630	7.1	0.2
Liberal Democrats	Richard Ian Hill	608	6.8	0.3
Conservative	Matt Stephens	606	6.8	0.0
Green	Alan Derek Dunnett	493	5.5	5.5
Liberal Democrats	Derek Waudby	433	4.8	−1.0
Green	June Lesley Tranmer	408	4.6	4.6
Liberal Democrats	Davinia Anne Walsh	404	4.5	−1.9
Turnout		8,931	35.2	1.7
Labour hold				
Labour hold				
Labour hold				

* Represented the Clifton ward of City of York Council, 2007-2011

† Represented the Bootham ward of York City Council, 1982-1996, the Fishergate division of North Yorkshire County Council, 1985-1989, the Bootham ward of City of York Council, 1995-2003, and the Clifton ward of City of York Council, 2003-2011

‡ Represented the Clifton ward of City of York Council, 2003-2011

=== Derwent ward ===
The parishes of Dunnington, Holtby, and Kexby

Derwent
Party	Candidate	Votes	%	±%
Conservative	Jenny Brooks *	943	56.7	3.5
Liberal Democrats	Linda Maggs	562	33.8	1.3
Labour	Andrew John Collingwood	100	6.0	−5.0
Green	Alice Rowan	58	3.5	0.1
Turnout		1,663	60.0	6.5
Conservative hold				

* Represented the Derwent ward of City of York Council, 2007-2011

=== Dringhouses and Woodthorpe ward ===
Dringhouses and Woodthorpe
Party	Candidate	Votes	%	±%
Liberal Democrats	Ann Lorraine Reid *	1,509	11.7	−2.9
Labour	Gerard Paul Hodgson	1,508	11.7	4.2
Labour	Anna Jane Semlyen	1,504	11.7	3.2
Labour	Benjamin Eugene Tanguay	1,377	10.7	2.9
Liberal Democrats	Thomas Paul Holvey †	1,322	10.3	−2.8
Conservative	Adam Sinclair	1,309	10.2	−0.3
Conservative	Geoffrey John Widdows	1,165	9.1	−1.0
Conservative	Thom Wiseman	1,155	9.0	−0.7
Liberal Democrats	Tommy Spencer	1,065	8.3	−5.3
Green	Bronwen Gray	352	2.7	2.7
Green	John David Gray	303	2.4	−2.2
Green	Phoebe Grace Taylor	285	2.2	2.2
Turnout		12,854	51.0	5.8
Liberal Democrats hold				
Labour gain from Liberal Democrats				
Labour gain from Liberal Democrats				

* Represented the Foxwood ward of York City Council, 1990-1996, the Foxwood ward of City of York Council, 1995-2003, and the Dringhouses and Woodthorpe ward of City of York Council, 2003-2011

† Represented the Dringhouses and Woodthorpe ward of City of York Council, 2003-2011

=== Fishergate ward ===
Fishergate
Party	Candidate	Votes	%	±%
Green	Andy D'Agorne *	1,632	29.5	4.6
Green	Dave Taylor †	1,422	25.7	5.0
Labour	Kristina Anne Blenkharn	963	17.4	3.9
Labour	Daniel Nathan Sidley	765	13.8	2.8
UKIP	Judith Mary Morris	263	4.8	4.8
Liberal Democrats	Dean Knapper	257	4.7	1.7
Liberal Democrats	James Whiteside	222	4.0	1.2
Turnout		5,524	44.7	−0.2
Green hold				
Green hold				

* Represented the Fishergate ward of City of York Council, 2003-2011

† Represented the Fishergate ward of City of York Council, 2007-2011

=== Fulford ward ===
The parish of Fulford

Fulford
Party	Candidate	Votes	%	±%
Liberal Democrats	Keith James Richard Aspden *	593	48.8	4.4
Labour	Owain Guy Richard Gardner	374	30.8	7.3
Conservative	Andrew Simpson	181	14.9	1.4
Green	Candida Louise Spillard	68	5.6	−13.1
Turnout		1,216	55.8	4.2
Liberal Democrats hold				

* Represented the Fulford ward of City of York Council, 2003-2011

=== Guildhall ward ===
Guildhall
Party	Candidate	Votes	%	±%
Labour	Janet Mary Looker *	978	25.2	1.1
Labour	Brian Walter Joseph Edward Watson †	881	22.7	2.6
Conservative	Lynne Carty	537	13.8	1.2
Green	Denise Craghill	537	13.8	4.6
Green	Andreas Heinemeyer	326	8.4	0.8
Liberal Democrats	Ian Ernest Packington	313	8.1	2.5
Liberal Democrats	Lizzie Beardsley	310	8.0	2.6
Turnout		3,882	35.1	3.9
Labour hold				
Labour hold				

* Represented the Guildhall division of North Yorkshire County Council, 1985-1996, and the Guildhall ward of City of York Council, 1995-2011

† Represented the Acomb ward of York City Council, 1979-1984, the Guildhall ward of York City Council, 1988-1996, the Acomb division of North Yorkshire County Council, 1981-1989, and the Guildhall ward of City of York Council, 1995-2011

=== Haxby and Wigginton ward ===
The parishes of Haxby and Wigginton

Haxby and Wigginton
Party	Candidate	Votes	%	±%
Liberal Democrats	Paul Firth *	1,908	14.8	0.5
Conservative	Tony Richardson	1,729	13.4	0.4
Liberal Democrats	Ian Michael Cuthbertson †	1,616	12.5	−3.0
Conservative	Roy Watson-Smith	1,561	12.1	−0.5
Conservative	Adrian Clarke	1,532	11.9	0.1
Liberal Democrats	Jonathan Clifford Lancaster	1,364	10.6	−3.0
Labour	Mark David Baker	1,117	8.7	3.8
Labour	Patrick John Ola Evans	792	6.1	1.8
Labour	Jason Peter Rose	743	5.8	5.8
Green	Alan Philip Robertshaw	535	4.1	−0.7
Turnout		12,897	47.9	3.6
Liberal Democrats hold				
Liberal Democrats hold				
Conservative gain from Liberal Democrats				

* Represented the Haxby and Wigginton ward of City of York Council, 2007-2011

† Represented the Strensall ward of City of York Council, 2003-2007

=== Heslington ward ===
The parish of Heslington

Heslington
Party	Candidate	Votes	%	±%
Labour	David Toby Levene	670	45.4	23.2
Green	Caleb Wooding	449	30.4	7.0
Liberal Democrats	Christopher James Wiggin	358	24.2	−14.2
Turnout		1,477	37.8	0.6
Labour gain from Liberal Democrats				

=== Heworth ward ===
Heworth
Party	Candidate	Votes	%	±%
Labour	Barbara Boyce *	1,784	18.9	2.7
Labour	Ruth Elizabeth Potter †	1,702	18.1	2.0
Labour	Christina Mary Funnell ‡	1,684	17.9	2.6
Conservative	Jennifer Gambold	863	9.2	0.0
Conservative	Andrew Kay	853	9.0	−0.1
Green	Stuart Oxbrow	473	5.0	−2.9
Liberal Democrats	David Charles Barker	468	5.0	−0.4
Green	Stephen Walwyn	427	4.5	4.5
Liberal Democrats	Stelhan Ariyadasa-Sáez	347	3.7	−1.1
Liberal Democrats	Frances Ryan	324	3.4	−0.8
BNP	Jeff Kelly	285	3.0	−2.6
TUSC	Nigel Fenwick Smith	219	2.3	2.3
Turnout		9,429	36.4	−1.1
Labour hold				
Labour hold				
Labour hold				

* Represented the Heworth ward of City of York Council, 2009-2011

† Represented the Beckfield ward of City of York Council, 1999-2003, and the Heworth ward of City of York Council, 2003-2011

‡ Represented the Heworth ward of City of York Council, 2007-2011

=== Heworth Without ward ===
The parish of Heworth Without

Heworth Without
Party	Candidate	Votes	%	±%
Liberal Democrats	Nigel John Ayre *	951	51.0	15.4
Conservative	Laura Parrish	438	23.5	−14.2
Labour	Charmian Priscilla Walter	344	18.5	1.5
Green	Catherine Heinemeyer	80	4.3	−0.1
BNP	Cathy Smurthwaite	51	2.7	2.7
Turnout		1,864	58.5	3.4
Liberal Democrats gain from Conservative				

Election result compared with City of York Council election in May 2007.

* Represented the Heworth Without ward of City of York Council, 2007-2011

=== Holgate ward ===
Holgate
Party	Candidate	Votes	%	±%
Labour	James Martin Alexander *	2,211	18.9	5.7
Labour	Sonja Crisp *	1,991	17.0	4.8
Labour	Joseph Anthony John Riches	1,793	15.3	1.4
Liberal Democrats	Martin Richard Bartlett †	1,263	10.8	−0.5
Liberal Democrats	Simon Rodgers	1,193	10.2	−1.8
Liberal Democrats	Nick Love	1,143	9.8	−0.7
Conservative	Matthew Keighley	623	5.3	−0.7
Conservative	Petra Sobotkova	474	4.1	−1.6
Green	Rodney Bell	449	3.8	−2.6
Green	Owen Clayton	360	3.1	3.1
BNP	Lisa Kelly	195	1.7	−2.7
Turnout		11,695	44.4	1.2
Labour hold				
Labour hold				
Labour hold				

* Represented the Holgate ward of City of York Council, 2007-2011

† Represented the Holgate ward of City of York Council, 2003-2007

=== Hull Road ward ===
Hull Road
Party	Candidate	Votes	%	±%
Labour	Neil Andrew Barnes	1,172	26.5	8.2
Labour	Fiona Theresa Fitzpatrick	1,046	23.7	5.8
Conservative	Sam Croft	626	14.2	−0.2
Liberal Democrats	Josh Allen	460	10.4	1.2
Green	John Scobell Cossham	397	9.0	1.4
Green	Luke Capps	370	8.4	1.1
Liberal Democrats	Jonathan Robert Pannell	351	7.9	0.5
Turnout		4,422	35.1	−0.7
Labour hold				
Labour hold				

=== Huntington and New Earswick ward ===
The parishes of Huntington and New Earswick

Huntington and New Earswick
Party	Candidate	Votes	%	±%
Liberal Democrats	Keith Ian Hyman *	2,015	19.5	0.8
Liberal Democrats	Keith Orrell *	1,910	18.5	−0.1
Liberal Democrats	Carol Elizabeth Runciman †	1,863	18.0	0.4
Labour	Margaret Wells	1,254	12.1	5.2
Labour	Robert Neil Purrington	1,167	11.3	4.8
Labour	Thomas James Williams	972	9.4	9.4
Green	Clive Woolley	546	5.3	−1.6
Green	Roxanne Kovacs	350	3.4	3.4
BNP	Jeffrey Kelly	273	2.6	2.6
Turnout		10,350	40.3	3.1
Liberal Democrats hold				
Liberal Democrats hold				
Liberal Democrats hold				

* Represented the Huntington and New Earswick ward of City of York Council, 2003-2011

† Represented the Huntington and New Earswick ward of City of York Council, 1999-2011

=== Micklegate ward ===
Micklegate
Party	Candidate	Votes	%	±%
Labour	Julie Christine Gunnell *	2,049	16.7	3.4
Labour	Sandy Fraser †	1,977	16.1	2.7
Labour	David Martin Merrett ‡	1,873	15.3	1.7
Green	Andrew David Chase	1,622	13.2	0.5
Green	Caroline Leonora Boreham	1,094	8.9	−0.9
Green	Alan Peter Swain	854	7.0	−4.4
Conservative	Marc Allinson	828	6.7	0.5
Conservative	Bob Schofield	679	5.5	−0.2
Liberal Democrats	Ashley Robert Mason	611	5.0	1.5
Liberal Democrats	Matthew Jonathan Reid	355	2.9	0.2
Liberal Democrats	Susan Shaun Willer	325	2.6	0.2
Turnout		12,267	47.1	4.3
Labour hold				
Labour hold				
Labour hold				

* Represented the Micklegate ward of City of York Council, 2007-2011
† Represented the Micklegate ward of City of York Council, 2003-2011
‡ Represented the Bishophill ward of York City Council, 1982-1996, the Bishophill ward of City of York Council, 1995-2003, and the Micklegate ward of City of York Council, 2003-2011

=== Osbaldwick ward ===
The parishes of Murton and Osbaldwick

Osbaldwick
Party	Candidate	Votes	%	±%
Independent	Mark Warters	630	46.2	46.2
Liberal Democrats	Jonathan Peter Morley *	250	18.3	−22.4
Labour	Thomas Samuel Corker	231	16.9	−2.8
Conservative	Robin Nicholas Dickson †	216	15.8	−12.5
Green	Spinoza Pitman	38	2.8	−8.6
Turnout		1,365	51.1	8.6
Independent gain from Liberal Democrats				

* Represented the Osbaldwick / Heworth division of North Yorkshire County Council, 1985-1996, and the Osbaldwick ward of City of York Council, 1999-2011

† Represented the Fishergate division of North Yorkshire County Council, 1989-1993

=== Rural West York ward ===
The parishes of Askham Bryan, Askham Richard, Copmanthorpe, Hessay, Nether Poppleton, Rufforth with Knapton, and Upper Poppleton

Rural West York
Party	Candidate	Votes	%	±%
Conservative	Ian Gillies *	2,298	18.8	1.8
Conservative	Paul Healey *	1,889	15.5	0.6
Conservative	Chris Steward	1,690	13.8	−0.4
Liberal Democrats	Glen Anthony Bradley †	1,232	10.1	−3.9
Liberal Democrats	Quentin MacDonald ‡	1,027	8.4	−4.7
Liberal Democrats	Richard Charles Alfred Brown	1,011	8.3	−4.0
Labour	Jacob Peter Lister	855	7.0	2.1
Labour	William Joseph Owen	686	5.6	1.1
Labour	Iain Alexander Simpson-Laing	669	5.5	5.5
Green	Gillian Mary Cossham	298	2.4	−2.5
Green	Eve Halliday	298	2.4	2.4
Green	Charles Everett	253	2.1	2.1
Turnout		12,206	52.9	2.3
Conservative hold				
Conservative hold				
Conservative hold				

* Represented the Rural West York ward of City of York Council, 2007-2011

† Represented the Rural West York ward of City of York Council, 2003-2007

‡ Represented the Upper Poppleton ward of City of York Council, 1995-2003, and the Rural West York ward of City of York Council, 2003-2007

=== Skelton, Rawcliffe, and Clifton Without ward ===
The parishes of Clifton Without, Rawcliffe, and Skelton

Skelton, Rawcliffe, and Clifton Without
Party	Candidate	Votes	%	±%
Labour	Linsay Dawn Cunningham-Cross	1,498	12.4	4.7
Labour	Neil Edward McIlveen	1,456	12.1	5.1
Conservative	Joe Watt *	1,435	11.9	−0.8
Labour	Tracy Jane White	1,405	11.6	4.9
Conservative	Ben Carty	1,316	10.9	−0.9
Conservative	Stuart Rawlings	1,268	10.5	2.1
Liberal Democrats	Richard Ceri Shrimpton	1,088	9.0	−4.3
Liberal Democrats	Neil John Gowans	848	7.0	−5.2
Liberal Democrats	Donald Smith	764	6.3	−4.5
Green	Nathan Adams	300	2.5	−2.5
Green	David Williams	277	2.3	2.3
Green	Joel Hellewell	242	2.0	2.0
BNP	Terry Chafer	169	1.4	−2.8
Turnout		12,066	42.7	3.8
Labour gain from Liberal Democrats				
Labour gain from Liberal Democrats				
Conservative hold				

* Represented the Skelton, Rawcliffe, and Clifton Without ward of City of York Council, 2007-2011

=== Strensall ward ===
The parishes of Earswick, Stockton-on-the-Forest, and Strensall with Towthorpe

Strensall
Party	Candidate	Votes	%	±%
Conservative	Paul Doughty	1,294	26.7	9.5
Conservative	Sian Wiseman *	1,255	25.9	3.6
Liberal Democrats	Madeleine Kirk †	792	16.3	−10.5
Labour	Alexander Patrick Forbes	499	10.3	4.6
Liberal Democrats	Pat Hearn	378	7.8	−14.2
Labour	Graham Keith Meiklejohn	348	7.2	7.2
Green	Matthew Durrant	151	3.1	−2.9
Green	Matthew Whitfield	131	2.7	2.7
Turnout		4,848	42.2	3.3
Conservative hold				
Conservative gain from Liberal Democrats				

* Represented the Strensall ward of City of York Council, 2007-2011

† Represented the Skelton ward of Ryedale District Council, 1991-1996, and the Strensall ward of City of York Council, 1996-2011

=== Westfield ward ===
Westfield
Party	Candidate	Votes	%	±%
Labour	Stephen Andrew Burton	1,767	17.1	7.5
Labour	Lynn Jeffries	1,642	15.9	6.5
Labour	Dafydd Emlyn Williams	1,540	14.9	6.7
Liberal Democrats	Andrew Michael Waller *	1,401	13.6	−1.9
Liberal Democrats	Stephen Fred Galloway †	1,397	13.5	−2.8
Liberal Democrats	Mark Kelsall Waudby ‡	1,152	11.2	−5.2
Conservative	Andrew Brooks	561	5.4	0.5
Green	Alison Webb	343	3.3	−1.4
Green	Jonathan Radley Tyler	260	2.5	2.5
Green	Daniella Webb	253	2.5	2.5
Turnout		10,316	38.0	3.0
Labour gain from Liberal Democrats				
Labour gain from Liberal Democrats				
Labour gain from Liberal Democrats				

* Represented the Westfield ward of York City Council, 1994-1996, and the Westfield ward of City of York Council, 1999-2011

† Represented the Westfield ward of York City Council, 1979-1996, the Westfield division of North Yorkshire County Council, 1993-1996, and the Westfield ward of City of York Council, 1995-2011

‡ Represented the Rawcliffe and Skelton ward of City of York Council, 1999-2003, and the Skelton, Rawcliffe, and Clifton Without ward of City of York Council, 2003-2007

=== Wheldrake ward ===
The parishes of Deighton, Elvington, Naburn, and Wheldrake

Wheldrake
Party	Candidate	Votes	%	±%
Conservative	George Barton	970	56.2	17.2
Liberal Democrats	Christian Maurice Vassie *	457	26.5	−21.4
Labour	Susan Elizabeth Watson	234	13.6	4.5
Green	William Dyson	65	3.8	−0.4
Turnout		1,726	53.6	2.5
Conservative gain from Liberal Democrats				

* Represented the Wheldrake ward of City of York Council, 2003-2011
