= Rebecca Newman =

English singer and songwriter (born 1981)

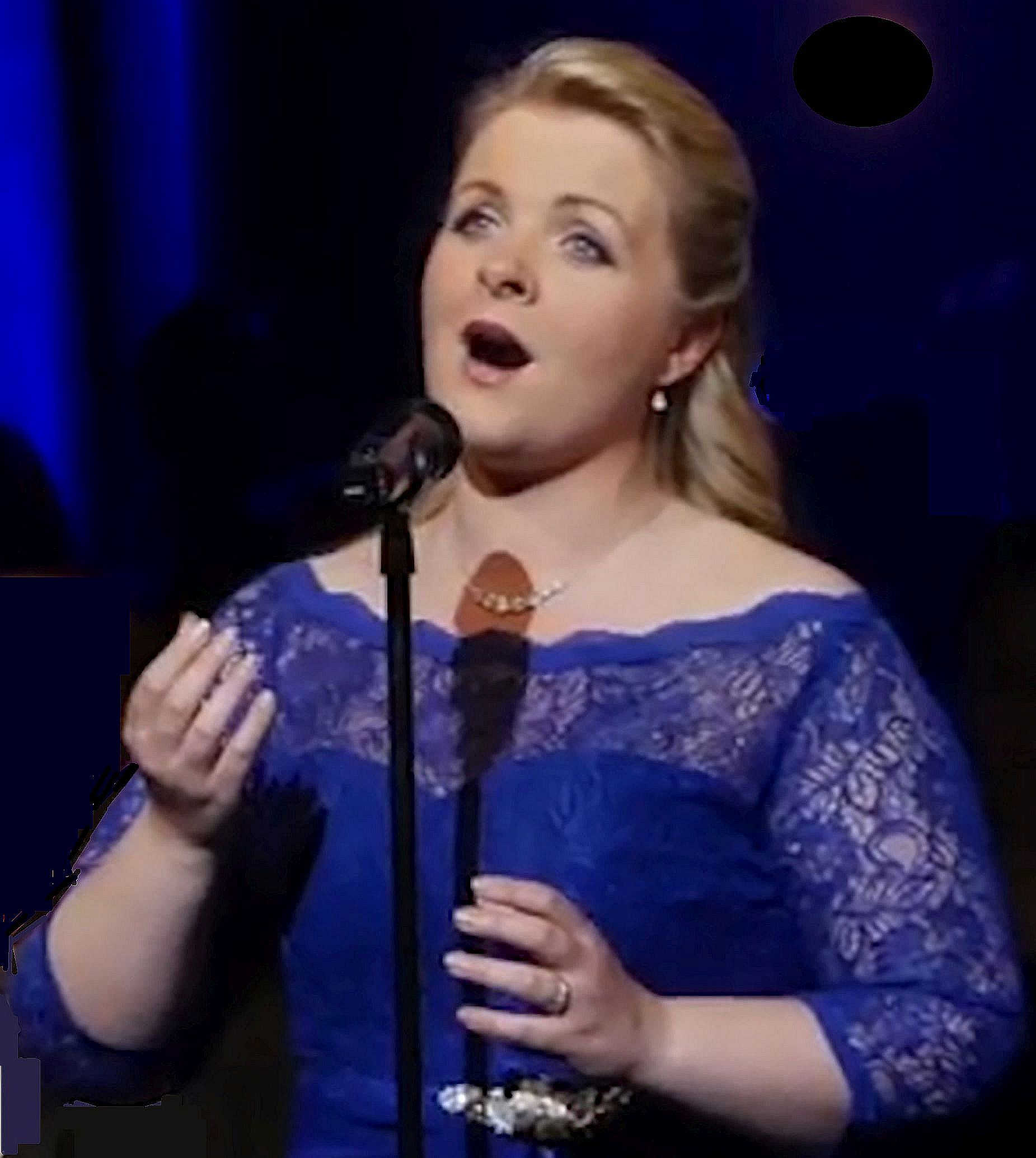

Background information
- Born: 1981 (age 44–45)
- Origin: Exmouth, Devon, England
- Genres: Classical-crossover, classical, musicals, folk
- Instrument: Voice (Lyric soprano)
- Years active: 2005–present
- Label: Rambling Rose Records
- Website: rebeccanewman.co.uk

Rebecca Newman (born 1981) is an English soprano singer and songwriter. She came to prominence in the UK music scene in September 2014 when her debut chart album Dare to Dream went to number 1 in the Official UK Classical Artists Album Chart.

Dubbed 'The People's Soprano' by her fans, colleagues and the media, and following several years as an operatic street performer, she has sung with Aled Jones, Russell Watson, Alfie Boe, Blake, and Joseph Calleja and appeared on UK national television and radio.

== Early life ==
Newman was born and raised in Exmouth, Devon, where she remained until she was 21. She began singing at the age of 13 and twice during her teenage years won a place with the National Youth Music Theatre. In 2002 she moved to London to pursue a career in business, and then moved to York, North Yorkshire in 2004, to read Philosophy, Politics and Economics at the University of York, graduating in 2007. During her time there she began busking and accepting professional engagements. She has remained resident in York.

== Music career ==
=== Career beginnings ===
Newman released her first CD album in September 2005, which she recorded on location at the University of York's Jack Lyons Concert Hall. She went on to release four more studio albums selling over 15,000 copies before her debut chart-eligible album release in 2014. She also performed at many prestigious venues including Glasgow Royal Concert Hall, The Royal Hall in Harrogate and Headingley Stadium. In 2013, Newman performed with Aled Jones at Truro Cathedral and Russell Watson at the Party in the Park in Burton Agnes, and performed the national anthems live on international television for three Rugby League World Cup matches. Newman also co-wrote and recorded the official song for the Rugby League World Cup Dance Project, Pass It On. In November 2013, she released a charity single version of Wonderful Dream, originally released by the late singer Melanie Thornton. Newman built up a loyal following of supporters, who dub themselves The Newmaneers.

=== Dare to Dream 2014–15 ===
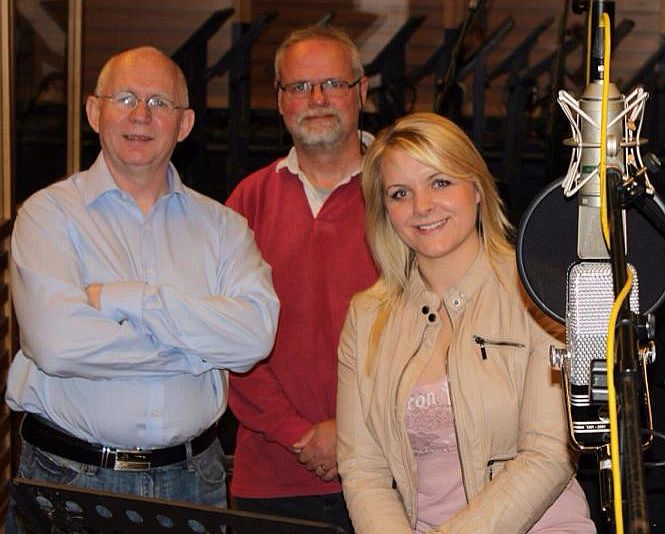
Newman with Paul Bateman and James Fitzpatrick in Prague

In early 2013 she engaged the services of the City of Prague Philharmonic Orchestra, conductor and arranger Paul Bateman, orchestral producer James Fitzpatrick and producer Gareth Ellis Williams to help create her new album.

The title track Dare to Dream was co-written by Newman, Chris Nicolaides and Mike Brayn. The album was released on her own record label, Rambling Rose Records, on 14 September 2014 and it went straight to number one in the Official UK Classical Artists Albums Chart. It received rave reviews and quickly sold out online and in HMV stores Following the chart success, Newman embarked on a fifty-plus date tour with Russell Watson, as his special guest, performing to over 50,000 people from March to July 2015, followed by a duet with tenor Alfie Boe during the final concert of his summer tour.

== Television and radio ==
Since 2005, Newman has appeared extensively on BBC regional radio and commercial radio stations, among them BBC Radio Bristol and BBC Radio Norfolk. She first appeared on BBC One's Songs of Praise in November 2014, performing "The Prayer" with the vocal group Blake, and again in May 2015 singing Abide with Me as a solo performance in Manchester Cathedral. The broadcast of the final round of the BBC Radio 2 Young Chorister of the Year competition in St Paul's Cathedral featured the special guests, Newman with Blake, in live performance, and on the Radio 2 Weekend Wogan programme she was interviewed by Terry Wogan and performed live on air.

== Charity ==
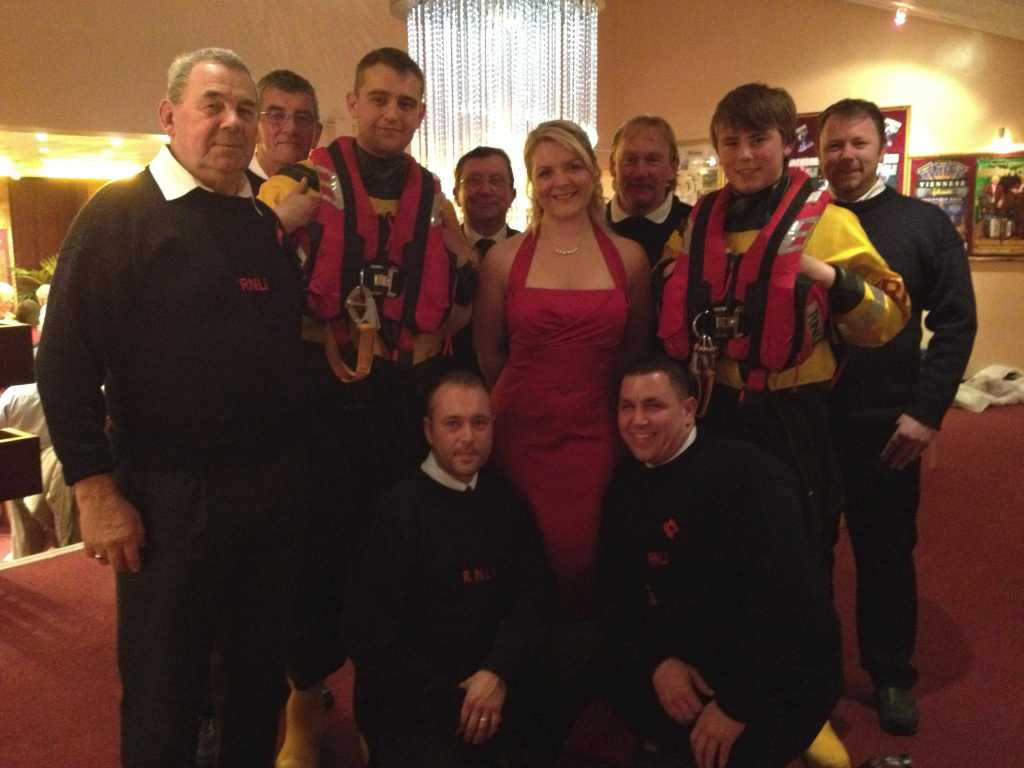
Newman with RNLI lifeboatmen

Newman has worked extensively with charities including directly fundraising for ChildLine and for the Royal National Lifeboat Institution, whose Coast to Coast tour in 2012 earned her the RNLI Award for Outstanding Achievement. She has recently become the patron for Socks and Chocs, a West Midlands based homeless outreach charity.
She has performed for fundraising events for many charities and community organisations, including The Royal British Legion. and Tumaini Jipya. In June 2017 she joined Joseph Calleja in a gala charity evening at the Victoria and Albert Museum in support of the Inle Trust.

== Politics ==
In 2019 Newman, standing under her married name of Fewtrell, stood for the Labour Party in the 2019 City of York Council election in the Rawcliffe and Clifton Without Ward, however she was unsuccessful.

== Discography ==
=== Albums ===
2005: Music Box
2008: Cantare
2009: Memory
2010: O Holy Night
2011: Fields of Gold
2014: Dare to Dream (UK Classical Artist Albums Chart No.1)

=== Singles ===
2012: "Il Mio Cuore Va"
2013: "Pass It On"
2013: "Heroes to the World"
2013: "Holidays Are Coming (Wonderful Dream)"
2014: "Heroes to the World – The People's Anthem"
