= Ulrike Kramm =

German chemist and academic

- Education: TU Berlin; Westsächsische Hochschule Zwickau
- Scientific career
- Workplaces: TU Darmstadt; Helmholtz-Zentrum Berlin; Brandenburg University of Technology; INRS-EMT
- Thesis: Die strukturelle Einbindung des Eisens in pyrolysierten Eisenporphyrin-Elektrokatalysatoren eine 57Fe mößbauerspektroskopische Studie (2009)

Ulrike I. Kramm is a German chemistry professor at Technische Universität Darmstadt. Her research considers the development and characterisation of metal catalysts for fuel cells, CO_{2} conversion and solar fuels.

== Early life and education ==
Kramm was a student at Westsächsische Hochschule Zwickau. Her undergraduate thesis involved nitrogen doped titania for photoelectrocatalytic water splitting, and she performed her experiments at the Hahn-Meitner-Institute. She joined Technische Universität Berlin for doctoral research, where she started to research pyrolysed iron-porphyrin electrocatalysts. She was a postdoctoral researcher at Helmholtz-Zentrum Berlin, BTU Cottbus and INRS-EMT.

== Research and career ==
Kramm leads a research group at Technische Universität Darmstadt that focuses on catalysis. She works to design new catalytic materials that can improve the energy efficiency of preparation processes. She has focussed on M-N-C catalysts, specifically, Fe-N-C. Fe-N-C catalysts are almost as active as platinum catalysts, but the iron-based catalysts are not stable enough to use in the automotive industry.

Kramm also works on Mössbauer spectroscopy, providing detailed elemental information about materials, including the chemical environment of certain nuclei.

== Awards and honours ==
- 2019 Merck & Co. Curious Mind Researcher Award
- 2020 German Research Foundation Heinz Maier-Leibnitz Prize

== Selected publications ==
- Frédéric Jaouen; Juan Herranz; Michel Lefèvre; et al. (2009). "Cross-laboratory experimental study of non-noble-metal electrocatalysts for the oxygen reduction reaction". ACS Applied Materials & Interfaces. 1 (8): 1623–1639. doi:10.1021/am900219g. PMID 20355776. Wikidata Q57715363.
- Ulrike I Kramm; Juan Herranz; Nicholas Larouche; et al. (2012). "Structure of the catalytic sites in Fe/N/C-catalysts for O2-reduction in PEM fuel cells". Physical Chemistry Chemical Physics. 14 (33): 11673–11688. doi:10.1039/c2cp41957b. PMC 3429934. PMID 22824866. Wikidata Q36196126.
- Nastaran Ranjbar Sahraie; Ulrike I Kramm; Julian Steinberg; Yuanjian Zhang; Arne Thomas; Tobias Reier; Jens-Peter Paraknowitsch; Peter Strasser (2015). "Quantifying the density and utilization of active sites in non-precious metal oxygen electroreduction catalysts". Nature Communications. 6 (1): 8618. Bibcode:2015NatCo...6.8618S. doi:10.1038/ncomms9618. PMC 4639811. PMID 26486465. Wikidata Q42616047.
