= 2015 City of York Council election =

City of York Council Election, 2015
- 7 May 2015

All 47 seats to City of York Council 24 seats needed for a majority
	First party	Second party	Third party
Leader	Dafydd Williams	Chris Steward	Keith Aspden
Party	Labour	Conservative	Liberal Democrats
Leader since	11 December 2014	19 December 2013	11 May 2013
Leader's seat	Heworth	Rural West York	Fulford and Heslington
Last election	26	10	8
Seats before	21	10	9
Seats won	15	14	12
Seat change	▼11	▲4	▲4
Popular vote	59,164	65,507	55,331
Percentage	25.6%	28.3%	23.9%
Swing	▼12.0%	▲6.0%	▼2.5%
- Map of results of 2015 election
Leader of the Council before election
Dafydd Williams
Labour
Leader of the Council after election
Chris Steward
Conservative

The 2015 City of York Council election took place on 7 May 2015 to elect members of City of York Council in England. The whole council was up for election. Turnout was substantially up across the city due to the election being held on the same day as the general election and other local elections in England.

Since the previous election in 2011 a review of ward boundaries had affected some wards, although the total number of councillors remained at 47. The following wards remained unchanged from 2011: Acomb, Bishopthorpe, Dringhouses and Woodthorpe, Haxby and Wigginton, Holgate, Huntington and New Earswick, Micklegate, Strensall, Westfield and Wheldrake. All other wards saw boundary changes and a new ward, Copmanthorpe, was created from the former Rural West York Ward.

The election saw heavy losses for the ruling Labour Party, which had won overall control of the council in 2011, losing more than 40% of the 26 seats won at the previous election. Several senior Labour councillors were defeated including the party's deputy leader Tracey Simpson-Laing and Cabinet members Dave Merrett and Linsay Cunningham. The Conservatives, Liberal Democrats and Greens all made gains and two Independent councillors were also elected. A record number of new councillors were elected, almost half of the entire Council, with the York Press reporting that "of the 47 seats contested, 25 were won by candidates with council experience while 22 were won by debutants." Following talks between the political groups after the election, the Conservatives and Liberal Democrats agreed to run the Council as a joint administration.

== Election result ==
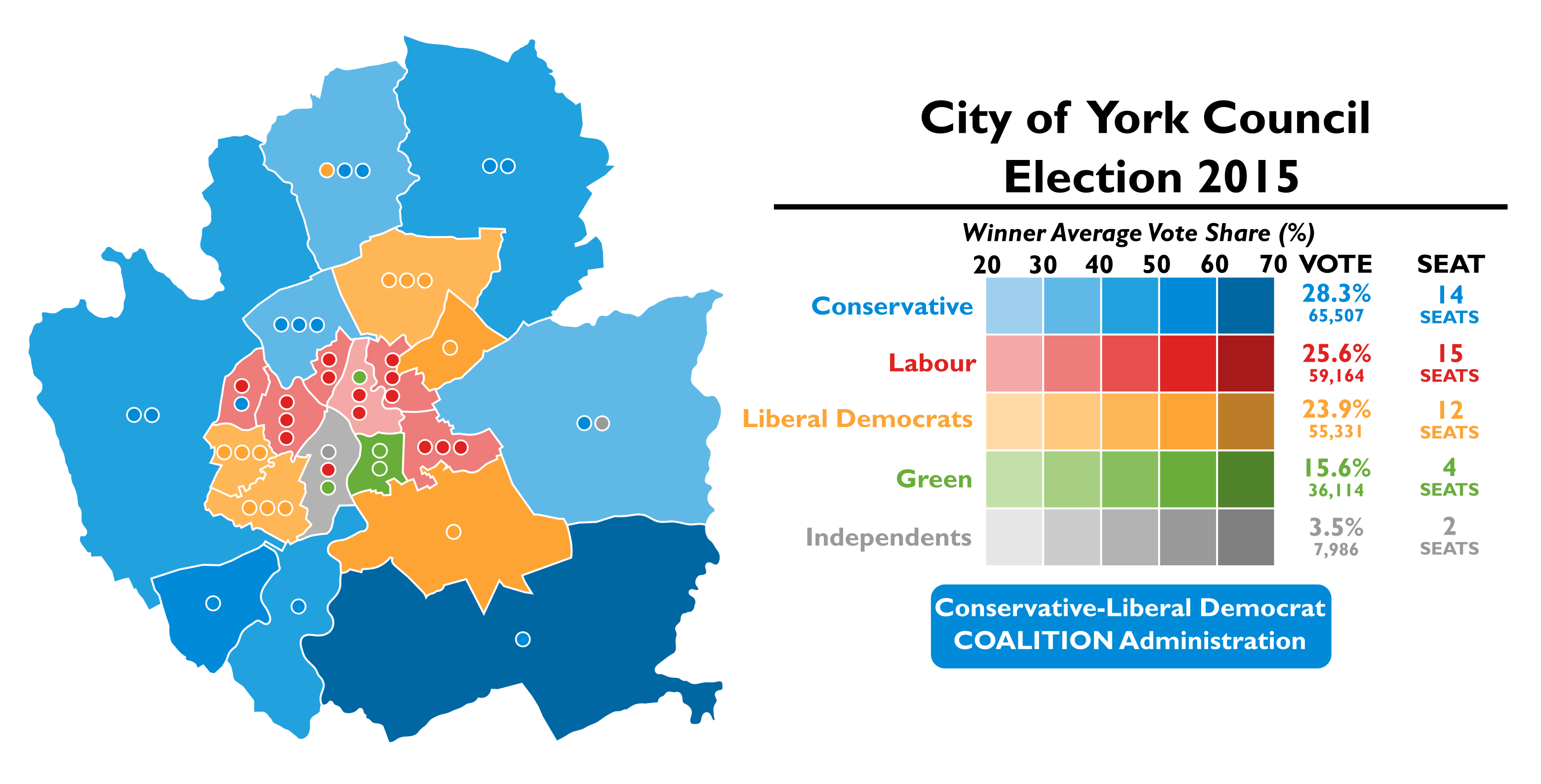
Results Map of the 2015 City of York Council Election.

City of York Council election 2015
Party	Candidates						Votes		
Party	Stood	Elected	Gained	Unseated	Net	% of total	%	No.	Net %
Labour	47	15	n/a	n/a	-11	31.9%	25.6%	59,164	-12.0%
Conservative	47	14	n/a	n/a	+4	29.8%	28.3%	65,507	+6.0%
Liberal Democrats	47	12	n/a	n/a	+4	25.5%	23.9%	55,331	-2.5%
Green	47	4	n/a	n/a	+2	8.5%	15.6%	36,114	+3.4%
Independent	10	2	n/a	n/a	+1	4.3%	3.5%	7,986	+3.0%
UKIP	9	0	n/a	n/a	0	0%	2.3%	5,432	+2.2%
TUSC	8	0	n/a	n/a	0	0%	0.7%	1,711	+0.6%

There were boundary changes in 13 wards, which elected 28 city councillors. There were no boundary changes in 8 wards, which elected 19 city councillors.

== Ward results ==
=== Acomb ward ===
Acomb
Party	Candidate	Votes	%
Labour	Stuart James Barnes	1,462	32.3
Conservative	Keith Robert Myers	1,440	31.9
Labour	Tracey Louise Simpson-Laing *	1,292	28.6
Conservative	Jason Brown	1,286	28.5
UKIP	Vincent Scaum	679	15.0
Liberal Democrats	Reuban Alexander Mayne	636	14.1
Green	Alice Rowan	506	11.2
Liberal Democrats	John Thomas Ballantine	462	10.2
Green	Andy Wilson	382	8.5
Turnout		4,552	67.3
Labour win (new seat)			
Conservative win (new seat)			

* Represented the Acomb ward of City of York Council, 1999-2015

=== Bishopthorpe ward ===
The parishes of Acaster Malbis and Bishopthorpe

Bishopthorpe
Party	Candidate	Votes	%	±%
Conservative	John Christopher Galvin *	1,274	49.3	−0.7
Independent	Carole Ann Green	606	23.4	23.4
Labour	Bob Scrase †	407	15.7	−2.3
Green	David Williams	154	6.0	0.8
Liberal Democrats	Daniel Yameen Prakash Khan	144	5.6	−21.3
Turnout		2,585	77.5	21.6
Conservative hold				

There were no boundary changes to Bishopthorpe ward.

* Represented the Copmanthorpe ward of City of York Council, 1999-2003, and the Bishopthorpe ward of City of York Council, 2007-2015

† Represented the Holgate ward of York City Council, 1992-1996, and the Holgate ward of City of York Council, 1995-2003

=== Clifton ward ===
Clifton
Party	Candidate	Votes	%
Labour	Danny Myers	1,554	37.6
Labour	Margaret Wells	1,175	28.4
Conservative	Bill Gambold	826	20.0
Conservative	Jan Powell	705	17.0
Green	Candy Spillard	658	15.9
Green	John Walford	584	14.1
Liberal Democrats	Tobie James Abel	550	13.3
Independent	Ken King *	479	11.6
UKIP	David Scullion	465	11.2
Liberal Democrats	Derek Wann	302	7.3
Independent	David Lee Scott †	279	6.7
TUSC	Martin Readle	131	3.2
Turnout		4,185	60.4
Labour win (new seat)			
Labour win (new seat)			

* Represented the Bootham ward of York City Council, 1982-1996, the Fishergate division of North Yorkshire County Council, 1985-1989, the Bootham ward of City of York Council, 1995-2003, and the Clifton ward of City of York Council, 2003-2015

† Represented the Clifton ward of City of York Council, 2003-2015

=== Copmanthorpe ward ===
The parish of Copmanthorpe

Copmanthorpe
Party	Candidate	Votes	%
Conservative	David Terry Carr	1,339	50.5
Liberal Democrats	Richard Charles Alfred Brown	689	26.0
Labour	David Anthony Horton *	442	16.7
Green	Jennifer Aitken	184	6.9
Turnout		2,654	75.7
Conservative win (new seat)			

* Represented the Acomb ward of York City Council, 1986-1996, and the Acomb ward of City of York Council, 1995-2015

=== Dringhouses and Woodthorpe ward ===
Dringhouses and Woodthorpe
Party	Candidate	Votes	%	±%
Liberal Democrats	Ann Lorraine Reid *	3,104	46.8	
Liberal Democrats	Stephen Daniel Fenton	2,649	40.0	
Liberal Democrats	Ashley Robert Mason	2,368	35.7	
Conservative	Daniel James Donnor	1,728	26.1	
Conservative	Matthew Litten	1,569	23.7	
Conservative	Matt Freckelton	1,461	22.0	
Labour	Gerard Paul Hodgson †	1,238	18.7	
Labour	Rita Milne	1,159	17.5	
Labour	William Joseph Owen	1,022	15.4	
UKIP	Paul Abbott	792	11.9	
Green	Bronwen Gray	635	9.6	
Green	John Gray	512	7.7	
Green	Caleb John Wooding	459	6.9	
Turnout		6,709	72.4	21.4
Liberal Democrats hold				
Liberal Democrats gain from Labour				
Liberal Democrats gain from Labour				

There were no boundary changes to Dringhouses and Woodthorpe ward.

* Represented the Foxwood ward of York City Council, 1990-1996, the Foxwood ward of City of York Council, 1995-2003, and the Dringhouses and Woodthorpe ward of City of York Council, 2003-2015

† Represented the Dringhouses and Woodthorpe ward of City of York Council, 2011-2015

=== Fishergate ward ===
Fishergate
Party	Candidate	Votes	%
Green	Andy D'Agorne *	2,241	60.6
Green	Dave Taylor †	1,997	54.0
Labour	George Harold Norman	974	26.3
Labour	Susan Elizabeth Watson	785	21.2
Conservative	Hugo Graham	587	15.9
Conservative	Margaret Redfern	573	15.5
UKIP	Thomas Turton	315	8.5
Liberal Democrats	Charlie Kingsbury	275	7.4
Liberal Democrats	Shawn Richard Imeson	154	4.2
TUSC	Jamie Anthony Chatfield	103	2.8
Turnout		3,743	66.2
Green win (new seat)			
Green win (new seat)			

* Represented the Fishergate ward of City of York Council, 2003-2015

† Represented the Fishergate ward of City of York Council, 2007-2015

=== Fulford and Heslington ward ===
The parish of Fulford and part of the parish of Heslington

Fulford and Heslington
Party	Candidate	Votes	%
Liberal Democrats	Keith Richard James Aspden *	1,188	55.6
Conservative	Calum James Stewart	437	20.5
Labour	Geoff Fletcher	355	16.6
Green	Tess McMahon	156	7.3
Turnout		2,136	70.6
Liberal Democrats win (new seat)			

* Represented the Fulford ward of City of York Council, 2003-2015

=== Guildhall ward ===
Guildhall
Party	Candidate	Votes	%
Green	Denise Craghill	1,895	34.8
Labour	James Alexander Flinders	1,625	29.9
Labour	Janet Mary Looker *	1,621	29.8
Labour	Kate Pilling	1,407	25.9
Green	Andy Law	1,253	23.0
Conservative	Jan Keenan	1,209	22.2
Conservative	Jack Robinson	1,112	20.4
Green	June Lesley Tranmer	1,060	19.5
Conservative	Janette Robinson	984	18.1
Liberal Democrats	Nick Love	672	12.3
UKIP	John Brittlebank	520	9.6
Liberal Democrats	Michael Joseph Green	511	9.4
Independent	Brian Walter Joseph Edward Watson †	416	7.6
Independent	Gordon Campbell-Thomas	386	7.1
Liberal Democrats	Derek Waudby	254	4.7
TUSC	Andrew Dickenson	214	3.9
Turnout		5,503	53.8
Green win (new seat)			
Labour win (new seat)			
Labour win (new seat)			

* Represented the Guildhall division of North Yorkshire County Council, 1985-1996, and the Guildhall ward of City of York Council, 1995-2015

† Represented the Acomb ward of York City Council, 1979-1984, the Guildhall ward of York City Council, 1988-1996, the Acomb division of North Yorkshire County Council, 1981-1989, and the Guildhall ward of City of York Council, 1995-2015

=== Haxby and Wigginton ward ===
The parishes of Haxby and Wigginton

Haxby and Wigginton
Party	Candidate	Votes	%	±%
Liberal Democrats	Ian Michael Cuthbertson *	2,707	37.5	
Conservative	Tony Richardson †	2,640	36.5	
Conservative	John Edwin Gates	2,582	35.7	
Liberal Democrats	Martin Lewis Crosby	2,432	33.7	
Conservative	Roy Watson-Smith	2,395	33.1	
Liberal Democrats	Sue Willer	2,113	29.2	
Labour	Ian Craven	1,129	15.6	
Labour	Stephen Alexander Johnstone	963	13.3	
Labour	Denise Wendy Bowgett ‡	926	12.8	
Green	Alan Philip Robertshaw	606	8.4	
Independent	Neil Andrew Charles Wyatt	420	5.8	
Green	Paul Donovan	414	5.7	
Green	Henry David Hale	344	4.8	
Turnout		7,309	71.7	23.8
Liberal Democrats hold				
Conservative hold				
Conservative gain from Liberal Democrats				

There were no boundary changes to Haxby and Wigginton ward.

* Represented the Strensall ward of City of York Council, 2003-2007, and the Haxby and Wigginton ward of City of York Council, 2011-2015

† Represented the Haxby and Wigginton ward of City of York Council, 2011-2015

‡ Represented the Holgate ward of City of York Council, 2007-2011

=== Heworth ward ===
Heworth
Party	Candidate	Votes	%
Labour	Barbara Boyce *	2,166	35.8
Labour	Christina Mary Funnell †	2,101	34.8
Labour	Dafydd Emlyn Williams ‡	2,001	33.1
Conservative	Jennifer Gambold	1,448	24.0
Conservative	Teri Rhodes	1,377	22.8
Green	Jessica Grace Dixon	1,283	21.2
Liberal Democrats	Matthew John Smithson	1,174	19.4
Green	Nicola Clare Normandale	1,047	17.3
Green	Ginevra Gordon	907	15.0
UKIP	Kenneth Guest	907	15.0
Liberal Democrats	Ian Ernest Packington	696	11.5
Liberal Democrats	Benedict Samuel Rich	480	7.9
TUSC	Nigel Fenwick Smith	385	6.4
Conservative	Terry Smith	276	4.6
Turnout		6,123	61.3
Labour win (new seat)			
Labour win (new seat)			
Labour win (new seat)			

* Represented the Heworth ward of City of York Council, 2009-2015

† Represented the Heworth ward of City of York Council, 2007-2015

‡ Represented the Westfield ward of City of York Council, 2011-2015

=== Heworth Without ward ===
The parish of Heworth Without

Heworth Without
Party	Candidate	Votes	%
Liberal Democrats	Nigel John Ayre *	1,420	52.4
Conservative	Andrew George Whitney	603	22.3
Labour	Simon Mark Winch	374	13.8
UKIP	Fred Bowron	163	6.0
Green	Doug Doherty	150	5.5
Turnout		2,710	75.9
Liberal Democrats win (new seat)			

* Represented the Heworth Without ward of City of York Council, 2007-2015

=== Holgate ward ===
Holgate
Party	Candidate	Votes	%
Labour	Sonja Crisp *	2,183	33.9
Labour	Mary Cannon	2,037	31.7
Labour	Fiona Derbyshire	1,789	27.8
Conservative	Adam Daniel Cook	1,516	23.6
Green	Pam Hanley	1,273	19.8
Conservative	Kirston Ovenden	1,221	19.0
Liberal Democrats	Robert Moray Adamson	1,018	15.8
Conservative	Petra Sobotkova	957	14.9
Green	Andreas Heinemeyer	954	14.8
UKIP	Judith Mary Morris	924	14.4
Green	Pete Harris	876	13.6
Liberal Democrats	Matthew Jonathan Reid	849	13.2
Liberal Democrats	Jonathan Peter Morely	812	12.6
Independent	Christian Maurice Vassie †	729	11.3
TUSC	Gwen Vardigans	326	5.1
Turnout		6,470	65.7
Labour win (new seat)			
Labour win (new seat)			
Labour win (new seat)			

* Represented the Holgate ward of City of York Council, 2007-2015

† Represented the Wheldrake ward of City of York Council, 2003-2011

=== Hull Road ward ===
Part of the parish of Heslington

Hull Road
Party	Candidate	Votes	%
Labour Co-op	Neil Barnes *	1,999	36.5
Labour Co-op	Hilary Shepherd	1,672	30.5
Labour Co-op	David Toby Levene †	1,599	29.2
Green	John Scobell Cossham	1,408	25.7
Conservative	Cameron Smith	1,256	22.9
Conservative	Bethany Hannah Wright	1,237	22.6
Conservative	Jordon Hennessy	1,195	21.8
Green	John Patrick Heawood	1,031	18.8
Green	Stuart Harry Maule	857	15.6
UKIP	Keith Philip Anderson	667	12.2
Liberal Democrats	Rachel Sarah Edwards	609	11.1
Liberal Democrats	Thomas Alexander Davies	492	9.0
Liberal Democrats	Lizzy Roberts	457	8.3
TUSC	Megan Jessica Ollerhead	201	3.7
Turnout		5,547	44.7
Labour Co-op win (new seat)			
Labour Co-op win (new seat)			
Labour Co-op win (new seat)			

* Represented the Hull Road ward of City of York Council, 2011-2015

† Represented the Heslington ward of City of York Council, 2011-2015

=== Huntington and New Earswick ward ===
The parishes of Huntington and New Earswick

Huntington and New Earswick
Party	Candidate	Votes	%	±%
Liberal Democrats	Keith Orrell *	2,885	45.1	
Liberal Democrats	Chris Cullwick	2,859	44.7	
Liberal Democrats	Carol Elizabeth Runciman †	2,814	44.0	
Labour	Michael Healy	1,427	22.3	
Conservative	Susan Vaughan	1,388	21.7	
Conservative	Tet Powell	1,263	19.8	
Labour	Lucas Jacob Pearce	1,136	17.8	
Conservative	Gavin Michael Shillito	1,133	17.7	
Labour	Jason Rose	1,132	17.7	
Green	Charles Dixon Everett	693	10.8	
Green	Clive Barker Woolley	621	9.7	
Green	Clive Millard	569	8.9	
Turnout		6,617	63.7	23.4
Liberal Democrats hold				
Liberal Democrats hold				
Liberal Democrats hold				

There were no boundary changes to Huntington and New Earswick ward.

* Represented the Huntington and New Earswick ward of City of York Council, 2003-2015

† Represented the Huntington and New Earswick ward of City of York Council, 1999-2015

=== Micklegate ward ===
Micklegate
Party	Candidate	Votes	%	±%
Independent	Johnny Hayes	2,843	42.4	
Labour	Julie Christine Gunnell *	2,393	35.7	
Green	Lars Kramm	1,919	28.6	
Labour	Nick Button	1,611	24.0	
Green	Mark Havercroft	1,526	22.7	
Green	Helen Johnson	1,495	22.3	
Labour	Dave Merrett †	1,425	21.2	
Conservative	Marc Lee Allinson	1,332	19.9	
Conservative	Bill Hanbury	1,105	16.5	
Conservative	Paul Stratford Healey ‡	1,091	16.3	
Liberal Democrats	Martin Bartlett §	466	6.9	
Liberal Democrats	Carlotta Allum	448	6.7	
Liberal Democrats	Aileen Alison Hingston	290	4.3	
TUSC	Amanda Robinson	236	3.5	
Turnout		6,774	69.5	22.4
Independent gain from Labour				
Labour hold				
Green gain from Labour				

There were no boundary changes to Micklegate ward.

* Represented the Micklegate ward of City of York Council, 2007-2015

† Represented the Bishophill ward of York City Council, 1982-1996, the Bishophill ward of City of York Council, 1995-2003, and the Micklegate ward of City of York Council, 2003-2015

‡ Represented the Rural West York ward of City of York Council, 2007-2015

§ Represented the Holgate ward of City of York Council, 2003-2007

=== Osbaldwick and Derwent ward ===
The parishes of Dunnington, Holtby, Kexby, Murton, and Osbaldwick

Osbaldwick and Derwent
Party	Candidate	Votes	%
Conservative	Jenny Mary Brooks *	1,989	46.4
Independent	Mark Jonathan Warters †	1,167	27.2
Conservative	Robin Nicholas Dickson ‡	1,162	27.1
Liberal Democrats	Rosalind Anne Maggs	934	21.8
Labour	Callum John Shannon	684	15.9
Labour	Mark Alan Windmill	458	10.7
Liberal Democrats	Richard Ian Hill	421	9.8
Green	Sally Heather Brooks	400	9.3
Green	Derek Ross Bennett	310	7.2
Turnout		4,351	71.5
Conservative win (new seat)			
Independent win (new seat)			

* Represented the Derwent ward of City of York Council, 2007-2015

† Represented the Osbaldwick ward of City of York Council, 2011-2015

‡ Represented the Fishergate division of North Yorkshire County Council, 1989-1993

=== Rawcliffe and Clifton Without ward ===
The parishes of Clifton Without and Rawcliffe

Rawcliffe and Clifton Without
Party	Candidate	Votes	%
Conservative	Peter Anthony Dew	2,325	37.2
Conservative	Stuart Richard Rawlings	2,085	33.4
Conservative	Samuel Douglas Lisle	1,905	30.5
Labour	Linsay Dawn Cunningham *	1,662	26.6
Liberal Democrats	Richard Ceri Shrimpton	1,576	25.2
Liberal Democrats	Mark Kelsall Waudby †	1,561	25.0
Labour	Neil Edward McIlveen *	1,441	23.1
Liberal Democrats	Samantha Jane Waudby	1,407	22.5
Labour	Ian Frederick Panter	1,347	21.6
Green	Caroline Leonora Boreham	556	8.9
Green	Rodney James Bell	481	7.7
Green	Robin Louis Brabham	426	6.8
Turnout		6,391	65.5
Conservative win (new seat)			
Conservative win (new seat)			
Conservative win (new seat)			

* Represented the Skelton, Rawcliffe, and Clifton Without ward of City of York Council, 2011-2015

† Represented the Rawcliffe and Skelton ward of City of York Council, 1999-2003, and the Skelton, Rawcliffe, and Clifton Without ward of City of York Council, 2003-2007

=== Rural West York ward ===
The parishes of Askham Bryan, Askham Richard, Hessay, Nether Poppleton, Rufforth with Knapton, Skelton, and Upper Poppleton

Rural West York
Party	Candidate	Votes	%
Conservative	John Ian Gillies *	2,428	51.7
Conservative	Christopher David Steward †	2,052	43.7
Liberal Democrats	Jayne Bradley	1,022	21.8
Labour	Paul Kind	663	14.1
Independent	Joseph David Watt ‡	661	14.1
Labour	Victoria Prior	541	11.5
Liberal Democrats	Gareth Glyn Morgan	454	9.7
Green	Sally Hind	373	7.9
Green	Gillian Cossham	358	7.6
Turnout		4,741	73.5
Conservative win (new seat)			
Conservative win (new seat)			

* Represented the Rural West York ward of City of York Council, 2007-2015

† Represented the Rural West York ward of City of York Council, 2011-2015

‡ Represented the Skelton, Rawcliffe, and Clifton Without ward of City of York Council, 2003-2011

=== Strensall ward ===
The parishes of Earswick, Stockton-on-the-Forest, and Strensall with Towthorpe

Strensall
Party	Candidate	Votes	%	±%
Conservative	Paul Anthony Doughty *	2,385	54.8	
Conservative	Lorraine Helen Douglas †	1,886	43.3	
Liberal Democrats	Anthony Hainsworth Fisher ‡	1,369	31.4	
Liberal Democrats	David Murray Goodall	775	17.8	
Labour	Ann Hilary Moxon	605	13.9	
Labour	John Anthony Gorner	574	13.2	
Green	Robbie Bennett	314	7.2	
Green	Matthew John Durrant	245	5.6	
Turnout		4,411	67.4	25.2
Conservative hold				
Conservative hold				

There were no boundary changes to Strensall ward.

* Represented the Strensall ward of City of York Council, 2011-2015

† Represented the Clifton ward of City of York Council, 2007-2015

‡ Represented the Haxby West ward of Ryedale District Council, 1987-1996

=== Westfield ward ===
Westfield
Party	Candidate	Votes	%	±%
Liberal Democrats	Andrew Waller *	2,866	49.1	
Liberal Democrats	Susan Hunter	2,369	40.6	
Liberal Democrats	Sheena Jackson	2,106	36.1	
Labour	Louise Elizabeth Corson	1,564	26.8	
Labour	Stephen Andrew Burton †	1,464	25.1	
Labour	Reece Goscinski	1,185	20.3	
Conservative	Andrew Andrew Gilchrist Brooks	784	13.4	
Conservative	Victoria Donnor	770	13.2	
Conservative	Helen Jane Steward	655	11.2	
Green	Alison Jane Webb	650	11.1	
Green	Catherine Rachel Heinemeyer	575	9.8	
Green	Sebastian James Butterworth	545	9.3	
TUSC	John Pau Handforth	224	3.8	
Turnout		5,941	58.5	20.5
Liberal Democrats gain from Labour				
Liberal Democrats gain from Labour				
Liberal Democrats gain from Labour				

There were no boundary changes to Westfield ward.

* Represented the Westfield ward of York City Council, 1994-1996, and the Westfield ward of City of York Council, 1999-2011 and 2014-2015

† Represented the Westfield ward of City of York Council, 2011-2015

=== Wheldrake ward ===
The parishes of Deighton, Elvington, Naburn, and Wheldrake

Wheldrake
Party	Candidate	Votes	%	±%
Conservative	Susan Norma Mercer	1,638	64.1	7.9
Labour	Caroline Susan Hind	405	15.8	2.3
Liberal Democrats	Jonathan Peter Stott	281	11.0	−15.5
Green	William Robert Hilary Dyson	232	9.1	5.3
Turnout		2,556	76.4	22.8
Conservative hold				

There were no boundary changes to Wheldrake ward.
