= 2007 City of York Council election =

2007 election for City of York council

City of York Council Election, 2007
- 3 May 2007

All 47 seats to City of York Council 24 seats needed for a majority
	First party	Second party	Third party
Leader	Steve Galloway	Dave Merrett	Ian Gillies
Party	Liberal Democrats	Labour	Conservative
Leader since	1999	2002	N/A
Leader's seat	Westfield	Micklegate	Rural West
Last election	29	15	0
Seats before	29	15	0
Seats won	19	18	8
Seat change	▼10	▲3	▲8
Popular vote	43,728	36,746	37,171
Percentage	32.1%	26.9%	27.3%
Swing	▼17.0%	▲0.8%	▲13.6%
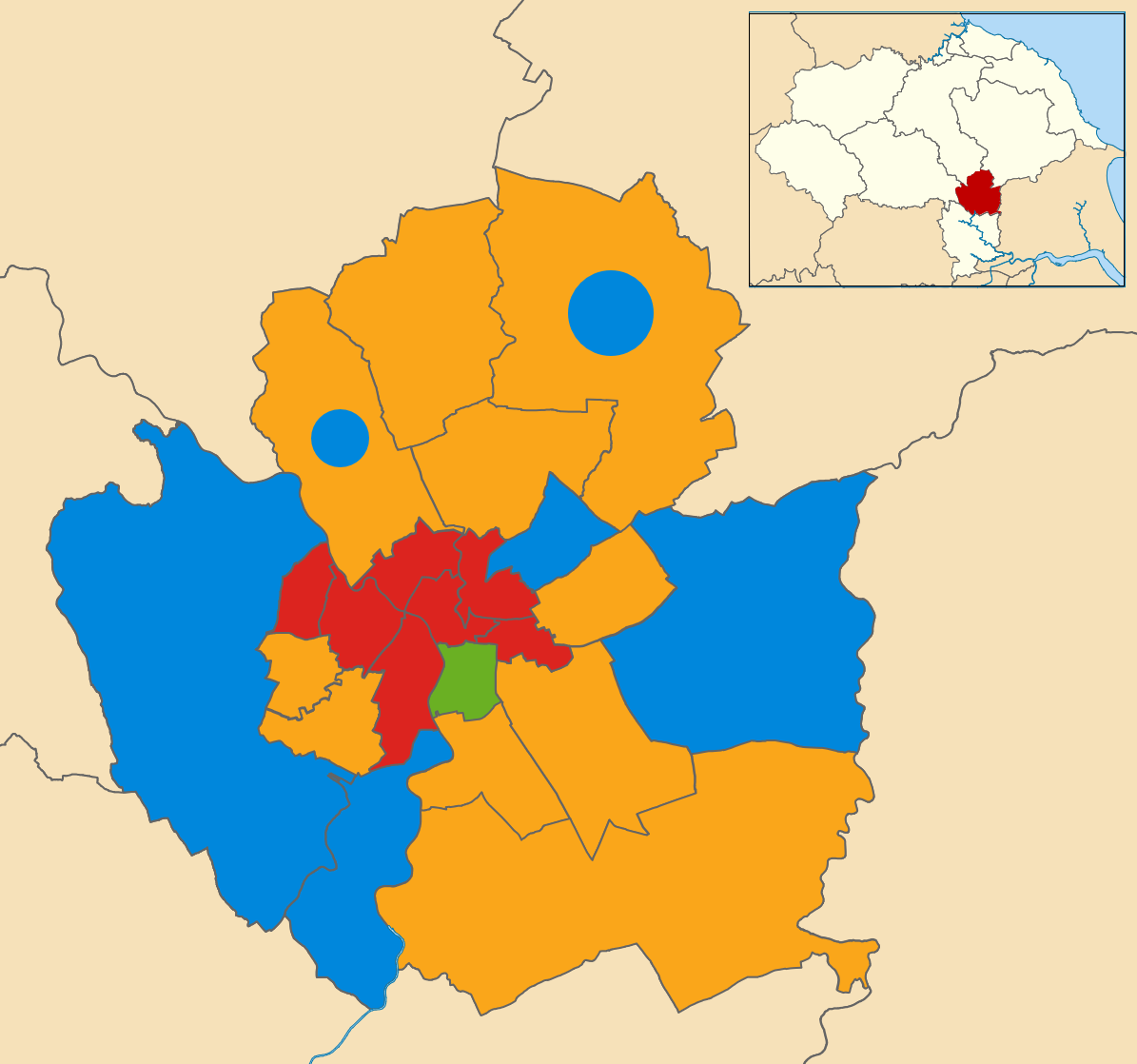
Leader of the Council before election
Steve Galloway
Liberal Democrats
Leader of the Council after election
Steve Galloway
Liberal Democrats

Local elections for City of York Council were held on Thursday 3 May 2007. The whole council was up for election. Of the 47 seats contested, the Liberal Democrats won 19 seats, Labour won 18 seats, Conservatives won eight seats and the Green Party won two seats.

The election saw York's ruling Liberal Democrats lose ten seats and overall control of the council. The Labour Party made a modest recovery in what was otherwise a poor set of local elections nationally for the party, but still came one seat behind the Liberal Democrats. The Conservative Party, who had never won more than three seats since the formation of the unitary authority and had been wiped out four years earlier, made a breakthrough in this election, finishing second in the popular vote and winning eight seats, though their support was too concentrated in the outskirts of the city to win more seats.

Following the election, the Liberal Democrats formed a minority administration with the tacit support of the Green Party, who won two seats. The Liberal Democrats would strengthen their position a few months after the election following the death of Heworth Without councillor Bill Bennett, winning the seat from the Conservatives.

== Election result ==
City of York Council election 2007
Party	Candidates						Votes		
Party	Stood	Elected	Gained	Unseated	Net	% of total	%	No.	Net %
Liberal Democrats	47	19	0	10	-10	40.4%	32.1%	43,728	-17.0%
Labour	43	18	3	0	+3	38.3%	26.9%	36,746	+0.8%
Conservative	47	8	8	0	+8	17.0%	27.3%	37,171	+13.6%
Green	27	2	0	0	0	4.3%	10.5%	14,334	+4.2%
BNP	9	0	0	0	0	0%	2.6%	3,582	N/A
Respect	1	0	0	0	0	0%	0.3%	421	N/A
Liberal	2	0	0	0	0	0%	0.2%	247	N/A
Monster Raving Loony	1	0	0	0	0	0%	0.1%	161	+0.2%

== Ward results ==
=== Acomb ward ===
Acomb
Party	Candidate	Votes	%	±%
Labour	David Anthony Horton *	1,303	24.9	−1.0
Labour	Tracey Louise Simpson-Laing †	1,301	24.9	−1.4
Conservative	Michael Tucker	529	10.1	0.2
BNP	Ian Geoffrey Dawson	520	10.0	10.0
Liberal Democrats	Rachel Johanne Lewis-Strodder	448	8.6	−10.8
Conservative	David Thompson	426	8.2	8.2
Liberal Democrats	Reuban Alexander Mayne	399	7.6	−8.1
Green	Will Dyson	297	5.7	5.7
Turnout		5,223	44.6	9.6
Labour hold				
Labour hold				

* Represented the Acomb ward of York City Council, 1986-1996, and the Acomb ward of City of York Council, 1995-2007

† Represented the Acomb ward of City of York Council, 1999-2007

=== Bishopthorpe ward ===
The parishes of Acaster Malbis and Bishopthorpe

Bishopthorpe
Party	Candidate	Votes	%	±%
Conservative	John Christopher Galvin *	851	49.2	19.7
Liberal Democrats	David Geoffrey Livesley †	540	31.2	−27.3
Labour	Fiona Kathleen Smith	217	12.5	0.6
Green	Richard Michael Thurley	122	7.1	7.1
Turnout		1,730	54.3	0.7
Conservative gain from Liberal Democrats				

* Represented the Copmanthorpe ward of City of York Council, 1999-2003

† Represented the Copmanthorpe ward of City of York Council, 1999-2003, and the Bishopthorpe ward of City of York Council 2003-2007

=== Clifton ward ===
Clifton
Party	Candidate	Votes	%	±%
Labour	Kenneth William King *	1,438	16.9	3.7
Labour	Lorraine Helen Douglas	1,367	16.1	1.7
Labour	David Lee Scott †	1,242	14.6	3.5
Green	Ginnie Shaw	743	8.8	3.0
Conservative	Oliver James Blair	580	6.8	6.8
Conservative	Kevin Paul Hollinrake	576	6.8	6.8
Liberal Democrats	Karoline Mary Elizabeth Kirk	551	6.5	−4.4
Liberal Democrats	Matthew Jonathan Reid	545	6.4	−4.4
Liberal Democrats	Derek Waudby	494	5.8	−4.0
Respect	Les Marsh	421	4.9	4.9
Conservative	Thomas McConnell	304	3.6	3.6
BNP	Rich Leeming	251	2.9	2.9
Turnout		8,515	33.5	5.7
Labour hold				
Labour hold				
Labour hold				

* Represented the Bootham ward of York City Council, 1982-1996, the Fishergate division of North Yorkshire County Council, 1985-1989, the Bootham ward of City of York Council, 1995-2003, and the Clifton ward of City of York Council, 2003-2007

† Represented the Clifton ward of City of York Council, 2003-2007

=== Derwent ward ===
The parishes of Dunnington, Holtby, and Kexby

Derwent
Party	Candidate	Votes	%	±%
Conservative	Jenny Brooks	841	53.2	18.8
Liberal Democrats	Rosalind Anne Maggs	514	32.5	−24.1
Labour	Dennis Albert Martin	174	11.0	2.0
Green	Gillian Mary Cossham	53	3.4	3.4
Turnout		1,582	53.5	4.8
Conservative gain from Liberal Democrats				

=== Dringhouses and Woodthorpe ward ===
Dringhouses and Woodthorpe
Party	Candidate	Votes	%	±%
Liberal Democrats	Ann Lorraine Reid *	1,611	14.6	−4.9
Liberal Democrats	Susan Sunderland †	1,503	13.6	−4.1
Liberal Democrats	Thomas Paul Holvey †	1,445	13.1	−3.1
Conservative	Matthew Litten	1,155	10.5	2.8
Conservative	Barbara Jean Vernon	1,112	10.1	2.9
Conservative	Paul Stewart Vernon	1,064	9.7	3.0
Labour	Thomas Farnsworth Wright	934	8.5	−1.1
Labour	Geoffrey Roy Beacon	865	7.8	0.0
Labour	Gerard Paul Hodgson	830	7.5	0.0
Green	John David Gray	504	4.6	4.6
Turnout		11,023	45.2	3.7
Liberal Democrats hold				
Liberal Democrats hold				
Liberal Democrats hold				

* Represented the Foxwood ward of York City Council, 1990-1996, the Foxwood ward of City of York Council, 1995-2003, and the Dringhouses and Woodthorpe ward of City of York Council, 2003-2007

† Represented the Dringhouses and Woodthorpe ward of City of York Council, 2003-2007

=== Fishergate ward ===
Fishergate
Party	Candidate	Votes	%	±%
Green	Andy D'Agorne *	1,308	25.0	−0.6
Green	Dave Taylor	1,086	20.7	−3.3
Labour	Ernest Peter Dickinson	706	13.5	0.5
Conservative	Robin Nicholas Dickson †	649	12.4	−0.1
Labour	Thomas Gibson	576	11.0	−0.1
Conservative	Michael James Rutherford	495	9.5	9.5
Liberal Democrats	Susan Jacqueline Nunn	157	3.0	−4.5
Liberal Democrats	Nicholas Frederick James Hudson	146	2.8	−3.4
BNP	Stephen Mark Phillips	111	2.1	2.1
Turnout		5,234	44.9	6.9
Green hold				
Green hold				

* Represented the Fishergate ward of City of York Council, 2003-2007

† Represented the Fishergate division of North Yorkshire County Council, 1989-1993

=== Fulford ward ===
The parish of Fulford

Fulford
Party	Candidate	Votes	%	±%
Liberal Democrats	Keith Richard James Aspden *	503	44.4	−4.1
Labour	Alan Michael Smith	266	23.5	−4.6
Green	Denise Craghill	212	18.7	11.2
Conservative	Samantha Laura Suddons	153	13.5	−2.5
Turnout		1,134	51.6	4.3
Liberal Democrats hold				

* Represented the Fulford ward of City of York Council, 2003-2007

=== Guildhall ward ===
Guildhall
Party	Candidate	Votes	%	±%
Labour	Janet Mary Looker *	785	24.1	1.4
Labour	Brian Walter Joseph Edward Watson †	654	20.1	0.8
Conservative	Matthew James Kilburn	413	12.7	1.8
Conservative	Jonathan Francis Meehan	343	10.5	10.5
Green	John Norris	302	9.3	2.5
Green	Candy Spillard	248	7.6	2.3
Liberal Democrats	Jacqueline Sandra Talbot	180	5.5	−12.7
Liberal Democrats	Peter Laurence Benedict Reid	175	5.4	−8.8
Liberal	Andrew Thomas Hinkles	158	4.8	4.8
Turnout		3,258	31.2	3.2
Labour hold				
Labour hold				

* Represented the Guildhall division of North Yorkshire County Council, 1985-1996, and the Guildhall ward of City of York Council, 1995-2007

† Represented the Acomb ward of York City Council, 1979-1984, the Guildhall ward of York City Council, 1988-1996, the Acomb division of North Yorkshire County Council, 1981-1989, and the Guildhall ward of City of York Council, 1995-2007

=== Haxby and Wigginton ward ===
The parishes of Haxby and Wigginton

Haxby and Wigginton
Party	Candidate	Votes	%	±%
Liberal Democrats	Christopher McDonald Hogg *	1,887	15.5	−9.2
Liberal Democrats	Paul Firth	1,740	14.3	−11.8
Liberal Democrats	Richard Watson †	1,649	13.6	−9.3
Conservative	Tony Richardson	1,579	13.0	7.3
Conservative	Robert John Phillips	1,533	12.6	6.1
Conservative	Joe Tidmarsh	1,435	11.8	11.8
BNP	Geoff Carr	620	5.1	5.1
Green	Alan Philip Robertshaw	595	4.9	0.8
Labour	Gerald Patrick Colbeck	590	4.9	1.3
Labour	Richard Hugh Smyth	533	4.4	0.9
Turnout		12,161	44.3	3.3
Liberal Democrats hold				
Liberal Democrats hold				
Liberal Democrats hold				

* Represented the Haxby / Wigginton division of North Yorkshire County Council, 1993-1996, the Haxby ward of City of York Council, 1995-2003, and the Haxby and Wigginton ward of City of York Council, 2003-2007

† Represented the Haxby ward of City of York Council, 1999-2007

=== Heslington ward ===
The parish of Heslington

Heslington
Party	Candidate	Votes	%	±%
Liberal Democrats	Ceredig Ieuan Saville Jamieson-Ball *	436	38.4	−13.4
Green	Peter Sanderson	266	23.4	12.3
Labour	Alexandra Grace Fletcher-Hall	251	22.1	1.0
Conservative	Julia Henniker-Heaton	182	16.0	4.3
Turnout		1,135	37.2	17.3
Liberal Democrats hold				

* Represented the Heslington ward of City of York Council, 2003-2007

=== Heworth ward ===
Heworth
Party	Candidate	Votes	%	±%
Labour	Paul William Ronald Blanchard *	1,470	16.2	−1.3
Labour	Ruth Elizabeth Potter †	1,456	16.1	−0.4
Labour	Christina Mary Funnell	1,380	15.2	−3.6
Conservative	James Schofield	830	9.2	1.4
Conservative	Charlie Dyson	828	9.1	9.1
Green	Jennifer Jane Aitken	716	7.9	3.1
Conservative	Andrew Mason Wells	577	6.4	6.4
BNP	Jeff Kelly	507	5.6	5.6
Liberal Democrats	Sam Blackburn	487	5.4	−7.6
Liberal Democrats	Robin Alec Joseph Hazzard-Gallagher	432	4.8	−7.0
Liberal Democrats	Ian Ernest Packington	382	4.2	−5.7
Turnout		9,065	37.5	5.0
Labour hold				
Labour hold				
Labour hold				

* Represented the Heworth ward of City of York Council, 2003-2007

† Represented the Beckfield ward of City of York Council, 1999-2003, and the Heworth ward of City of York Council, 2003-2007

=== Heworth Without ward ===
The parish of Heworth Without

Heworth Without
Party	Candidate	Votes	%	±%
Conservative	Bill Bennett	640	37.7	4.6
Liberal Democrats	Nigel John Ayre	605	35.7	−14.3
Labour	Andrew David Garbutt	288	17.0	0.0
Liberal	Nick Blitz *	89	5.2	5.2
Green	Baz Buchanan	75	4.4	4.4
Turnout		1,697	55.1	10.8
Conservative gain from Liberal Democrats				

* Represented the Monk ward of City of York Council, 2000-2003

=== Holgate ward ===
Holgate
Party	Candidate	Votes	%	±%
Labour	Denise Wendy Bowgett	1,490	14.0	−0.9
Labour	James Martin Alexander	1,413	13.2	−0.3
Labour	Sonja Crisp	1,303	12.2	0.5
Liberal Democrats	Jonathan Peter Stott	1,286	12.0	−5.5
Liberal Democrats	Martin Richard Bartlett *	1,204	11.3	−6.5
Liberal Democrats	Gilbert Anderson Nimmo *	1,116	10.4	−4.8
Green	Andreas Heinemeyer	691	6.5	1.8
Conservative	James Alexander Robert McGowan	645	6.0	1.2
Conservative	Andrew Kay	604	5.7	5.7
Conservative	Thomas Merry	465	4.4	4.4
BNP	Michaela Susan Knight	463	4.3	4.3
Turnout		10,680	43.2	7.1
Labour gain from Liberal Democrats				
Labour gain from Liberal Democrats				
Labour gain from Liberal Democrats				

* Represented the Holgate ward of City of York Council, 2003-2007

=== Hull Road ward ===
Hull Road
Party	Candidate	Votes	%	±%
Labour	Richard Thomas Cregan *	819	18.3	−3.0
Labour	Roger Martin Pierce	803	17.9	−3.3
Conservative	Thomas William Basil Crockett	643	14.3	2.1
Conservative	Alan Richard Colborne Yonge	544	12.1	12.1
Liberal Democrats	Rachel Jane Williams	414	9.2	−2.0
Green	John Scobell Cossham	341	7.6	−2.2
Liberal Democrats	Michael James Johns-Perring	335	7.5	−3.3
Green	Andrew John Collingwood	327	7.3	7.3
BNP	Trevor David Brown	259	5.8	5.8
Turnout		4,485	35.8	8.7
Labour hold				
Labour hold				

* Represented the Beckfield ward of City of York Council, 1995-2003

=== Huntington and New Earswick ward ===
The parishes of Huntington and New Earswick

Huntington and New Earswick
Party	Candidate	Votes	%	±%
Liberal Democrats	Keith Ian Hyman *	1,802	18.7	−6.2
Liberal Democrats	Keith Orrell *	1,794	18.6	−6.9
Liberal Democrats	Carol Elizabeth Runciman †	1,695	17.6	−4.9
Conservative	Sylvia Ann Greenway	896	9.3	9.3
Conservative	Paul Tumman	794	8.2	−0.4
Conservative	Roger Holmes	707	7.3	7.3
Labour	Stephen Andrew Burton	672	7.0	0.9
Green	Clive Barker Woolley	660	6.8	−0.1
Labour	James Alexander Flinders	629	6.5	0.9
Turnout		9,650	37.2	2.5
Liberal Democrats hold				
Liberal Democrats hold				
Liberal Democrats hold				

* Represented the Huntington and New Earswick ward of City of York Council, 2003-2007

† Represented the Huntington and New Earswick ward of City of York Council, 1999-2007

=== Micklegate ward ===
Micklegate
Party	Candidate	Votes	%	±%
Labour	David Martin Merrett *	1,514	13.6	−1.7
Labour	Sandy Fraser †	1,497	13.5	−1.9
Labour	Julie Christine Gunnell	1,478	13.3	−1.3
Green	Andrew David Chase	1,414	12.7	3.8
Green	Alan Peter Swain	1,266	11.4	4.1
Green	Charles Dixon Everett	1,097	9.9	2.8
Conservative	Walter Louis Davy	696	6.3	−0.6
Conservative	Simon John Darby	642	5.8	5.8
Conservative	John Wilson	576	5.2	5.2
Liberal Democrats	Carole Ann Green	383	3.4	−4.5
Liberal Democrats	Gillian Edwina Florence Thompson	299	2.7	−4.6
Liberal Democrats	John Tull	268	2.4	−4.8
Turnout		11,130	42.8	10.2
Labour hold				
Labour hold				
Labour hold				

* Represented the Bishophill ward of York City Council, 1982-1996, the Bishophill ward of City of York Council, 1995-2003, and the Micklegate ward of City of York Council, 2003-2007

† Represented the Micklegate ward of City of York Council, 2003-2007

=== Osbaldwick ward ===
The parishes of Murton and Osbaldwick

Osbaldwick
Party	Candidate	Votes	%	±%
Liberal Democrats	Jonathan Peter Morley *	459	40.7	−9.6
Conservative	Terry Roy Smith	319	28.3	28.3
Labour	Thomas Williams	222	19.7	8.2
Green	David Williams	128	11.3	11.3
Turnout		1,128	42.5	3.0
Liberal Democrats hold				

* Represented the Osbaldwick / Heworth division of North Yorkshire County Council, 1985-1996, and the Osbaldwick ward of City of York Council, 1999-2007

=== Rural West York ward ===
The parishes of Askham Bryan, Askham Richard, Copmanthorpe, Hessay, Nether Poppleton, Rufforth with Knapton, and Upper Poppleton

Rural West York
Party	Candidate	Votes	%	±%
Conservative	John Ian Gillies	1,993	17.0	6.0
Conservative	Paul Stratford Healey	1,738	14.8	2.7
Conservative	Ben Hudson	1,672	14.3	5.1
Liberal Democrats	Glen Anthony Bradley *	1,644	14.0	1.3
Liberal Democrats	Quentin John Angus Macdonald †	1,539	13.1	−2.1
Liberal Democrats	Marjorie Patricia Stones	1,442	12.3	0.4
Green	Martin Lovedale	579	4.9	4.9
Labour	Karl David Smith	575	4.9	0.1
Labour	Susan Elizabeth Watson	532	4.5	0.6
Turnout		11,714	50.6	6.7
Conservative gain from Independent				
Conservative gain from Liberal Democrats				
Conservative gain from Liberal Democrats				

* Represented the Rural West York ward of City of York Council, 2003-2007

† Represented the Upper Poppleton ward of City of York Council, 1995-2003, and the Rural West York ward of City of York Council, 2003-2007

=== Skelton, Rawcliffe, and Clifton Without ward ===
The parishes of Clifton Without, Rawcliffe, and Skelton

Skelton, Rawcliffe, and Clifton Without
Party	Candidate	Votes	%	±%
Liberal Democrats	Irene Mary Waudby *	1,404	13.3	−7.5
Conservative	Joe Watt	1,340	12.7	6.3
Liberal Democrats	Richard Stanley Moore †	1,288	12.2	−4.5
Conservative	Jennie Gambold	1,243	11.8	5.7
Liberal Democrats	Phill Thomas	1,140	10.8	−6.9
Conservative	Andrew McCloud	882	8.4	8.4
Labour	Matthew David Greenway	811	7.7	0.7
Labour	Rosemary Gloria Thornton	735	7.0	1.1
Labour	Iain Alexander Simpson-Laing	708	6.7	1.1
Green	Nicholas Eugene Whittingham	530	5.0	0.6
BNP	Mal Campbell	444	4.2	4.2
Turnout		10,525	38.9	5.3
Liberal Democrats hold				
Liberal Democrats hold				
Conservative gain from Liberal Democrats				

* Represented the Rawcliffe division of North Yorkshire County Council, 1989-1996, the Rawcliffe and Skelton ward of City of York Council, 1995-2003, and the Skelton, Rawcliffe, and Clifton Without ward of City of York Council, 2003-2007

† Represented the Skelton, Rawcliffe, and Clifton Without ward of City of York Council, 2003-2007

=== Strensall ward ===
The parishes of Earswick, Stockton-on-the-Forest, and Strensall with Towthorpe

Strensall
Party	Candidate	Votes	%	±%
Liberal Democrats	Madeleine Anne Kirk *	1,200	26.8	−2.9
Conservative	Beatrice Sian Wiseman	999	22.3	4.0
Liberal Democrats	Ian Michael Cuthbertson †	984	22.0	−4.6
Conservative	William Edmund Hanbury	770	17.2	1.2
Green	Caroline Leonora Boreham	269	6.0	6.0
Labour	Andrew James Dixon	257	5.7	0.6
Turnout		4,479	38.9	6.6
Liberal Democrats hold				
Conservative gain from Liberal Democrats				

* Represented the Skelton ward of Ryedale District Council, 1991-1996, and the Strensall ward of City of York Council, 1996-2007

† Represented the Strensall ward of City of York Council, 2003-2007

=== Westfield ward ===
Westfield
Party	Candidate	Votes	%	±%
Liberal Democrats	Susan Galloway *	1,512	16.4	−6.7
Liberal Democrats	Stephen Fred Galloway †	1,511	16.3	−9.9
Liberal Democrats	Andrew Michael Waller ‡	1,432	15.5	−9.2
Labour	Anne Lisa Ingham	887	9.6	1.6
Labour	Rebecca Eileen Crisp	869	9.4	2.1
Labour	Robert Scrase §	758	8.2	1.2
Conservative	Kenneth John Beavan ¶	457	4.9	1.3
Conservative	Charles Andrew Gilchrist Brooks	455	4.9	4.9
Green	John Robert Forrester	437	4.7	4.7
BNP	Graeme Patrick Wiles	407	4.4	4.4
Conservative	Thomas Cornelis Cahill	358	3.9	3.9
Monster Raving Loony	Eddie Vee	161	1.7	1.7
Turnout		9,244	35.0	3.5
Liberal Democrats hold				
Liberal Democrats hold				
Liberal Democrats hold				

* Represented the Westfield ward of York City Council, 1973-1979, the Foxwood ward of York City Council, 1979-1996, the Westfield division of North Yorkshire County Council, 1973-1985, the Foxwood division of North Yorkshire County Council, 1985-1996, and the Foxwood ward of City of York Council, 1995-2007

† Represented the Westfield ward of York City Council, 1979-1996, the Westfield division of North Yorkshire County Council, 1993-1996, and the Westfield ward of City of York Council, 1995-2007

‡ Represented the Westfield ward of York City Council, 1994-1996, and the Westfield ward of City of York Council, 1999-2007

§ Represented the Holgate ward of York City Council, 1992-1996, and the Holgate ward of City of York Council, 1995-2003

¶ Represented the Micklegate ward of York City Council, 1991-1996

=== Wheldrake ward ===
The parishes of Deighton, Elvington, Naburn, and Wheldrake

Wheldrake
Party	Candidate	Votes	%	±%
Liberal Democrats	Christian Vassie *	784	47.9	−14.9
Conservative	Jonathan Mark Maughan	638	38.9	9.6
Labour	Margaret Ruth Martin	148	9.0	1.1
Green	Tracy Lynn Shippey	68	4.2	4.2
Turnout		1,638	51.1	0.6
Liberal Democrats hold				

* Represented the Wheldrake ward of City of York Council, 2003-2007
