= Institut national de la recherche scientifique =

Research-oriented branch of the Université du Québec

Coordinates: 45°31′0.14″N 73°34′3.26″W

National Institute of Scientific Research
- Institut national de la recherche scientifique
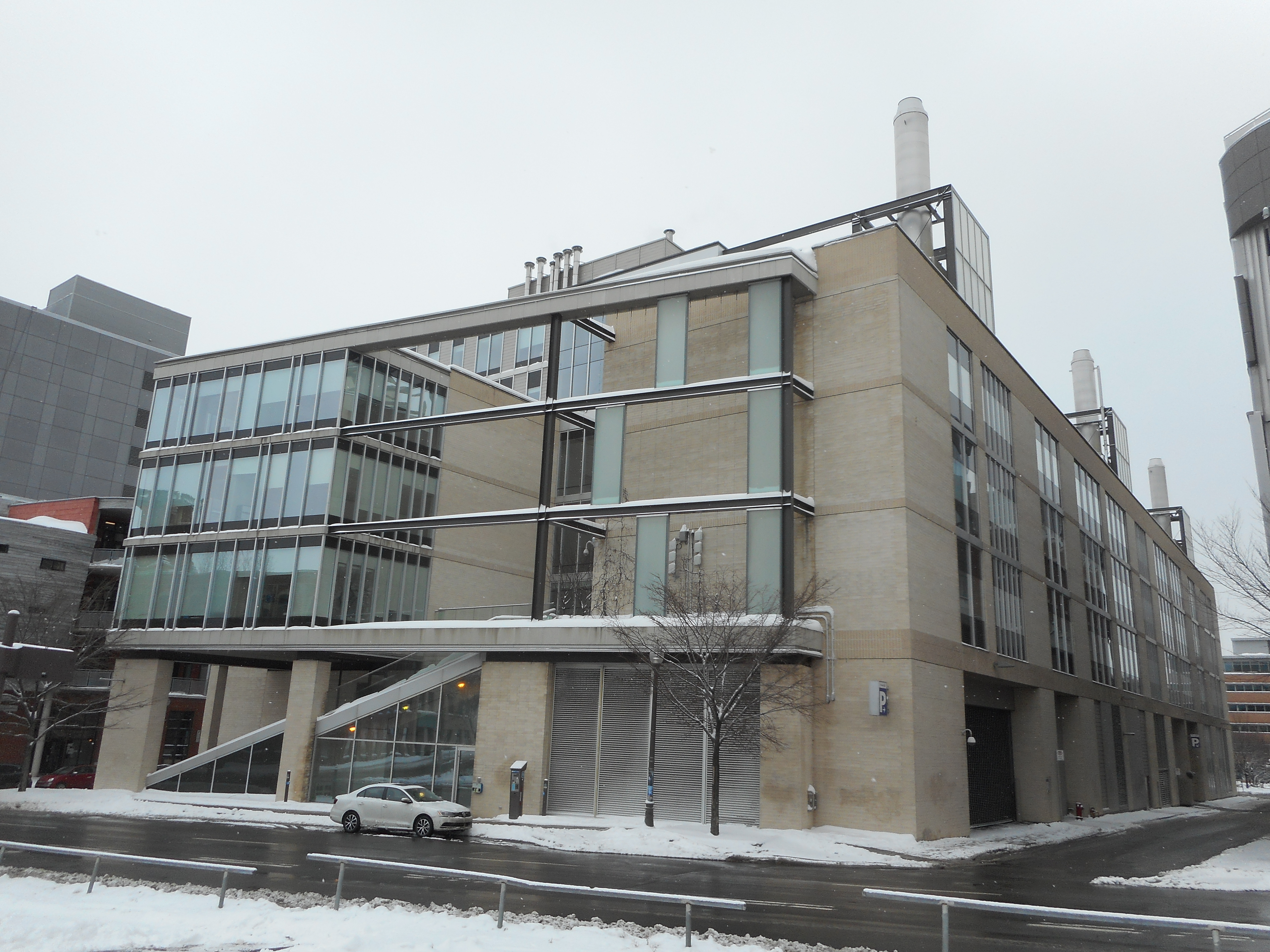
- INRS building in Quebec City
- Motto: La science en action pour un monde en evolution
- Motto in English: Science in action for a world in evolution
- Type: Public
- Established: 1969
- Parent institution: Université du Québec
- Affiliations: UACC, IAU
- President: Armand Couture
- Location: Quebec, Canada
- Campus: Urban/Suburban, five campuses throughout Quebec, with campuses in Quebec City and Montreal, Laval, and Varennes.
Colours
INRS Blue
- Nickname: INRS
- Website: www.inrs.ca
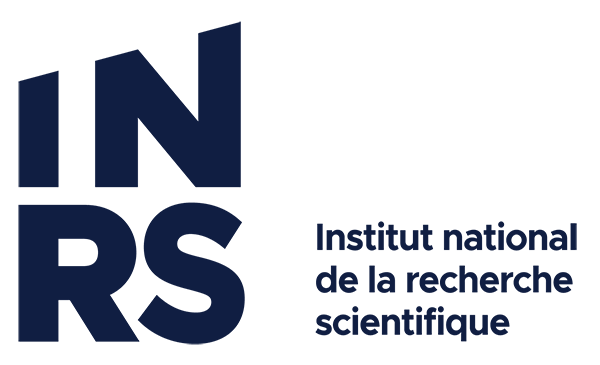

The Institut national de la recherche scientifique (French pronunciation: [ɛ̃stity nɑsjɔnal də la ʁəʃɛʁʃ sjɑ̃tifik]; "National Institute for Scientific Research") is the research-oriented constituent university of the Université du Québec system that offers only graduate studies. INRS conducts research in four broad sectors: water, earth and the environment; energy, materials and telecommunications; human, animal and environmental health; and urbanization, culture and society.

INRS has facilities in Quebec City, Montreal, Laval, and Varennes. It was established by letters patent from the Quebec Government and operates under the Act respecting the Université du Québec.

The Énergie, Matériaux et Télécommunications (EMT, Energy, Materials and Telecommunications) INRS-EMT is part of INRS.

== Programs ==
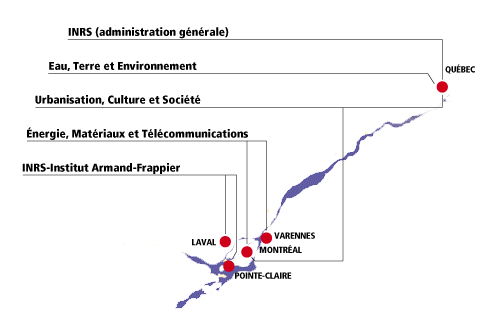
Institut National de la recherche scientifique

The Institut national de la recherche scientifique offers programs in:

- Water, Earth and Environment
  - Master's in water sciences
  - Doctorate in water sciences
  - Master's in earth sciences
  - Master's in earth sciences – environmental technologies
  - Doctorate in earth sciences
- Energy, Materials and Telecommunications
  - Master's in energy and materials sciences
  - Doctorate in energy and materials sciences
  - Master's in telecommunications
    - Joint Network IT
  - Doctorate in telecommunications
  - Master's in telecommunications
- INRS – Institute Armand Frappier
  - Master's in experimental health sciences
  - Master's in applied microbiology
  - Master's in virology and immunology
  - Doctorate in virology and immunology
  - Doctorate in biology
- INRS-Urbanisation, Culture et Société (Urbanization, Culture and Society)
  - Master's in urban studies
  - Doctorate in urban studies
  - Master's in demography
  - Doctorate in demography
  - Master's in research practice and public action
