= Lars Kramm =

British-German politician and scouting official

Regional Chair of the European Regional Scout Committee of the World Organization of the Scout Movement
- In office 2019–2021
- Preceded by: Kevin Camilleri

Personal details
- Born: Essen, Germany

Lars Martin Kramm is a British-German politician and scouting official who served as the Regional Chair of the European Regional Scout Committee of the World Organization of the Scout Movement (WOSM) from 2019 to 2022.

== Scouting ==
Lars Kramm first got involved in German Scouting by joining his local DPSG Cub Scout Pack in 1994 and followed the youth programme through. He became a Cub Scout Leader, Scout Leader, Group Scout Leader and later District Commissioner for Scouts in Essen-South.

Kramm was a member of Deutsche Pfadfinderschaft Sankt Georg's International Team between 2007 and 2016 and became International Commissioner in 2008. In this function, he served on the Central Council of the German Scout Federation. He was Head of the German Contingent to the Roverway 2009 in Iceland and the World Scout Jamboree 2011 in Sweden. In the Trinniuem 2013-2016, he served as a member of the regional working group member on External Relations & Funding. Kramm was part of the WOSM delegations at the CoP events of the UN Framework Convention on Climate Change (UNFCCC), and attended the COP17 in 2011 in Durban, the COP18 in Doha in 2012, and the COP19 in Warsaw in 2013.

Lars Kramm was first elected to the European Scout Committee at the European Scout Conference in Norway in 2016. He was re-elected to the European Scout Committee in 2019, and subsequently at the first meeting of the new Committee, the Committee elected him its chairperson. As Chairperson of the European Scout Region he also automatically became an ex officio member of the World Scout Committee.

== Political work ==
Lars Kramm was already active in the German Green Party. In his hometown of Essen, Kramm had been involved in the city executive board, as district group spokesman in Rellinghausen/Stadtwald and as a representative in different council committees. Kramm also served two terms as one of four permanent members of the German Greens' Federal Arbitration and Disciplinary Court.

Lars Kramm was first elected as a Green Party councillor to City of York Council as one of three councillors for the Micklegate ward at the 2015 City of York Council election. He got 1,919 votes and ousted incumbent Councillor and Cabinet Member Dave Merrett. It was the first time that a Green councillor was elected to City of York Council in Micklegate, winning the ward from the Labour Party.

Lars Kramm stood as a Green Party list candidate for Yorkshire and the Humber EU constituency in the 2019 European Parliament election in the United Kingdom.

In the 2019 United Kingdom general election, Lars Kramm was selected as Green party parliamentary candidate for the York Outer constituency. York Green Party later offered not to bid for the York Outer seat if the Liberal Democrats and Labour agree to throw support behind a single candidate to beat pro-Brexit incumbent MP Julian Sturdy. The Labour Party did not engage in the discussion, but controversially, Kramm later withdrew his candidacy as part of the Unite to Remain electoral pact to ensure not to split the remain vote and maximise the number of MPs elected who would oppose Brexit.
