= INRS-EMT =

University unit in Quebec, Canada

The Énergie, Matériaux et Télécommunications (EMT, Energy, Materials and Telecommunications) is part of the INRS research university in Quebec. The center has two separate locations: Montreal (Place Bonaventure) and Varennes. The center focuses its research activities in domains such as telecommunication networks, wireless communications, multi-media signal processing, RF systems and photonic ultra-fast photonics devices. In the area of energy, the main research directions are: materials and decentralized energy systems, energy modeling and analysis (GAME), magnetic confinement fusion.

== Student association ==
The student association is named "Céisme", an acronym for "Comité des Étudiants de l'INRS en Sciences des Matériaux et de l'Énergie". That acronym is also similar to a French word for earthquake (French: séisme). The center name changed to "Énergie, Matériaux et Télécommunications" but the student association name stayed.
