= City of York Council elections =

Class of election

== History ==
City of York Council is the unitary authority for the City of York, Yorkshire. It is responsible for all local government services within the City of York, except for services provided by York's town and parish councils.

== Non-metropolitan district elections ==
- 1973 York City Council election
- 1976 York City Council election
- 1979 York City Council election (New ward boundaries)
- 1980 York City Council election
- 1982 York City Council election
- 1983 York City Council election
- 1984 York City Council election
- 1986 York City Council election
- 1987 York City Council election
- 1988 York City Council election
- 1990 York City Council election
- 1991 York City Council election

=== 1992–1994 ===
A local election was held in May 1992 to elect members of York City Council. Fifteen seats, previously contested in 1988, were up for election: eleven were won by the Labour Party, three by the Conservative Party and one by the Liberal Democrats. The Labour Party retained overall control of the council; the composition of the council after the election was: Labour Party 34 seats, Conservative Party seven seats and Liberal Democrats four seats.

==== Local election ====
York local election results 1992
Party	Seats	Gains	Losses	Net gain/loss	Seats %	Votes %	Votes	+/−
Labour	11	0	1	▼1	-	45.1	-	-
Conservative	3	1	0	▲1	-	38.1	-	-
Liberal Democrats	1	0	0	0	-	13.3	-	-
Green	0	0	0	0	-	3.5	-	-

=== 1994–1995 ===
==== Local election ====
A local election took place in May 1994 to elect members of York City Council. Fifteen seats, previously contested in 1990, were up for election: twelve were won by the Labour Party, two by the Liberal Democrats and one by the Conservative Party.

York local election results 1991
Party	Seats	Gains	Losses	Net gain/loss	Seats %	Votes %	Votes	+/−
Labour	12	0	1	▼1	-	53.2	-	-
Liberal Democrats	2	1	0	▲1	-	21.6	-	-
Conservative	1	0	0	0	-	23.5	-	-
Green	0	0	0	0	-	1.7	-	-

== Unitary authority elections ==
=== Summary of local election results ===
Year	Labour	Liberal Democrats	Conservatives	Green	Independent
1995	30	18	3	0	2
1999	27	22	3	0	1
2003	15	29	0	2	1
2007	18	19	8	2	0
2011	26	8	10	2	1
2015	15	12	14	4	2
2019	17	21	2	4	3
2023	24	19	3	0	1

=== 1995–1999 ===
==== Local election ====
Elections to the new City of York Council unitary authority were held on 4 May 1995. Following the creation of the expanded authority, 22 councillors were returned to parished areas that were part of district council areas previously outside the boundaries of the former York City Council and 31 councillors were returned to the former York City Council wards. All 53 council seats were up for election. Labour won thirty seats, the Liberal Democrats won 18 seats, the Conservatives won three seats and two Independent councillors were also elected. The Labour Party won overall control of the council.

York local election result 1995
Party	Seats	Gains	Losses	Net gain/loss	Seats %	Votes %	Votes	+/−
Labour	30				56.6			
Liberal Democrats	18				34			
Conservative	3				5.7			
Independent	2				3.8			

==== By-elections ====
Strensall and Stockton Ward By-Election 30 May 1996
Party	Candidate	Votes	%	±%
Liberal Democrats	Madeleine Kirk	767	46.1	
Conservative		580	34.9	
Labour		317	19.1	
Majority		187	11.2	
Turnout		1,664	33.2	
Liberal Democrats hold		Swing		

Osbaldwick Ward By-Election 20 February 1997
Party	Candidate	Votes	%	±%
Liberal Democrats		661	55.5	
Labour		347	29.1	
Conservative		183	15.4	
Majority		314	26.4	
Turnout		1,191	50.6	
Liberal Democrats hold		Swing		

Micklegate Ward By-Election 30 October 1997
Party	Candidate	Votes	%	±%
Labour		847	53.0	+2.2
Conservative		529	32.1	−6.1
Liberal Democrats		244	14.8	+3.8
Majority		345	20.9	
Turnout		1,647	33.6	
Labour hold		Swing		

=== 1999–2003 ===
==== Local election ====
Elections to City of York Council were held on 6 May 1999. All 53 council seats in the city were up for election and the Labour party kept overall control of the council.

York local election result 1999
Party	Seats	Gains	Losses	Net gain/loss	Seats %	Votes %	Votes	+/−
Labour	27	0	3	-3	50.9			
Liberal Democrats	22	4	0	+4	41.5			
Conservative	3	1	1	0	5.7			
Independent	1	1	2	-1	1.9			

==== By-elections ====
A by-election was held in Bootham Ward following the resignation through ill-health of sitting Labour councillor Ken Cooper. The seat was won by the Liberal Democrat candidate, Kim Tarry.

Bootham Ward By-Election 11 May 2000
Party	Candidate	Votes	%	±%
Liberal Democrats	Kim Tarry	813	47.6	+25.1
Labour	Alexander Fraser	635	37.2	−23.8
Conservative	William Bennett	184	10.8	−5.8
Green	Andrea Black	59	3.5	+3.5
Monster Raving Loony	Graham Cambridge	18	1.1	+1.1
Majority		178		
Turnout		1710	35.3	
Liberal Democrats gain from Labour		Swing		

Labour councillor Peter Dodd resigned his Monk Ward seat in 2000 due to ill health. The seat was won in the by-election by the Liberal Democrat candidate, Nick Blitz.

Monk Ward By-Election 18 May 2000
Party	Candidate	Votes	%	±%
Liberal Democrats	Nick Blitz	1,180	46.9	+17.7
Labour	Alistair MacDonald	708	28.2	−15.8
Conservative	Kenneth Creek	545	21.7	−5.2
Green	Gillian Cossham	81	3.2	+3.2
Majority		472		
Turnout		2519	42.0	
Liberal Democrats gain from Labour		Swing		

A by-election was held following the death of Labour councillor Carol Wallace in 2000. David Evans retained the seat for the Labour Party.

Bishophill Ward By-Election 22 February 2001
Party	Candidate	Votes	%	±%
Labour	David Evans	686	36.9	−9.3
Liberal Democrats	Martin Bartlett	556	29.9	+12.7
Green	Andy Chase	370	19.9	+1.0
Conservative	Bill Bennett	246	13.2	−4.5
Majority		130	7.0	
Turnout		1,858	36.2	
Labour hold		Swing		

=== 2003–2007 ===
==== Local election ====
Local elections for City of York Council took place on 1 May 2003. Boundary changes reduced the number of seats from 53 to 47. The Liberal Democrats won 29 seats, Labour won 15 seats, the Green Party won two seats and an independent candidate won one seat. The Liberal Democrats won overall control of the council.

York local election result 2003
Party	Seats	Gains	Losses	Net gain/loss	Seats %	Votes %	Votes	+/−
Liberal Democrats	29	7	0	+7	61.7	42.5	25,142	
Labour	15	0	12	-12	31.9	22.6	13,361	
Conservative	0	0	3	-3	0	18.0	10,643	
Green	2	2	0	+2	4.3	8.8	5,192	
Independent	1	0	0	0				

=== 2007–2011 ===
==== Local election ====
Local elections for City of York Council took place on 3 May 2007. Of the 47 seats contested, the Liberal Democrats won 19 seats, Labour won 18 seats, Conservatives won eight seats and the Green Party won two seats. The Liberal Democrats lose ten seats and overall control of the council.

York local election result 2007
Party	Seats	Gains	Losses	Net gain/loss	Seats %	Votes %	Votes	+/−
Liberal Democrats	19	0	10	-10	40.43			
Labour	18	3	0	3	38.30			
Conservative	8	8	0	8	17.02			
Green	2	0	0	0	4.26			

==== By-elections ====
Following the death of Conservative councillor Bill Bennett in 2007, the Heworth Without seat was won by Liberal Democrat, Nigel Ayre.

Heworth Without Ward By-Election 6 September 2007
Party	Candidate	Votes	%	±%
Liberal Democrats	Nigel Ayre	914	46.7	+11.0
Conservative	Adam Sinclair	703	35.9	−1.8
Labour	Margaret Wells	219	11.2	−5.8
BNP	Michaela Knight	63	3.2	+3.2
Green	Charles Everett	58	3.0	−1.4
Majority		211	10.8	
Turnout		1,957	61.8	
Liberal Democrats gain from Conservative		Swing		

Labour councillor Paul Blanchard resigned for personal reasons in 2009. His Heworth seat was retained for Labour by Barbara Boyce.

Heworth Ward By-Election 10 September 2009
Party	Candidate	Votes	%	±%
Labour	Barbara Boyce	876	34.0	−2.7
Liberal Democrats	Jennifer Ayre	608	23.6	+11.5
Conservative	Andrew Whitney	591	23.0	+2.3
Green	Denise Craghill	302	11.7	−6.2
BNP	Jeff Kelly	172	6.7	−5.9
Monster Raving Loony	Eddie Vee	25	1.0	+1.0
Majority		268	10.4	
Turnout		2,581	26.6	
Labour hold		Swing		

Labour Councillor Dr. Roger Pierce resigned in 2010 due to ill health. His Hull Road seat was retained for Labour by Mick Hoban.

Hull Road Ward By-Election 14 October 2010
Party	Candidate	Votes	%	±%
Labour	Mick Hoban	860	58.7	+24.5
Conservative	Robin Dickson	296	20.2	−4.8
Liberal Democrats	Rachael Williams	183	12.5	−3.3
Green	John Cossham	84	5.7	−8.3
BNP	Trevor Brown	42	2.9	−8.1
Majority		564	38.4	
Turnout		1,468	18.3	
Labour hold		Swing		

=== 2011–2015 ===
==== Local election ====
Local elections for City of York Council took place on 5 May 2011. Of the 47 seats contested, Labour won 26 seats, Conservatives won ten seats, the Liberal Democrats won eight seats, the Green Party won two seats and an independent candidate won one seat. The Labour Party gained overall control of the council from no overall control.

York local election result 2011
Party	Seats	Gains	Losses	Net gain/loss	Seats %	Votes %	Votes	+/−
Labour	26	8	0	+8	55.3	31.6	20,297	+9.2%
Conservative	10	3	0	+3	24.1	21.9	15,472	-2.7%
Liberal Democrats	8	0	12	-12	17	26.4	16,888	-3.8%
Green	2	0	0	0	4.3	14.6	9,349	-0.4%
Independent	1	1	0	+1	2.1	0.4	630	+0.4%

==== By-elections ====
A by-election was held in October 2014 following the death of Councillor Lynn Jefferies. The seat was won by the Liberal Democrat candidate and former Council Leader Andrew Waller.

Westfield Ward By-Election 16 October 2014
Party	Candidate	Votes	%	±%
Liberal Democrats	Andrew Waller	1,804	60.2	+25.8
Labour	Louise Corson	588	19.6	−23.8
UKIP	Judith Morris	398	13.3	N/A
Conservative	Jason Brown	113	3.8	−10.0
Green	Alison Webb	87	2.9	−5.5
English Democrat	Sam Kelly	5	0.2	N/A
Majority		1,216	40.6	
Turnout		2995	28.5	−9.5
Liberal Democrats gain from Labour		Swing	24.8	

=== 2015–2019 ===
==== Local election ====
Local elections for City of York Council took place on 7 May 2015. New ward boundaries came into effect. Of the 47 seats contested, Labour won 15 seats to form the largest group on the council, Conservatives won 14 seat, the Liberal Democrats won 12 seats, the Green Party won four seats and two independent candidates won seats. Following talks between the political groups after the election, the Conservatives and Liberal Democrats agreed to run the council as a joint administration.

York local election result 2015
Party	Seats	Gains	Losses	Net gain/loss	Seats %	Votes %	Votes	+/−
Labour	15	0	11	-11	31.9	23.1	25,311	-8.5
Conservative	14	4	0	+4	29.8	27.9	30,572	+8
Liberal Democrats	12	5	1	+4	25.5	21.4	23,444	-5
Green	4	2	0	+2	8.5	14.9	16,286	+0.3
Independent	2	1	0	+1	4.3	6.1	6,715	+5.7

NB For wards with multiple seats, the total shown is for each party's highest-polling candidate.

==== By-elections ====
Labour Councillors Julie Gunnell and David Levene resigned in 2017 for personal reasons, their seats were retained by Labour candidates Jonny Crawshaw and Michael Pavlovic.

Hull Road Ward By-Election 8 June 2017
Party	Candidate	Votes	%	±%
Labour	Michael Pavlovic	3,408		
Conservative	Matt Freckelton	1,199		
Green	John Scobell Cossham	826		
Liberal Democrats	Alex Nowis	407		
Majority		2,209		
Turnout		5,876	56.8	
Labour hold		Swing		

Micklegate Ward By-Election 8 June 2017
Party	Candidate	Votes	%	±%
Labour	Jonny Crawshaw	3,772		
Green	Rosie Baker	1,581		
Conservative	Paul Healey	1,460		
Liberal Democrats	Aileen Alison Hingston	634		
Majority		2,191		
Turnout		7,468	75.5	
Labour hold		Swing		

Labour councillor and former Lord Mayor Sonja Crisp stepped down in 2018 due to ill health, her seat was retained by Labour candidate Kallum Taylor.

Holgate Ward By-Election 15 February 2018
Party	Candidate	Votes	%	±%
Labour	Kallum Mark Taylor	1,521	50.0	+22.6
Liberal Democrats	Emma Claire Keef	982	32.3	+19.5
Conservative	Joe Pattinson	334	11.0	−8.0
Green	Andreas Heinemeyer	203	6.7	−9.3
Majority		2,209		
Turnout		539	34	
Labour hold		Swing		

=== 2019-2023 ===
==== Local election ====
Local elections for City of York Council took place on 2 May 2019. Of the 47 seats contested, the Liberal Democrats won 21, Labour won 17, the Green Party won 4, independents won 3, and the Conservatives won 2. Following the election, the Liberal Democrats and Green Party formed a coalition.

York local election result 2019
Party	Candidates						Votes		
Party	Stood	Elected	Gained	Unseated	Net	% of total	%	No.	Net %
Liberal Democrats	47	21	9	0	+9	44.7	34.5	48,247	+10.6
Labour	47	17	2	0	+2	36.2	28.4	39,750	+2.8
Green	47	4	0	0	0	8.5	17.0	23,842	+1.4
Independent	10	3	2	1	+1	6.4	3.7	5,183	+0.3
Conservative	47	2	0	12	-12	4.3	15.5	21,707	-12.8
UKIP	2	0	0	0	0	0	0.5	662	-1.9
Women's Equality	1	0	0	0	0	0	0.3	389	N/A
Socialist Alternative	1	0	0	0	0	0	0.1	148	N/A

=== 2023-2027 ===
==== Local election ====
Local elections for City of York Council took place on 4 May 2023. Of the 47 seats contested, Labour won 24, the Liberal Democrats won 19, the Conservatives won 3, and independents won 1. Following the election, Labour formed a majority administration.

City of York Council
Party	Candidates						Votes		
Party	Stood	Elected	Gained	Unseated	Net	% of total	%	No.	Net %
Labour	47	24	7	0	▲7	51.1	42.4	55,995	+14.0
Liberal Democrats	47	19	1	3	▼2	40.4	31.1	41,080	–3.4
Conservative	45	3	2	1	▲1	6.4	13.8	18,191	–1.7
Independent	5	1	0	2	▼2	2.1	1.4	1,898	–2.3
Green	47	0	0	4	▼4	0.0	11.1	14,655	–5.9
Yorkshire	1	0	0	0	Steady	0.0	0.1	154	N/A
TUSC	1	0	0	0	Steady	0.0	0.1	141	N/A

==== By-elections ====
Labour Councillor Sophie Kelly resigned for personal reasons triggering a by-election in Hull Road Ward on Thursday, 4 July 2024, the same day as the 2024 United Kingdom general election. John Moroney retained the seat for Labour.

Hull Road Ward By-Election 4 July 2024
Party	Candidate	Votes	%	±%
Labour	John Moroney	1,203	38.5	
Liberal Democrats	Andrew Mortimer	1,008	32.2	
Green	Ben Ffrench	602	19.3	
Conservative	Ellis Holden	314	10.0	
Majority		195		
Turnout		3,127	36	
Labour hold		Swing		

Liberal Democrat councillor Ed Pearson resigned for personal reasons triggering a by-election in Haxby and Wigginton Ward on Thursday, 28 November 2024. Richard Watson retained the seat for the Liberal Democrats.

Haxby and Wigginton Ward By-Election 28 November 2024
Party	Candidate	Votes	%	±%
Liberal Democrats	Richard Watson	1,848	64.0	
Conservative	Jessie Secker	435	15.1	
Reform	John Crispin-Bailey	235	11.3	
Labour Co-op	James Flinders	203	7.0	
Green	Ian Lowson	76	2.6	
Majority		1,413		
Turnout		2,879	29.5	
Liberal Democrats hold		Swing		

Labour councillor Ben Burton resigned due to personal circumstances triggering a by-election in Heworth Ward on Thursday, 15 January 2026. Anna Perrett retained the seat for Labour.

Heworth Ward By-Election 15 January 2026
Party	Candidate	Votes	%	±%
Labour	Anna Perrett	1,096	36.7	
Reform	John Crispin-Bailey	601	20.1	
Green	Ben Ffrench	591	19.8	
Liberal Democrats	Ian Eiloart	528	17.7	
Conservative	Emma Dolben	118	4.0	
Independent	Emma Hardy	49	1.6	
Majority		495		
Turnout		2,983	31.6	
Labour hold		Swing		
