= 1994 York City Council election =

York City Council Election, 1994
← 1992	May 1994	1995 →

Fifteen seats to York City Council

The 1994 York City Council elections took place in May 1994 to elect the members of York City Council in North Yorkshire, England. These were the final elections to York City Council. Fifteen seats, previously contested in 1990, were up for election: twelve were won by the Labour Party, two by the Liberal Democrats and one by the Conservative Party.

== Election results ==
York local election results 1991
Party	Seats	Gains	Losses	Net gain/loss	Seats %	Votes %	Votes	+/−
Labour	12	0	1	▼1	-	53.2	-	-
Liberal Democrats	2	1	0	▲1	-	21.6	-	-
Conservative	1	0	0	0	-	23.5	-	-
Green	0	0	0	0	-	1.7	-	-

== Ward results ==
=== Acomb Ward ===
Acomb (1)
Party	Candidate	Votes	%	±%
Labour	D. Horton	1546	62.1	
Conservative	D. Carlton	598	24.0	
Liberal Democrats	M. Pack	344	13.8	
Turnout			47.0	
Labour hold		Swing		

=== Beckfield Ward ===
Beckfield (1)
Party	Candidate	Votes	%	±%
Labour	J. James	1365	56.3	
Conservative	S. Barton	648	26.7	
Liberal Democrats	N. Knight	412	17.0	
Turnout			45.6	
Labour hold		Swing		

=== Bishophill Ward ===
Bishophill (1)
Party	Candidate	Votes	%	±%
Labour	D. Merritt	1180	58.9	
Conservative	S. Mallett	488	24.4	
Liberal Democrats	G. Thompson	245	12.2	
Green	A. Chase	89	4.4	
Turnout			41.5	
Labour hold		Swing		

=== Bootham Ward ===
Bootham (1)
Party	Candidate	Votes	%	±%
Labour	K. King	1346	73.3	
Conservative	J. Cornish	251	13.7	
Liberal Democrats	D. Begbie	184	10.0	
Green	M. Nicholson	56	3.0	
Turnout			38.2	
Labour hold		Swing		

=== Clifton Ward ===
Clifton (1)
Party	Candidate	Votes	%	±%
Labour	A. Jones	1348	61.7	
Conservative	D. Gough	487	22.3	
Liberal Democrats	K. Tarry	285	13.0	
Green	N. Judd	65	3.0	
Turnout			43.8	
Labour hold		Swing		

=== Fishergate Ward ===
Fishergate (1)
Party	Candidate	Votes	%	±%
Labour	C. Haines	1463	53.8	
Conservative	R. Dickson	788	29.0	
Liberal Democrats	J. Fleetwood	293	10.8	
Green	S. Kenwright	177	6.5	
Turnout			47.1	
Labour hold		Swing		

=== Foxwood Ward ===
Foxwood (1)
Party	Candidate	Votes	%	±%
Liberal Democrats	A. Reid*	1910	69.6	
Labour	A. Campbell	560	20.4	
Conservative	J. Galvin	276	10.1	
Turnout			38.3	
Liberal Democrats hold		Swing		

=== Guildhall Ward ===
Guildhall (1)
Party	Candidate	Votes	%	±%
Labour	D. Smallwood	1311	59.9	
Conservative	A. Reeson	425	19.4	
Liberal Democrats	J. McCloy	316	14.4	
Green	A. Crawford	137	6.3	
Turnout			40.3	
Labour hold		Swing		

=== Heworth Ward ===
Heworth (1)
Party	Candidate	Votes	%	±%
Labour	B. Bell	1428	60.2	
Conservative	J. Crawshaw	514	21.7	
Liberal Democrats	P. Elgood	432	18.2	
Turnout			44.8	
Labour hold		Swing		

=== Holgate Ward ===
Holgate (1)
Party	Candidate	Votes	%	±%
Labour	A. Cowan	1196	53.8	
Conservative	E. Furby	586	26.4	
Liberal Democrats	D. Horwell	440	19.8	
Turnout			43.8	
Labour hold		Swing		

=== Knavesmire Ward ===
Knavesmire (1)
Party	Candidate	Votes	%	±%
Labour	M. Painter	1357	63.4	
Conservative	J. Heaps	504	23.6	
Liberal Democrats	R. Mayne	194	9.1	
Green	A. Hutcheon	84	3.9	
Turnout			42.6	
Labour hold		Swing		

=== Micklegate Ward ===
Micklegate (1)
Party	Candidate	Votes	%	±%
Conservative	G. Dean	1139	42.7	
Labour	E. Brookes	1022	38.3	
Liberal Democrats	R. Pitts	504	18.9	
Turnout			53.1	
Conservative hold		Swing		

=== Monk Ward ===
Monk (1)
Party	Candidate	Votes	%	±%
Labour	C. Stimson	1102	42.3	
Conservative	M. Foster	870	33.4	
Liberal Democrats	A. Normandale	633	24.3	
Turnout			51.5	
Labour hold		Swing		

=== Walmgate Ward ===
Walmgate (1)
Party	Candidate	Votes	%	±%
Labour	D. Wilde	1309	65.4	
Conservative	D. Thornton	408	20.4	
Liberal Democrats	J. Whitehouse	286	14.3	
Turnout			37.1	
Labour hold		Swing		

=== Westfield Ward ===
Westfield (1)
Party	Candidate	Votes	%	±%
Liberal Democrats	A. Waller	1059	46.2	
Labour	H. Perry	1026	44.8	
Conservative	A. Potter	205	9.0	
Turnout			49.1	
Liberal Democrats gain from Labour		Swing		
