= 1992 York City Council election =

York City Council Election, 1992
← 1991	May 1992	1994 →

Fifteen seats to York City Council
	First party	Second party	Third party
Party	Labour	Conservative	Liberal Democrats
Last election	34 seats, 44.5%	7 seats, 30.6%	4 seats, 19.9%
Seats won	11	3	1
Seats after	33	4	4
Seat change	▼1	▲1	Steady
Percentage	45.1%	38.1%	13.3%
Swing	▲0.6%	▲7.5%	▼6.6%

The 1992 York City Council elections were held in May 1992 to elect members of York City Council in North Yorkshire, England. Fifteen seats, previously contested in 1988, were up for election: eleven were won by the Labour Party, three by the Conservative Party and one by the Liberal Democrats. The Labour Party retained overall control of the council; the composition of the council after the election was: Labour Party 34 seats, Conservative Party seven seats and Liberal Democrats four seats.

== Election results ==
York local election results 1992
Party	Seats	Gains	Losses	Net gain/loss	Seats %	Votes %	Votes	+/−
Labour	11	0	1	▼1	-	45.1	-	-
Conservative	3	1	0	▲1	-	38.1	-	-
Liberal Democrats	1	0	0	0	-	13.3	-	-
Green	0	0	0	0	-	3.5	-	-

== Ward results ==
=== Acomb Ward ===
Acomb (1)
Party	Candidate	Votes	%	±%
Labour	B. Carradice	1160	51.6	
Conservative	J. Steel	878	39.1	
Liberal Democrats	G. Whitaker	157	7.0	
Green	H. Dunnett	53	2.4	
Turnout			40.2	
Labour hold		Swing		

=== Beckfield Ward ===
Beckfield (1)
Party	Candidate	Votes	%	±%
Conservative	J. Raper	1151	49.2	
Labour	M. Ross	1012	43.3	
Liberal Democrats	J. Dales	134	5.7	
Green	A. Hutcheon	42	1.8	
Turnout			43.8	
Conservative gain from Labour		Swing		

=== Bishophill Ward ===
Bishophill (1)
Party	Candidate	Votes	%	±%
Labour	M. Long	968	49.3	
Conservative	R. Atkinson	788	40.1	
Liberal Democrats	G. Thompson	124	6.3	
Green	E. Sourbut	83	4.2	
Turnout			37.8	
Labour hold		Swing		

=== Bootham Ward ===
Bootham (1)
Party	Candidate	Votes	%	±%
Labour	R. Hills	927	59.2	
Conservative	S. Thompson	447	28.5	
Liberal Democrats	D. Begbie	116	7.4	
Green	C. Everett	77	4.9	
Turnout			31.6	
Labour hold		Swing		

=== Clifton Ward ===
Clifton (1)
Party	Candidate	Votes	%	±%
Labour	D. Yellen	1134	55.0	
Conservative	A. Reeson	726	35.2	
Liberal Democrats	J. Telfer	138	6.7	
Green	M. Nicholson	65	3.2	
Turnout			38.3	
Labour hold		Swing		

=== Fishergate Ward ===
Fishergate (1)
Party	Candidate	Votes	%	±%
Labour	J. Boardman	1210	45.8	
Conservative	N. Heslop	1163	44.0	
Liberal Democrats	Mark Pack	155	5.9	
Green	A. Jenkins	116	4.4	
Turnout			44.6	
Labour hold		Swing		

=== Foxwood Ward ===
Foxwood (1)
Party	Candidate	Votes	%	±%
Liberal Democrats	A. Doig*	1465	57.9	
Labour	I. Robertson	572	22.6	
Conservative	N. Bartram	444	17.5	
Green	J. Forrester	51	2.0	
Turnout			34.8	
Liberal Democrats hold		Swing		

*In 1988, the seat was won by the SDP–Liberal Alliance. The members of the alliance, the Social Democratic Party (SDP) and the Liberal Party, merged in 1988 to become the Liberal Democrats.

=== Guildhall Ward ===
Guildhall (1)
Party	Candidate	Votes	%	±%
Labour	B. Watson	935	46.8	
Conservative	J. Butchard	718	35.9	
Green	H. Nightingale	197	9.9	
Liberal Democrats	A. Rothwell	148	7.4	
Turnout			34.1	
Labour hold		Swing		

=== Heworth Ward ===
Heworth (1)
Party	Candidate	Votes	%	±%
Labour	C. Waite	1294	52.9	
Conservative	K. Stanton	984	40.2	
Liberal Democrats	A. Normandale	127	5.2	
Green	J. Tapp	43	1.8	
Turnout			44.2	
Labour hold		Swing		

=== Holgate Ward ===
Holgate (1)
Party	Candidate	Votes	%	±%
Labour	R. Scrase	1076	53.2	
Conservative	M. Slater	745	36.9	
Liberal Democrats	D. Horwell	160	7.9	
Green	P. Ward	40	2.0	
Turnout			38.1	
Labour hold		Swing		

=== Knavesmire Ward ===
Knavesmire (1)
Party	Candidate	Votes	%	±%
Labour	R. Fletcher	1239	55.2	
Conservative	J. Heaps	851	37.9	
Green	A. Layram	153	6.8	
Turnout			42.1	
Labour hold		Swing		

=== Micklegate Ward ===
Micklegate (1)
Party	Candidate	Votes	%	±%
Conservative	C. Burnett	1253	50.6	
Labour	P. Hudson	766	30.9	
Liberal Democrats	A. Waller	405	16.4	
Green	C. Hustwayte	51	2.1	
Turnout			46.3	
Conservative hold		Swing		

=== Monk Ward ===
Monk (1)
Party	Candidate	Votes	%	±%
Conservative	S. Cook	1301	53.6	
Labour	O. Rochester	633	26.1	
Liberal Democrats	G. Riding	420	17.3	
Green	J. Cossham	74	3.0	
Turnout			45.9	
Conservative hold		Swing		

=== Walmgate Ward ===
Walmgate (1)
Party	Candidate	Votes	%	±%
Labour	C. Brown	949	52.7	
Conservative	P. Thompson	685	38.0	
Liberal Democrats	D. Makin	110	6.1	
Green	K. Hacker	57	3.2	
Turnout			32.3	
Labour hold		Swing		

=== Westfield Ward ===
Westfield (1)
Party	Candidate	Votes	%	±%
Labour	L. Thackeray*	963	45.5	
Liberal Democrats	D. Barker	724	34.2	
Conservative	T. Marks	393	18.6	
Green	J. Forrester	35	1.7	
Turnout			42.7	
Labour hold		Swing		

* In 1988, the seat was won by the SDP–Liberal Alliance. The members of the alliance, the Social Democratic Party (SDP) and the Liberal Party, merged in 1988 to become the Liberal Democrats.
