= 1979 York City Council election =

1979 English local election

← 1976	3 May 1979	1980 →

All 45 seats to York City Council 23 seats needed for a majority
- Turnout: 78.4%

	First party	Second party	Third party
Party	Conservative	Labour	Liberal
Seats won	23	13	9
Seat change	▼3	▲3	▲3
Popular vote	67,767	65,294	21,671
Percentage	43.7%	42.1%	14.0%
Council control before election
Conservative
Council control after election
Conservative

The 1979 York City Council election took place on 3 May 1979 to elect members of York City Council in North Yorkshire, England. This was on the same day as other local elections.

== Summary ==
=== Election result ===
1979 York City Council election
Party	Candidates	Seats	Gains	Losses	Net gain/loss	Seats %	Votes %	Votes	+/−
Conservative	43	23	1	6	▼3	51.1	43.7	67,767	
Labour	45	13	4	2	▲3	28.9	42.1	65,294	
Liberal	18	9	3	0	▲3	20.0	14.0	21,671	
Ind. Conservative	1	0	0	0	Steady	0.0	0.3	413	

== Ward results ==
=== Acomb ===
Acomb (3 seats)
Party	Candidate	Votes	%	±%
Conservative	E. Binner	1,771	42.0	
Labour	E. Roberts	1,703	40.4	
Labour	B. Watson	1,670	39.6	
Conservative	S. Bough	1,637	38.8	
Labour	A. Cryans	1,595	37.8	
Conservative	G. Knox	1,546	36.7	
Liberal	L. Doig	741	17.6	
Turnout		4,215	79.4	
Registered electors		5,308		
Conservative hold				
Labour gain from Conservative				
Labour gain from Conservative				

=== Beckfield ===
Beckfield (3 seats)
Party	Candidate	Votes	%	±%
Liberal	L. Marsh	1,715	40.5	
Liberal	K. Harper	1,362	32.1	
Liberal	K. Seymour	1,342	31.7	
Labour	B. Bell	1,296	30.6	
Labour	J. Battersby	1,235	29.1	
Conservative	D. Carlton	1,226	28.9	
Conservative	M. Ashley-Brown	1,207	28.5	
Labour	J. Southby	1,147	27.1	
Conservative	D. Evans	1,012	23.9	
Turnout		4,239	81.9	
Registered electors		5,176		
Liberal gain from Conservative				
Liberal gain from Conservative				
Liberal gain from Labour				

=== Bishophill ===
Bishophill (3 seats)
Party	Candidate	Votes	%	±%
Conservative	R. Buckle	1,391	34.5	
Conservative	R. Oxtoby	1,368	34.0	
Labour	R. Edwards	1,364	33.9	
Conservative	C. Oliver	1,320	32.8	
Labour	D. Merrett	1,313	32.6	
Labour	M. Penn	1,166	29.0	
Liberal	R. Leathley	861	21.4	
Ind. Conservative	G. Carpenter	413	10.3	
Turnout		4,027	83.6	
Registered electors		4,817		
Conservative win (new seat)				
Conservative win (new seat)				
Labour win (new seat)				

=== Bootham ===
Bootham (3 seats)
Party	Candidate	Votes	%	±%
Labour	K. Cooper	2,375	67.0	
Labour	A. Moody	2,079	58.7	
Labour	R. Hills	1,908	53.9	
Conservative	E. Thompson	1,166	32.9	
Conservative	A. Thompson	1,134	32.0	
Conservative	R. Weare	1,069	30.2	
Turnout		3,543	72.3	
Registered electors		4,900		
Labour hold				
Labour hold				
Labour hold				

=== Clifton ===
Clifton (3 seats)
Party	Candidate	Votes	%	±%
Labour	W. Richardson	2,002	47.3	
Conservative	P. Sadd	1,700	40.2	
Conservative	A. Bond	1,596	37.7	
Conservative	S. Stewart	1,535	36.3	
Labour	P. Hendry	1,497	35.4	
Labour	S. Whitehead	1,460	34.5	
Liberal	A. Garside	528	12.5	
Turnout		4,233	78.6	
Registered electors		5,385		
Labour hold				
Conservative gain from Labour				
Conservative hold				

=== Fishergate ===
Fishergate (3 seats)
Party	Candidate	Votes	%	±%
Conservative	M. Bwye	2,002	47.3	
Conservative	D. Thornton	1,992	47.1	
Conservative	A. Milling	1,761	41.6	
Labour	J. Hatfield	1,406	33.2	
Labour	D. Green	1,322	31.2	
Labour	M. Poulter	1,227	29.0	
Liberal	M. Gagen	587	13.9	
Turnout		3,994	75.7	
Registered electors		5,276		
Conservative hold				
Conservative hold				
Conservative hold				

=== Foxwood ===
Foxwood (3 seats)
Party	Candidate	Votes	%	±%
Liberal	S. Galloway	2,411	61.0	
Liberal	J. Dales	1,780	45.1	
Liberal	D. Horwell	1,678	42.5	
Conservative	M. Clarson	833	21.1	
Conservative	P. Higginson	829	21.0	
Conservative	T. Parkinson	796	20.2	
Labour	G. Henman	708	17.9	
Labour	D. Henman	678	17.2	
Labour	P. Mitchell	661	16.7	
Turnout		3,950	82.1	
Registered electors		4,811		
Liberal win (new seat)				
Liberal win (new seat)				
Liberal win (new seat)				

=== Guildhall ===
Guildhall (3 seats)
Party	Candidate	Votes	%	±%
Conservative	L. Grant	1,533	41.8	
Conservative	J. Yeomans	1,424	38.8	
Conservative	D. Nicolson	1,422	38.8	
Labour	M. Gladwin	1,369	37.3	
Labour	W. Macleod	1,233	33.6	
Labour	J. Maxwell	1,054	28.7	
Liberal	G. Stoney	768	20.9	
Turnout		3,669	71.6	
Registered electors		5,124		
Conservative hold				
Conservative hold				
Conservative hold				

=== Heworth ===
Heworth (3 seats)
Party	Candidate	Votes	%	±%
Conservative	K. Wood	2,153	50.7	
Conservative	J. Laverack	2,050	48.3	
Conservative	B. Savory	1,875	44.2	
Labour	C. Waite	1,470	34.6	
Labour	A. Cowen	1,466	34.5	
Labour	J. Juby	1,379	32.5	
Liberal	S. Barton	623	14.7	
Turnout		4,244	80.2	
Registered electors		5,292		
Conservative hold				
Conservative hold				
Conservative hold				

=== Holgate ===
Holgate (3 seats)
Party	Candidate	Votes	%	±%
Labour	J. Archer	2,135	48.0	
Labour	O. Hawxby	1,819	40.9	
Labour	R. Robinson	1,783	40.0	
Conservative	R. Garland	1,720	38.6	
Conservative	L. Daley	1,701	38.2	
Conservative	P. Chapman	1,619	36.4	
Liberal	M. Acomb	595	13.4	
Turnout		4,452	85.1	
Registered electors		5,232		
Labour hold				
Labour gain from Conservative				
Labour hold				

=== Knavesmire ===
Knavesmire (3 seats)
Party	Candidate	Votes	%	±%
Conservative	T. Hibbert	1,877	54.3	
Conservative	S. Brearley	1,743	50.4	
Conservative	C. Greaves	1,663	48.1	
Labour	G. Smith	1,584	45.8	
Labour	C. Hands	1,401	40.5	
Labour	M. Waite	1,400	40.5	
Turnout		3,459	70.8	
Registered electors		4,886		
Conservative hold				
Conservative hold				
Conservative hold				

=== Micklegate ===
Micklegate
Party	Candidate	Votes	%	±%
Conservative	J. Birch	2,114	47.1	
Conservative	G. Dean	2,040	45.5	
Conservative	P. Booth	1,930	43.0	
Labour	W. Atkinson	1,653	36.8	
Labour	W. Atkinson	1,429	31.8	
Labour	D. Busby	1,241	27.7	
Liberal	P. Hyde	722	16.1	
Turnout		4,487	85.8	
Registered electors		5,230		
Conservative hold				
Conservative hold				
Conservative hold				

=== Monk ===
Monk
Party	Candidate	Votes	%	±%
Conservative	J. Clout	2,211	53.8	
Conservative	C. Kay	2,133	51.9	
Conservative	M. Heppell	2,132	51.9	
Labour	C. Adams	1,358	33.1	
Labour	H. Adams	1,239	30.2	
Labour	S. Kirk	1,199	29.2	
Liberal	M. Harper	538	13.1	
Turnout		4,107	76.2	
Registered electors		5,390		
Conservative hold				
Conservative hold				
Conservative hold				

=== Walmgate ===
Walmgate
Party	Candidate	Votes	%	±%
Labour	F. Thistleton	2,028	54.6	
Labour	D. Wilde	2,021	54.5	
Labour	C. Vause	1,782	48.0	
Conservative	M. Bartram	1,685	45.4	
Conservative	P. Welch	1,498	40.4	
Conservative	J. Long	1,489	40.1	
Turnout		3,711	69.7	
Registered electors		5,325		
Labour hold				
Labour hold				
Labour gain from Conservative				

=== Westfield ===
Westfield
Party	Candidate	Votes	%	±%
Liberal	S. Galloway	2,074	49.6	
Liberal	C. Fairclough	1,805	43.2	
Liberal	M. Barker	1,541	36.8	
Labour	H. Bulmer	1,246	29.8	
Labour	P. Gales	1,195	28.6	
Labour	K. King	998	23.9	
Conservative	D. Craig	864	20.7	
Turnout		4,183	82.4	
Registered electors		5,077		
Liberal hold				
Liberal hold				
Liberal hold				
