= 1987 York City Council election =

1987 English local election

| ← 1986 | 7 May 1987 | 1988 → |

15 out of 45 seats to York City Council 23 seats needed for a majority
- Turnout: 52.7% (▲4.9%)

| | First party | Second party | Third party |
|---|---|---|---|
| Party | Labour | Conservative | Alliance |
| Last election | 26 seats, 43.1% | 12 seats, 30.9% | 7 seats, 25.4% |
| Seats won | 6 | 7 | 2 |
| Seats after | 26 | 12 | 7 |
| Seat change | Steady | Steady | Steady |
| Popular vote | 16,171 | 15,741 | 9,499 |
| Percentage | 38.7% | 37.7% | 22.8% |
| Swing | ▼4.4% | ▲6.8% | ▼2.6% |
- Winner of each seat at the 1987 York City Council election
Council control before election
Labour
Council control after election
Labour

The 1987 York City Council election took place on 7 May 1987 to elect members of York City Council in North Yorkshire, England. This was on the same day as other local elections.

== Summary ==
=== Election result ===
1987 York City Council election
| Party | This election | | | Full council | | | This election | | |
| Party | Seats | Net | Seats % | Other | Total | Total % | Votes | Votes % | +/− |
|---|---|---|---|---|---|---|---|---|---|
| Labour | 6 | Steady | 40.0 | 20 | 26 | 57.8 | 16,171 | 38.7 | –4.4 |
| Conservative | 7 | Steady | 46.7 | 5 | 12 | 26.7 | 15,741 | 37.7 | +6.8 |
| Alliance | 2 | Steady | 13.3 | 5 | 7 | 15.6 | 9,499 | 22.8 | –2.6 |
| Green | 0 | Steady | 0.0 | 0 | 0 | 0.0 | 330 | 0.8 | +0.3 |

== Ward results ==
=== Acomb ===
Acomb
| Party | Candidate | Votes | % | ±% |
|---|---|---|---|---|
| Labour | M. Bond | 1,183 | 43.3 | –3.8 |
| Conservative | I. Binner* | 1,103 | 40.4 | +8.5 |
| Alliance | B. Eales | 445 | 16.3 | –0.7 |
| Majority | | 80 | 2.9 | –12.3 |
| Turnout | | 2,731 | 51.6 | +3.1 |
| Registered electors | | 5,290 | | |
| Labour gain from Conservative | | Swing | ▼6.2 | |

=== Beckfield ===
Beckfield
| Party | Candidate | Votes | % | ±% |
|---|---|---|---|---|
| Conservative | P. Brown* | 1,470 | 49.2 | +14.3 |
| Labour | D. Roberts | 1,035 | 34.6 | –5.6 |
| Alliance | K. Harper | 485 | 16.2 | –8.7 |
| Majority | | 435 | 14.5 | N/A |
| Turnout | | 2,990 | 56.8 | +5.8 |
| Registered electors | | 5,264 | | |
| Conservative hold | | Swing | ▲10.0 | |

=== Bishophill ===
Bishophill
| Party | Candidate | Votes | % | ±% |
|---|---|---|---|---|
| Labour | C. Wallace | 1,105 | 46.7 | –6.0 |
| Conservative | R. Youngson | 892 | 37.7 | +6.3 |
| Alliance | J. Talbot | 370 | 15.6 | –0.3 |
| Majority | | 213 | 9.0 | –12.3 |
| Turnout | | 2,367 | 50.7 | +4.4 |
| Registered electors | | 4,668 | | |
| Labour hold | | Swing | ▼6.2 | |

=== Bootham ===
Bootham
| Party | Candidate | Votes | % | ±% |
|---|---|---|---|---|
| Labour | K. Cooper* | 1,424 | 63.5 | –2.2 |
| Conservative | A. Reeson | 573 | 25.5 | +5.1 |
| Alliance | J. Dales | 247 | 11.0 | –2.9 |
| Majority | | 851 | 37.9 | –7.4 |
| Turnout | | 2,244 | 43.8 | +2.5 |
| Registered electors | | 5,118 | | |
| Labour hold | | Swing | ▼3.7 | |

=== Clifton ===
Clifton
| Party | Candidate | Votes | % | ±% |
|---|---|---|---|---|
| Conservative | A. Bond | 1,191 | 43.0 | +5.9 |
| Labour | J. Cockerill | 1,168 | 42.2 | –2.7 |
| Alliance | S. Gildener | 410 | 14.8 | –3.2 |
| Majority | | 23 | 0.8 | N/A |
| Turnout | | 2,769 | 52.4 | +3.4 |
| Registered electors | | 5,288 | | |
| Conservative gain from Labour | | Swing | ▲4.3 | |

=== Fishergate ===
Fishergate
| Party | Candidate | Votes | % | ±% |
|---|---|---|---|---|
| Conservative | M. Bwye* | 1,287 | 44.0 | +5.2 |
| Labour | J. Bird | 1,172 | 40.1 | –5.5 |
| Alliance | V. Campbell | 464 | 15.9 | +0.3 |
| Majority | | 115 | 3.9 | N/A |
| Turnout | | 2,923 | 54.3 | +1.4 |
| Registered electors | | 5,379 | | |
| Conservative hold | | Swing | ▲5.4 | |

=== Foxwood ===
Foxwood
| Party | Candidate | Votes | % | ±% |
|---|---|---|---|---|
| Alliance | S. Galloway* | 1,934 | 60.6 | +0.7 |
| Conservative | D. Goldthorpe | 652 | 20.4 | +2.2 |
| Labour | B. Walker | 520 | 16.3 | –5.6 |
| Green | J. Forrester | 88 | 2.8 | N/A |
| Majority | | 1,282 | 40.1 | +2.1 |
| Turnout | | 3,194 | 48.2 | +6.5 |
| Registered electors | | 6,626 | | |
| Alliance hold | | Swing | ▼0.8 | |

=== Guildhall ===
Guildhall
| Party | Candidate | Votes | % | ±% |
|---|---|---|---|---|
| Labour | A. Moxon* | 1,305 | 48.2 | –1.0 |
| Conservative | E. Beavan | 990 | 36.5 | +3.4 |
| Alliance | P. Gildener | 415 | 15.3 | –2.4 |
| Majority | | 315 | 11.6 | –4.5 |
| Turnout | | 2,710 | 49.3 | +4.9 |
| Registered electors | | 5,499 | | |
| Labour hold | | Swing | ▼2.2 | |

=== Heworth ===
Heworth
| Party | Candidate | Votes | % | ±% |
|---|---|---|---|---|
| Conservative | K. Wood* | 1,307 | 44.7 | +14.4 |
| Labour | P. Kind | 1,159 | 39.7 | –0.9 |
| Alliance | N. McIlveen | 457 | 15.6 | –13.4 |
| Majority | | 148 | 5.1 | N/A |
| Turnout | | 2,923 | 55.1 | +2.4 |
| Registered electors | | 5,307 | | |
| Conservative hold | | Swing | ▲7.7 | |

=== Holgate ===
Holgate
| Party | Candidate | Votes | % | ±% |
|---|---|---|---|---|
| Labour | J. Archer* | 1,396 | 51.2 | –2.3 |
| Conservative | R. Dickson | 972 | 35.7 | +7.2 |
| Alliance | D. Wilson | 358 | 13.1 | –4.9 |
| Majority | | 424 | 15.6 | –9.3 |
| Turnout | | 2,726 | 51.9 | +7.3 |
| Registered electors | | 5,253 | | |
| Labour hold | | Swing | ▼4.8 | |

=== Knavesmire ===
Knavesmire
| Party | Candidate | Votes | % | ±% |
|---|---|---|---|---|
| Conservative | J. Hargrave* | 1,239 | 43.1 | +3.9 |
| Labour | V. Fry | 1,135 | 39.5 | –7.9 |
| Alliance | D. Hagyard | 355 | 12.4 | –0.9 |
| Green | J. McCallum | 145 | 5.0 | N/A |
| Majority | | 104 | 3.6 | N/A |
| Turnout | | 2,874 | 56.5 | +4.5 |
| Registered electors | | 5,086 | | |
| Conservative hold | | Swing | ▲5.9 | |

=== Micklegate ===
Micklegate
| Party | Candidate | Votes | % | ±% |
|---|---|---|---|---|
| Conservative | M. Bartram | 1,462 | 48.8 | +5.6 |
| Labour | R. Dick | 918 | 30.6 | +0.5 |
| Alliance | J. Hornsby | 520 | 17.4 | –9.3 |
| Green | R. Bell | 97 | 3.2 | N/A |
| Majority | | 544 | 18.2 | +5.1 |
| Turnout | | 2,997 | 58.2 | –0.5 |
| Registered electors | | 5,153 | | |
| Conservative hold | | Swing | ▲2.6 | |

=== Monk ===
Monk
| Party | Candidate | Votes | % | ±% |
|---|---|---|---|---|
| Conservative | J. Clout* | 1,395 | 44.3 | +12.2 |
| Alliance | A. Cormack | 1,138 | 36.2 | –0.5 |
| Labour | M. Iqbal | 613 | 19.5 | –11.7 |
| Majority | | 257 | 8.2 | N/A |
| Turnout | | 3,146 | 59.4 | +5.0 |
| Registered electors | | 5,297 | | |
| Conservative hold | | Swing | ▲6.4 | |

=== Walmgate ===
Walmgate
| Party | Candidate | Votes | % | ±% |
|---|---|---|---|---|
| Labour | F. Thistleton* | 1,134 | 46.5 | –5.2 |
| Conservative | D. Thornton | 857 | 35.1 | +8.8 |
| Alliance | J. Salmon | 449 | 18.4 | –0.2 |
| Majority | | 277 | 11.4 | –14.0 |
| Turnout | | 2,440 | 47.2 | +6.5 |
| Registered electors | | 5,174 | | |
| Labour hold | | Swing | ▼7.0 | |

=== Westfield ===
Westfield
| Party | Candidate | Votes | % | ±% |
|---|---|---|---|---|
| Alliance | S. Galloway* | 1,452 | 53.6 | +5.6 |
| Labour | C. Jackson | 904 | 33.4 | –4.4 |
| Conservative | A. Potter | 351 | 13.0 | +1.7 |
| Majority | | 548 | 20.2 | +8.5 |
| Turnout | | 2,707 | 55.9 | +6.7 |
| Registered electors | | 4,840 | | |
| Alliance hold | | Swing | ▲5.0 | |
