= 1991 York City Council election =

1991 English local election

← 1990	2 May 1991	1992 →

16 out of 45 seats to York City Council 23 seats needed for a majority
- Turnout: 49.1% (▼4.1%)

	First party	Second party	Third party
Party	Labour	Conservative	Liberal Democrats
Last election	31 seats, 53.7%	10 seats, 26.5%	4 seats, 12.9%
Seats won	10	3	3
Seats after	34	7	4
Seat change	▲3	▼3	Steady
Popular vote	18,876	13,000	8,456
Percentage	44.5%	30.6%	19.9%
Swing	▼9.2%	▲4.1%	▲7.0%
- Winner of each seat at the 1991 York City Council election
Council control before election
Labour
Council control after election
Labour

The 1991 York City Council election took place on 2 May 1991 to elect members of York City Council in North Yorkshire, England. This was on the same day as other local elections.

== Summary ==
=== Election result ===
1991 York City Council election
Party	This election			Full council			This election		
Party	Seats	Net	Seats %	Other	Total	Total %	Votes	Votes %	+/−
Labour	10	▲3	62.5	24	34	75.6	18,876	44.5	–9.2
Conservative	3	▼3	18.8	4	7	15.6	13,000	30.6	+4.1
Liberal Democrats	3	Steady	18.8	1	4	8.9	8,456	19.9	+7.0
Green	0	Steady	0.0	0	0	0.0	2,079	4.9	–2.1
Independent	0	Steady	0.0	0	0	0.0	36	0.1	N/A

== Ward results ==
=== Acomb ===
Acomb
Party	Candidate	Votes	%	±%
Labour	S. Cooke	1,527	55.9	–7.4
Conservative	J. Steel	833	30.5	+7.0
Liberal Democrats	D. Barker	285	10.4	+3.6
Green	H. Dunnett	86	3.1	–3.3
Majority		694	25.4	–14.4
Turnout		2,731	50.6	–3.5
Registered electors		5,392		
Labour hold		Swing	▼7.2	

=== Beckfield ===
Beckfield
Party	Candidate	Votes	%	±%
Conservative	P. Brown*	1,295	46.5	+5.7
Labour	G. Hodgson	1,182	42.5	–11.0
Liberal Democrats	P. Reid	218	7.8	+2.1
Green	C. Darley	87	3.1	N/A
Majority		113	4.1	N/A
Turnout		2,782	53.2	–4.9
Registered electors		5,233		
Conservative hold		Swing	▲8.4	

=== Bishophill ===
Bishophill
Party	Candidate	Votes	%	±%
Labour	C. Wallace*	1,115	49.6	–11.4
Conservative	C. Austin	757	33.6	+10.3
Liberal Democrats	J. McCloy	229	10.2	+3.9
Green	S. Kenwright	149	6.6	–2.8
Majority		358	15.9	–21.8
Turnout		2,250	47.9	–4.6
Registered electors		4,699		
Labour hold		Swing	▼10.9	

=== Bootham ===
Bootham
Party	Candidate	Votes	%	±%
Labour	K. Cooper*	1,339	66.6	–8.5
Conservative	J. Butchard	398	19.8	+8.1
Green	P. Shuker	194	9.7	+1.5
Liberal Democrats	G. Whitaker	79	3.9	–1.1
Majority		941	46.8	–16.5
Turnout		2,010	41.5	–4.4
Registered electors		4,839		
Labour hold		Swing	▼8.3	

=== Clifton ===
Clifton
Party	Candidate	Votes	%	±%
Labour	A. Curran	1,334	53.7	–10.9
Conservative	N. Heslop	850	34.2	+10.4
Liberal Democrats	J. Dales	231	9.3	+3.7
Green	G. Rawson	70	2.8	–3.2
Majority		484	19.5	–21.3
Turnout		2,485	48.1	–2.0
Registered electors		5,171		
Labour gain from Conservative		Swing	▼10.7	

=== Fishergate ===
Fishergate
Party	Candidate	Votes	%	±%
Labour	A. Boardman*	1,279	45.5	–7.0
Conservative	B. Kirkpatrick	1,047	37.3	+5.1
Liberal Democrats	G. Thompson	229	8.1	+3.1
Green	E. McIvor	219	7.8	–2.5
Independent	N. Stringfellow	36	1.3	N/A
Majority		232	8.3	–12.1
Turnout		2,810	50.9	–2.2
Registered electors		5,518		
Labour hold		Swing	▼6.1	

=== Foxwood ===
Foxwood (2 seats due to by-election)
Party	Candidate	Votes	%
Liberal Democrats	S. Galloway*	2,100	66.9
Liberal Democrats	A. Doig	1,888	60.2
Labour	W. Atkinson	616	19.6
Labour	F. Rudd	558	17.8
Conservative	M. Slater	457	14.6
Conservative	M. Foster	425	13.5
Green	J. Forrester	153	4.9
Green	G. Simpson	77	2.5
Turnout		3,138	44.6
Registered electors		7,035	
Liberal Democrats hold			
Liberal Democrats hold			

=== Guildhall ===
Guildhall
Party	Candidate	Votes	%	±%
Labour	D. Kirk	1,264	50.4	–0.7
Conservative	S. Cook	910	36.3	+2.1
Green	P. Jacques	334	13.3	+3.1
Majority		354	14.1	–2.8
Turnout		2,508	46.7	–4.4
Registered electors		5,376		
Labour hold		Swing	▼1.4	

=== Heworth ===
Heworth
Party	Candidate	Votes	%	±%
Labour	J. Clarke	1,481	51.9	–5.8
Conservative	K. Stanton	1,041	36.5	+8.8
Liberal Democrats	A. Normandale	252	8.8	+1.7
Green	J. Tapp	79	2.8	–4.8
Majority		440	15.4	–14.6
Turnout		2,853	53.8	–2.0
Registered electors		5,304		
Labour gain from Conservative		Swing	▼7.3	

=== Holgate ===
Holgate
Party	Candidate	Votes	%	±%
Labour	J. Archer*	1,418	57.5	–5.8
Conservative	A. Potter	710	28.8	+5.6
Liberal Democrats	D. Horwell	269	10.9	+3.4
Green	S. Treacher	71	2.9	–3.1
Majority		708	28.7	–11.4
Turnout		2,468	48.0	–3.3
Registered electors		5,137		
Labour hold		Swing	▼5.7	

=== Knavesmire ===
Knavesmire
Party	Candidate	Votes	%	±%
Labour	T. Walker	1,367	54.2	–5.4
Conservative	C. Burnett	877	34.8	+10.4
Liberal Democrats	P. Ward	146	5.8	–0.2
Green	H. Nightingale	132	5.2	–4.9
Majority		490	19.4	–15.8
Turnout		2,522	49.5	–6.8
Registered electors		5,097		
Labour gain from Conservative		Swing	▼7.9	

=== Micklegate ===
Micklegate
Party	Candidate	Votes	%	±%
Conservative	K. Beavan	1,418	45.3	+3.6
Labour	P. Hudson	1,076	34.4	–1.7
Liberal Democrats	A. Waller	523	16.7	–0.8
Green	A. Dunnett	110	3.5	–1.2
Majority		342	10.9	+5.2
Turnout		3,127	60.9	–1.6
Registered electors		5,133		
Conservative hold		Swing	▲2.7	

=== Monk ===
Monk
Party	Candidate	Votes	%	±%
Conservative	H. Divorty	1,127	40.8	+3.4
Labour	D. Kirk	933	33.8	–7.0
Liberal Democrats	G. Riding	566	20.5	+7.1
Green	J. Crossham	136	4.9	–3.5
Majority		194	7.0	N/A
Turnout		2,762	54.4	+0.1
Registered electors		5,077		
Conservative hold		Swing	▲5.2	

=== Walmgate ===
Walmgate
Party	Candidate	Votes	%	±%
Labour	F. Thistleton*	1,257	53.8	–10.3
Conservative	J. Raper	728	31.2	+4.7
Liberal Democrats	D. Makin	224	9.6	N/A
Green	K. Hacker	127	5.4	–3.9
Majority		529	22.6	–15.0
Turnout		2,336	43.6	–5.0
Registered electors		5,362		
Labour hold		Swing	▼7.5	

=== Westfield ===
Westfield
Party	Candidate	Votes	%	±%
Liberal Democrats	S. Galloway*	1,217	45.2	+12.5
Labour	M. Long	1,130	42.0	–7.2
Conservative	T. Marks	127	5.2	–5.1
Green	J. Davies	55	2.0	–0.3
Majority		87	3.2	N/A
Turnout		2,529	46.8	–13.8
Registered electors		5,754		
Liberal Democrats hold		Swing	▲9.9	
