= 1990 York City Council election =

1990 English local election

← 1988	3 May 1990	1991 →

15 out of 45 seats to York City Council 23 seats needed for a majority
- Turnout: 53.2% (▲3.6%)

	First party	Second party	Third party
Party	Labour	Conservative	Liberal Democrats
Last election	29 seats, 46.7%	10 seats, 38.3%	6 seats, 13.6%
Seats won	13	1	1
Seats after	31	10	4
Seat change	▲2	Steady	▼2
Popular vote	22,757	11,230	5,473
Percentage	53.7%	26.5%	12.9%
Swing	▲7.0%	▼11.8%	▼0.7%
- Winner of each seat at the 1990 York City Council election
Council control before election
Labour
Council control after election
Labour

The 1990 York City Council election took place on 3 May 1990 to elect members of York City Council in North Yorkshire, England. This was on the same day as other local elections.

== Summary ==
=== Election result ===
1990 York City Council election
Party	This election			Full council			This election		
Party	Seats	Net	Seats %	Other	Total	Total %	Votes	Votes %	+/−
Labour	13	▲2	86.7	18	31	68.9	22,757	53.7	+7.0
Conservative	1	Steady	6.7	9	10	22.2	11,230	26.5	–11.8
Liberal Democrats	1	▼2	6.7	3	4	8.9	5,473	12.9	–0.7
Green	0	Steady	0.0	0	0	0.0	2,954	7.0	+5.6

== Ward results ==
=== Acomb ===
Acomb
Party	Candidate	Votes	%	±%
Labour	D. Horton*	1,865	63.3	+4.9
Conservative	A. Potter	693	23.5	–8.6
Liberal Democrats	S. Adamson	199	6.8	–2.7
Green	H. Dunnett	188	6.4	N/A
Majority		1,172	39.8	+13.5
Turnout		2,945	54.1	+6.1
Registered electors		5,446		
Labour hold		Swing	▲7.8	

=== Beckfield ===
Beckfield
Party	Candidate	Votes	%	±%
Labour	J. James*	1,625	53.5	+6.1
Conservative	J. Lynch	1,240	40.8	–6.1
Liberal Democrats	S. Thurston	174	5.7	±0.0
Majority		385	12.7	+12.2
Turnout		3,039	58.1	+3.5
Registered electors		5,228		
Labour hold		Swing	▲6.1	

=== Bishophill ===
Bishophill
Party	Candidate	Votes	%	±%
Labour	D. Merrett*	1,513	61.0	+12.3
Conservative	C. Austin	579	23.3	–16.1
Green	E. Sourbut	233	9.4	+3.3
Liberal Democrats	D. Horwell	155	6.3	+1.0
Majority		934	37.7	+28.4
Turnout		2,480	52.5	+0.4
Registered electors		4,722		
Labour hold		Swing	▲14.2	

=== Bootham ===
Bootham
Party	Candidate	Votes	%	±%
Labour	K. King*	1,702	75.1	+8.1
Conservative	A. Reeson	266	11.7	–14.9
Green	P. Shuker	185	8.2	N/A
Liberal Democrats	J. Dales	114	5.0	–1.4
Majority		1,436	63.3	+22.9
Turnout		2,267	45.9	+5.1
Registered electors		4,944		
Labour hold		Swing	▲11.5	

=== Clifton ===
Clifton
Party	Candidate	Votes	%	±%
Labour	H. Perry*	1,678	64.6	+8.3
Conservative	P. Wheatley	618	23.8	–14.8
Green	G. Rawson	157	6.0	N/A
Liberal Democrats	J. McCloy	146	5.6	+0.4
Majority		1,060	40.8	+23.1
Turnout		2,599	50.1	–0.6
Registered electors		5,190		
Labour hold		Swing	▲11.6	

=== Fishergate ===
Fishergate
Party	Candidate	Votes	%	±%
Labour	C. Haines*	1,526	52.5	+2.4
Conservative	S. Cook	935	32.2	–10.4
Green	E. McIvor	298	10.3	N/A
Liberal Democrats	G. Thompson	145	5.0	–2.3
Majority		591	20.4	+12.9
Turnout		2,904	53.1	–0.3
Registered electors		5,473		
Labour hold		Swing	▲6.4	

=== Foxwood ===
Foxwood
Party	Candidate	Votes	%	±%
Liberal Democrats	A. Reid	1,850	57.5	+0.8
Labour	M. Iqbal	754	23.4	+6.5
Conservative	R. De Recourt Austin	393	12.2	–9.3
Green	J. Forrester	223	6.9	+2.0
Majority		1,096	34.0	–1.1
Turnout		3,220	46.0	+4.2
Registered electors		7,005		
Liberal Democrats hold		Swing	▼2.9	

=== Guildhall ===
Guildhall
Party	Candidate	Votes	%	±%
Labour	D. Smallwood	1,417	51.1	+3.2
Conservative	K. Beavan	948	34.2	–7.8
Green	M. Farran	283	10.2	N/A
Liberal Democrats	P. Doig	124	4.5	–5.6
Majority		469	16.9	+11.0
Turnout		2,772	51.1	+6.1
Registered electors		5,429		
Labour hold		Swing	▲5.5	

=== Heworth ===
Heworth
Party	Candidate	Votes	%	±%
Labour	B. Bell	1,740	57.7	+5.1
Conservative	N. Brown	836	27.7	–14.5
Green	J. Tapp	228	7.6	N/A
Liberal Democrats	A. Normandale	214	7.1	+1.8
Majority		904	30.0	+19.6
Turnout		3,018	55.8	–1.1
Registered electors		5,311		
Labour hold		Swing	▲9.8	

=== Holgate ===
Holgate
Party	Candidate	Votes	%	±%
Labour	A. Cowen*	1,705	63.3	+7.6
Conservative	G. White	625	23.2	–14.0
Liberal Democrats	P. Ward	202	7.5	+0.5
Green	S. Kenwright	161	6.0	N/A
Majority		1,080	40.1	+21.6
Turnout		2,693	51.3	+0.2
Registered electors		5,254		
Labour hold		Swing	▲10.8	

=== Knavesmire ===
Knavesmire
Party	Candidate	Votes	%	±%
Labour	M. Painter	1,700	59.6	+7.4
Conservative	N. Pinder	695	24.4	–16.4
Green	A. Layram	288	10.1	+6.0
Liberal Democrats	G. Robinson	170	6.0	+3.2
Majority		1,005	35.2	+23.8
Turnout		2,853	56.3	±0.0
Registered electors		5,070		
Labour hold		Swing	▲11.9	

=== Micklegate ===
Micklegate
Party	Candidate	Votes	%	±%
Conservative	G. Dean*	1,356	41.7	–12.0
Labour	P. Hudson	1,171	36.1	+3.1
Liberal Democrats	J. Nichol	567	17.5	+9.6
Green	A. Dunnett	154	4.7	–0.7
Majority		185	5.7	–15.0
Turnout		3,248	62.5	+11.2
Registered electors		5,194		
Conservative hold		Swing	▼7.6	

=== Monk ===
Monk
Party	Candidate	Votes	%	±%
Labour	S. Kirk	1,144	40.8	+15.4
Conservative	N. Bartram	1,047	37.4	–11.2
Liberal Democrats	G. Riding	376	13.4	–12.6
Green	J. Cossham	235	8.4	N/A
Majority		97	3.5	N/A
Turnout		2,802	54.3	+3.6
Registered electors		5,164		
Labour gain from Liberal Democrats		Swing	▲13.3	

=== Walmgate ===
Walmgate
Party	Candidate	Votes	%	±%
Labour	D. Wilde*	1,704	64.1	+12.8
Conservative	J. Raper	705	26.5	–14.0
Green	G. Thomas	248	9.3	N/A
Majority		999	37.6	+26.8
Turnout		2,657	48.6	+3.5
Registered electors		5,470		
Labour hold		Swing	▲13.4	

=== Westfield ===
Westfield
Party	Candidate	Votes	%	±%
Labour	J. Long	1,513	51.9	+7.4
Liberal Democrats	C. Fairclough*	1,037	35.6	–4.9
Conservative	T. Marks	294	10.1	–6.0
Green	J. Forrester	73	2.5	N/A
Majority		476	16.3	+11.1
Turnout		2,917	60.6	+11.1
Registered electors		4,816		
Labour gain from Liberal Democrats		Swing	▲5.6	
