= 1984 York City Council election =

1984 English local election

← 1983	3 May 1984	1986 →

15 out of 45 seats to York City Council 23 seats needed for a majority
- Turnout: 44.9% (▼3.6%)

	First party	Second party	Third party
Party	Labour	Conservative	Alliance
Last election	17 seats, 35.3%	18 seats, 37.3%	8 seats, 27.3%
Seats won	9	4	2
Seats after	19	18	8
Seat change	▲2	Steady	▼2
Popular vote	14,558	12,696	8,461
Percentage	40.8%	35.5%	23.7%
Swing	▲5.5%	▼1.8%	▼3.6%
- Winner of each seat at the 1984 York City Council election
Council control before election
No overall control
Council control after election
No overall control

The 1984 York City Council election took place on 3 May 1984 to elect members of York City Council in North Yorkshire, England. This was on the same day as other local elections.

== Summary ==
=== Election result ===
1984 York City Council election
Party	This election			Full council			This election		
Party	Seats	Net	Seats %	Other	Total	Total %	Votes	Votes %	+/−
Labour	9	▲2	60.0	10	19	42.2	14,558	40.8	+5.5
Conservative	4	Steady	26.7	14	18	40.0	12,696	35.5	–1.8
Alliance	2	▼2	13.3	6	8	17.8	8,461	23.7	–3.6

== Ward results ==
=== Acomb ===
Acomb
Party	Candidate	Votes	%	±%
Conservative	E. Witcombe	974	36.0	–6.4
Labour	B. Watson	966	35.7	+0.7
Alliance	L. Marsh	768	28.4	+5.8
Majority		8	0.3	–7.1
Turnout		2,708	51.0	+2.0
Registered electors		5,307		
Conservative gain from Labour		Swing	▼5.6	

=== Beckfield ===
Beckfield
Party	Candidate	Votes	%	±%
Labour	R. Pulleyn	907	36.5	+12.8
Conservative	D. Evans	906	36.4	–3.0
Alliance	C. Sherrard	674	27.1	–9.8
Majority		1	0.0	N/A
Turnout		2,487	46.2	–0.8
Registered electors		5,379		
Labour gain from Alliance		Swing	▲7.9	

=== Bishophill ===
Bishophill
Party	Candidate	Votes	%	±%
Labour	R. Edwards*	1,046	43.9	+3.8
Conservative	C. Greaves	804	33.8	–2.1
Alliance	J. Ives	531	22.3	–1.7
Majority		242	10.2	+6.0
Turnout		2,381	50.6	–1.1
Registered electors		4,709		
Labour hold		Swing	▲3.0	

=== Bootham ===
Bootham
Party	Candidate	Votes	%	±%
Labour	R. Hills*	1,333	65.5	–1.0
Conservative	A. Reeson	538	26.5	–1.3
Alliance	H. Jarvis	163	8.0	+2.3
Majority		795	39.1	+0.4
Turnout		2,034	38.9	–3.1
Registered electors		5,231		
Labour hold		Swing	▼0.2	

=== Clifton ===
Clifton
Party	Candidate	Votes	%	±%
Labour	S. Whitehead	1,104	45.1	–2.7
Conservative	D. Metcalfe	988	40.3	+1.9
Alliance	S. Gildener	358	14.6	+2.0
Majority		116	4.7	–4.7
Turnout		2,450	45.2	–2.3
Registered electors		5,405		
Labour hold		Swing	▼2.3	

=== Fishergate ===
Fishergate
Party	Candidate	Votes	%	±%
Conservative	J. Long*	1,069	47.3	–1.7
Labour	D. Smallwood	890	39.3	+6.8
Alliance	M. Lapper	303	13.4	–5.1
Majority		179	7.9	–8.6
Turnout		2,262	42.0	–4.7
Registered electors		5,383		
Conservative hold		Swing	▼4.3	

=== Foxwood ===
Foxwood
Party	Candidate	Votes	%	±%
Alliance	D. Horwell*	1,574	60.4	–4.9
Conservative	K. Cox	525	20.1	–2.0
Labour	M. McCarthy	508	19.5	+7.0
Majority		1,049	40.2	–3.0
Turnout		2,607	41.3	–8.7
Registered electors		6,307		
Alliance hold		Swing	▼1.5	

=== Guildhall ===
Guildhall
Party	Candidate	Votes	%	±%
Labour	P. Morrison	1,094	47.4	+8.3
Conservative	D. Nicholson*	865	37.5	–1.2
Alliance	A. Feinstein	347	15.0	–7.2
Majority		229	9.9	+9.5
Turnout		2,306	43.6	+1.6
Registered electors		5,292		
Labour gain from Conservative		Swing	▲4.8	

=== Heworth ===
Heworth
Party	Candidate	Votes	%	±%
Labour	C. Waite*	1,097	41.6	+9.6
Conservative	E. Walden	883	33.5	–5.4
Alliance	J. Morley	658	24.9	–4.2
Majority		214	8.1	N/A
Turnout		2,638	48.5	+1.0
Registered electors		5,329		
Labour hold		Swing	▲7.5	

=== Holgate ===
Holgate
Party	Candidate	Votes	%	±%
Labour	D. Parlabeam	1,152	48.3	+4.1
Conservative	L. Daley	938	39.3	–0.3
Alliance	K. Harper	296	12.4	–3.8
Majority		214	9.0	+4.4
Turnout		2,386	44.8	–2.7
Registered electors		5,329		
Labour hold		Swing	▲2.2	

=== Knavesmire ===
Knavesmire
Party	Candidate	Votes	%	±%
Labour	R. Fletcher	1,063	44.6	+14.7
Conservative	D. Dawson	916	38.4	+1.5
Alliance	D. Lickley	407	17.1	–16.1
Majority		147	6.2	N/A
Turnout		2,386	47.3	–5.6
Registered electors		5,049		
Labour gain from Alliance		Swing	▲6.6	

=== Micklegate ===
Micklegate
Party	Candidate	Votes	%	±%
Conservative	A. Milling	1,180	48.9	–5.3
Labour	W. Atkinson	832	34.5	+5.5
Alliance	V. Campbell	401	16.6	–0.2
Majority		348	14.4	–10.7
Turnout		2,413	45.9	–6.5
Registered electors		5,256		
Conservative hold		Swing	▼5.4	

=== Monk ===
Monk
Party	Candidate	Votes	%	±%
Conservative	M. Heppell*	1,126	47.4	–0.5
Labour	C. Adams	662	27.9	+1.7
Alliance	A. Jones	587	24.7	–1.1
Majority		464	19.5	–2.2
Turnout		2,375	45.6	–6.3
Registered electors		5,206		
Conservative hold		Swing	▼1.1	

=== Walmgate ===
Walmgate
Party	Candidate	Votes	%	±%
Labour	B. Bell*	1,036	54.0	–1.2
Conservative	M. Bulmer	629	32.8	–0.4
Alliance	D. Wilson	253	13.2	+1.6
Majority		407	21.2	–0.9
Turnout		1,918	36.3	–6.8
Registered electors		5,286		
Labour hold		Swing	▼0.4	

=== Westfield ===
Westfield
Party	Candidate	Votes	%	±%
Alliance	G. Robinson	1,141	48.3	–10.3
Labour	D. Horton	868	36.7	+8.9
Conservative	J. Fitzgerald	355	15.0	+1.4
Majority		273	11.5	–19.4
Turnout		2,364	47.4	–2.1
Registered electors		4,988		
Alliance hold		Swing	▼9.6	
