= 1995 City of York Council election =

1995 council election in York, England

City of York Council Election, 1995
- 4 May 1995

All 53 seats to City of York Council 27 seats needed for a majority
	First party	Second party
Leader	Rod Hills	Steve Galloway
Party	Labour	Liberal Democrats
Leader since	1984	1983
Leader's seat	Clifton	Foxwood
Seats won	30	18
Popular vote	53,972	34,891
Percentage	47.5%	30.7%
	Third party	Fourth party
Leader	Gerald Dean
Party	Conservative	Independent
Leader since	1990
Leader's seat	Micklegate (defeated)
Seats won	3	2
Popular vote	19,772	4,049
Percentage	17.4%	3.6%

Elections to the new City of York unitary authority were held on 4 May 1995, although the new unitary authority wasn't officially created until April 1996. All 53 council seats in the city were up for election and the Labour Party won overall control of the council.

Labour had controlled the 1973-1995 York City Council as a majority group since 1986 but following the creation of an expanded City of York unitary authority 22 councillors were returned to represent parished areas previously part of the more rural district council areas of Ryedale (14 councillors), Selby (6) and Harrogate (2). These areas were generally considered to be less fertile territory for Labour. The 15 former York City Council wards were unchanged for this election but each unitary ward elected two councillors, rather than three. The only exception was Foxwood Ward, which continued to return three councillors on the basis of population growth.

In the context of a nationwide disaster for the Conservative Party, Labour won all but four of the former York City Council wards (all four were held by the Liberal Democrats), including both seats in Micklegate, previously a safe Conservative ward. In the parished areas outside the former York city council boundary Labour won three seats (Fulford, Heslington and Copmanthorpe) and the Liberal Democrats won 14. The Conservatives were reduced to just three seats and two Independent councillors were also elected.

== Election result ==
City of York Council election 1995
Party	Candidates						Votes		
Party	Stood	Elected	Gained	Unseated	Net	% of total	%	No.	Net %
Labour	53	30				56.6%	47.5%	53,972	
Liberal Democrats	51	18				34.0%	30.7%	34,891	
Conservative	41	3				5.7%	17.4%	19,772	
Independent	13	2				3.8%	3.6%	4,049	
Green	6	0				0%	0.9%	1,021	

== Ward results ==
=== Acomb ward ===
Acomb
Party	Candidate	Votes	%
Labour	S Cooke *	1,587	35.5
Labour	D Horton †	1,586	35.5
Conservative	D Carlton ‡	470	10.5
Conservative	E Fulford	444	9.9
Liberal Democrats	M Pack	194	4.3
Liberal Democrats	P Reid	189	4.2
Turnout		4,470	43.0
Labour win (new seat)			
Labour win (new seat)			

* Represented the Acomb ward of York City Council, 1991-1996

† Represented the Acomb ward of York City Council, 1986-1996

‡ Represented the Beckfield ward of York City Council, 1976-1979, and the Beckfield division of North Yorkshire County Council, 1977-1981

=== Beckfield ward ===
Beckfield
Party	Candidate	Votes	%
Labour	R Cregan	1,566	34.4
Labour	J James *	1,476	32.5
Conservative	D Greaves	492	10.8
Conservative	M Slater	477	10.5
Liberal Democrats	J Diatta	295	6.5
Liberal Democrats	J Dales †	242	5.3
Turnout		4,548	45.1
Labour win (new seat)			
Labour win (new seat)			

* Represented the Beckfield ward of York City Council, 1986-1996

† Represented the Foxwood ward of York City Council, 1979-1983

=== Bishophill ward ===
Bishophill
Party	Candidate	Votes	%
Labour	D Merrett *	1,307	34.7
Labour	C Wallace †	1,178	31.3
Conservative	V Galvin	377	10.0
Conservative	H Steward	350	9.3
Green	A Chase	197	5.2
Liberal Democrats	D Grainger	186	4.9
Liberal Democrats	G Thompson	174	4.6
Turnout		3,769	40.5
Labour win (new seat)			
Labour win (new seat)			

* Represented the Bishophill ward of York City Council, 1982-1996

† Represented the Bishophill ward of York City Council, 1987-1996

=== Bootham ward ===
Bootham
Party	Candidate	Votes	%
Labour	K Cooper *	1,340	39.8
Labour	K King †	1,261	37.5
Conservative	A Reeson	206	6.1
Conservative	S Thompson	206	6.1
Liberal Democrats	D Begbie	193	5.7
Liberal Democrats	P Begbie	158	4.7
Turnout		3,364	36.2
Labour win (new seat)			
Labour win (new seat)			

* Represented the Bootham ward of York City Council, 1973-1996, and the Bootham division of North Yorkshire County Council, 1973-1996

† Represented the Bootham ward of York City Council, 1982-1996, and the Fishergate division of North Yorkshire County Council, 1985-1989

=== Clifton ward ===
Clifton
Party	Candidate	Votes	%
Labour	R Hills *	1,324	34.3
Labour	A Jones †	1,291	33.5
Conservative	L Daley ‡	427	11.1
Conservative	D Gough	388	10.1
Liberal Democrats	K Tarry	239	6.2
Liberal Democrats	G Foulger	188	4.9
Turnout		3,857	40.0
Labour win (new seat)			
Labour win (new seat)			

* Represented the Bootham ward of York City Council, 1979-1996, and the Clifton division of North Yorkshire County Council, 1981-1996

† Represented the Clifton ward of York City Council, 1994-1996

‡ Represented the Holgate ward of York City Council, 1976-1979, and the Holgate division of North Yorkshire County Council, 1977-1981

=== Clifton Without ward ===
The parish of Clifton Without

Clifton Without
Party	Candidate	Votes	%
Liberal Democrats	S Tarry *	609	47.5
Labour	P Duncan	599	46.8
Independent	E Wegener	73	5.7
Turnout		1,281	43.5
Liberal Democrats win (new seat)			

* Represented the Clifton Without ward of Ryedale District Council, 1991-1996

=== Copmanthorpe ward ===
The parishes of Acaster Malbis, Bishopthorpe, and Copmanthorpe

Copmanthorpe
Party	Candidate	Votes	%
Labour	P Guilfoyle	1,122	22.2
Conservative	A Armstrong *	934	18.4
Labour	N Wardman	824	16.3
Conservative	D Oswald	778	15.4
Liberal Democrats	G Hutton	524	10.3
Independent	D McSherry	464	9.2
Independent	C Parker	418	8.3
Turnout		5,064	43.9
Labour win (new seat)			
Conservative win (new seat)			

* Represented the Bishopthorpe ward of Selby District Council, 1987-1996, and the Bishopthorpe / Copmanthorpe division of North Yorkshire County Council, 1989-1996

=== Dunnington and Kexby ward ===
The parishes of Dunnington and Kexby

Dunnington and Kexby
Party	Candidate	Votes	%
Independent	R Carr *	706	58.1
Liberal Democrats	J Greenwood	192	15.8
Labour	L Findell	184	15.1
Independent	M Johnson †	133	10.9
Turnout		1,215	45.4
Independent win (new seat)			

* Represented the Dunnington ward of Selby District Council, 1979-1996

† Represented the Dunnington ward of Selby District Council, 1976-1996, and the Dunnington division of North Yorkshire County Council, 1985-1996

=== Fishergate ward ===
Fishergate
Party	Candidate	Votes	%
Labour	J Boardman *	1,560	31.4
Labour	R Farrington †	1,403	28.3
Conservative	R Dickson ‡	582	11.7
Conservative	J Ellerker	526	10.6
Liberal Democrats	L Fisher	252	5.1
Green	H Nightingale	228	4.6
Liberal Democrats	A Law	225	4.5
Green	A Hutcheon	185	3.7
Turnout		4,961	43.5
Labour win (new seat)			
Labour win (new seat)			

* Represented the Fishergate ward of York City Council, 1988-1996

† Represented the Fishergate division of North Yorkshire County Council, 1993-1996

‡ Represented the Fishergate division of North Yorkshire County Council, 1989-1993

=== Foxwood ward ===
Foxwood
Party	Candidate	Votes	%
Liberal Democrats	S Galloway *	1,831	22.8
Liberal Democrats	A Reid †	1,751	21.8
Liberal Democrats	C Cole	1,596	19.9
Labour	M Carter	717	8.9
Labour	A Curran ‡	677	8.4
Labour	R Thornton	582	7.2
Conservative	D Walton	238	3.0
Conservative	I Farndale	231	2.9
Conservative	J Galvin	230	2.9
Green	J Forrester	114	1.4
Independent	P Spence	62	0.8
Turnout		8,029	38.3
Liberal Democrats win (new seat)			
Liberal Democrats win (new seat)			
Liberal Democrats win (new seat)			

* Represented the Westfield ward of York City Council, 1973-1979, the Foxwood ward of York City Council, 1979-1996, the Westfield division of North Yorkshire County Council, 1973-1985, and the Foxwood division of North Yorkshire County Council, 1985-1996

† Represented the Foxwood ward of York City Council, 1990-1996

‡ Represented the Clifton ward of York City Council, 1991-1996

=== Fulford ward ===
The parish of Fulford

Fulford
Party	Candidate	Votes	%
Labour	T Brighton	496	48.2
Liberal Democrats	R Bileckyj	270	26.2
Independent	S Tuvey *	263	25.6
Turnout		1,029	46.4
Labour win (new seat)			

* Represented the Fulford ward of Selby District Council, 1987-1996

=== Guildhall ward ===
Guildhall
Party	Candidate	Votes	%
Labour	J Looker *	1,353	33.5
Labour	B Watson †	1,206	29.9
Conservative	R Garland	445	11.0
Conservative	J Cornish	432	10.7
Liberal Democrats	S McCloy	209	5.2
Liberal Democrats	J McCloy	199	4.9
Green	M Nicholson	195	4.8
Turnout		4,039	36.5
Labour win (new seat)			
Labour win (new seat)			

* Represented the Guildhall division of North Yorkshire County Council, 1985-1996

† Represented the Acomb ward of York City Council, 1979-1984, the Guildhall ward of York City Council, 1988-1996, and the Acomb division of North Yorkshire County Council, 1981-1989

=== Haxby ward ===
The parish of Haxby

Haxby
Party	Candidate	Votes	%
Liberal Democrats	H Briggs *	2,206	26.4
Liberal Democrats	A Carter †	2,172	26.0
Liberal Democrats	C Hogg ‡	2,090	25.0
Labour	P Newby	668	8.0
Labour	J Steele	605	7.2
Labour	A Campbell	604	7.2
Turnout		8,345	41.9
Liberal Democrats win (new seat)			
Liberal Democrats win (new seat)			
Liberal Democrats win (new seat)			

* Represented the Haxby North East ward of Ryedale District Council, 1991-1996, and the Haxby / Strensall division of North Yorkshire County Council, 1993-1996

† Represented the Haxby North East ward of Ryedale District Council, 1983-1996

‡ Represented the Haxby / Wigginton division of North Yorkshire County Council, 1993-1996

=== Heslington ward ===
The parish of Heslington

Heslington
Party	Candidate	Votes	%
Labour	M Brumby *	572	61.4
Independent	D Pearcy †	219	23.5
Independent	C Robertson	141	15.1
Turnout		932	32.5
Labour win (new seat)			

* Represented the Heslington ward of Selby District Council, 1991-1996

† Represented the Heslington ward of Selby District Council, 1973-1976

=== Heworth ward ===
Heworth
Party	Candidate	Votes	%
Labour	C Waite *	1,608	36.1
Labour	S Braund †	1,584	35.6
Conservative	E Walden	433	9.7
Conservative	G Watkinson	409	9.2
Liberal Democrats	R Alexander ‡	230	5.2
Liberal Democrats	D Hampton	189	4.2
Turnout		4,453	43.7
Labour win (new seat)			
Labour win (new seat)			

* Represented the Heworth ward of York City Council, 1980-1996

† Represented the Heworth division of North Yorkshire County Council, 1989-1993

‡ Represented the Huntington North ward of Ryedale District Council, 1987-1991, and the Huntington South ward of Ryedale District Council, 1991-1996

=== Heworth Without ward ===
The parish of Heworth Without

Heworth Without
Party	Candidate	Votes	%
Liberal Democrats	M Bradley *	787	71.0
Labour	G Colbeck	321	29.0
Turnout		1,108	56.4
Liberal Democrats win (new seat)			

* Represented the Heworth Without ward of Ryedale District Council, 1973-1983, and the Osbaldwick and Heworth ward of Ryedale District Council, 1983-1996

=== Holgate ward ===
Holgate
Party	Candidate	Votes	%
Labour	E Edge	1,472	34.3
Labour	R Scrase *	1,396	32.5
Conservative	D Wright	385	9.0
Conservative	T Porter	375	8.7
Liberal Democrats	D Horwell †	346	8.1
Liberal Democrats	S Horwell	317	7.4
Turnout		4,291	43.7
Labour win (new seat)			
Labour win (new seat)			

* Represented the Holgate ward of York City Council, 1992-1996

† Represented the Foxwood ward of York City Council, 1979-1988

=== Huntington and New Earswick ward ===
The parishes of Huntington and New Earswick

Huntington and New Earswick
Party	Candidate	Votes	%
Liberal Democrats	E Thomas *	2,077	21.1
Liberal Democrats	P Vaughan †	1,946	19.8
Liberal Democrats	S Reid ‡	1,910	19.4
Labour	T Horner	1,196	12.2
Labour	J Barklem §	1,158	11.8
Labour	M Sawyer	1,039	10.6
Independent	D Atlay	511	5.2
Turnout		9,837	41.0
Liberal Democrats win (new seat)			
Liberal Democrats win (new seat)			
Liberal Democrats win (new seat)			

* Represented the Huntington South ward of Ryedale District Council, 1983-1996

† Represented the Huntington North division of North Yorkshire County Council, 1993-1996

‡ Represented the New Earswick ward of Ryedale District Council, 1987-1991, and the Huntington South division of North Yorkshire County Council, 1985-1996

§ Represented the New Earswick ward of Ryedale District Council, 1991-1996

=== Knavesmire ward ===
Knavesmire
Party	Candidate	Votes	%
Labour	R Fletcher *	1,442	37.5
Labour	T Walker †	1,273	33.1
Conservative	D Dawson	403	10.5
Conservative	C Greaves ‡	399	10.4
Liberal Democrats	L Hogg	169	4.4
Liberal Democrats	R Mayne	162	4.2
Turnout		3,848	40.8
Labour win (new seat)			
Labour win (new seat)			

* Represented the Knavesmire ward of York City Council, 1984-1996

† Represented the Knavesmire ward of York City Council, 1991-1996

‡ Represented the Beckfield ward of York City Council, 1976-1979, and the Knavesmire ward of York City Council, 1979-1980

=== Micklegate ward ===
Micklegate
Party	Candidate	Votes	%
Labour	B Bell *	1,398	26.4
Labour	D Welsh	1,339	25.3
Conservative	G Dean †	1,050	19.8
Conservative	K Beavan ‡	943	17.8
Liberal Democrats	D Barker	303	5.7
Liberal Democrats	R Ormond §	258	4.9
Turnout		5,291	53.8
Labour win (new seat)			
Labour win (new seat)			

* Represented the Walmgate ward of York City Council, 1980-1988, and the Heworth ward of York City Council, 1990-1996

† Represented the Micklegate ward of York City Council, 1973-1996, and the Micklegate division of North Yorkshire County Council, 1993-1996

‡ Represented the Micklegate ward of York City Council, 1991-1996

§ Represented the Huntington North ward of Ryedale District Council, 1987-1996

=== Monk ward ===
Monk
Party	Candidate	Votes	%
Labour	P Dodd	1,404	27.0
Labour	V Kind	1,349	26.0
Conservative	J Clout *	878	16.9
Conservative	S Cook †	805	15.5
Liberal Democrats	J Kirby ‡	329	6.3
Liberal Democrats	A Normandale	329	6.3
Green	J Cossham	102	2.0
Turnout		5,196	48.8
Labour win (new seat)			
Labour win (new seat)			

* Represented the Monk ward of York City Council, 1973-1991, and the Monk division of North Yorkshire County Council, 1977-1996

† Represented the Monk ward of York City Council, 1992-1996

‡ Represented the Huntington South ward of Ryedale District Council, 1991-1996

=== Osbaldwick ward ===
The parish of Osbaldwick

Osbaldwick
Party	Candidate	Votes	%
Liberal Democrats	R Johnson *	523	46.0
Labour	H Perry †	476	41.8
Independent	P Smith	139	12.2
Turnout		1,138	48.5
Liberal Democrats win (new seat)			

* Represented the Osbaldwick and Heworth ward of Ryedale District Council, 1991-1996

† Represented the Clifton ward of York City Council, 1986-1994

=== Rawcliffe and Skelton ward ===
The parishes of Rawcliffe and Skelton

Rawcliffe and Skelton
Party	Candidate	Votes	%
Liberal Democrats	I Waudby *	762	19.2
Independent	R Eccles †	590	14.9
Labour	L Jenkins	566	14.2
Labour	P Goulding	534	13.4
Liberal Democrats	M Waudby	492	12.4
Conservative	A Sinclair	367	9.2
Conservative	N Sexton	331	8.3
Independent	M Kirk ‡	330	8.3
Turnout		3,972	42.5
Liberal Democrats win (new seat)			
Independent win (new seat)			

* Represented the Rawcliffe division of North Yorkshire County Council, 1989-1996

† Represented the Rawcliffe ward of Ryedale District Council, 1973-1996

‡ Represented the Skelton ward of Ryedale District Council, 1991-1996

=== Strensall ward ===
The parishes of Earswick, Holtby, Murton, Stockton-on-the-Forest, and Strensall with Towthorpe

Strensall
Party	Candidate	Votes	%
Liberal Democrats	A Fisher *	1,022	24.1
Liberal Democrats	J Vaughan †	903	21.3
Conservative	G Fettis	672	15.8
Conservative	M Foster	594	14.0
Labour	R Cundall	586	13.8
Labour	C Dickinson	468	11.0
Turnout		4,245	44.6
Liberal Democrats win (new seat)			
Liberal Democrats win (new seat)			

* Represented the Haxby West ward of Ryedale District Council, 1987-1996

† Represented the Huntington North ward of Ryedale District Council, 1991-1996

=== Upper Poppleton ward ===
The parishes of Askham Bryan, Askham Richard, Hessay, Nether Poppleton, Rufforth with Knapton, and Upper Poppleton

Upper Poppleton
Party	Candidate	Votes	%
Liberal Democrats	Q Macdonald	1,043	23.4
Conservative	G Moore	925	20.8
Conservative	P Brown *	895	20.1
Liberal Democrats	J Morley †	890	20.0
Labour	J Overhill-Smith	367	8.2
Labour	E Brookes	329	7.4
Turnout		4,449	54.4
Liberal Democrats win (new seat)			
Conservative win (new seat)			

* Represented the Beckfield ward of York City Council, 1983-1996, and the Derwent number 2 division of North Yorkshire County Council, 1981-1985

† Represented the Osbaldwick / Heworth division of North Yorkshire County Council, 1985-1996

=== Walmgate ward ===
Walmgate
Party	Candidate	Votes	%
Labour	D Wilde *	1,375	36.4
Labour	D Smallwood †	1,307	34.6
Conservative	J Heaps	338	8.9
Conservative	J Heaps	329	8.7
Liberal Democrats	P Hearn	224	5.9
Liberal Democrats	R Reed	208	5.5
Turnout		3,781	36.7
Labour win (new seat)			
Labour win (new seat)			

* Represented the Walmgate ward of York City Council, 1973-1996

† Represented the Guildhall ward of York City Council, 1990-1996, and the Walmgate division of North Yorkshire County Council, 1985-1996

=== Westfield ward ===
Westfield
Party	Candidate	Votes	%
Liberal Democrats	S Galloway *	1,182	25.4
Labour	B Carradice †	1,118	24.0
Labour	C Jackson	1,100	23.6
Liberal Democrats	A Waller ‡	976	21.0
Conservative	A Potter	145	3.1
Conservative	S Dennis	137	2.9
Turnout		4,658	51.5
Liberal Democrats win (new seat)			
Labour win (new seat)			

* Represented the Westfield ward of York City Council, 1979-1996, and the Westfield division of North Yorkshire County Council, 1993-1996

† Represented the Acomb ward of York City Council, 1988-1996

‡ Represented the Westfield ward of York City Council, 1994-1996

=== Wheldrake ward ===
The parishes of Deighton, Elvington, Naburn, and Wheldrake

Wheldrake
Party	Candidate	Votes	%
Conservative	G Hobson *	495	44.7
Labour	J Spooner †	420	37.9
Liberal Democrats	R Brown	192	17.3
Turnout		1,107	38.2
Conservative win (new seat)			

* Represented the Wheldrake with Elvington ward of Selby District Council, 1991-1996

† Represented the Heslington ward of Selby District Council, 1979-1987

=== Wigginton ward ===
The parish of Wigginton

Wigginton
Party	Candidate	Votes	%
Liberal Democrats	A Hall *	938	65.7
Labour	P Jenkins	259	18.1
Conservative	D Stuart	231	16.2
Turnout		1,428	47.7
Liberal Democrats win (new seat)			

* Represented the Haxby and Wigginton ward of Ryedale District Council, 1979-1987, and the Wigginton ward of Ryedale District Council, 1987-1996
