= 1980 York City Council election =

1980 English local election

← 1979	1 May 1980	1982 →

15 out of 45 seats to York City Council 23 seats needed for a majority
- Turnout: 44.5% (▼33.9%)

	First party	Second party	Third party
Party	Conservative	Labour	Liberal
Last election	23 seats, 43.7%	13 seats, 42.1%	9 seats, 14.0%
Seats won	4	7	4
Seats after	20	15	10
Seat change	▼3	▲2	▲1
Popular vote	12,283	14,255	8,211
Percentage	35.3%	41.0%	23.6%
Swing	▼8.4%	▼1.1%	▲9.6%
- Winner of each seat at the 1980 York City Council election
Council control before election
Conservative
Council control after election
No overall control

The 1980 York City Council election took place on 1 May 1980 to elect members of York City Council in North Yorkshire, England. This was on the same day as other local elections.

== Summary ==
=== Election result ===
1980 York City Council election
Party	This election			Full council			This election		
Party	Seats	Net	Seats %	Other	Total	Total %	Votes	Votes %	+/−
Conservative	4	▼3	26.7	16	20	44.4	12,283	35.3	–8.4
Labour	7	▲2	46.7	8	15	33.3	14,255	41.0	–1.1
Liberal	4	▲1	26.7	6	10	22.2	8,211	23.6	+9.6
Communist	0	Steady	0.0	0	0	0.0	27	0.1	N/A

== Ward results ==
=== Acomb ===
Acomb
Party	Candidate	Votes	%	±%
Labour	B. Watson*	1,070	45.6	+5.2
Conservative	G. Knox	951	40.5	–1.5
Liberal	R. Pratt	326	13.9	–3.7
Majority		119	5.1	N/A
Turnout		2,347	44.0	–35.4
Registered electors		5,337		
Labour hold		Swing	▲3.4	

=== Beckfield ===
Beckfield
Party	Candidate	Votes	%	±%
Liberal	S. Barton	961	38.1	–2.4
Labour	A. Cowan	888	35.2	+4.6
Conservative	D. Carlton	676	26.8	–2.1
Majority		73	2.9	N/A
Turnout		2,525	48.4	–33.5
Registered electors		5,220		
Liberal hold		Swing	▼3.5	

=== Bishophill ===
Bishophill
Party	Candidate	Votes	%	±%
Labour	R. Edwards*	812	35.2	+1.3
Liberal	J. Cummins	790	34.2	+12.8
Conservative	M. Ashley-Brown	705	30.6	–3.9
Majority		22	1.0	N/A
Turnout		2,307	48.0	–35.6
Registered electors		4,803		
Labour hold		Swing	▼5.8	

=== Bootham ===
Bootham
Party	Candidate	Votes	%	±%
Labour	R. Hills*	1,395	69.7	+2.6
Conservative	K. Harris	471	23.5	–9.4
Liberal	D. Hancock	135	6.7	N/A
Majority		924	46.2	N/A
Turnout		2,001	38.7	–33.6
Registered electors		5,175		
Labour hold		Swing	▲6.0	

=== Clifton ===
Clifton
Party	Candidate	Votes	%	±%
Labour	P. Hendry	1,097	45.6	–1.7
Conservative	A. Bond*	1,052	43.7	+3.5
Liberal	A. Garside	258	10.7	–1.8
Majority		45	1.9	N/A
Turnout		2,407	44.5	–34.1
Registered electors		5,405		
Labour gain from Conservative		Swing	▼2.6	

=== Fishergate ===
Fishergate
Party	Candidate	Votes	%	±%
Conservative	J. Long	1,051	50.7	+0.6
Labour	A. Cryans	850	41.0	+5.8
Liberal	M. Gagen	174	8.4	–6.3
Majority		201	9.7	N/A
Turnout		2,075	38.8	–36.9
Registered electors		5,349		
Conservative hold		Swing	▼2.6	

=== Foxwood ===
Foxwood
Party	Candidate	Votes	%	±%
Liberal	D. Horwell*	1,531	62.5	+1.5
Labour	D. Horton	482	19.7	+1.8
Conservative	M. Murphy	437	17.8	–3.3
Majority		1,049	42.8	N/A
Turnout		2,450	46.9	–35.2
Registered electors		5,222		
Liberal hold		Swing	▼0.2	

=== Guildhall ===
Guildhall
Party	Candidate	Votes	%	±%
Conservative	D. Nicolson*	759	36.5	–5.3
Labour	M. Gladwin	717	34.5	–2.8
Liberal	R. North	602	29.0	+8.1
Majority		42	2.0	N/A
Turnout		2,078	41.3	–30.3
Registered electors		5,033		
Conservative hold		Swing	▼1.3	

=== Heworth ===
Heworth
Party	Candidate	Votes	%	±%
Labour	C. Waite	1,100	47.7	+13.1
Conservative	B. Savory*	1,025	44.4	–6.3
Liberal	W. Moore	156	6.8	–7.9
Communist	P. Evans	27	1.2	N/A
Majority		75	3.2	N/A
Turnout		2,308	43.4	–36.8
Registered electors		5,314		
Labour gain from Conservative		Swing	▲9.7	

=== Holgate ===
Holgate
Party	Candidate	Votes	%	±%
Labour	R. Robinson*	1,216	45.6	–2.4
Conservative	L. Daley	906	34.0	–4.7
Liberal	I. Auckland	546	20.5	+7.1
Majority		310	11.6	N/A
Turnout		2,668	50.3	–34.8
Registered electors		5,309		
Labour hold		Swing	▲1.2	

=== Knavesmire ===
Knavesmire
Party	Candidate	Votes	%	±%
Liberal	A. Lister	1,043	40.8	N/A
Conservative	C. Greaves*	793	31.0	–23.2
Labour	G. Smith	723	28.3	–17.5
Majority		250	9.8	N/A
Turnout		2,559	51.7	–19.1
Registered electors		4,945		
Liberal gain from Conservative				

=== Micklegate ===
Micklegate
Party	Candidate	Votes	%	±%
Conservative	P. Booth*	1,132	47.3	+0.2
Labour	J. Battersby	1,024	42.8	+6.0
Liberal	R. Woodward	238	9.9	–6.2
Majority		108	4.5	N/A
Turnout		2,394	45.2	–40.6
Registered electors		5,293		
Conservative hold		Swing	▼2.9	

=== Monk ===
Monk
Party	Candidate	Votes	%	±%
Conservative	M. Heppell*	1,188	56.3	+2.5
Labour	C. Adams	749	35.5	+2.4
Liberal	M. Harper	174	8.2	–4.9
Majority		439	20.8	N/A
Turnout		2,111	40.3	–35.9
Registered electors		5,235		
Conservative hold		Swing	▲0.1	

=== Walmgate ===
Walmgate
Party	Candidate	Votes	%	±%
Labour	B. Bell	1,153	55.5	+0.9
Conservative	M. Bartram	790	38.0	–7.4
Liberal	P. Thomas	136	6.5	N/A
Majority		363	17.5	N/A
Turnout		2,079	38.8	–30.9
Registered electors		5,355		
Labour hold		Swing	▲4.2	

=== Westfield ===
Westfield
Party	Candidate	Votes	%	±%
Liberal	M. Barker*	1,141	46.3	–3.3
Labour	K. King	979	39.7	+9.9
Conservative	S. Green	347	14.1	–6.6
Majority		162	6.6	N/A
Turnout		2,467	48.3	–34.1
Registered electors		5,105		
Liberal hold		Swing	▼6.6	
