= 1983 York City Council election =

1983 English local election

← 1982	5 May 1983	1984 →

15 out of 45 seats to York City Council 23 seats needed for a majority
- Turnout: 48.5% (▲3.6%)

	First party	Second party	Third party
Party	Conservative	Labour	Alliance
Last election	19 seats, 36.1%	15 seats, 31.4%	10 seats, 32.5%
Seats won	7	6	2
Seats after	18	17	10
Seat change	▼1	▲2	▼1
Popular vote	14,352	13,569	10,509
Percentage	37.3%	35.3%	27.3%
Swing	▲1.2%	▲3.9%	▼5.2%
- Winner of each seat at the 1983 York City Council election
Council control before election
No overall control
Council control after election
No overall control

The 1983 York City Council election took place on 5 May 1983 to elect members of York City Council in North Yorkshire, England. This was on the same day as other local elections.

== Summary ==
=== Election result ===
1983 York City Council election
Party	This election			Full council			This election		
Party	Seats	Net	Seats %	Other	Total	Total %	Votes	Votes %	+/−
Conservative	7	▼1	46.7	11	18	40.0	14,352	37.3	+1.2
Labour	6	▲2	40.0	11	17	37.8	13,569	35.3	+3.9
Alliance	2	▼1	13.3	8	10	22.2	10,509	27.3	–5.2
Residents	0	Steady	0.0	0	0	0.0	32	0.1	N/A

== Ward results ==
=== Acomb ===
Acomb
Party	Candidate	Votes	%	±%
Conservative	E. Binner*	1,112	42.4	+7.5
Labour	D. Horton	919	35.0	+2.8
Alliance	D. Crayke	594	22.6	–10.3
Majority		193	7.4	+5.4
Turnout		2,625	49.0	+4.2
Registered electors		5,354		
Conservative hold		Swing	▲2.4	

=== Beckfield ===
Beckfield
Party	Candidate	Votes	%	±%
Conservative	P. Brown	993	39.4	+8.7
Alliance	L. Marsh*	931	36.9	–5.2
Labour	S. Whitehead	599	23.7	–3.5
Majority		62	2.5	N/A
Turnout		2,523	47.0	+5.1
Registered electors		5,373		
Conservative gain from Alliance		Swing	▲7.0	

=== Bishophill ===
Bishophill
Party	Candidate	Votes	%	±%
Labour	S. Haines	963	40.1	+3.2
Conservative	P. Buckle*	861	35.9	+2.2
Alliance	J. Ives	577	24.0	–5.4
Majority		102	4.2	+1.0
Turnout		2,401	51.7	+6.0
Registered electors		4,647		
Labour gain from Conservative		Swing	▲0.5	

=== Bootham ===
Bootham
Party	Candidate	Votes	%	±%
Labour	K. Cooper*	1,446	66.5	+12.0
Conservative	A. Reeson	605	27.8	+5.8
Alliance	R. Moss	124	5.7	–17.8
Majority		841	38.7	+7.7
Turnout		2,175	42.0	+0.2
Registered electors		5,177		
Labour hold		Swing	▲3.1	

=== Clifton ===
Clifton
Party	Candidate	Votes	%	±%
Labour	W. Richardson*	1,241	47.8	+10.2
Conservative	D. Dawson	996	38.4	–4.4
Alliance	M. Lapper	327	12.6	–6.9
Residents	K. Chapman	32	1.2	N/A
Majority		245	9.4	N/A
Turnout		2,596	47.5	+4.1
Registered electors		5,462		
Labour hold		Swing	▲7.3	

=== Fishergate ===
Fishergate
Party	Candidate	Votes	%	±%
Conservative	M. Bwye*	1,240	49.0	–1.0
Labour	D. Smallwood	823	32.5	+4.8
Alliance	A. Jones	468	18.5	–3.9
Majority		417	16.5	–5.8
Turnout		2,531	46.7	+2.0
Registered electors		5,435		
Conservative hold		Swing	▼2.9	

=== Foxwood ===
Foxwood
Party	Candidate	Votes	%	±%
Alliance	S. Galloway*	1,927	65.3	+11.3
Conservative	R. Youngson	652	22.1	–5.9
Labour	J. Hill	370	12.5	–5.4
Majority		1,275	43.2	+17.2
Turnout		2,949	50.0	+4.0
Registered electors		5,901		
Alliance hold		Swing	▲8.6	

=== Guildhall ===
Guildhall
Party	Candidate	Votes	%	±%
Labour	A. Moxon	867	39.1	+7.5
Conservative	J. Gilles	858	38.7	–2.6
Alliance	J. Morley	491	22.2	–4.9
Majority		9	0.4	N/A
Turnout		2,216	42.0	+1.0
Registered electors		5,279		
Labour gain from Conservative		Swing	▲5.1	

=== Heworth ===
Heworth
Party	Candidate	Votes	%	±%
Conservative	K. Wood*	1,171	38.9	+3.4
Labour	C. Haines	962	32.0	+0.3
Alliance	V. Moore	875	29.1	–3.7
Majority		209	6.9	+4.2
Turnout		3,008	47.5	–0.2
Registered electors		5,450		
Conservative hold		Swing	▲1.6	

=== Holgate ===
Holgate
Party	Candidate	Votes	%	±%
Labour	J. Archer*	1,120	44.2	+5.4
Conservative	L. Daley	1,003	39.6	+3.6
Alliance	D. Barker	409	16.2	–9.0
Majority		117	4.6	+1.9
Turnout		2,532	47.5	+2.7
Registered electors		5,345		
Labour hold		Swing	▲0.9	

=== Knavesmire ===
Knavesmire
Party	Candidate	Votes	%	±%
Conservative	J. Hargrave	975	36.9	–1.1
Alliance	J. Rookes	876	33.2	–4.8
Labour	K. Cooke	790	29.9	+5.9
Majority		99	3.7	N/A
Turnout		2,641	52.9	+11.4
Registered electors		4,994		
Conservative hold		Swing	▲1.7	

=== Micklegate ===
Micklegate
Party	Candidate	Votes	%	±%
Conservative	J. Birch*	1,482	54.2	+3.5
Labour	B. Atkinson	794	29.0	+7.7
Alliance	C. Hawes	460	16.8	–11.2
Majority		688	25.1	+2.4
Turnout		2,736	52.4	–1.4
Registered electors		5,224		
Conservative hold		Swing	▼4.2	

=== Monk ===
Monk
Party	Candidate	Votes	%	±%
Conservative	J. Clout*	1,305	47.9	+0.1
Labour	C. Adams	715	26.2	+6.3
Alliance	A. Moon	704	25.8	–6.5
Majority		590	21.7	+6.2
Turnout		2,724	51.9	+2.7
Registered electors		5,253		
Conservative hold		Swing	▼3.1	

=== Walmgate ===
Walmgate
Party	Candidate	Votes	%	±%
Labour	F. Thistleton*	1,258	55.2	+11.8
Conservative	V. Berends	755	33.2	–1.0
Alliance	P. Thomas	264	11.6	–10.8
Majority		503	22.1	+12.9
Turnout		2,277	43.1	+0.1
Registered electors		5,283		
Labour hold		Swing	▲6.4	

=== Westfield ===
Westfield
Party	Candidate	Votes	%	±%
Alliance	S. Galloway*	1,482	58.6	+0.1
Labour	R. Pulleyn	702	27.8	–3.5
Conservative	M. Bulmer	344	13.6	+3.4
Majority		780	30.9	+3.8
Turnout		2,528	49.5	+5.0
Registered electors		5,048		
Alliance hold		Swing	▲1.8	
