= 1986 York City Council election =

1986 English local election

← 1984	8 May 1986	1987 →

15 out of 45 seats to York City Council 23 seats needed for a majority
- Turnout: 47.8% (▲2.9%)

	First party	Second party	Third party
Party	Labour	Conservative	Alliance
Last election	19 seats, 40.8%	18 seats, 35.5%	8 seats, 23.7%
Seats won	11	1	3
Seats after	26	12	7
Seat change	▲7	▼6	▼1
Popular vote	16,474	11,806	9,725
Percentage	43.1%	30.9%	25.4%
Swing	▲2.3%	▼4.6%	▲1.7%
- Winner of each seat at the 1986 York City Council election
Council control before election
No overall control
Council control after election
Labour

The 1986 York City Council election took place on 8 May 1986 to elect members of York City Council in North Yorkshire, England. This was on the same day as other local elections.

== Summary ==
=== Election result ===
1986 York City Council election
Party	This election			Full council			This election		
Party	Seats	Net	Seats %	Other	Total	Total %	Votes	Votes %	+/−
Labour	11	▲7	73.3	15	26	57.8	16,474	43.1	+2.3
Conservative	1	▼6	6.7	11	12	26.7	11,806	30.9	–4.6
Alliance	3	▼1	20.0	4	7	15.6	9,725	25.4	+1.7
Green	0	Steady	0.0	0	0	0.0	174	0.5	N/A
Independent	0	Steady	0.0	0	0	0.0	36	0.1	N/A

== Ward results ==
=== Acomb ===
Acomb
Party	Candidate	Votes	%	±%
Labour	D. Horton	1,194	47.1	+11.4
Conservative	R. Flacher	809	31.9	–4.1
Alliance	M. Brookes	431	17.0	–11.4
Green	A. Dunnett	102	4.0	N/A
Majority		385	15.2	N/A
Turnout		2,536	48.5	–2.5
Registered electors		5,309		
Labour gain from Conservative		Swing	▲7.8	

=== Beckfield ===
Beckfield
Party	Candidate	Votes	%	±%
Labour	J. James	1,070	40.2	+3.7
Conservative	J. Lynch	929	34.9	–1.5
Alliance	R. Anderson*	663	24.9	–2.2
Majority		141	5.3	+5.3
Turnout		2,662	51.0	+4.8
Registered electors		5,277		
Labour gain from Alliance		Swing	▲2.6	

=== Bishophill ===
Bishophill
Party	Candidate	Votes	%	±%
Labour	D. Merrett*	1,135	52.7	+8.8
Conservative	D. Alexander	677	31.4	–2.4
Alliance	J. Agar	342	15.9	–6.4
Majority		458	21.3	+11.1
Turnout		2,154	46.3	–4.3
Registered electors		4,686		
Labour hold		Swing	▲5.6	

=== Bootham ===
Bootham
Party	Candidate	Votes	%	±%
Labour	K. King*	1,404	65.7	+0.2
Conservative	L. Cross	436	20.4	–6.1
Alliance	M. Gagen	297	13.9	+5.9
Majority		968	45.3	+6.2
Turnout		2,137	41.3	+2.4
Registered electors		5,221		
Labour hold		Swing	▲3.2	

=== Clifton ===
Clifton
Party	Candidate	Votes	%	±%
Labour	H. Perry	1,166	44.9	–0.2
Conservative	A. Bond*	963	37.1	–3.2
Alliance	S. Gildener	467	18.0	+3.4
Majority		203	7.8	+3.1
Turnout		2,596	49.0	+3.8
Registered electors		5,368		
Labour gain from Conservative		Swing	▲1.5	

=== Fishergate ===
Fishergate
Party	Candidate	Votes	%	±%
Labour	C. Haines	1,275	45.6	+6.3
Conservative	D. Thornton*	1,085	38.8	–8.5
Alliance	T. Emmans	437	15.6	+2.2
Majority		190	6.8	N/A
Turnout		2,797	52.9	+10.9
Registered electors		5,355		
Labour gain from Conservative		Swing	▲7.4	

=== Foxwood ===
Foxwood
Party	Candidate	Votes	%	±%
Alliance	S. Auckland*	1,635	59.9	–0.5
Labour	B. Walker	598	21.9	+2.4
Conservative	R. Youngson	496	18.2	–1.9
Majority		1,037	38.0	–2.2
Turnout		2,729	41.7	+0.4
Registered electors		6,641		
Alliance hold		Swing	▼1.5	

=== Guildhall ===
Guildhall
Party	Candidate	Votes	%	±%
Labour	P. McIvor	1,191	49.2	+1.8
Conservative	J. Yeomans*	802	33.1	–4.4
Alliance	M. Reynolds	429	17.7	+2.7
Majority		389	16.1	+6.2
Turnout		2,422	44.4	+0.8
Registered electors		5,500		
Labour gain from Conservative		Swing	▲3.1	

=== Heworth ===
Heworth
Party	Candidate	Votes	%	±%
Labour	M. Sherwood	1,148	40.6	–1.0
Conservative	M. Bartram*	857	30.3	–3.2
Alliance	L. Marsh	820	29.0	+4.1
Majority		291	10.3	+2.2
Turnout		2,825	52.7	+4.2
Registered electors		5,415		
Labour gain from Conservative		Swing	▲1.1	

=== Holgate ===
Holgate
Party	Candidate	Votes	%	±%
Labour	A. Cowen*	1,252	53.5	+5.2
Conservative	J. Bevan	668	28.5	–10.8
Alliance	M. Cole	421	18.0	+5.6
Majority		584	24.9	+15.9
Turnout		2,341	44.6	–0.2
Registered electors		5,305		
Labour hold		Swing	▲8.0	

=== Knavesmire ===
Knavesmire
Party	Candidate	Votes	%	±%
Labour	P. Roxburgh	1,232	47.4	+2.8
Conservative	L. Hargrave	1,019	39.2	+0.8
Alliance	B. Eales	346	13.3	–3.8
Majority		213	8.2	+2.0
Turnout		2,597	52.0	+4.7
Registered electors		4,996		
Labour gain from Alliance		Swing	▲1.0	

=== Micklegate ===
Micklegate
Party	Candidate	Votes	%	±%
Conservative	G. Dean*	1,316	43.2	–5.7
Labour	R. Dick	917	30.1	–4.4
Alliance	D. Makin	814	26.7	+10.1
Majority		399	13.1	–1.3
Turnout		3,047	58.7	+12.8
Registered electors		5,247		
Conservative hold		Swing	▼0.7	

=== Monk ===
Monk
Party	Candidate	Votes	%	±%
Alliance	W. Rich	1,050	36.7	+12.0
Conservative	W. Robinson	920	32.1	–15.3
Labour	P. Kind	893	31.2	+3.3
Majority		130	4.5	N/A
Turnout		2,863	54.4	+8.8
Registered electors		5,330		
Alliance gain from Conservative		Swing	▲13.7	

=== Walmgate ===
Walmgate
Party	Candidate	Votes	%	±%
Labour	D. Wilde*	1,098	51.7	–2.3
Conservative	P. Thompson	559	26.3	–6.5
Alliance	R. Reed	394	18.6	+5.4
Green	W. Castle	72	3.4	N/A
Majority		539	25.4	+4.2
Turnout		2,123	40.7	+4.4
Registered electors		5,299		
Labour hold		Swing	▲2.1	

=== Westfield ===
Westfield
Party	Candidate	Votes	%	±%
Alliance	C. Fairclough*	1,179	49.4	+1.1
Labour	C. Jackson	901	37.8	+1.1
Conservative	A. Potter	270	11.3	–3.7
Independent	G. Gaunt	36	1.5	N/A
Majority		278	11.7	±0.0
Turnout		2,386	49.2	+1.8
Registered electors		4,918		
Alliance hold		Swing	0.0	
