= 1988 York City Council election =

1988 English local election

← 1987	5 May 1988	1990 →

15 out of 45 seats to York City Council 23 seats needed for a majority
- Turnout: 49.6% (▼3.1%)

	First party	Second party	Third party
Party	Labour	Conservative	SLD
Last election	26 seats, 38.7%	12 seats, 37.7%	7 seats, 22.8%
Seats won	12	2	1
Seats after	29	10	6
Seat change	▲3	▼2	▼1
Popular vote	18,639	15,262	5,428
Percentage	46.7%	38.3%	13.6%
Swing	▲8.0%	▲0.6%	▼9.2%
- Winner of each seat at the 1988 York City Council election
Council control before election
Labour
Council control after election
Labour

The 1988 York City Council election took place on 5 May 1988 to elect members of York City Council in North Yorkshire, England. This was on the same day as other local elections.

== Summary ==
=== Election result ===
1988 York City Council election
Party	This election			Full council			This election		
Party	Seats	Net	Seats %	Other	Total	Total %	Votes	Votes %	+/−
Labour	12	▲3	80.0	17	29	64.4	18,639	46.7	+8.0
Conservative	2	▼2	13.3	8	10	22.2	15,262	38.3	+0.6
SLD	1	▼1	6.7	5	6	13.3	5,428	13.6	–9.2
Green	0	Steady	0.0	0	0	0.0	557	1.4	+0.6
Independent	0	Steady	0.0	0	0	0.0	13	<0.1	N/A

== Ward results ==
=== Acomb ===
Acomb
Party	Candidate	Votes	%	±%
Labour	B. Carradice	1,541	58.4	+15.1
Conservative	R. Fischer	848	32.1	–8.3
SLD	A. Downs	251	9.5	–6.8
Majority		693	26.3	+23.4
Turnout		2,640	48.0	–3.6
Registered electors		5,499		
Labour gain from Conservative		Swing	▲11.7	

=== Beckfield ===
Beckfield
Party	Candidate	Votes	%	±%
Labour	R. Pulleyn*	1,368	47.4	+12.8
Conservative	J. Lynch	1,353	46.9	–2.3
SLD	C. Horwell	164	5.7	–10.5
Majority		15	0.5	N/A
Turnout		2,885	54.6	–2.2
Registered electors		5,288		
Labour hold		Swing	▲7.6	

=== Bishophill ===
Bishophill
Party	Candidate	Votes	%	±%
Labour	R. Van Gogh	1,187	48.7	+2.0
Conservative	W. Burn	960	39.4	+1.7
Green	J. McCallum	149	6.1	N/A
SLD	G. Robinson	130	5.3	–10.3
Independent	C. Cooke	13	0.5	N/A
Majority		227	9.3	+0.3
Turnout		2,439	52.1	+1.4
Registered electors		4,679		
Labour hold		Swing	▲0.2	

=== Bootham ===
Bootham
Party	Candidate	Votes	%	±%
Labour	R. Hills*	1,385	67.0	+3.5
Conservative	J. Wheatley	550	26.6	+1.1
SLD	J. Dales	133	6.4	–4.6
Majority		835	40.4	+2.5
Turnout		2,068	40.8	–3.0
Registered electors		5,063		
Labour hold		Swing	▲1.2	

=== Clifton ===
Clifton
Party	Candidate	Votes	%	±%
Labour	S. Whitehead*	1,503	56.3	+14.1
Conservative	S. Barton	1,031	38.6	–4.4
SLD	P. Begbie	138	5.2	–9.6
Majority		472	17.7	N/A
Turnout		2,672	50.7	–1.7
Registered electors		5,274		
Labour hold		Swing	▲9.3	

=== Fishergate ===
Fishergate
Party	Candidate	Votes	%	±%
Labour	J. Boardman	1,465	50.1	+10.0
Conservative	J. Long*	1,246	42.6	–1.4
SLD	V. Campbell	212	7.3	–8.6
Majority		219	7.5	N/A
Turnout		2,923	53.4	–0.9
Registered electors		5,475		
Labour gain from Conservative		Swing	▲5.7	

=== Foxwood ===
Foxwood
Party	Candidate	Votes	%	±%
SLD	G. Horwell*	1,653	56.7	–3.9
Conservative	I. Farndale	628	21.5	+1.1
Labour	B. Kirk	493	16.9	+0.6
Green	J. Forrester	143	4.9	+2.1
Majority		1,025	35.1	–5.0
Turnout		2,917	41.8	–6.4
Registered electors		6,975		
SLD hold		Swing	▼2.5	

=== Guildhall ===
Guildhall
Party	Candidate	Votes	%	±%
Labour	B. Watson	1,192	47.9	–0.3
Conservative	K. Beavan	1,046	42.0	+5.5
SLD	L. Marsh	251	10.1	–5.2
Majority		146	5.9	–5.7
Turnout		2,489	45.0	–4.3
Registered electors		5,528		
Labour hold		Swing	▼2.9	

=== Heworth ===
Heworth
Party	Candidate	Votes	%	±%
Labour	C. Waite*	1,591	52.6	+12.9
Conservative	N. Brown	1,277	42.2	–2.5
SLD	D. Wilson	159	5.3	–10.3
Majority		314	10.4	N/A
Turnout		3,027	56.9	+1.8
Registered electors		5,321		
Labour hold		Swing	▲7.7	

=== Holgate ===
Holgate
Party	Candidate	Votes	%	±%
Labour	J. Southby	1,519	55.7	+4.5
Conservative	R. Dickson	1,014	37.2	+1.5
SLD	J. Nicholson	192	7.0	–6.1
Majority		503	18.5	+2.9
Turnout		2,725	51.1	–0.8
Registered electors		5,332		
Labour hold		Swing	▲1.5	

=== Knavesmire ===
Knavesmire
Party	Candidate	Votes	%	±%
Labour	R. Fletcher*	1,502	52.2	+12.7
Conservative	L. Halgrave	1,174	40.8	–2.3
Green	A. Layram	119	4.1	–0.9
SLD	J. Abel	81	2.8	–9.6
Majority		328	11.4	N/A
Turnout		2,876	56.3	–0.2
Registered electors		5,105		
Labour hold		Swing	▲7.5	

=== Micklegate ===
Micklegate
Party	Candidate	Votes	%	±%
Conservative	A. Milling*	1,466	53.7	+4.9
Labour	K. Allott	901	33.0	+2.4
SLD	P. Doig	215	7.9	–9.5
Green	R. Bell	146	5.4	+2.2
Majority		565	20.7	+2.5
Turnout		2,728	51.3	–6.9
Registered electors		5,317		
Conservative hold		Swing	▲1.3	

=== Monk ===
Monk
Party	Candidate	Votes	%	±%
Conservative	M. Heppell*	1,307	48.6	+4.3
SLD	A. Cormack	700	26.0	–10.2
Labour	D. Kirk	685	25.4	+5.9
Majority		607	22.5	+14.3
Turnout		2,692	50.7	–8.7
Registered electors		5,314		
Conservative hold		Swing	▲7.3	

=== Walmgate ===
Walmgate
Party	Candidate	Votes	%	±%
Labour	C. Brown	1,229	51.3	+4.8
Conservative	D. Thornton	971	40.5	+5.4
SLD	J. Salmon	196	8.2	–10.2
Majority		258	10.8	–0.6
Turnout		2,396	45.1	–2.1
Registered electors		5,316		
Labour hold		Swing	▼0.3	

=== Westfield ===
Westfield
Party	Candidate	Votes	%	±%
Labour	R. Penston	1,078	44.5	+11.1
SLD	P. Ward	953	40.5	–14.3
Conservative	L. Daley	391	16.1	+3.1
Majority		125	5.2	N/A
Turnout		2,422	49.5	–6.4
Registered electors		4,897		
Labour gain from SLD		Swing	▲12.7	
