= 1982 York City Council election =

1982 English local election

← 1980	6 May 1982	1983 →

15 out of 45 seats to York City Council 23 seats needed for a majority
- Turnout: 44.9% (▲0.4%)

	First party	Second party	Third party
Party	Conservative	Labour	Alliance
Last election	20 seats, 35.3	15 seats, 41.0%	10 seats, 23.6%
Seats won	7	4	4
Seats after	19	15	11
Seat change	▼1	Steady	▲1
Popular vote	12,716	11,051	11,466
Percentage	36.1%	31.4%	32.5%
Swing	▲0.8%	▼9.6%	▲8.9%
- Winner of each seat at the 1982 York City Council election
Council control before election
No overall control
Council control after election
No overall control

The 1982 York City Council election took place on 6 May 1982 to elect members of York City Council in North Yorkshire, England. This was on the same day as other local elections.

== Summary ==
=== Election result ===
1982 York City Council election
Party	This election			Full council			This election		
Party	Seats	Net	Seats %	Other	Total	Total %	Votes	Votes %	+/−
Conservative	7	▼1	46.7	12	19	42.2	12,716	36.1	+0.8
Labour	4	Steady	26.7	11	15	33.3	11,051	31.4	–9.6
Alliance	4	▲1	26.7	7	11	24.4	11,466	32.5	+8.9

== Ward results ==
=== Acomb ===
Acomb
Party	Candidate	Votes	%	±%
Conservative	R. Fischer	836	34.9	–5.6
Alliance	A. Garside	789	32.9	+19.0
Labour	A. Cryans	772	32.2	–13.4
Majority		47	2.0	N/A
Turnout		2,397	44.8	+0.8
Registered electors		5,353		
Conservative gain from Labour		Swing	▼12.3	

=== Beckfield ===
Beckfield
Party	Candidate	Votes	%	±%
Alliance	R. Anderson	945	42.1	+4.0
Conservative	N. Bottom	688	30.7	+3.9
Labour	B. Hardaker	610	27.2	–8.0
Majority		257	11.5	+8.6
Turnout		2,243	41.9	–6.5
Registered electors		5,356		
Alliance hold		Swing	▲0.1	

=== Bishophill ===
Bishophill
Party	Candidate	Votes	%	±%
Labour	D. Merrett	794	36.9	+1.7
Conservative	J. Gilles	725	33.7	+3.1
Alliance	C. Jones	634	29.4	–4.8
Majority		69	3.2	+2.2
Turnout		2,153	45.7	–2.3
Registered electors		4,711		
Labour gain from Conservative		Swing	▼0.7	

=== Bootham ===
Bootham
Party	Candidate	Votes	%	±%
Labour	K. King	1,174	54.5	–15.2
Alliance	A. Moody*	507	23.5	+16.8
Conservative	A. Reeson	474	22.0	–1.5
Majority		667	31.0	–15.2
Turnout		2,155	41.8	+3.1
Registered electors		5,160		
Labour hold		Swing	▼16.0	

=== Clifton ===
Clifton
Party	Candidate	Votes	%	±%
Conservative	A. Bond	1,005	42.8	–0.9
Labour	S. Whitehead	883	37.6	–8.0
Alliance	P. Gales	458	19.5	+8.8
Majority		122	5.2	N/A
Turnout		2,346	43.4	–1.1
Registered electors		5,409		
Conservative hold		Swing	▲3.6	

=== Fishergate ===
Fishergate
Party	Candidate	Votes	%	±%
Conservative	D. Thornton*	1,205	50.0	–0.7
Labour	K. Cooke	667	27.7	–13.3
Alliance	A. Jones	539	22.4	+14.0
Majority		538	22.3	+12.6
Turnout		2,411	44.7	+5.9
Registered electors		5,390		
Conservative hold		Swing	▲6.3	

=== Foxwood ===
Foxwood
Party	Candidate	Votes	%	±%
Alliance	S. Auckland	1,356	54.0	–8.5
Conservative	R. Youngson	703	28.0	+10.2
Labour	D. Horton	450	17.9	–1.8
Majority		653	26.0	–16.8
Turnout		2,509	46.0	–0.9
Registered electors		5,454		
Alliance hold		Swing	▼9.4	

=== Guildhall ===
Guildhall
Party	Candidate	Votes	%	±%
Conservative	J. Yeomans*	878	41.3	+4.8
Labour	C. Haines	672	31.6	–2.9
Alliance	P. Doig	576	27.1	–1.9
Majority		206	9.7	+7.7
Turnout		2,126	41.0	–0.3
Registered electors		5,183		
Conservative hold		Swing	▲3.9	

=== Heworth ===
Heworth
Party	Candidate	Votes	%	±%
Conservative	M. Bartram	917	35.5	–8.9
Alliance	W. Moore	847	32.8	+26.0
Labour	D. Smallwood	820	31.7	–16.0
Majority		70	2.7	N/A
Turnout		2,584	47.7	+4.3
Registered electors		5,422		
Conservative hold		Swing	▼17.5	

=== Holgate ===
Holgate
Party	Candidate	Votes	%	±%
Labour	A. Cowen	920	38.8	–6.8
Conservative	L. Daley	855	36.0	+2.0
Alliance	M. Pennington-George	597	25.2	+4.7
Majority		65	2.7	–8.9
Turnout		2,372	44.8	–5.5
Registered electors		5,294		
Labour hold		Swing	▼4.4	

=== Knavesmire ===
Knavesmire
Party	Candidate	Votes	%	±%
Alliance	A. Havering	789	38.0	–2.8
Conservative	C. Greaves	788	38.0	+7.0
Labour	S. Haines	499	24.0	–4.3
Majority		1	0.0	–9.8
Turnout		2,076	41.5	–10.2
Registered electors		5,005		
Alliance gain from Conservative		Swing	▼4.9	

=== Micklegate ===
Micklegate
Party	Candidate	Votes	%	±%
Conservative	G. Dean*	1,406	50.7	+3.4
Alliance	A. Ives	777	28.0	+18.1
Labour	W. Atkinson	590	21.3	–21.5
Majority		629	22.7	+18.2
Turnout		2,773	53.8	+8.6
Registered electors		5,155		
Conservative hold		Swing	▼7.4	

=== Monk ===
Monk
Party	Candidate	Votes	%	±%
Conservative	C. Kay*	1,229	47.8	–8.5
Alliance	A. Hilder	830	32.3	+24.1
Labour	C. Adams	510	19.9	–15.6
Majority		399	15.5	–5.3
Turnout		2,569	49.2	+8.9
Registered electors		5,219		
Conservative hold		Swing	▼16.3	

=== Walmgate ===
Walmgate
Party	Candidate	Votes	%	±%
Labour	D. Wilde*	986	43.4	–12.1
Conservative	J. Hargrave	778	34.2	–3.8
Alliance	P. Thomas	508	22.4	+15.9
Majority		208	9.2	–8.3
Turnout		2,272	43.0	+4.2
Registered electors		5,281		
Labour hold		Swing	▼4.2	

=== Westfield ===
Westfield
Party	Candidate	Votes	%	±%
Alliance	C. Fairclough*	1,314	58.5	+12.2
Labour	R. Pulleyn	704	31.3	–8.4
Conservative	M. Murphy	229	10.2	–3.9
Majority		610	27.1	+20.5
Turnout		2,247	44.5	–3.8
Registered electors		5,044		
Alliance hold		Swing	▲10.3	
