= 14 The Shambles =

Listed building in York, England

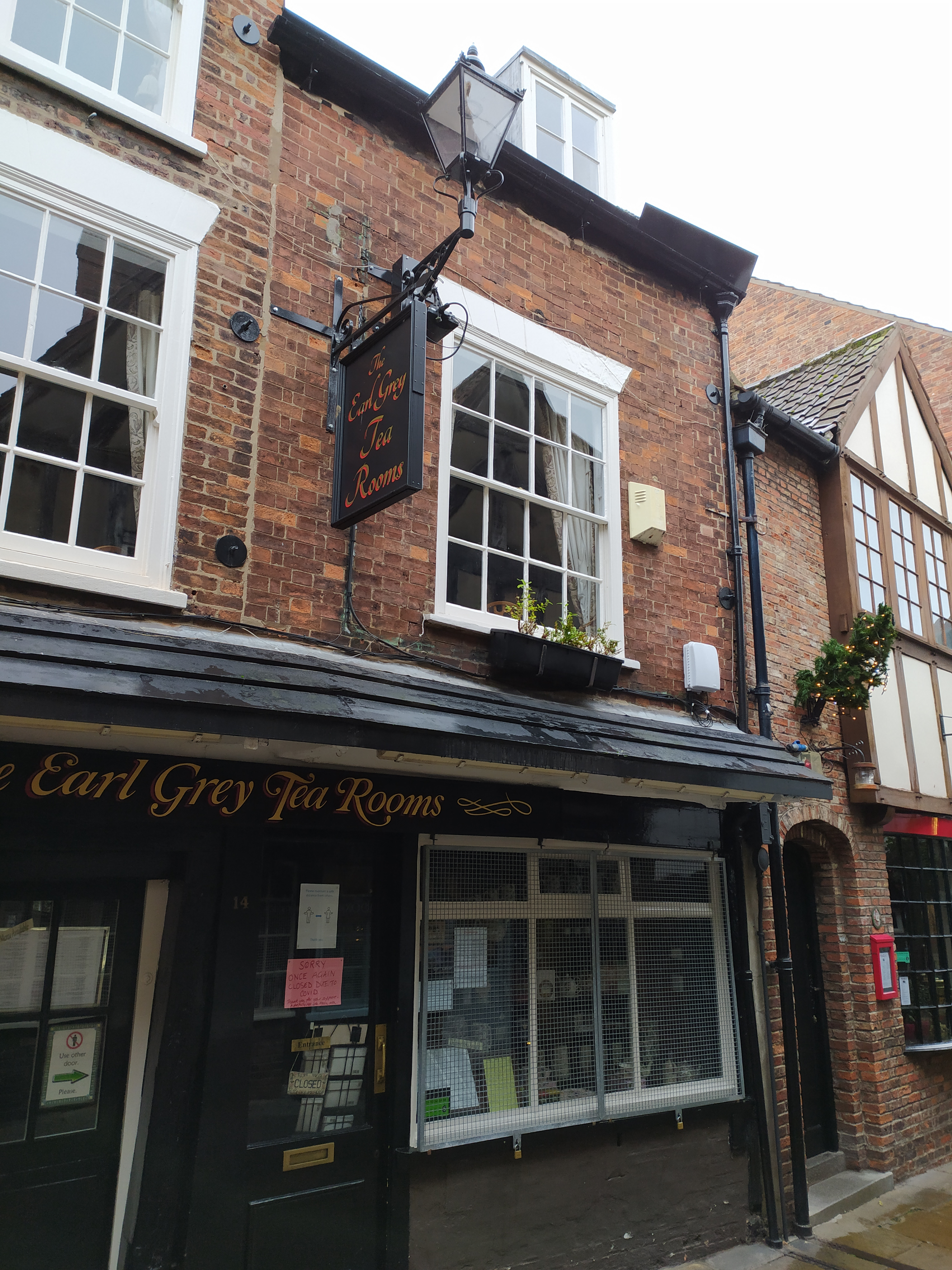
- The building in 2020
- Interactive map of the 14 The Shambles area

General information
- Location: The Shambles, York, England
- Coordinates: 53°57′34″N 1°04′48″W
- Year built: Early 19th century
- Renovated: 20th century (altered and extended)

Design and construction
- Designations

Listed Building – Grade II*
- Official name: 14, Shambles
- Designated: 14 June 1954
- Reference no.: 1256679

14 The Shambles is a historic building on The Shambles in York, England. Grade II* listed, part of the structure dates to the early 19th century, but also features parts of an earlier structure. An alteration and extension was made in the 20th century.

As of 2026, the building and its neighbour No. 13 are occupied by The Earl Grey Tea Rooms.

== See also ==
- Grade II* listed buildings in the City of York
- Listed buildings in York (within the city walls, northern part)
