= 64 and 66 Low Petergate =

Listed building in York, England

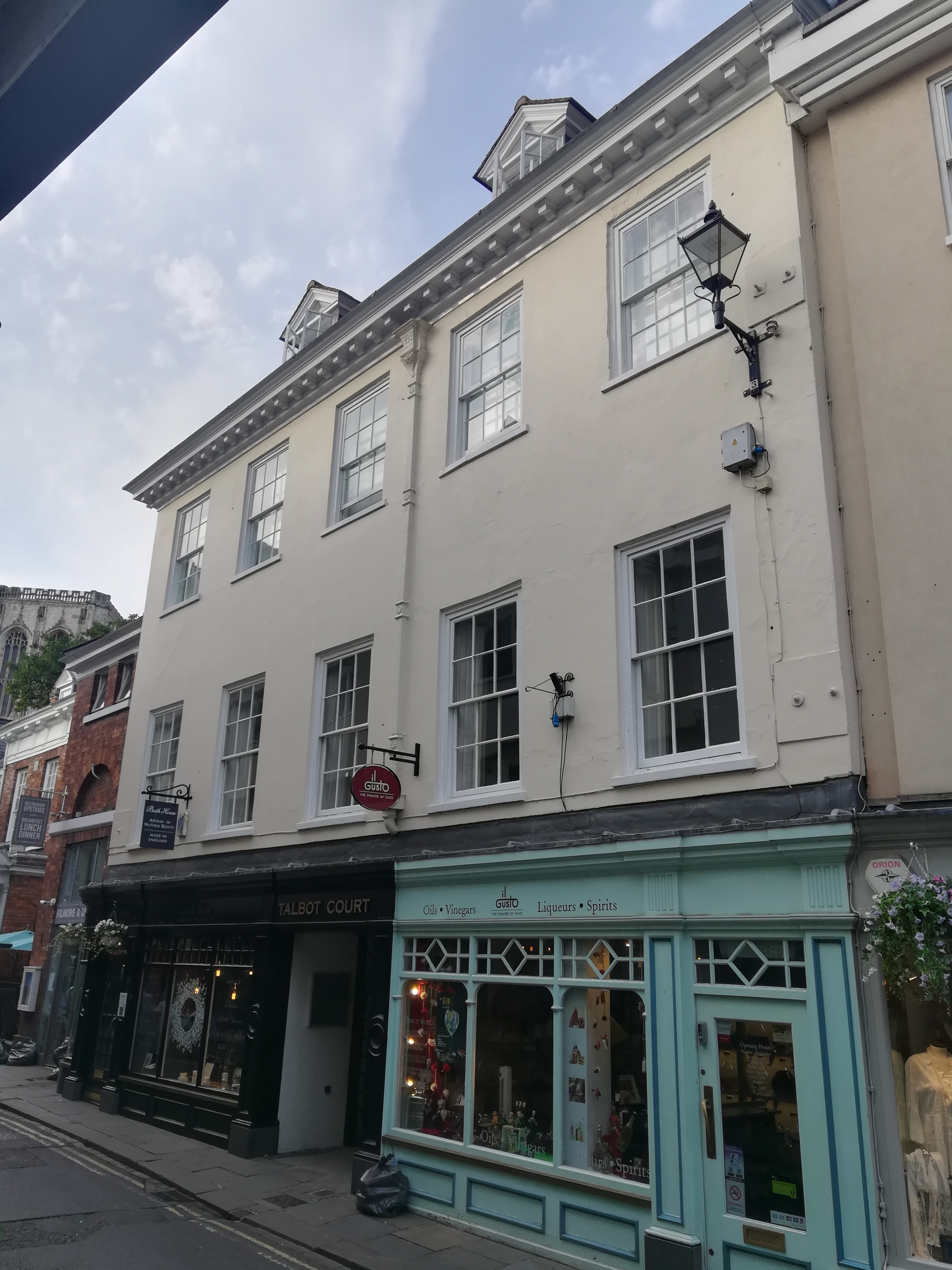
- The building in 2018
- Interactive map of the 64 and 66 Low Petergate area

General information
- Location: Low Petergate, York, England
- Coordinates: 53°57′39″N 1°04′51″W
- Completed: 15th and 16th centuries (rear wings); 1743 (front block)
- Renovated: Early 17th century (remodelled); 2007 (restored)

Technical details
- Floor count: 3 + attic

Design and construction
- Designations

Listed Building – Grade II*
- Official name: York College for Girls
- Designated: 14 June 1954
- Reference no.: 1257411

64 and 66 Low Petergate is a Grade II* listed building in the city centre of York, England.

The building lies on Low Petergate, which has long been one of the major streets in York city centre. The oldest part of the building is the south-east wing, which dates from the 15th century. This was part of a house which was owned by the Talbot family in the 16th century, and they added a two-storey structure on the north-east side of the wing, which has been reduced over time to a small, single-storey section. In the 17th century, the neighbouring 62 Low Petergate became the Talbot Inn, one of the main coaching inns in the city, and it may have extended into what is now Nos. 64 and 66. The 15th-century walls were mostly rebuilt, and a new staircase was added, now known as the Talbot Stairs, and a new wing was added to the north-west. All this section of the building is timber-framed, and has been heavily restored.

In 1743, the front of the building was rebuilt. The new front was three storeys tall, and five bays wide. The upper floor windows survive, as does the top of a drainpipe, dated 1743, two fireplaces, a door, and two staircases. The ground floor has been replaced with 20th-century plate glass shopfronts.

In the 20th century, the building formed part of the York College for Girls. This closed in 1997, and the building was restored in 2007. The front part of its ground floor serves as two shops, while the upper floors are residential.

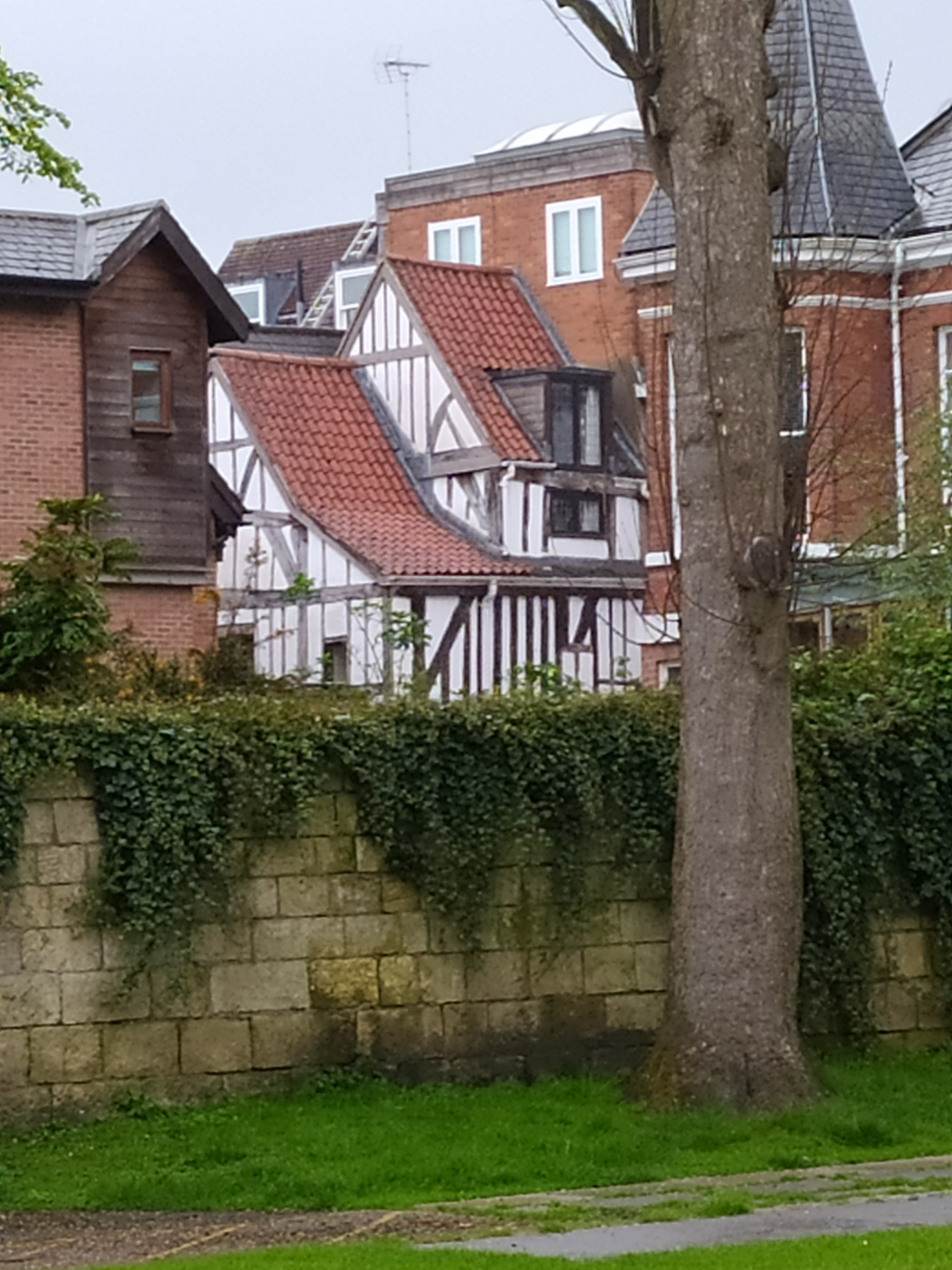
The timber-framed wings at the rear of the building

== See also ==
- Grade II* listed buildings in the City of York
- Listed buildings in York (within the city walls, northern part)
