= 5 Precentor's Court =

Listed building in York, England

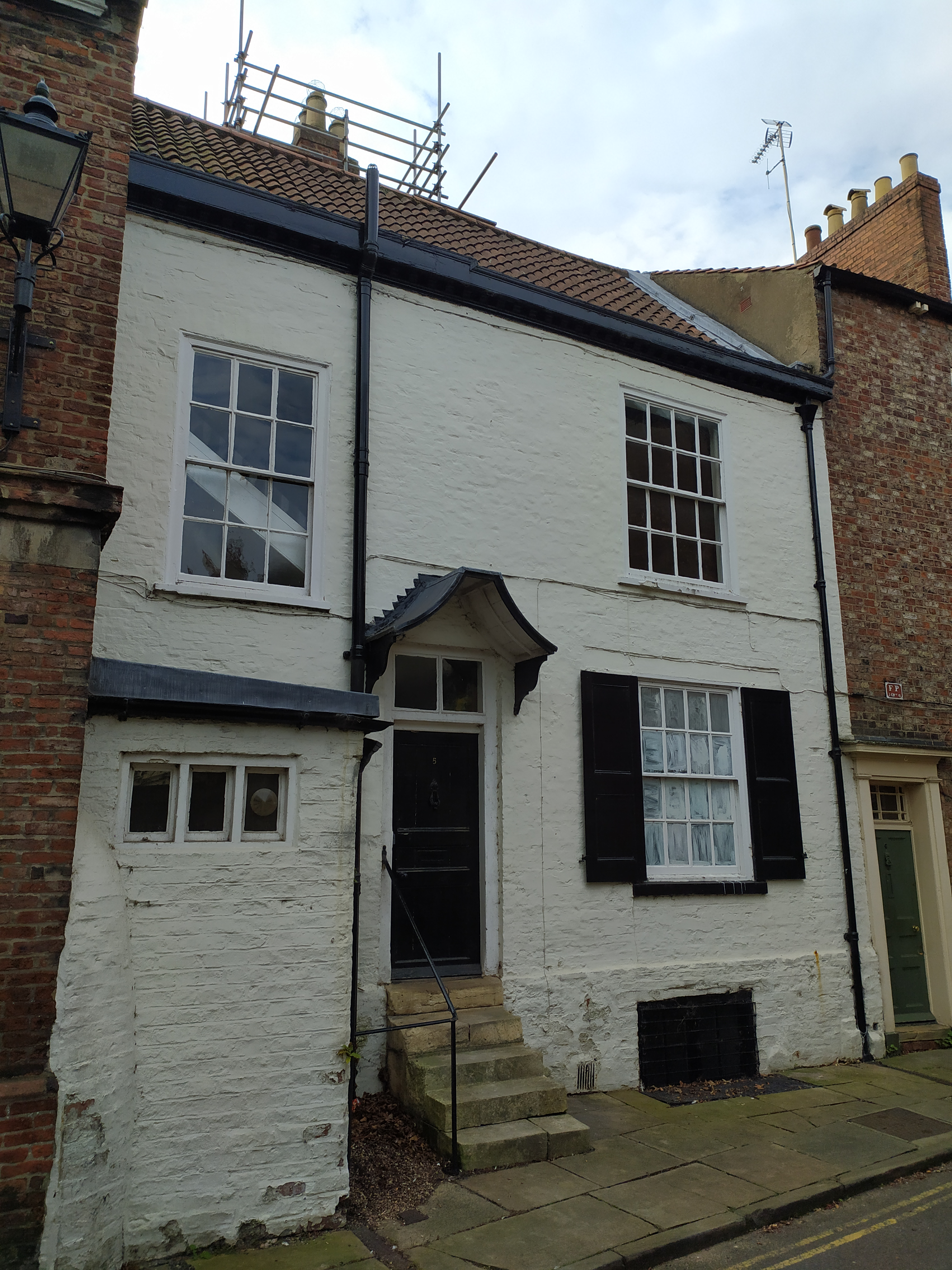
- The building in 2020
- Interactive map of the 5 Precentor's Court area

General information
- Location: Precentor's Court, York, England
- Coordinates: 53°57′45″N 1°05′03″W
- Completed: Early 18th century

Technical details
- Floor count: 2 + cellar + attic

Design and construction
- Designations

Listed Building – Grade II*
- Official name: 5, Precentors Court
- Designated: 14 June 1954
- Reference no.: 1256864

5 Precentor's Court is a historic building in the city of York, North Yorkshire, England. A Grade II* listed building, standing on Precentor's Court, it dates to the early 18th century.

Architect Henry Cane was living at the property in 1872, while James Boyd, a licensed preacher in the diocese of York, lived there in the early 20th century.

== See also ==
- Grade II* listed buildings in the City of York
- Listed buildings in York (within the city walls, northern part)
