= 4 and 4A Stonegate =

Listed building in York, England

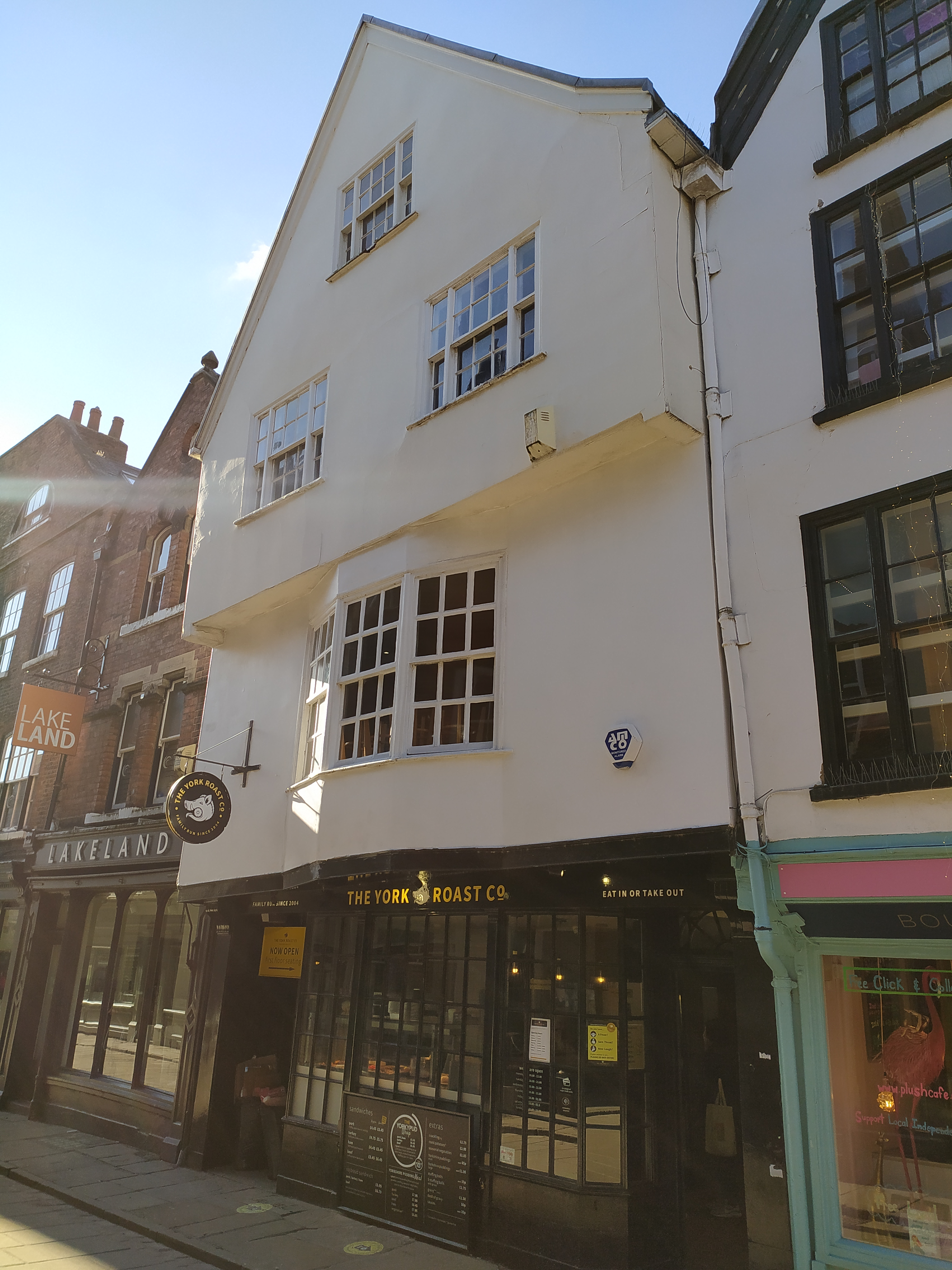
- The building in 2021
- Interactive map of the 4 and 4A Stonegate area

General information
- Type: House and shop, now in retail use
- Location: Stonegate, York, England
- Coordinates: 53°57′38″N 1°05′03″W
- Year built: Early 17th century

Design and construction
- Designations

Listed Building – Grade II*
- Official name: 4 and 4A, Stonegate
- Designated: 24 June 1983
- Reference no.: 1256568

4 and 4A Stonegate is a Grade II* listed building on Stonegate in the city of York, England. Built as a house and shop in the early 17th century, it has been altered over time for commercial use, and the former unit known as 4A now appears to be incorporated within No. 4. By the mid‑19th century the upper floors of No. 4 and the neighbouring No. 3 were occupied separately, and the shopfront and ground floor were modernised in the first half of the 20th century. The building was included in the Central Historic Core conservation area in 1968. No. 4 is now occupied by The York Roast Co.

== History ==
Built on Stonegate as a house and a shop in the early 17th century, the building has since been altered for commercial use only.

Census records from 1838 show that the property belonged to Frederick Adams, a hairdresser and wigmaker who lived and worked at No. 4. By 1861, however, the upper floors of No. 4 and the neighbouring No. 3 were occupied by Susan Meynell, a change that may have affected how the building was entered and accessed. In the first half of the 20th century, the shopfront and ground floor were modernised.

In 1968 the site was included within the newly established Central Historic Core conservation area, and on 24 June 1983, Nos. 4–4A were designated a Grade II* listed building. The unit formerly numbered 4A appears to have been absorbed into No. 4, as it is no longer recorded as a separate address. No. 4 is now occupied by The York Roast Co.

== Architecture ==
The building is timber‑framed with an incised stucco front and a plain tile roof. It has three storeys and an attic, with a single‑window gabled front and jettied first and second floors. The shopfront has a three‑light small‑pane window set between sunk‑panelled pilasters, with a margin‑glazed and panelled door to the left; a similar door stands to the right, both with patterned fanlights. The first floor has a three‑light canted bay window with 12‑pane sashes. The second‑floor and attic windows are tripartite, each with a 12‑pane centre sash.

=== Interior ===
Both the first and second floors have a large front room. Timber framing is evident on the second floor, where the front room contains a blocked fireplace with a late 17th or early 18th‑century bolection‑moulded surround; a similar fireplace from the first floor is said to be stored in the attic. The rear wing is narrower and contains the modern staircase with small rooms behind.

== See also ==
- Grade II* listed buildings in the City of York
- Listed buildings in York (within the city walls, northern part)
