= 44 The Shambles =

Listed building in York, England

- The building in 2025
- Alternative names: Shambles Tavern; Ye Old Shambles Tavern

General information
- Type: Shop; originally a house
- Location: The Shambles, York, England
- Coordinates: 53°57′35″N 1°04′49″W
- Completed: Late 15th century
- Renovated: 16th century (extended); Late 18th century (refronted); 19th century (shopfront); 1954 (renovated)

Technical details
- Floor count: 3

Design and construction
- Designations

Listed Building – Grade II*
- Official name: 44, Shambles
- Designated: 1 July 1968
- Reference no.: 1256659

Website
- shamblestavern.com

44 The Shambles is a Grade II* listed building on The Shambles in York, England. Originating as a house in the late 15th century, it was refaced in the late 18th century and altered in the mid‑19th century, with further renovation in 1954. In 1968 it became part of the Central Historic Core conservation area. As of 2025, it is occupied by Ye Old Shambles Tavern, a café and gift shop selling cask ale and Yorkshire beers.

== History ==
The building, which stands on The Shambles, began as a house in the late 15th century. Its front was rebuilt in the late 18th century, followed by mid‑19th‑century changes that included a new shopfront. It was renovated again in 1954.

In January 1968, the premises was included within the newly established Central Historic Core conservation area, and on 1 July 1968, No. 44 was designated a Grade II* listed building. It stands between No. 43, built in 1775, and No. 45, an early-18th-century property; both are listed at Grade II.

As of 2025, the building is occupied by Ye Old Shambles Tavern, a café and gift shop that also sells cask ale and bottled beers from breweries in Yorkshire. As of July 2025, the freehold is independently owned.

== Architecture ==
The building has a timber structure, with pale orange brickwork at the front and a rendered finish at the back. A tiled roof sits above, with a brick chimney and timber guttering.

The front has three storeys and a single window bay. The shop entrance is on the left, with a glazed door and a small divided window above it. To its right is a wide horizontal window made up of small panes. The upper floors each have a simple four‑pane sash window.

At the rear, the building rises three storeys plus an attic, with the timber frame visible in the gable wall. The windows here are horizontal sliding types: larger ones with multiple panes at ground level, and smaller versions on the upper floors and in the attic.

=== Interior ===
The inside keeps much of its original timber structure throughout. A staircase with a solid outer edge, shaped balusters and a moulded handrail climbs around an open central space up to the second floor.

== See also ==
- Grade II* listed buildings in the City of York
- Listed buildings in York (within the city walls, northern part)
