= 39 The Shambles =

Listed building in York, England

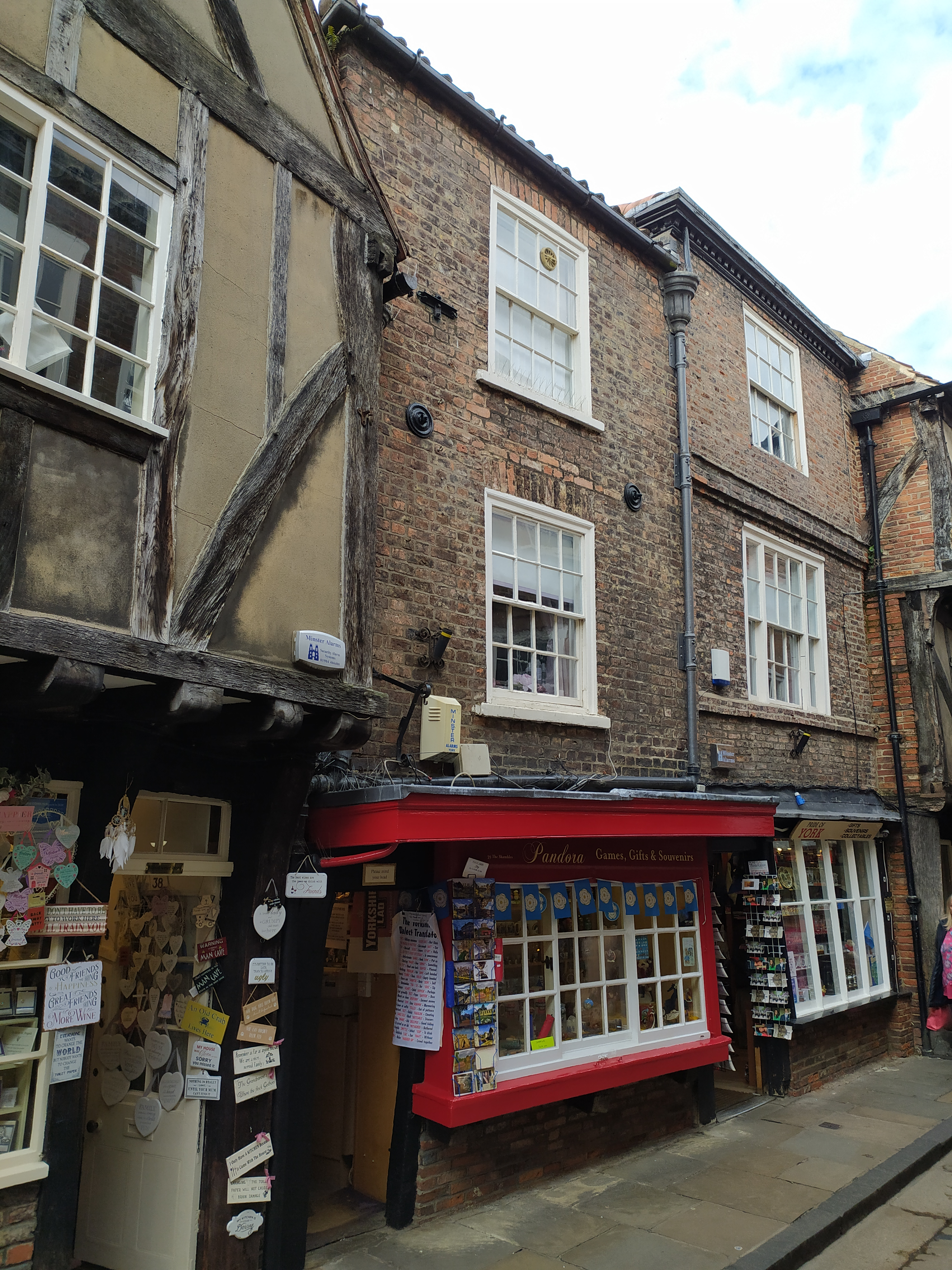
- The building in 2020
- Interactive map of the 39 The Shambles area

General information
- Location: 39 The Shambles, York, England
- Coordinates: 53.959385°N 1.080227°W
- Completed: Late 15th century
- Renovated: Late 17th century (extended); Early 19th century (remodelled)

Design and construction
- Designations

Listed Building – Grade II*
- Official name: 39, Shambles
- Designated: 14 June 1954
- Reference no.: 1256644

39 The Shambles is a historic building in York, England. Grade II* listed, part of the structure dates to the late 15th century, with an extension added in the late 17th century, followed by a remodelling in the early 19th century.

As of 2025, the building was occupied by Mrs B's Emporium of Gifts.

== See also ==
- Grade II* listed buildings in the City of York
- Listed buildings in York (within the city walls, northern part)
