= 33–35 High Petergate =

Listed building in York, England

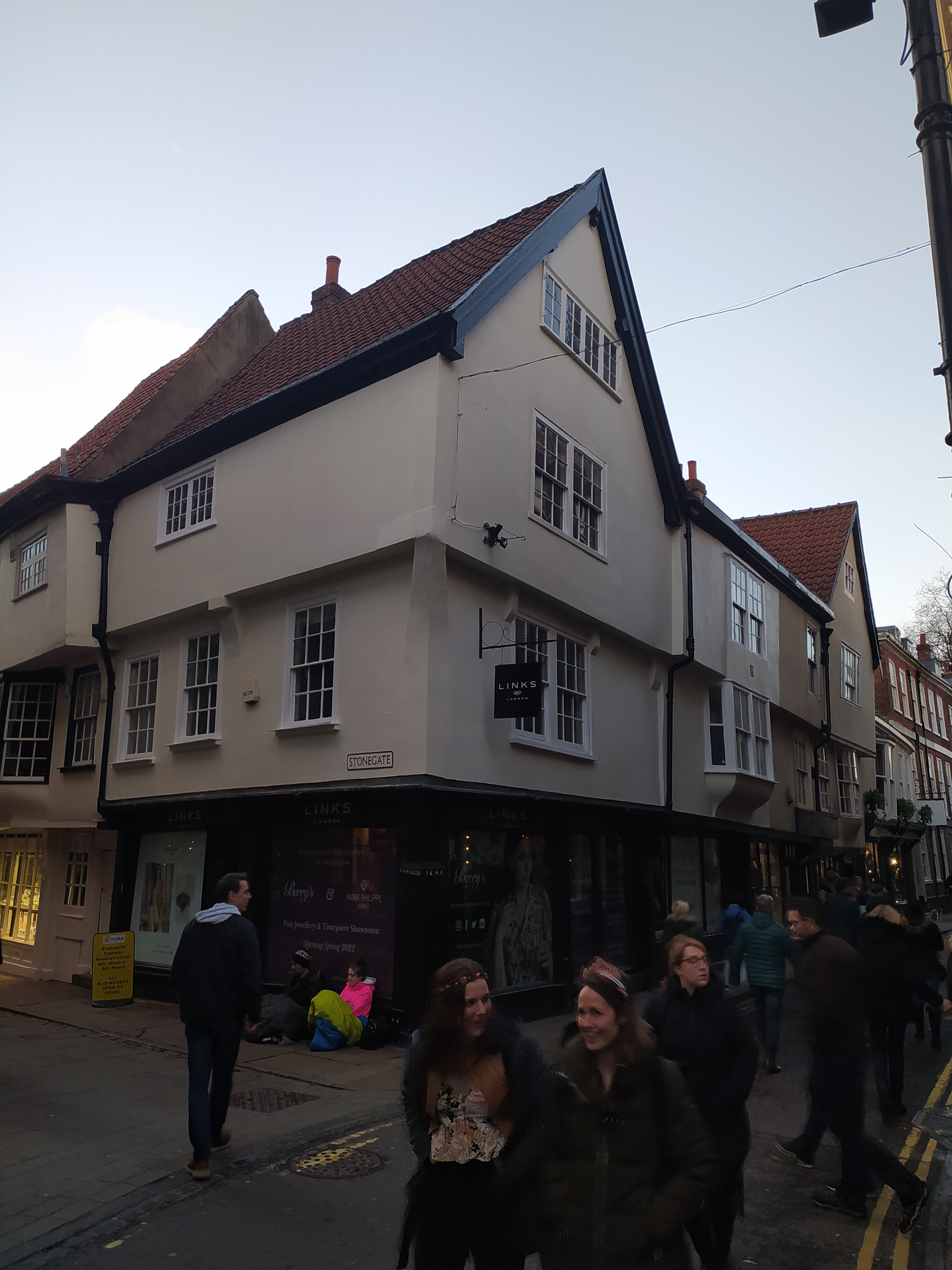
- The building in 2022

- Location within York Central

General information
- Location: York, North Yorkshire, England
- Coordinates: 53.9615°N 1.0826°W
- Year built: 14th century
- Renovated: 1600 (added); Early 18th century (extended)

Technical details
- Material: Timber framed

Design and construction
- Designations

Listed Building – Grade II*
- Official name: 60, Stonegate, 33, 33A and 35, High Petergate
- Designated: 14 June 1954
- Reference no.: 1257580

33–35 High Petergate is a medieval building in the city centre of York, England.

The oldest part of the building was constructed in the 14th century as part of a terrace facing Stonegate, this part is now known as 60 Stonegate. The main part of the building, two houses now numbered 33 and 35 High Petergate, is timber framed and was originally of two jettied storeys, built at an unknown date. Around 1600, a jettied second floor and attic were added, and 60 Stonegate was combined with the High Petergate row. At the corner of the building is a dragon post inscribed ":ANNO:DO:1646".

In the early 18th century, an extension was added at the rear of the building, doubling its depth. 33 Petergate was altered in the early 19th century, and a small brick-built rear wing was added. Later in the century, shop fronts were inserted at ground level, and these survive. Inside, there are several early doors and the upper part of the staircase in No. 35 is also early, while the lower part is 18th century. The staircase in No. 33 is early 19th century.

The building was Grade II* listed in 1954. It is currently divided into two shops, with flats above.

== See also ==
- Grade II* listed buildings in the City of York
- Listed buildings in York (within the city walls, northern part)
