= Fenton House, York =

Listed building in York, England

Fenton House
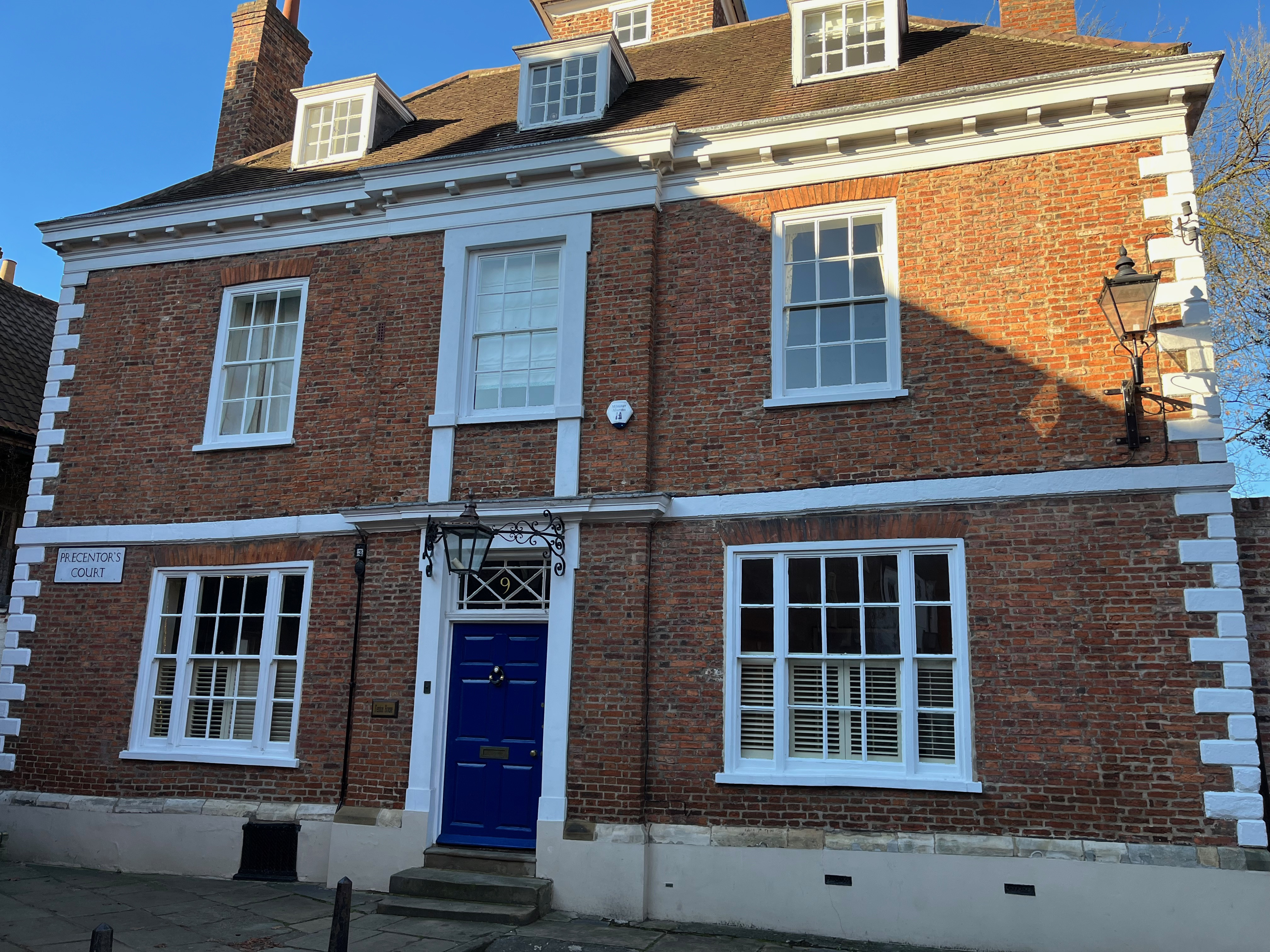
- The building in 2023
- Interactive map of the Fenton House area

General information
- Location: 9 Precentor's Court, York, England
- Coordinates: 53°57′46″N 1°05′05″W
- Completed: 1680
- Renovated: Early 19th and 20th centuries (alterations)

Technical details
- Floor count: 2 + cellar + attic

Design and construction
- Designations

Listed Building – Grade II*
- Official name: Fenton House
- Designated: 14 June 1954
- Reference no.: 1256868

Fenton House is an historic building in the English city of York, North Yorkshire. It is Grade II* listed, standing at 9 Precentor's Court.

== History ==
The house dates to 1680, although a mediaeval wall was discovered when floor repairs took place. Looking directly down Precentor's Court, from its western end, to York Minster, the building was formerly the prebendal house of Cave and, later, Fenton. It stands perpendicular to 10 Precentor's Court at the western end of the street.

A new frontage was installed on the house around 1705, giving the south facade its refined Queen Anne orange brick appearance. The rear elevation was also rebuilt in the 18th century, although three original attic windows survive. The house was largely refurbished in the 19th century, but some original panelling and the balustrade of the staircase of 1680 survive.

In 2013, the eight-bedroom home was put on the market for £1.1 million.

== Architecture ==
The building has a square plan, with four rooms on each of its two storeys. There are also attics and a basement. It is built of brick.

=== Exterior ===
The South Elevation was built in Flemish bond orange brick with painted stone quoins and a chamfered stone plinth. The central bay projects slightly and features an eared doorway surround set beneath a moulded stone cornice. The door has six panels, an overlight with decorative cross glazing, and is approached by three stone steps. Windows are 12-pane timber sashes in flat arches of orange gauged brick.

The hipped tiled roof has three flat dormers with Yorkshire sashes and is surmounted by a square timber lantern featuring a pyramidal tiled roof.

The rear elevation is constructed of orange-brown brick in English garden-wall bond, featuring a tall radial-glazed staircase sash window beneath a segmental brick arch.

=== Interior ===
The Entrance Hall features a moulded segmental entrance arch supported on wide fluted pilasters decorated with foliar necking and floral drops suspending from lion masks. The 1680 open-well timber staircase features a moulded close string with a terminal volute, heavy bulbous balusters with pendant finials, square newel posts with attached half-balusters, and a heavy ramped handrail.The house retains fielded dado panelling, panelled window recesses with window seats, raised-and-fielded six-panel doors, and 18th-century moulded plaster ceiling cornices.

== See also ==
- Grade II* listed buildings in the City of York
- Precentor's Court
- Listed buildings in York (within the city walls, northern part)
