= 7–8 The Shambles =

Listed building in York, England

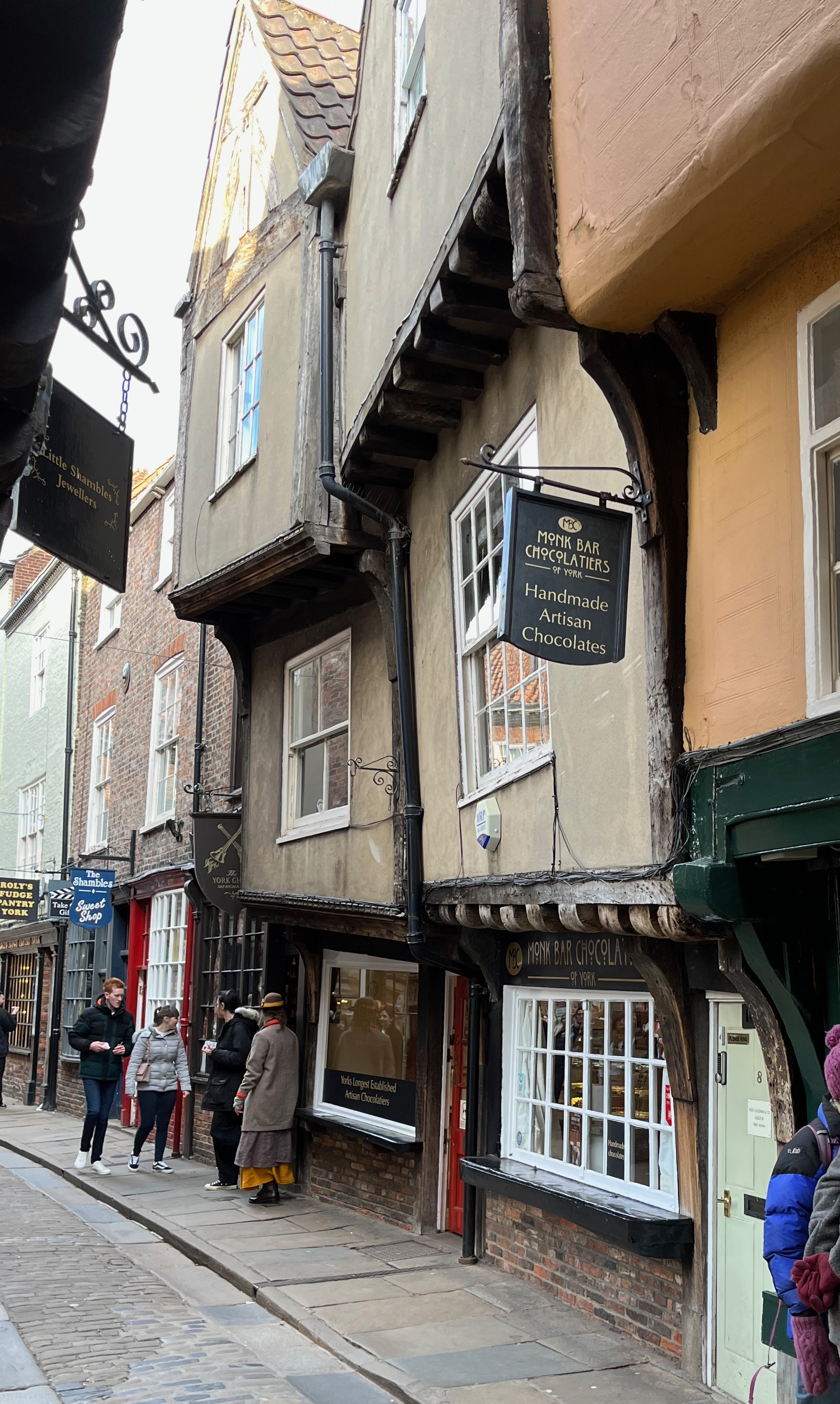
- The buildings in 2023
- Interactive map of the 7–8 The Shambles area

General information
- Location: The Shambles, York, North Yorkshire, England
- Coordinates: 53°57′35″N 1°04′49″W
- Years built: Early 15th century (No. 8); Late 15th century (No. 7)

Technical details
- Floor count: 2 / 3

Design and construction
- Designations

Listed Building – Grade II*
- Official name: 7 and 8, Shambles
- Designated: 14 June 1954
- Reference no.: 1256674

7–8 The Shambles is a historic pair of buildings in York, England. Grade II* listed buildings dating to the early and late 15th century, they are located on The Shambles.

No. 8 is the older house, and was built in the early 1400s. It originally had one room on each of its three storeys, with a courtyard behind, but in the 16th century the yard was infilled with a two-storey extension. In about 1700, the extension was reduced in length, and a further extension was added, which included a kitchen. In the 19th century, the level of the second floor was raised.

No. 7 was built in the late 1400s, filling the space between No. 8 and a now-demolished building. Like No. 8, it is of three storeys, each of which is jettied. Each floor is divided into three rooms, one behind another, although the position of the partitions has been altered over time. In the 18th century, the rearmost bay of the building was shortened. Inside, there is a 17th-century chimney breast, built of brick, and much of the original timber framing survives. The fireplace on the first floor is original.

Both buildings have been converted into shops, with an office on the top floor. Since 2002, the shops have been occupied by Monk Bar Chocolatiers.

== Gallery ==
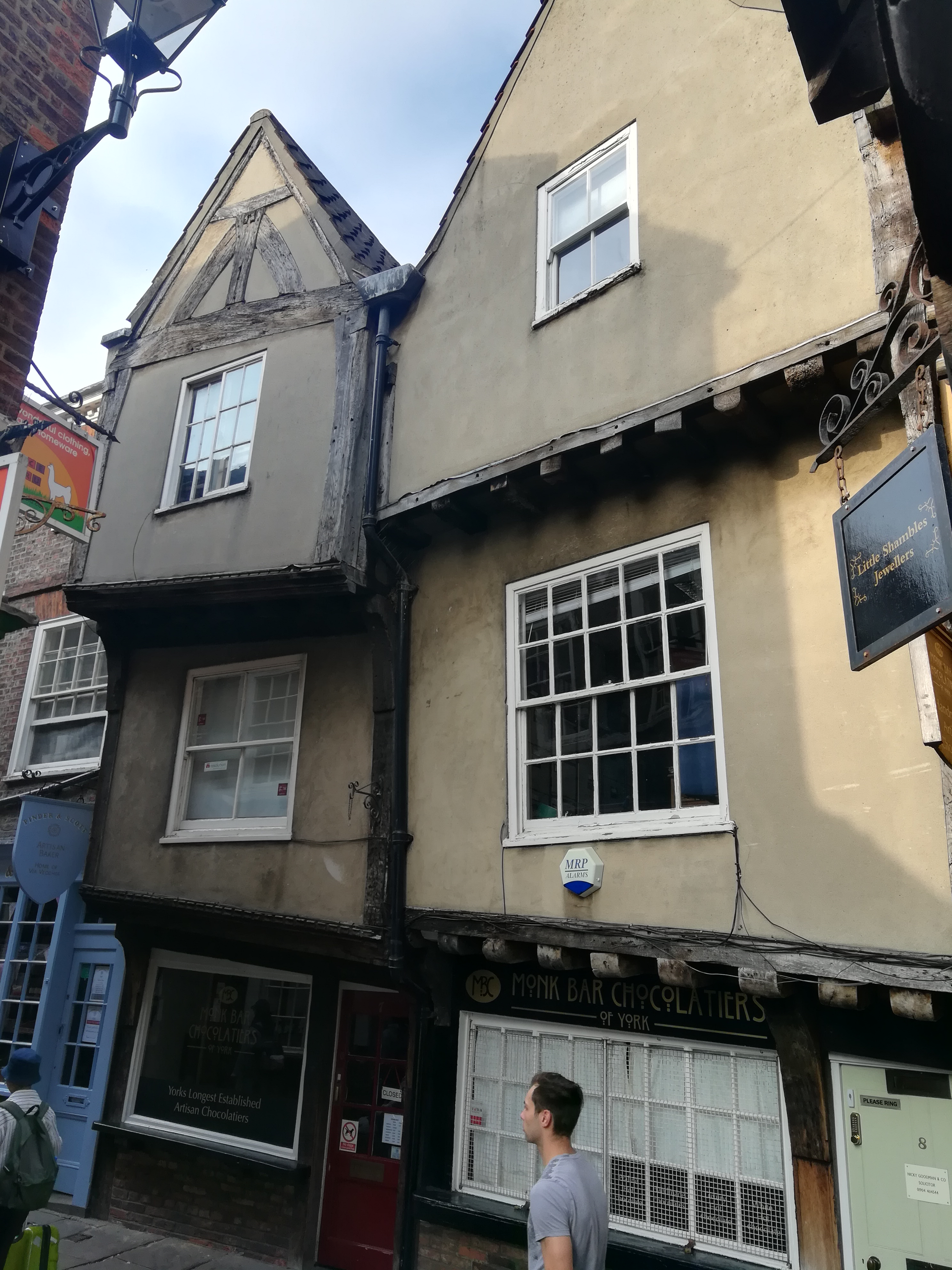
Viewed from Little Shambles

== See also ==
- Grade II* listed buildings in the City of York
- Listed buildings in York (within the city walls, northern part)
