= 4 Minster Yard =

Listed building in York, England

- The building in 2023

General information
- Location: Minster Yard, York, England
- Coordinates: 53°57′45″N 1°04′51″W
- Completed: Early 18th century
- Renovated: Early 19th century (altered); 1992 (restored)

Technical details
- Floor count: 2 + attic

Design and construction
- Designations

Listed Building – Grade II*
- Official name: Number 4 and attached garden wall, gate and railings at front and back
- Designated: 14 June 1954
- Reference no.: 1257254

4 Minster Yard is a historic building in the city centre of York, England.

The house lies on the street of Minster Yard, immediately east of York Minster. It was built before 1727, replacing some medieval buildings. Parts of the earlier buildings were retained, but most were in the wing which was later split off as 1 College Street; the exception is the north east gable.

The house is two storeys tall, built of brick, with a basement and attic. Its front is five bays wide and is symmetrical. The façade was altered in the late 18th century, from which time the door and doorcase date, and the cornice was also added. Inside, two original doorcases survive on the ground floor. Other original features are the main staircase, and the decoration of the north west room on the first floor. The south east ground floor room was redecorated in the late 18th century and retains this style.

The house was altered in the early 19th century, and was restored in 1992. It was Grade II* listed in 1954, along with the garden wall, gate and railings at the front and back.

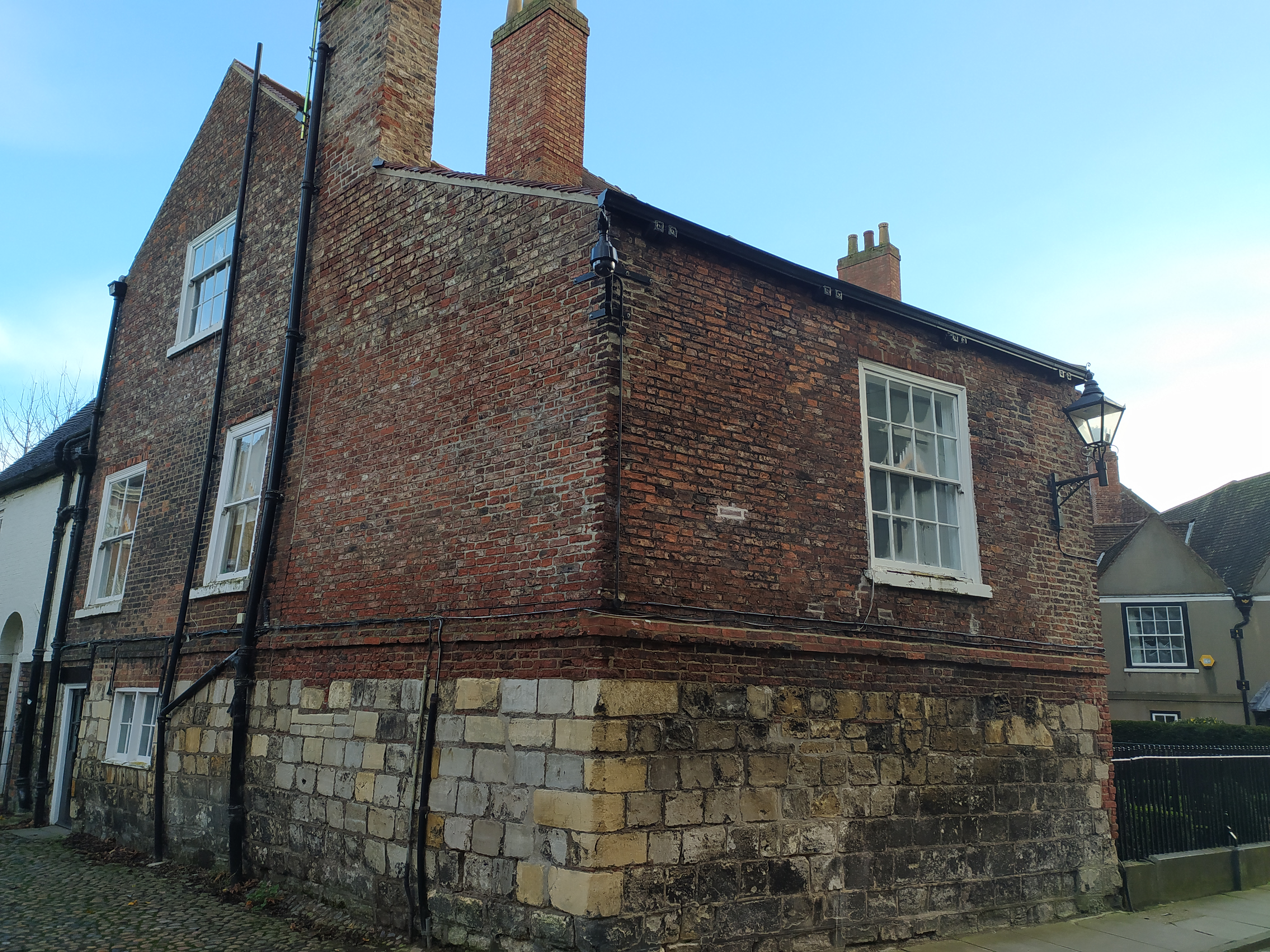
The rear of the property

== See also ==
- Grade II* listed buildings in the City of York
- Listed buildings in York (within the city walls, northern part)
