= 8 Stonegate =

Listed building in York, England

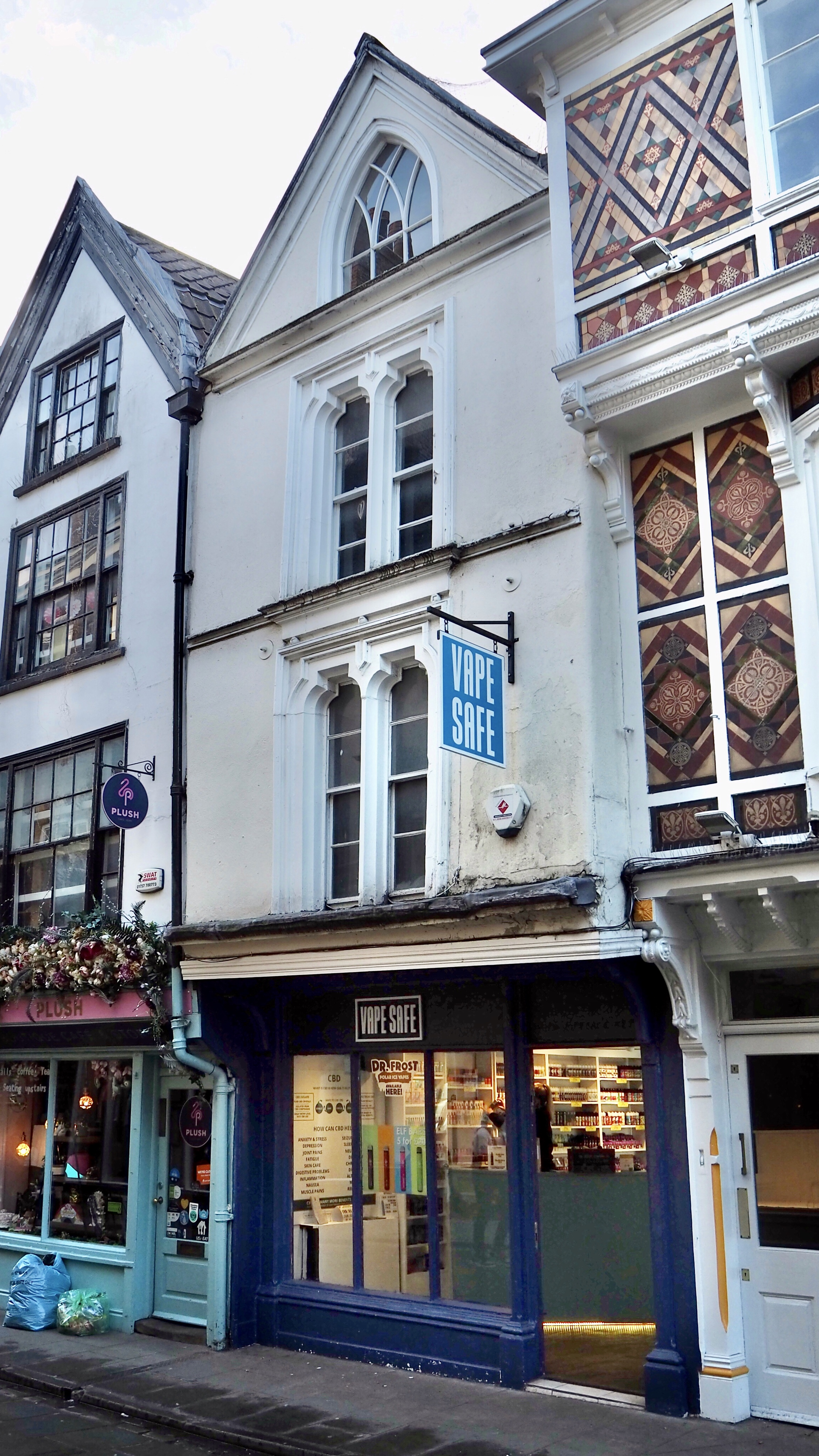
- The building in 2023
- Interactive map of the 8 Stonegate area

General information
- Location: Stonegate, York, England
- Coordinates: 53°57′38″N 1°05′03″W
- Completed: Early 17th century
- Renovated: c. 1830 (remodelled); Late 19th century (extended and shopfront)

Technical details
- Floor count: 3 + attic

Design and construction
- Designations

Listed Building – Grade II*
- Official name: 8, Stonegate
- Designated: 14 June 1954
- Reference no.: 1256536

8 Stonegate is a historic building in the city centre of York, England.

The building stands on Stonegate. It was constructed in the early 17th century, on a narrow plot, a single bay wide and two bays deep. It has three storeys and an attic, but in about 1830 the second and attic floors were lowered, to give more headroom in the attic. Most of the jettying was removed at this time, with just the first floor jetty retained, and new windows were installed, in a Gothic Revival style. Later in the century, there was a small extension at the rear of the building, to house a new staircase.

The building is timber-framed, with a stucco front and stone dressings, while the roof is covered with slates. The ground floor has a late 19th-century shopfront, with a large three-paned window and a glazed door. The first and second floors have narrow paired sash windows, while the attic has a pointed window. Inside, some timber framing is visible on the second floor, and there is a moulded ceiling beam on the first floor.

The building was Grade II* listed in 1954. It is used as a shop, with accommodation above.

== See also ==
- Grade II* listed buildings in the City of York
- Listed buildings in York (within the city walls, northern part)
