= 12 The Shambles =

Listed building in York, England

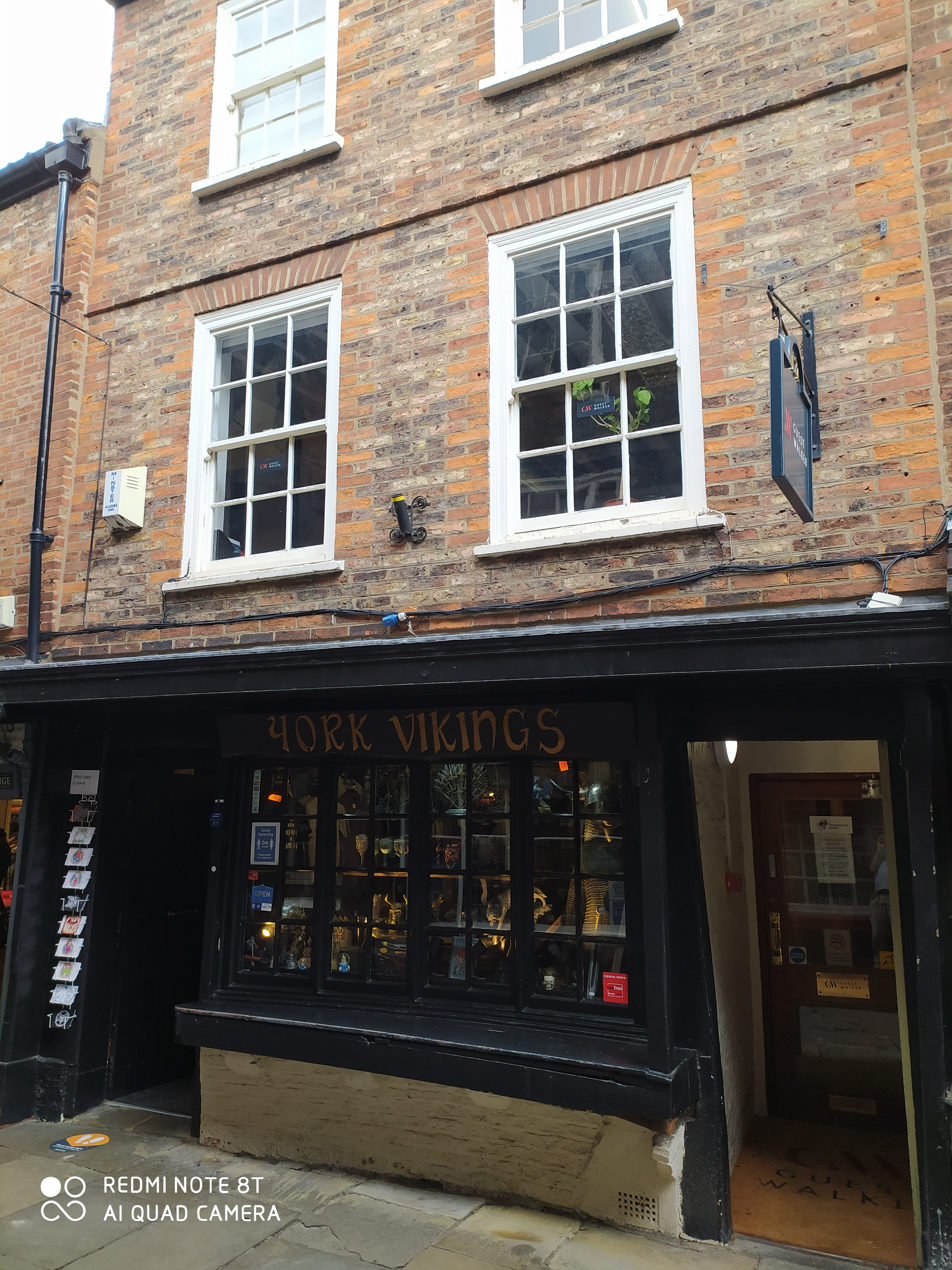
- The building in 2020, looking north
- Interactive map of the 12 The Shambles area

General information
- Location: 12 The Shambles, York, England
- Coordinates: 53°57′34″N 1°04′48″W
- Completed: Late 15th century
- Renovated: Early 19th century (refronted); 20th century (renovated)

Technical details
- Material: Timber framed, brick
- Floor count: 3

Design and construction
- Designations

Listed Building – Grade II*
- Official name: 12 and 12A, Shambles
- Designated: 14 June 1954
- Reference no.: 1256677

12 The Shambles is a historic building in York, England.

A building was constructed on the site in about 1400, probably being T-shaped and set a little off the street. In the late 15th century, a new three-storey building was constructed in front of the existing house. In the 16th century, the front part of the rear building was replaced with a two-storey building with attics, adjoining the front block.

In the early 18th century, the building was refronted in brick, removing the jettying of the timber framed structure. The building was further altered in the 19th century. In the 20th century, work at the rear removed the last remnants of the building from 1400, and a new shopfront was added on the ground floor, facing onto The Shambles. In 1954, it was Grade II* listed.

As of 2020, the building is occupied by York Vikings, with Guest Walker & Co Solicitors on the upper floors at 12A.

== See also ==
- Grade II* listed buildings in the City of York
- Listed buildings in York (within the city walls, northern part)
