= 56–60 Low Petergate =

Listed building in York, England

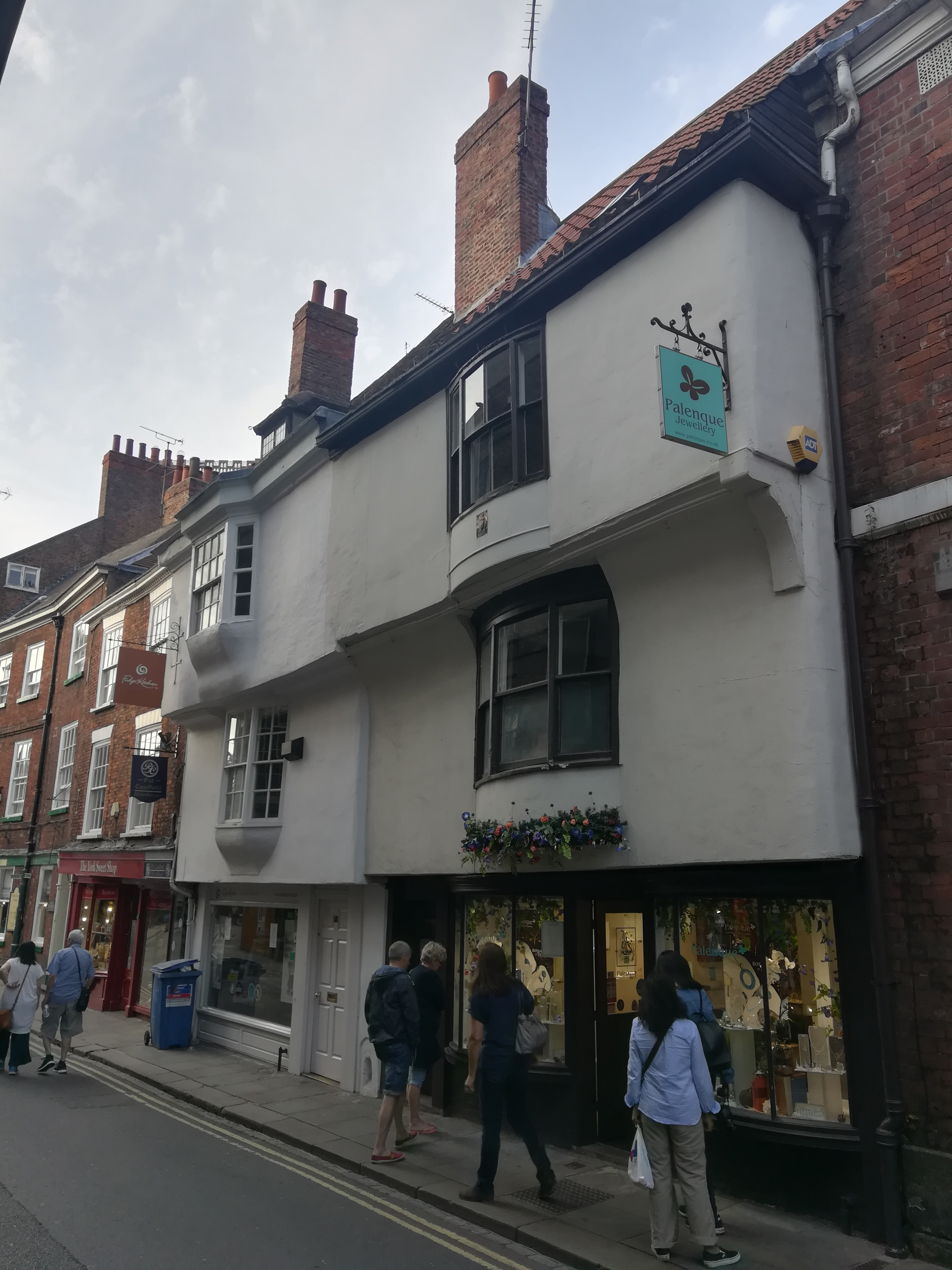
- The building in 2018
- Interactive map of the 56–60 Low Petergate area

General information
- Location: Low Petergate, York, England
- Coordinates: 53°57′40″N 1°04′53″W
- Completed: c. 1500
- Renovated: Early 17th century (remodelled); Late 18th, early 19th, and 20th centuries (altered)

Technical details
- Floor count: 3

Design and construction
- Designations

Listed Building – Grade II*
- Official name: 56, 58 and 60, Low Petergate
- Designated: 14 June 1954
- Reference no.: 1257437

56–60 Low Petergate is a historic building in the city centre of York, in England.

The building was constructed in about 1500 as a terrace of five houses on the north-east side of Low Petergate, for John Stockdale. It has three storeys and is five bays long, with timber framing and a jettied front. In about 1630, it was redivided into the current three properties, with chimneys and an attic storey added, and extensions at the rear of each property. In the early 19th century, No. 56 was refronted in brick, while further brick extensions were added to the rear of Nos. 58 and 60. The bay windows at the front of Nos. 58 and 60 date from around 1800, and the shopfront of No. 56 is also 19th-century; the other buildings having 20th-century shopfronts.

Inside, some early fixtures and fittings survive, including the 17th-century top section of the staircase in No. 56, and there is a 17th-century plaster overmantel on the first floor, displaying the Stuart coat of arms. There is also a 17th-century cupboard door on the second floor, while other doors date from the 18th century. In No. 58, there is a ground floor room with 18th-century panelling, and on the first floor there is an 18th-century overmantel, while in No. 60 there is a first floor room with 18th-century panelling.

The building was Grade II* listed in 1954.

== See also ==
- Grade II* listed buildings in the City of York
- Listed buildings in York (within the city walls, northern part)
