= 37 Stonegate =

Listed building in York, England

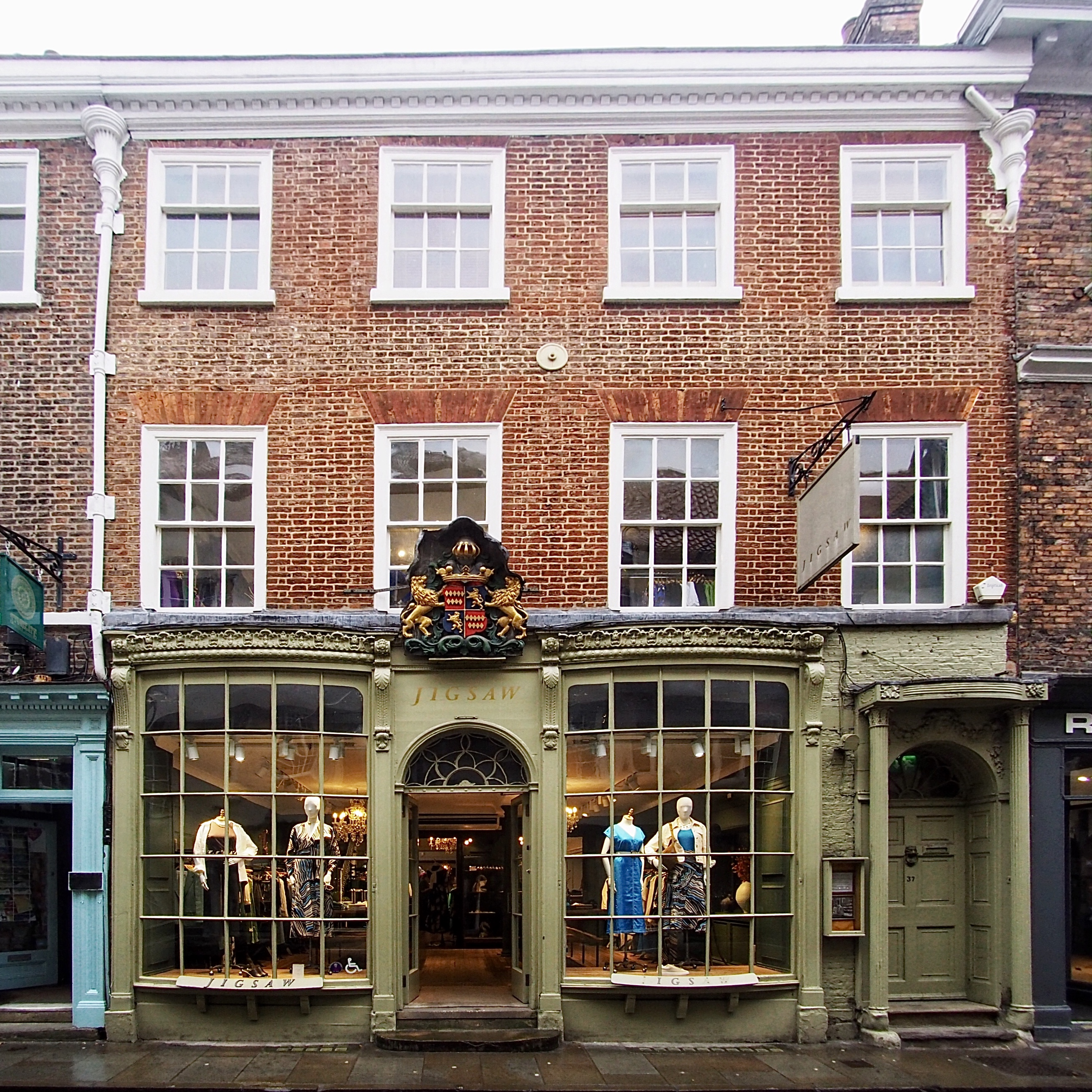
- The building in 2023
- Interactive map of the 37 Stonegate area
- Former names: 24 Stonegate

General information
- Type: House, now in retail use
- Location: Stonegate, York, England
- Coordinates: 53°57′40″N 1°04′58″W
- Year built: Mid-18th century
- Renovated: Early 19th century (converted)

Design and construction
- Designations

Listed Building – Grade II*
- Official name: 37, Stonegate
- Designated: 14 June 1954
- Reference no.: 1256527

37 Stonegate is a Grade II* listed building on Stonegate in the city of York, England. Built in the mid‑18th century as part of a three‑house terrace, two of the houses were later combined to form a single shop and adapted for retail use in the early 19th century, with further alteration and extension afterwards. The building was included in the Central Historic Core conservation area in 1968. It is now occupied by Jigsaw, a clothing shop, and stands next to No. 35, also listed at Grade II*.

== History ==
The building stands on Stonegate and was constructed as part of a three‑house terrace in the mid‑18th century, with two of the houses later combined to form a single shop. The combined buildings were adapted for retail use in the early 19th century and underwent further alteration and extension afterwards. It was formerly known as 24 Stonegate, although the date at which this numbering was applied is unclear.

On 14 June 1954, No. 37 was designated a Grade II* listed building, and in 1968 the site was included within the newly established Central Historic Core conservation area. No. 37 is now occupied by Jigsaw, a clothing shop. It stands between No. 35, also listed at Grade II*, and the Grade-II listed No. 39.

== Architecture ==
The building has an orange‑brick front with a timber shopfront, a timber cornice at the eaves, and a pantile roof. It has three storeys with four windows across the front. The shopfront is set between panelled pilasters with decorative brackets at the top. Stone steps lead to a pair of glazed doors under a fanlight set within a round‑arched frame, with a band of moulding at the springing point. On either side are shallow bow windows with small panes, each beneath a shaped frieze with carved stops. Above the doors is a decorative cartouche.

To the right is a separate entrance framed by fluted columns with a curved frieze above. The door has six panelled sections and a radial fanlight set within a panelled round arch, again with a moulded band at the springing point. The space above the arch contains a carved mask with garlands.

The first‑floor windows are 12‑pane sashes with a lead‑covered sill band. The second‑floor windows are nine‑pane sashes of unequal size with painted stone sills. All the windows sit beneath flat brick arches, and those on the top floor are partly covered by a moulded cornice with small brackets.

=== Interior ===
Inside, slender fluted columns carry the ground‑floor ceiling. At the rear, an extension is lit from above by a domed roof light.

== See also ==
- Grade II* listed buildings in the City of York
- Listed buildings in York (within the city walls, northern part)
