= 37–38 The Shambles =

Listed building in York, England

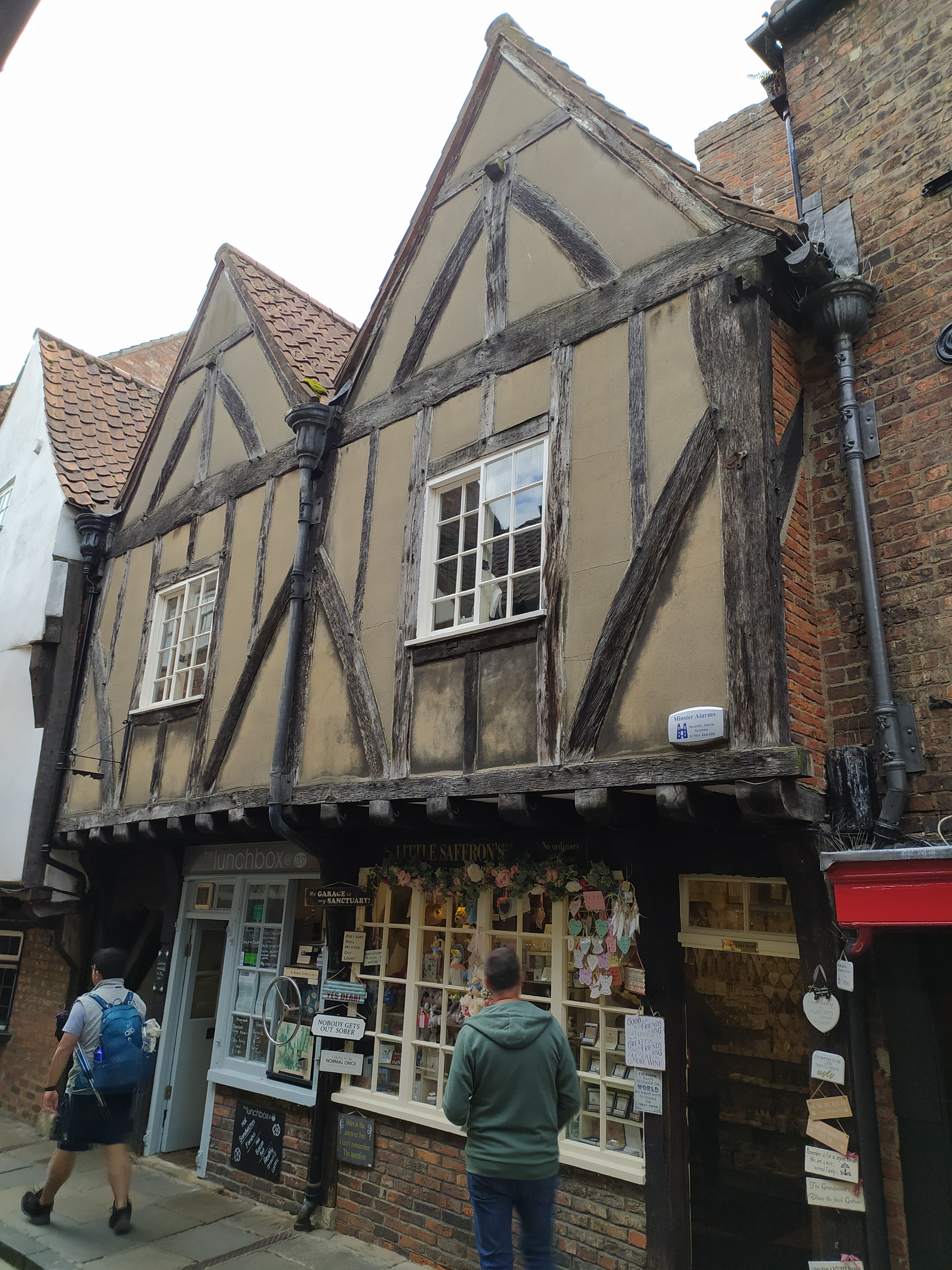
- The buildings in 2020
- Interactive map of the 37–38 The Shambles area

General information
- Location: 37–38 The Shambles, York, England
- Coordinates: 53°57′34″N 1°04′49″W
- Completed: Late 15th century
- Renovated: 17th century (extended) c. 1954 (renovated)

Design and construction
- Designations

Listed Building – Grade II*
- Official name: 37 and 38, Shambles
- Designated: 14 June 1954
- Reference no.: 1256643

37–38 The Shambles is a historic pair of buildings in York, England. Grade II* listed, parts of the structures date to the late 15th century, with extensions added in the 17th century. They were both renovated around 1954, including some rebuilding work.

As of 2025, No. 37 is occupied by The Cheesecake Guy and No. 38 by Little Saffrons.

== Gallery ==
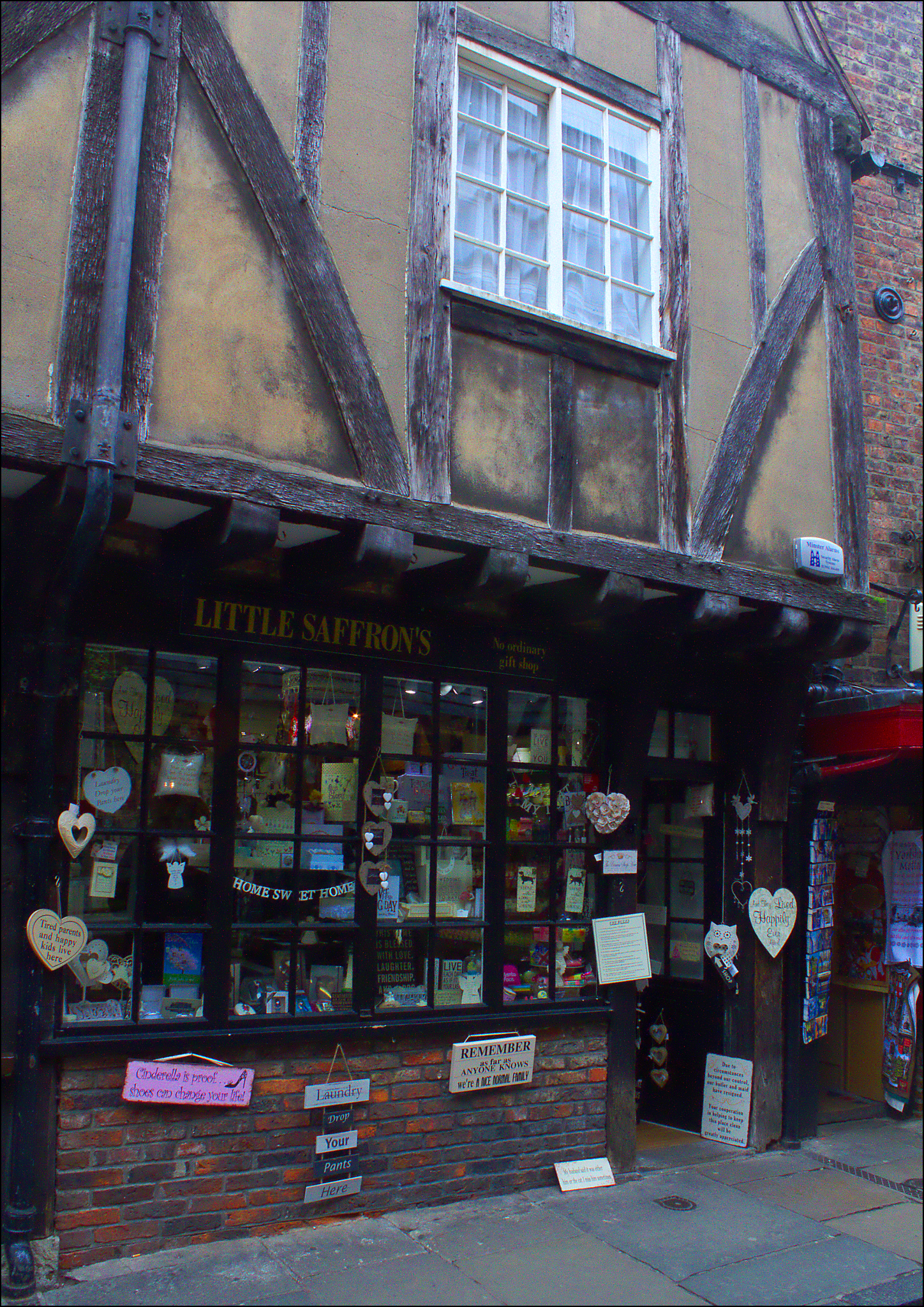
No. 38 in detail (2014)

== See also ==
- Grade II* listed buildings in the City of York
- Listed buildings in York (within the city walls, northern part)
