= 18 and 19 Colliergate =

Listed building in York, England

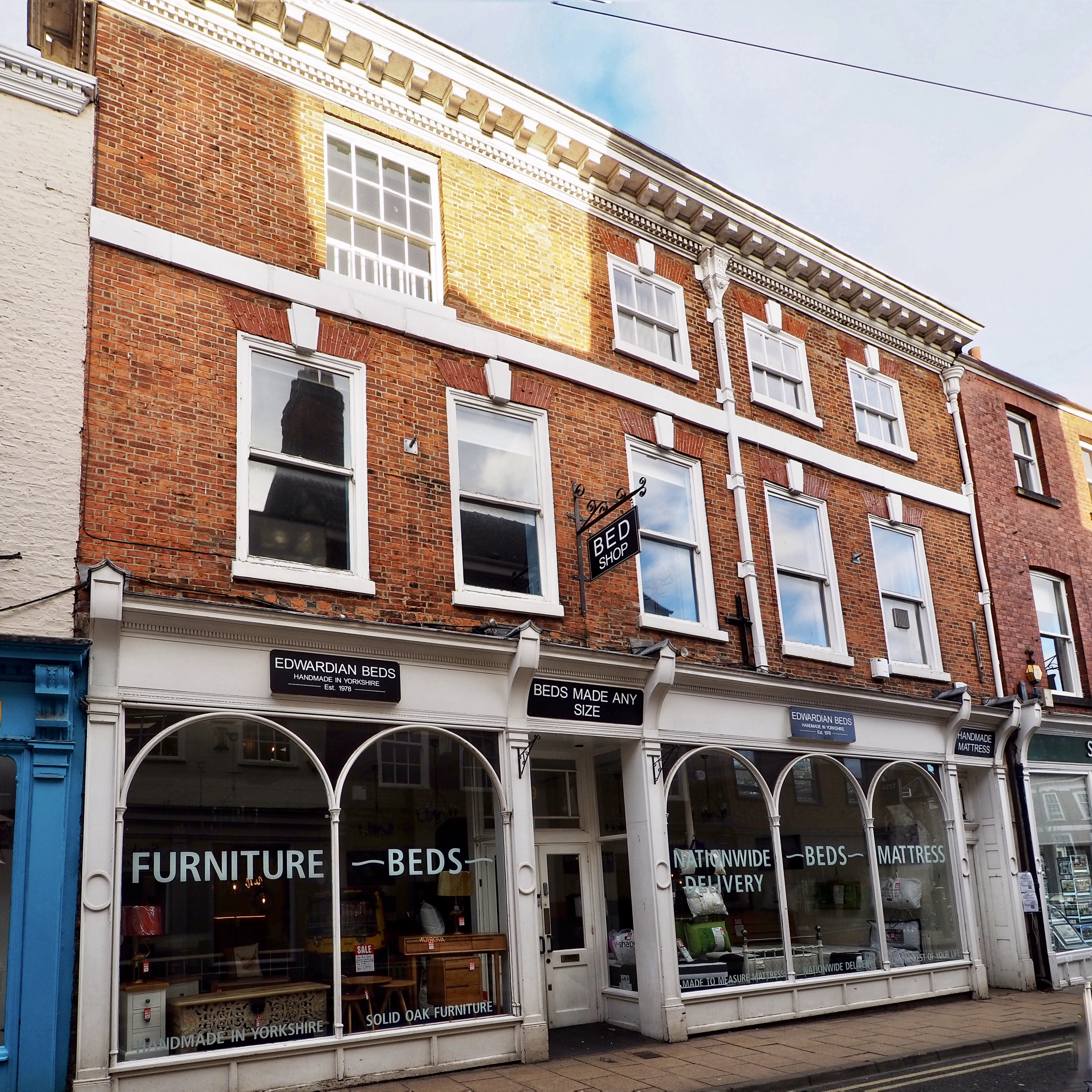
- The building in 2024

- Location within York City Centre

General information
- Location: Colliergate, York, England
- Coordinates: 53°57′34″N 1°04′45″W
- Year built: 1748
- Renovated: c. 1830 (altered, subdivided, partly raised); 20th century (altered, new shopfront); 1963 (partly rebuilt); 2026 (partly converted)
- Client: Ralph Yoward

Design and construction
- Designations

Listed Building – Grade II*
- Official name: 18 and 19, Colliergate
- Designated: 14 June 1954
- Reference no.: 1259174

18 and 19 Colliergate is a historic building in the city centre of York, England.

The building was constructed in 1748, as a house for Ralph Yoward. In 1830, it was divided into two tenements, an extra storey was added to the rear of the north half, and the interior was largely refitted. A shopfront was inserted on the ground floor in the early 20th century, and in 1963 the southeast corner was rebuilt. In the early 21st century, the building was occupied by a careers service. In 2026, the upper floors were converted into two apartments, while the ground floor and basement were retained in commercial use. The building has been Grade II* listed since 1954, and Nikolaus Pevsner describes it as the best building on Colliergate.

The building is constructed of orange brick, with dressings of painted stone, a timber cornice with dentils and modillions, and a pantile roof. It has three storeys with a basement, and the front is five bays wide. The windows are sashes with painted stone sills, the staircase window at the rear having a round head. There is a stone band at second floor level. The original drainpipe survives on the front, with a hopper depicting a cherub's head, and embossed with the date 1748 and initials RY.

Inside, the original staircase hall has been removed, but the staircase at the rear survives, as does the former servants' staircase above the first floor. The north rear room has an early-19th century fireplace and plasterwork, while there is a large fireplace in a basement room which was originally the kitchen. Several rooms on the upper floors have early fireplaces, woodwork and plasterwork, the most impressive being the first floor saloon, with a fireplace to a design by Batty Langley.

== See also ==
- Grade II* listed buildings in the City of York
- Listed buildings in York (within the city walls, northern part)
