= 2, 3, 4 and 4A Precentor's Court =

Listed building in York, England

2, 3, 4, and 4A Precentor's Court
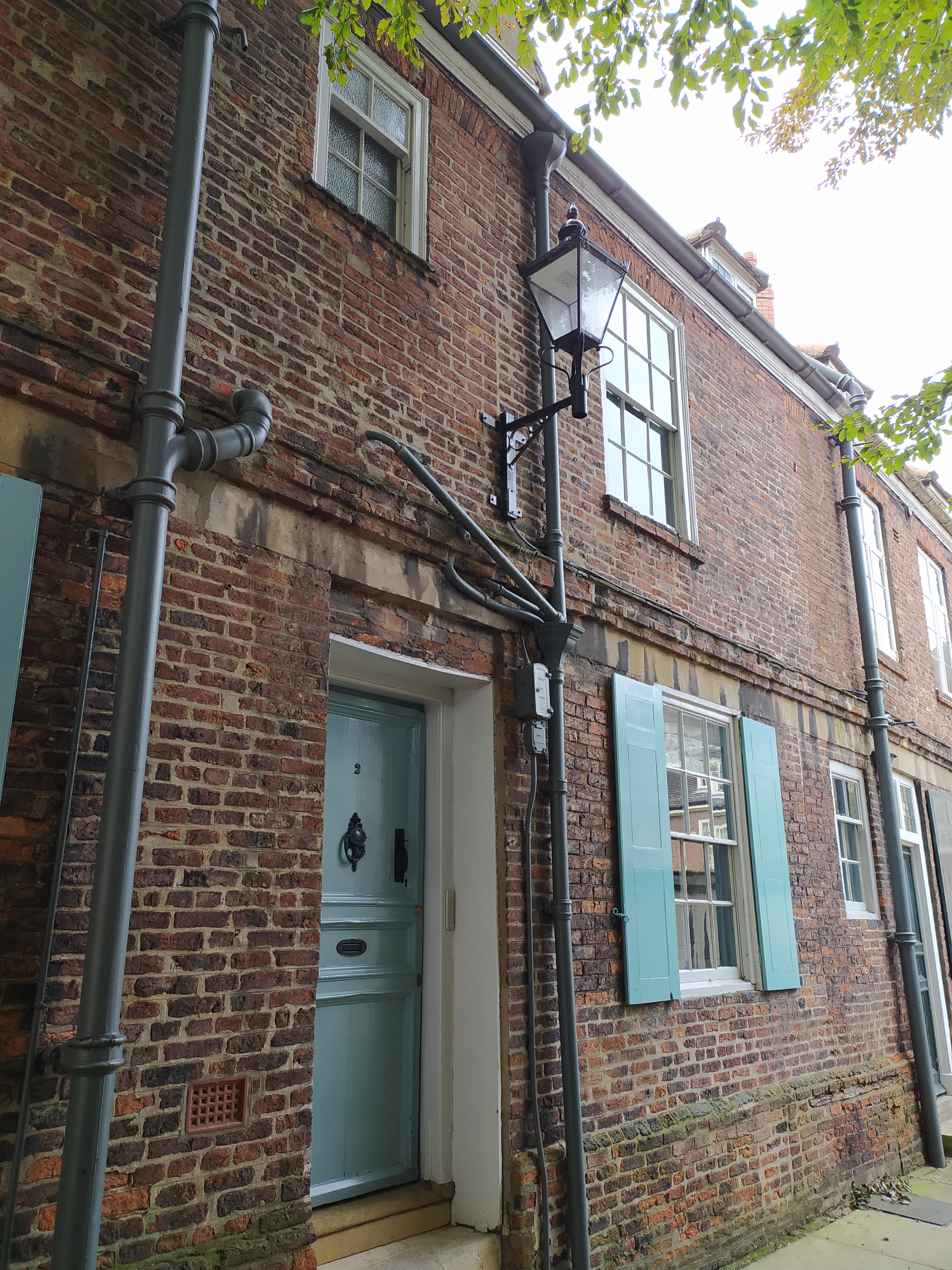
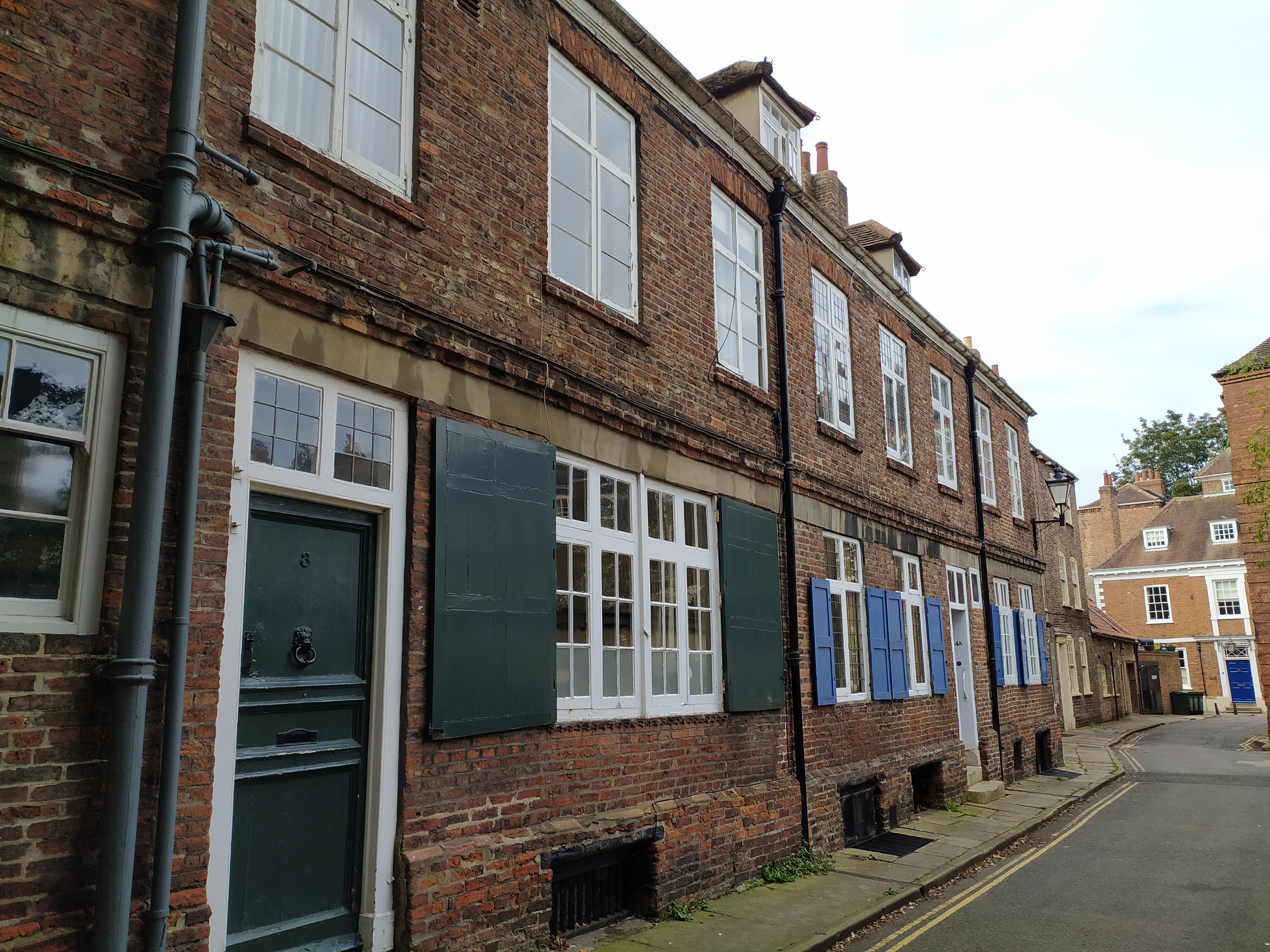
- No. 2 in 2020 Nos. 3, 4 and 4A in 2020
- Interactive map of the 2, 3, 4, and 4A Precentor's Court area

General information
- Location: Precentor's Court, York, England
- Coordinates: 53°57′44″N 1°05′02″W
- Completed: c. 1710

Technical details
- Floor count: 2 + cellar + attic

Design and construction
- Designations

Listed Building – Grade II*
- Official name: 2, 3, 4, and 4a, Precentor's Court
- Designated: 14 June 1954
- Reference no.: 1256904

2, 3, 4, and 4A Precentor's Court is a historic row of three buildings in the city of York, North Yorkshire, England. Grade II*-listed and standing on Precentor's Court, the buildings date to around 1710.

Police constable William Gladin was living at No. 2 in 1872, while cobbler William Bowes was at No. 3.

== See also ==
- Grade II* listed buildings in the City of York
- Listed buildings in York (within the city walls, northern part)
