= 5 High Petergate =

Listed building in York, England

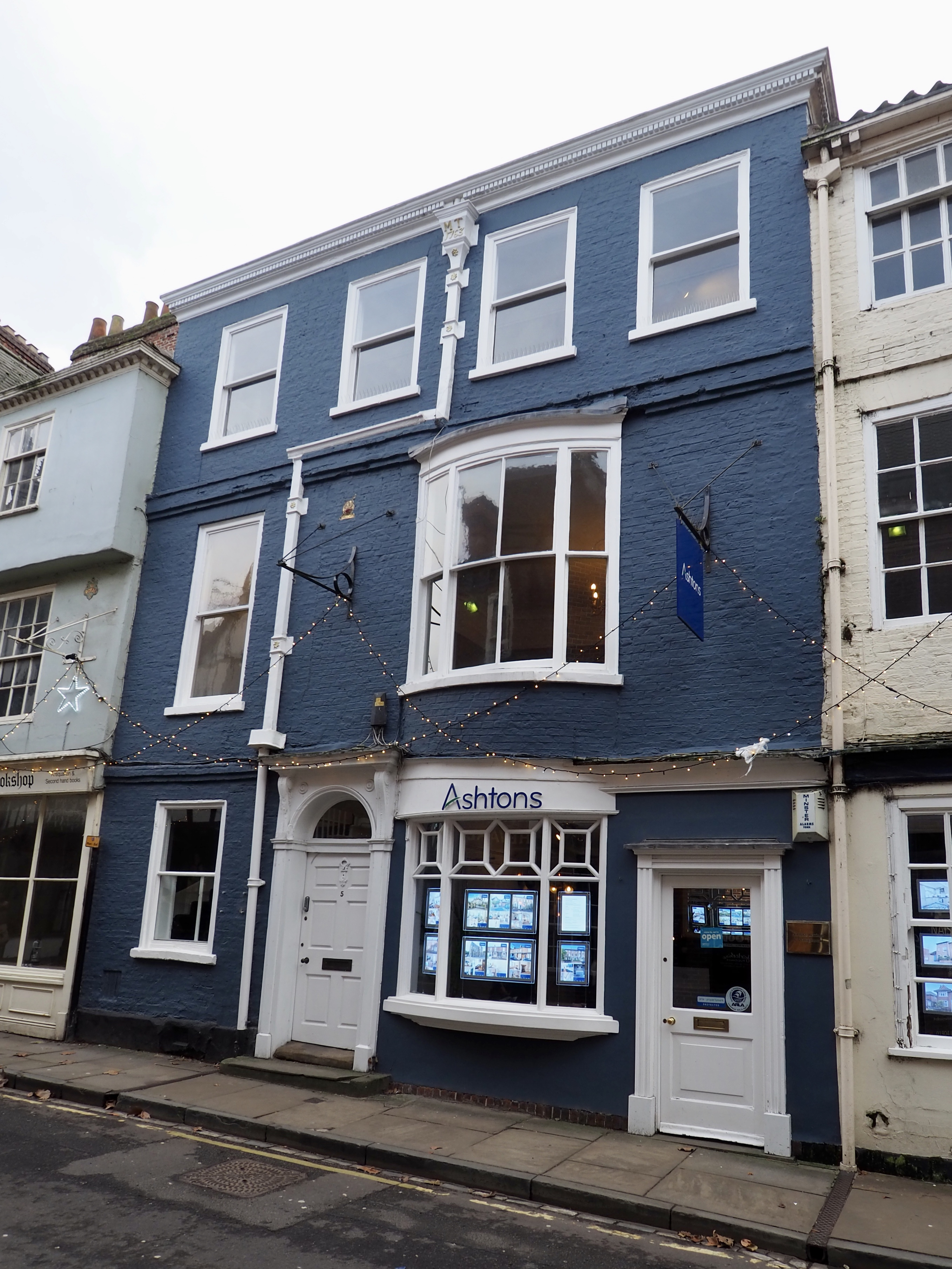
- The building in 2023
- Interactive map of the 5 High Petergate area

General information
- Location: High Petergate, York, England
- Coordinates: 53°57′45″N 1°05′05″W
- Completed: c. 1700; 326 years ago
- Renovated: Early 19th century (altered and extended); 20th century (shopfront)

Technical details
- Floor count: 3

Design and construction
- Designations

Listed Building – Grade II*
- Official name: 5 and 5A, High Petergate
- Designated: 14 June 1954
- Reference no.: 1257617

5 High Petergate (officially listed as 5 and 5A High Petergate) is a historic building in the city centre of York, England.

It originated as a three-storey timber-framed building, constructed in about 1600. In about 1700, it was rebuilt in brick, retaining three storeys, and also having attics and a cellar. In the early 19th century, extensions were added at the rear, while in the 20th century, a shopfront was inserted at ground floor level, facing onto Low Petergate. The building was Grade II* listed in 1954.

The brick front is limewashed. It is topped by a cornice, with a drainpipe head in the centre, dated 1763. Inside, much early plasterwork survives. The building's main staircase dates from the early 19th century, while its rear staircase is late 18th century. The front room on the first floor is panelled, and has pilasters of the Ionic order flanking the fireplace.

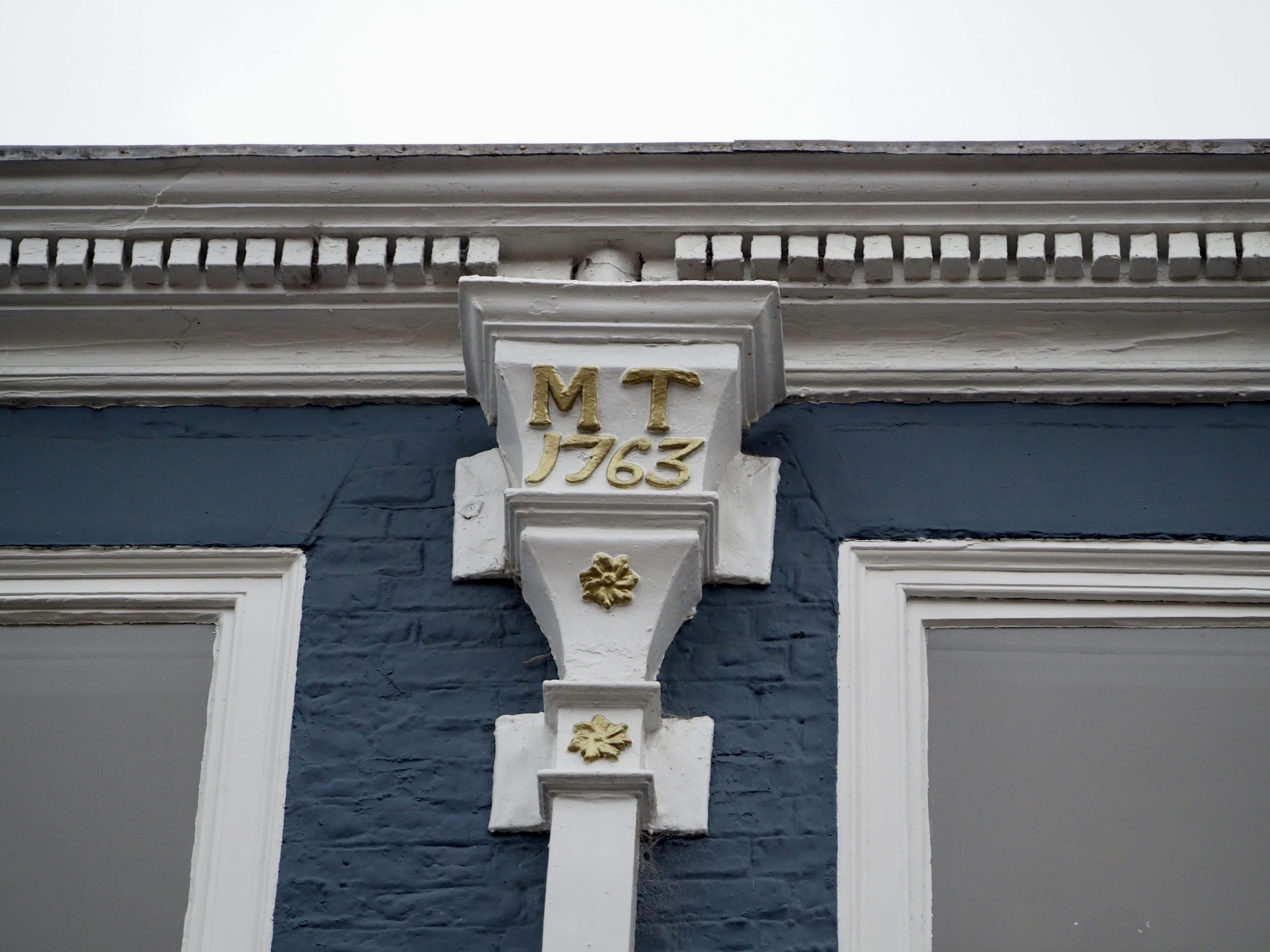
The drainpipe head

== See also ==
- Grade II* listed buildings in the City of York
- Listed buildings in York (within the city walls, northern part)
