= 16–22 Coney Street =

Listed building in York, England

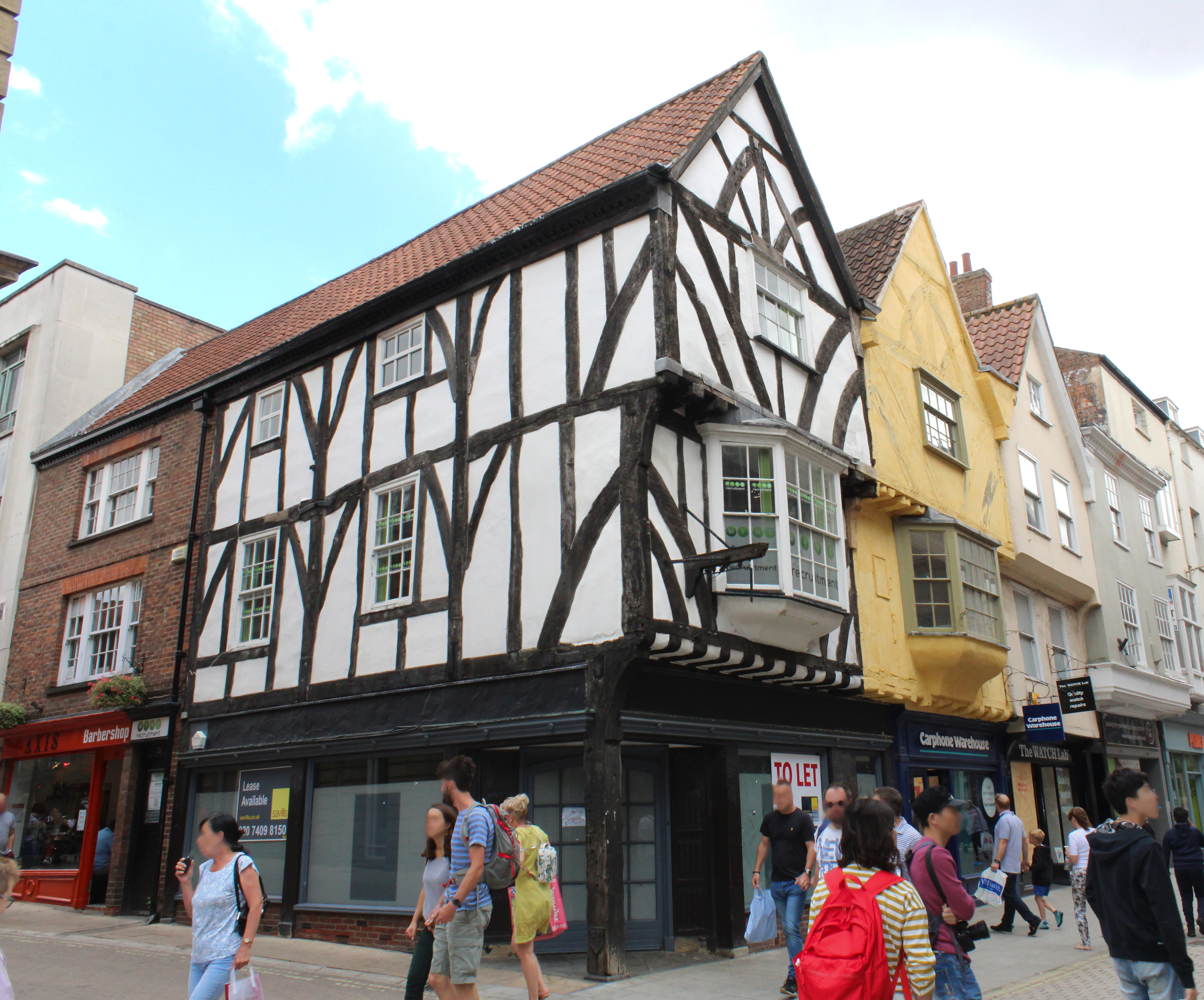
- The building in 2018
- Interactive map of the 16–22 Coney Street area

General information
- Location: Coney Street, York, England
- Coordinates: 53°57′33″N 1°05′02″W
- Completed: c. 1500
- Renovated: 18th century (altered); 19th century (Nos. 20 and 22 extended); 20th century (modernised, rear of No. 16 extended)

Technical details
- Floor count: 3 + attic

Design and construction
- Designations

Listed Building – Grade II*
- Official name: 16–22, Coney Street
- Designated: 14 June 1954
- Reference no.: 1257978

16–22 Coney Street is a historic terrace of shops in the city centre of York, England.

The terrace was built in about 1500 as three timber-framed houses, with their gable ends facing onto Coney Street. In the 18th century, the windows were altered, and the front was plastered over. In the 19th century, a brick extension was added at the rear of Nos. 20 and 22. At that time, Nos. 16 and 18 were a well-known bookshop run by Henry Sotheran.

In 1927, Nos. 16 and 18 were renovated, with the plaster removed, new windows added in a historic style, and an extension added at the rear. In 1954, the whole terrace was Grade II* listed. In 1960, they were renovated again, and modern-style windows put in.

Inside, Nos. 16 and 18 have an early 19th-century staircase. No. 20 has many early 19th-century fittings and a fireplace surround from the second quarter of the 18th century. No. 22 has two early 17th-century doors. Its upper floors are accessed by a staircase in 24 Coney Street, which is 18th-century.

The Romantic poet Percy Bysshe Shelley stayed in No. 20 briefly in Autumn 1811, alongside his first wife Harriet (née Westbrook) and friend Thomas Jefferson Hogg.

== See also ==
- Grade II* listed buildings in the City of York
- Listed buildings in York (within the city walls, northern part)
