= Grade II* listed buildings in the City of York =

There are over 20,000 Grade II* listed buildings in England. This page is a list of these buildings in the district of the City of York in North Yorkshire.

== List of buildings ==
Name	Location	Type	Completed (Note: The date given is the date used by Historic England as significant for the initial building or that of an important part in the structure's description.)	Date designated	Grid ref. (Note: The grid reference is based on the British national grid reference system, sometimes known as OSGB36, used by the Ordnance Survey.) Geo-coordinates	Entry number (Note: The "List Entry Number" is a unique number assigned to each listed building and scheduled monument by Historic England.)	Image
The Roman Bath public house	9 St Sampson's Square, York	Bath house	4th century	14 June 1954	SE6034751934; 53°57′36″N 1°04′54″W	1256732	The Roman Bath public house More images
Church of All Saints	Church Lane, Huntington	Church	12th century	30 January 1987	SE6149356154; 53°59′52″N 1°03′48″W	1315972	Church of All Saints More images
Church of St Everilda	Church Lane, Nether Poppleton	Church	12th century	15 March 1966	SE5644955046; 53°59′18″N 1°08′26″W	1293607	Church of St Everilda More images
Church of St Nicholas	Church Street, Dunnington	Church	12th century	17 November 1966	SE6681852708; 53°57′58″N 0°58′59″W	1148552	Church of St Nicholas More images
St Oswald's Hall	St Oswald's Road, Fulford	Church	12th century	17 January 1973	SE6042949644; 53°56′22″N 1°04′51″W	1316301	St Oswald's Hall More images
Church of St Mary	Jackson's Walk, Askham Richard	Church	Late 12th century	12 July 1985	SE5369748013; 53°55′32″N 1°11′02″W	1316686	Church of St Mary More images
9 Tower Place	York	Tower	c. 1250	14 June 1954	SE6036951390; 53°57′18″N 1°04′53″W	1256415	9 Tower Place More images
Bedern Chapel	Bedern, York	Chapel	1252	14 June 1954	SE6050952139; 53°57′42″N 1°04′45″W	1259537	Bedern Chapel More images
2 College Street	York	House	Late 13th or early 14th century	14 June 1954	SE6042852204; 53°57′45″N 1°04′50″W	1259189	2 College Street More images
54, 56, and 58 Stonegate	York	House	Early 14th century	14 June 1954	SE6028452086; 53°57′41″N 1°04′58″W	1256493	54, 56, and 58 Stonegate More images
Bedern Hall	Bedern, York	Guildhall	Mid-14th century	24 June 1983	SE6052652108; 53°57′41″N 1°04′44″W	1259538	Bedern Hall More images
30 and 32 Goodramgate, 11 and 12 College Street	York	House	14th century	14 June 1954	SE6048652165; 53°57′43″N 1°04′47″W	1257731	30 and 32 Goodramgate, 11 and 12 College Street More images
60 Stonegate, 33, 33A and 35 High Petergate	York	House	14th century	14 June 1954	SE6028852095; 53°57′41″N 1°04′57″W	1257580	60 Stonegate, 33, 33A and 35 High Petergate More images
St Mary's Abbey remains: Hospitium and Watergate	York Museum Gardens	Abbey	14th century	14 June 1954	SE5984652065; 53°57′40″N 1°05′22″W	1257129	St Mary's Abbey remains: Hospitium and Watergate More images
1, 2, 2A and 3 Minster Court	York	House	14th–16th century	14 June 1954	SE6037052300; 53°57′48″N 1°04′53″W	1257243	1, 2, 2A and 3 Minster Court More images
Church of St Helen	St Helen's Square, York	Church	14th–16th century; 1857 (rebuilt)	14 June 1954	SE6020551970; 53°57′37″N 1°05′02″W	1256800	Church of St Helen More images
2 Jubbergate	York	House	Late 14th century	14 June 1954	SE6041251873; 53°57′34″N 1°04′51″W	1257555	2 Jubbergate More images
41 and 43 Low Petergate	York	House	Late 14th century	14 June 1954	SE6031152081; 53°57′41″N 1°04′56″W	1257454	41 and 43 Low Petergate More images
Shrine of St Margaret Clitherow	35 The Shambles, York	House	Late 14th century	14 June 1954	SE6045551857; 53°57′33″N 1°04′48″W	1256688	Shrine of St Margaret Clitherow More images
Bowes Morrell House	111 Walmgate, York	House	c. 1400	14 June 1954	SE6094651471; 53°57′21″N 1°04′22″W	1256310	Bowes Morrell House More images
79 Low Petergate	York	House	Early 15th century	14 June 1954	SE6036952015; 53°57′39″N 1°04′53″W	1257424	79 Low Petergate More images
13 Stonegate	York	House	Early 15th century	14 June 1954	SE6022552010; 53°57′38″N 1°05′01″W	1256509	13 Stonegate More images
Parish room of St Crux and wall attached to north-west corner	The Shambles, York	Parish hall	Early 15th century	14 June 1954	SE6049751832; 53°57′33″N 1°04′46″W	1256664	Parish room of St Crux and wall attached to north-west corner More images
7 and 8 Shambles	York	House	Early 15th century (No. 8); late 15th century (No. 7)	14 June 1954	SE6045651895; 53°57′35″N 1°04′48″W	1256674	7 and 8 Shambles More images
Church of St Martin le Grand	Coney Street, York	Church	Early 15th century; 1853–54 (partly rebuilt)	14 June 1954	SE6016251856; 53°57′33″N 1°05′05″W	1257963	Church of St Martin le Grand More images
1 Minster Gates, 38 High Petergate	York	Shop	15th century	14 June 1954	SE6029152110; 53°57′42″N 1°04′57″W	1257244	1 Minster Gates, 38 High Petergate More images
Number 5 and attached front garden railings	Minster Yard, York	House	15th century	14 June 1954	SE6041952204; 53°57′45″N 1°04′50″W	1257255	Number 5 and attached front garden railings More images
9 Shambles	York	House	15th century	14 June 1954	SE6045951890; 53°57′34″N 1°04′48″W	1256675	9 Shambles More images
10 and 11 Shambles	York	House	15th century	14 June 1954	SE6046351882; 53°57′34″N 1°04′48″W	1256676	10 and 11 Shambles More images
10 Precentor's Court	York	House	15th century	14 June 1954	SE6017652254; 53°57′46″N 1°05′03″W	1256869	10 Precentor's Court More images
77 Walmgate	York	Shop	15th century	14 June 1954	SE6084351533; 53°57′23″N 1°04′27″W	1256351	77 Walmgate More images
81 Low Petergate	York	House	15th century	14 June 1954	SE6038152010; 53°57′38″N 1°04′52″W	1257389	81 Low Petergate More images
Church of St Andrew Evangelical Church	St Andrewgate, York	Church	15th century	14 June 1954	SE6056752034; 53°57′39″N 1°04′42″W	1256792	Church of St Andrew Evangelical Church More images
Mulberry Hall	17–19 Stonegate, York	House	15th century	14 June 1954	SE6024652027; 53°57′39″N 1°05′00″W	1256512	Mulberry Hall More images
Church of St Saviour and attached gates and railings	St Saviourgate, York	Church	15th century	14 June 1954	SE6059051890; 53°57′34″N 1°04′41″W	1256707	Church of St Saviour and attached gates and railings More images
11 Lady Peckett's Yard	York	House	15th century; c. 1700 (rebuilt)	14 June 1954	SE6050351758; 53°57′30″N 1°04′46″W	1257535	11 Lady Peckett's Yard More images
39 North Street, 1 Tanner Row	York	House	Late 15th century	19 August 1971	SE6004251793; 53°57′31″N 1°05′11″W	1257066	39 North Street, 1 Tanner Row More images
12 and 12A Shambles	York	House	Late 15th century	14 June 1954	SE6046451878; 53°57′34″N 1°04′48″W	1256677	12 and 12A Shambles More images
26 Coppergate	York	House	Late 15th century	14 June 1954	SE6044351715; 53°57′29″N 1°04′49″W	1257900	26 Coppergate More images
41 and 42 Shambles	York	Workshop	Late 15th century	14 June 1954	SE6044851878; 53°57′34″N 1°04′49″W	1256657	41 and 42 Shambles More images
44 Shambles	York	House	Late 15th century	1 July 1968	SE6043851895; 53°57′35″N 1°04′49″W	1256659	44 Shambles More images
52 Stonegate	York	House	Late 15th century	14 June 1954	SE6027452080; 53°57′41″N 1°04′58″W	1256492	52 Stonegate More images
Church Cottages	1–2 All Saints Lane, York	House	Late 15th century	14 June 1954	SE6005851776; 53°57′31″N 1°05′10″W	1257063	Church Cottages More images
56, 58 and 60 Low Petergate	York	House	c. 1500	14 June 1954	SE6036552063; 53°57′40″N 1°04′53″W	1257437	56, 58 and 60 Low Petergate More images
85, 87 and 89 Micklegate	York	House	c. 1500	14 June 1954	SE5984651557; 53°57′24″N 1°05′22″W	1257323	85, 87 and 89 Micklegate More images
The Snickleway Inn and attached buildings at rear	47 Goodramgate, York	Public house	c. 1500	14 June 1954	SE6048052102; 53°57′41″N 1°04′47″W	1257742	The Snickleway Inn and attached buildings at rear More images
7 St Sampson's Square	York	House	Early 16th century (probable)	19 August 1971	SE6032251926; 53°57′36″N 1°04′56″W	1256731	7 St Sampson's Square More images
Skelton Manor	Church Lane, Skelton	House	Mid-16th century	29 January 1953	SE5682056601; 54°00′08″N 1°08′05″W	1149145	Skelton Manor More images
67 Micklegate	York	House	Mid-16th century	14 June 1954	SE5992351610; 53°57′26″N 1°05′18″W	1257308	67 Micklegate More images
70 and 72 Micklegate	York	House	16th century	14 June 1954	SE5990851636; 53°57′26″N 1°05′19″W	1257313	70 and 72 Micklegate More images
Former Church of St John the Evangelist	Micklegate, York	Church	16th century	14 June 1954	SE6011251652; 53°57′27″N 1°05′07″W	1257279	Former Church of St John the Evangelist More images
Heslington Hall	University Road, Heslington	House	1565–68	1 November 1955	SE6264850376; 53°56′45″N 1°02′49″W	1148497	Heslington Hall More images
21 and 25 Stonegate	York	House	Late 16th century	14 June 1954	SE6025852038; 53°57′39″N 1°04′59″W	1256514	21 and 25 Stonegate More images
73, 75 and 77 Low Petergate	York	House	Late 16th century	14 June 1954	SE6037052028; 53°57′39″N 1°04′53″W	1257419	73, 75 and 77 Low Petergate More images
6 Patrick Pool	York	Shop	c. 1600	25 March 1950	SE6040851906; 53°57′35″N 1°04′51″W	1256976	6 Patrick Pool More images
48 and 50 Stonegate	York	House	c. 1600	14 June 1954	SE6026852073; 53°57′40″N 1°04′59″W	1256490	48 and 50 Stonegate More images
4 and 4A Stonegate	York	House	Early 17th century	24 June 1983	SE6018951997; 53°57′38″N 1°05′03″W	1256568	4 and 4A Stonegate More images
28, 30 and 32 Coppergate	York	House	Early 17th century	14 June 1954	SE6044751726; 53°57′29″N 1°04′49″W	1257901	28, 30 and 32 Coppergate More images
33 Stonegate	York	House	Early 17th century	14 June 1954	SE6027052051; 53°57′40″N 1°04′58″W	1256522	33 Stonegate More images
49 Stonegate	York	House	Early 17th century	14 June 1954	SE6030352084; 53°57′41″N 1°04′57″W	1256491	49 Stonegate More images
55 Low Petergate	York	House	Early 17th century	14 June 1954	SE6033352066; 53°57′40″N 1°04′55″W	1257435	55 Low Petergate More images
York College for Girls	64–66 Low Petergate, York	House	Early 17th century	14 June 1954	SE6039752024; 53°57′39″N 1°04′52″W	1257411	York College for Girls More images
The Black Swan public house	23 Peasholme Green, York	House	Early 17th century	14 June 1954	SE6074551949; 53°57′36″N 1°04′32″W	1256886	The Black Swan public house More images
69 and 71 Micklegate	York	House	Early 17th century; c. 1745 (largely rebuilt)	14 June 1954	SE5991751606; 53°57′25″N 1°05′18″W	1257312	69 and 71 Micklegate More images
Ingram House	90 Bootham, York	House	1630–1640	14 June 1954	SE5977652530; 53°57′55″N 1°05′25″W	1259395	Ingram House More images
The Dutch House	2 Ogleforth, York	House	c. 1650	14 June 1954	SE6050952210; 53°57′45″N 1°04′45″W	1257039	The Dutch House More images
Kexby Old Bridge	Old Bridge Street, Kexby	Bridge	1650	1 June 1971	SE7053151080; 53°57′04″N 0°55′36″W	1309914	Kexby Old Bridge More images
Number 68 and verandah railings attached at rear	Micklegate, York	House	Mid-17th century	1 July 1968	SE5991451639; 53°57′27″N 1°05′18″W	1257309	Number 68 and verandah railings attached at rear More images
Gatehouse to Merchant Adventurers' Hall	39–41 Fossgate, York	Gatehouse	Mid-17th century	14 June 1954	SE6055851730; 53°57′29″N 1°04′43″W	1257822	Gatehouse to Merchant Adventurers' Hall More images
The Blue Bell	52–54 Fossgate, York	Public house	Mid-17th century	14 June 1954	SE6051751793; 53°57′31″N 1°04′45″W	1257825	The Blue Bell More images
31 Stonegate	York	House	Late 17th century	14 June 1954	SE6026752045; 53°57′40″N 1°04′59″W	1256520	31 Stonegate More images
35 Stonegate	York	House	Late 17th century	1 July 1968	SE6027552054; 53°57′40″N 1°04′58″W	1256524	35 Stonegate More images
43 Stonegate	York	House	Late 17th century	14 June 1954	SE6029552074; 53°57′40″N 1°04′57″W	1256487	43 Stonegate More images
37 and 38 Shambles	York	House	Late 17th century	14 June 1954	SE6045151862; 53°57′34″N 1°04′49″W	1256643	37 and 38 Shambles More images
39 Shambles	York	House	Late 17th century	14 June 1954	SE6044851869; 53°57′34″N 1°04′49″W	1256644	39 Shambles More images
49 Bootham and attached railings	York	House	Late 17th century	14 June 1954	SE5997452386; 53°57′51″N 1°05′14″W	1259465	49 Bootham and attached railings More images
64 and 66 Clifton	York	House	Late 17th century	14 June 1954	SE5952752832; 53°58′05″N 1°05′39″W	1259226	64 and 66 Clifton More images
33–37 Micklegate	York	House	Late 17th century	19 August 1971	SE6003951618; 53°57′26″N 1°05′11″W	1257364	33–37 Micklegate More images
102 and 104 Micklegate	York	House	Late 17th century	19 August 1971	SE5982551581; 53°57′25″N 1°05′23″W	1257300	102 and 104 Micklegate More images
122, 124, and 126 Micklegate	York	House	Late 17th and early 18th century	1 July 1968	SE5978751545; 53°57′24″N 1°05′25″W	1257267	122, 124, and 126 Micklegate More images
144, 146 and 148 Micklegate	York	House	Late 17th century	24 June 1983	SE5976651514; 53°57′23″N 1°05′26″W	1257272	144, 146 and 148 Micklegate More images
Sutton Bridge	B1228, Elvington	Bridge	Late 17th century	25 October 1951	SE7048047663; 53°55′13″N 0°55′42″W	1148519	Sutton Bridge More images
The Old Rectory	7A Tanner Row, York	House	Late 17th century	14 June 1954	SE6002751779; 53°57′31″N 1°05′12″W	1256470	The Old Rectory More images
St Saviourgate Unitarian Chapel	St Saviourgate, York	Chapel	1692	14 June 1954	SE6062151975; 53°57′37″N 1°04′39″W	1256710	St Saviourgate Unitarian Chapel More images
Judges Court and attached front steps and railings	Coney Street, York	House	Before 18th century	19 August 1971	SE6023451843; 53°57′33″N 1°05′01″W	1257937	Judges Court and attached front steps and railings More images
5 and 5A High Petergate	York	House	c. 1700	14 June 1954	SE6014252208; 53°57′45″N 1°05′05″W	1257617	5 and 5A High Petergate More images
68 and 70 Walmgate	York	House	c. 1700	19 August 1971	SE6077751588; 53°57′25″N 1°04′31″W	1256346	68 and 70 Walmgate More images
Cromwell House	13 Ogleforth, York	House	c. 1700	14 June 1954	SE6049252239; 53°57′46″N 1°04′46″W	1257048	Cromwell House More images
Middlethorpe Hall	Bishopthorpe Road, Bishopthorpe	Country house	c. 1700	14 June 1954	SE5984948660; 53°55′50″N 1°05′24″W	1259554	Middlethorpe Hall More images
Middleton House	38 Monkgate, York	House	c. 1700	14 June 1954	SE6070352343; 53°57′49″N 1°04′34″W	1257207	Middleton House More images
Youngs Hotel (Number 25)	25–29 High Petergate, York	House	1700–1707	14 June 1954	SE6025952112; 53°57′42″N 1°04′59″W	1257610	Youngs Hotel (Number 25) More images
Fenton House	9 Precentor's Court, York	House	c. 1705	14 June 1954	SE6015652236; 53°57′46″N 1°05′05″W	1256868	Fenton House More images
2, 3, 4 and 4A Precentor's Court	York	House	Early 18th century	14 June 1954	SE6020052203; 53°57′45″N 1°05′02″W	1256904	2, 3, 4 and 4A Precentor's Court More images
5 Precentor's Court	York	House	Early 18th century	14 June 1954	SE6018552209; 53°57′45″N 1°05′03″W	1256864	5 Precentor's Court More images
4 Minster Yard and attached garden wall, gate and railings at front and back	York	House	Early 18th century	14 June 1954	SE6041152218; 53°57′45″N 1°04′51″W	1257254	4 Minster Yard and attached garden wall, gate and railings at front and back More images
6 Minster Yard	York	House	Early 18th century	14 June 1954	SE6041852161; 53°57′43″N 1°04′50″W	1257256	6 Minster Yard More images
9 High Petergate and attached outbuildings	York	House	Early 18th century	14 June 1954	SE6015252198; 53°57′45″N 1°05′05″W	1257621	9 High Petergate and attached outbuildings More images
Numbers 10, 12 and 14 and carriage gates attached to number 14	Lendal, York	House	Early 18th century	14 June 1954	SE6008951967; 53°57′37″N 1°05′08″W	1257491	Numbers 10, 12 and 14 and carriage gates attached to number 14 More images
45 and 47 Stonegate	York	House	Early 18th century	14 June 1954	SE6029852076; 53°57′41″N 1°04′57″W	1256489	45 and 47 Stonegate More images
Acomb House and railings and gates attached to front	23 Front Street, Acomb	House	Early 18th century	14 June 1954	SE5738051315; 53°57′17″N 1°07′37″W	1257795	Acomb House and railings and gates attached to front More images
Old Rectory House and attached wall and garage	8 Chapter House Street, York	House	Early 18th century	14 June 1954	SE6044952278; 53°57′47″N 1°04′48″W	1259280	Old Rectory House and attached wall and garage More images
Petergate House	11 High Petergate, York	House	Early 18th century	14 June 1954	SE6016252193; 53°57′44″N 1°05′04″W	1257599	Petergate House More images
Rowntree Park memorial gates	Terry Avenue, York	Gate	Early 18th century	24 June 1983	SE6045950621; 53°56′53″N 1°04′49″W	1256477	Rowntree Park memorial gates More images
26 St Saviourgate	York	House	Early 18th century	14 June 1954	SE6064751952; 53°57′36″N 1°04′38″W	1256699	26 St Saviourgate More images
The Red House and railings attached at front	Duncombe Place, York	House	c. 1714	14 June 1954	SE6012552107; 53°57′42″N 1°05′06″W	1257875	The Red House and railings attached at front More images
The Oliver Sheldon House	17–19 Aldwark, York	House	c. 1720	14 June 1954	SE6062452110; 53°57′42″N 1°04′39″W	1259568	The Oliver Sheldon House More images
York College for Girls	62 Low Petergate, York	House	c. 1725	14 June 1954	SE6037352054; 53°57′40″N 1°04′53″W	1257410	York College for Girls More images
The Little Hall	Heslington	House	1734	17 November 1966	SE6276450243; 53°56′40″N 1°02′43″W	1148493	The Little Hall More images
16–22 St Saviourgate	York	House	c. 1740	14 June 1954	SE6063551938; 53°57′36″N 1°04′39″W	1256697	16–22 St Saviourgate More images
118 and 120 Micklegate	York	House	c. 1740	14 June 1954	SE5979451551; 53°57′24″N 1°05′25″W	1257264	118 and 120 Micklegate More images
Wandesford House	37 Bootham, York	Almshouse	1743	14 June 1954	SE6002452368; 53°57′50″N 1°05′12″W	1259452	Wandesford House More images
Theatre Royal and Undercroft	St Leonard's Place, York	Theatre	1744	14 June 1954	SE6012552132; 53°57′42″N 1°05′06″W	1256767	Theatre Royal and Undercroft More images
3–9 New Street	York	House	1746	14 June 1954	SE6024651882; 53°57′34″N 1°05′00″W	1257093	3–9 New Street More images
18 and 19 Colliergate	York	House	1748	14 June 1954	SE6051151877; 53°57′34″N 1°04′45″W	1259174	18 and 19 Colliergate More images
9, 9A and 11 Stonegate	York	House	Mid-18th century	14 June 1954	SE6022352000; 53°57′38″N 1°05′01″W	1256537	9, 9A and 11 Stonegate More images
15 Stonegate	York	House	Mid-18th century	14 June 1954	SE6023652020; 53°57′39″N 1°05′00″W	1256510	15 Stonegate More images
37 Stonegate	York	House	Mid-18th century	14 June 1954	SE6028552064; 53°57′40″N 1°04′58″W	1256527	37 Stonegate More images
Railings and gate piers approximately 10 metres north-east of No. 26 (Castlegate House)	Castlegate, York	Gate pier	Mid-18th century	24 June 1983	SE6044151585; 53°57′25″N 1°04′49″W	1259339	Railings and gate piers approximately 10 metres north-east of No. 26 (Castlegate House) More images
13 Shambles	York	House	18th century	14 June 1954	SE6046651874; 53°57′34″N 1°04′48″W	1256678	13 Shambles More images
16–22 Coney Street	York	House	18th century	14 June 1954	SE6020451847; 53°57′33″N 1°05′02″W	1257978	16–22 Coney Street More images
44 and 46 Stonegate	York	House	18th century	14 June 1954	SE6025652067; 53°57′40″N 1°04′59″W	1256488	44 and 46 Stonegate More images
53 and 55 Micklegate	York	House	1751	14 June 1954	SE5995251623; 53°57′26″N 1°05′16″W	1257333	53 and 55 Micklegate More images
Peaseholme House	St Saviour's Place, York	House	1752	14 June 1954	SE6068151948; 53°57′36″N 1°04′36″W	1256694	Peaseholme House More images
Pikeing Well	New Walk, York	Wellhead	1752	14 June 1954	SE6058250661; 53°56′55″N 1°04′42″W	1257053	Pikeing Well More images
47 Bootham and attached railings	York	House	1753	14 June 1954	SE5998452381; 53°57′51″N 1°05′14″W	1259463	47 Bootham and attached railings More images
Guinness Bar in the Old Grandstand at York Racecourse	Knavesmire, York	Grandstand	1755	14 June 1954	SE5966049908; 53°56′31″N 1°05′33″W	1257530	Upload Photo
10 Minster Gates	York	House	c. 1755	14 June 1954	SE6032152111; 53°57′42″N 1°04′56″W	1257247	10 Minster Gates More images
The stables to Bishopthorpe Palace	Bishopthorpe Road, Bishopthorpe	Stables	1761–63	12 July 1985	SE5960347831; 53°55′24″N 1°05′38″W	1166711	The stables to Bishopthorpe Palace
24 St Saviourgate	York	House	1763	14 June 1954	SE6063951944; 53°57′36″N 1°04′38″W	1256698	24 St Saviourgate More images
Gatehouse and walls adjoining to Bishopthorpe Palace	Bishopthorpe Road, Bishopthorpe	Gatehouse	1763–65	12 July 1985	SE5963247780; 53°55′22″N 1°05′36″W	1166705	Gatehouse and walls adjoining to Bishopthorpe Palace More images
53 and 55 Bootham and attached railings	York	House	c. 1765	14 June 1954	SE5994252413; 53°57′52″N 1°05′16″W	1259432	53 and 55 Bootham and attached railings More images
Elvington Hall	B1228, Elvington	House	Mid to late 18th century	14 March 1986	SE7007047638; 53°55′13″N 0°56′04″W	1316297	Upload Photo
26 and 28 Gillygate	York	House	1769	14 June 1954	SE6016452331; 53°57′49″N 1°05′04″W	1257782	26 and 28 Gillygate More images
The Adams House	52 Low Petergate, York	House	1772	14 June 1954	SE6034752084; 53°57′41″N 1°04′54″W	1257433	The Adams House More images
Summerhouse approximately 75 metres south-west of the Mount School	Dalton Terrace, York	Summerhouse	c. 1774	24 June 1983	SE5920251047; 53°57′08″N 1°05′58″W	1257913	Upload Photo
Collingwood Hotel	163 Holgate Road, York	House	c. 1775	24 June 1983	SE5875051344; 53°57′18″N 1°06′22″W	1257537	Collingwood Hotel More images
29 Marygate and walls attached to south-west	York	House	Late 18th century	14 June 1954	SE5987552218; 53°57′45″N 1°05′20″W	1257374	29 Marygate and walls attached to south-west More images
Skeldergate House Hotel	56 Skeldergate, York	House	1777–78	14 June 1954	SE6023351414; 53°57′19″N 1°05′01″W	1256636	Skeldergate House Hotel More images
20 St Andrewgate	York	House	c. 1780	14 June 1954	SE6053351999; 53°57′38″N 1°04′44″W	1256788	20 St Andrewgate More images
57 and 59 Micklegate	York	House	1783	14 June 1954	SE5994351619; 53°57′26″N 1°05′17″W	1257340	57 and 59 Micklegate More images
61 Micklegate	York	House	c. 1786	14 June 1954	SE5993651617; 53°57′26″N 1°05′17″W	1257344	61 Micklegate More images
Number 92 and railings attached at front and rear	Micklegate, York	House	c. 1789	14 June 1954	SE5985351593; 53°57′25″N 1°05′22″W	1257288	Number 92 and railings attached at front and rear More images
The Retreat and boundary walls	Heslington Road, York	Hospital	1793–1797	14 June 1954	SE6158350944; 53°57′03″N 1°03′47″W	1257679	The Retreat and boundary walls More images
51 Bootham and Bootham School block to rear including John Bright Library and attached railings	York	House	c. 1804	14 June 1954	SE5996952435; 53°57′52″N 1°05′15″W	1259468	51 Bootham and Bootham School block to rear including John Bright Library and attached railings More images
Bathurst House and railings attached at front	86 Micklegate, York	House	c. 1822	14 June 1954	SE5987351610; 53°57′26″N 1°05′21″W	1257284	Bathurst House and railings attached at front More images
14 Shambles	York	House	Early 19th century	14 June 1954	SE6046451869; 53°57′34″N 1°04′48″W	1256679	14 Shambles More images
Numbers 36–42 (even) including number 38A	Coney Street, York	House	Early 19th century	24 June 1983	SE6023451819; 53°57′32″N 1°05′01″W	1257947	Numbers 36–42 (even) including number 38A More images
Gateway arch about 25 metres south-east of Holy Trinity Church porch	Goodramgate, York	Gate	Early 19th century	14 June 1954	SE6045652020; 53°57′39″N 1°04′48″W	1257695	Gateway arch about 25 metres south-east of Holy Trinity Church porch More images
Foss Bridge	Fossgate, York	Bridge	1811–12	14 June 1954	SE6059751691; 53°57′28″N 1°04′41″W	1257827	Foss Bridge More images
The Churchill	65 Bootham, York	House	c. 1827	19 August 1971	SE5981952562; 53°57′56″N 1°05′23″W	1259444	The Churchill More images
Lady Anne Middleton's Hotel and attached garden walls	Skeldergate, York	Hospital	1829	14 June 1954	SE6019551410; 53°57′19″N 1°05′03″W	1256639	Lady Anne Middleton's Hotel and attached garden walls More images
8 Stonegate	York	House	c. 1830	14 June 1954	SE6019652002; 53°57′38″N 1°05′03″W	1256536	8 Stonegate More images
Numbers 1–9 (consecutive) and railings attached to front wall	St Leonard's Place, York	House	1834	14 June 1954	SE6007852161; 53°57′43″N 1°05′09″W	1256761	Numbers 1–9 (consecutive) and railings attached to front wall More images
De Grey House and attached front railings, gate and lamp standard	St Leonard's Place, York	House	1835	1 July 1968	SE6011652185; 53°57′44″N 1°05′07″W	1256764	De Grey House and attached front railings, gate and lamp standard More images
York Cemetery Chapel	Cemetery Road, York	Cemetery chapel	1837	1 July 1968	SE6107550824; 53°57′00″N 1°04′15″W	1259304	York Cemetery Chapel More images
Central Methodist Church and attached ancillary buildings	St Saviourgate, York	Church	1840	1 July 1968	SE6054051896; 53°57′35″N 1°04′44″W	1256705	Central Methodist Church and attached ancillary buildings More images
54 Bootham and attached railings	York	House	c. 1840	14 June 1954	SE5993152383; 53°57′51″N 1°05′17″W	1259435	54 Bootham and attached railings More images
Old station and former Station Hotel	Toft Green, York	Railway station	1840–41	20 December 1974	SE5985051741; 53°57′30″N 1°05′22″W	1256403	Old station and former Station Hotel More images
De Grey Rooms and attached gates, railings and lamp standards	St Leonard's Place, York	Gate	1841–42	14 June 1954	SE6011652202; 53°57′45″N 1°05′07″W	1256766	De Grey Rooms and attached gates, railings and lamp standards More images
All Saints School	Mill Mount, York	House	c. 1850	24 June 1983	SE5951150967; 53°57′05″N 1°05′41″W	1257280	All Saints School More images
Assembly of God Pentecostal Church and building attached at rear	Priory Street, York	Chapel	1854	25 June 1982	SE5989351524; 53°57′23″N 1°05′20″W	1256884	Assembly of God Pentecostal Church and building attached at rear More images
York Medical Society	23 Stonegate, York	House	1870	14 June 1954	SE6027352021; 53°57′39″N 1°04′58″W	1256516	York Medical Society More images
Elm Bank Hotel	The Mount, York	House	c. 1870	1 July 1968	SE5925650917; 53°57′03″N 1°05′55″W	1256439	Elm Bank Hotel More images
York railway station	Station Road, York	Railway station	1872–1877	1 July 1968	SE5959751712; 53°57′29″N 1°05′36″W	1256554	York railway station More images
Municipal offices and Council Chamber and Guildhall Annex	Coney Street, York	Office	1889–1891; 1901–1903	24 June 1983	SE6007751910; 53°57′35″N 1°05′09″W	1257939	Municipal offices and Council Chamber and Guildhall Annex More images
Scarcroft County Primary School	Scarcroft Road, York	School	1896	1 July 1968	SE5981651116; 53°57′10″N 1°05′24″W	1256667	Scarcroft County Primary School More images
Wall, gates and gate piers approximately 90 metres south-west of 1 Minster Yard	York	Gate	c. 1900	14 June 1954	SE6036252268; 53°57′47″N 1°04′53″W	1257250	Wall, gates and gate piers approximately 90 metres south-west of 1 Minster Yard More images
Former North Eastern Railway Company offices and area railings attached	Toft Green, York	Office	1904	24 June 1983	SE5988451763; 53°57′31″N 1°05′20″W	1256400	Former North Eastern Railway Company offices and area railings attached More images
Bishopsbarns and garden wall and gates attached at front	27 St George's Place, York	House	1905	24 June 1983	SE5895750665; 53°56′55″N 1°06′11″W	1256793	Bishopsbarns and garden wall and gates attached at front More images
South African War Memorial	Duncombe Place, York	War memorial	1905	1 July 1968	SE6021552119; 53°57′42″N 1°05′01″W	1257874	South African War Memorial More images
North Eastern Railway Company War Memorial	Station Rise, York	War memorial	1922–1924	10 September 1970	SE5982251779; 53°57′31″N 1°05′23″W	1256553	North Eastern Railway Company War Memorial More images
York City War Memorial in the War Memorial Garden	Leeman Road, York	War memorial	1925	10 September 1970	SE5983751919; 53°57′38″N 1°05′28″W	1257512	York City War Memorial in the War Memorial Garden More images
Number 25 including carriage entrance	Tadcaster Road, Dringhouses	Lodge	1927	24 June 1983	SE5880949784; 53°56′27″N 1°06′20″W	1256505	Number 25 including carriage entrance More images

== See also ==
- Grade I listed buildings in the City of York
- Scheduled monuments in the City of York
