= 13 The Shambles =

Listed building in York, England

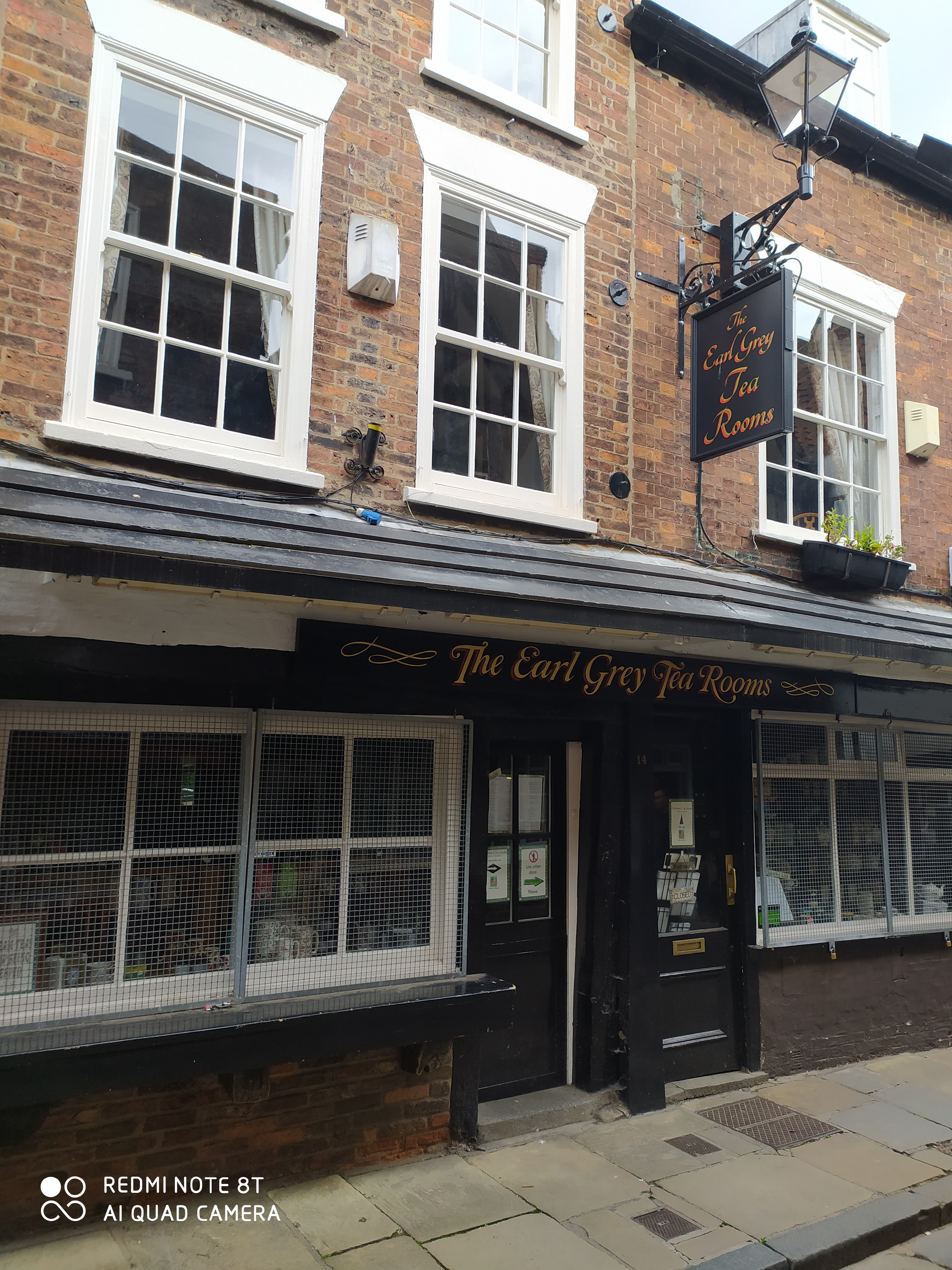
- The building in 2020
- Interactive map of the 13 The Shambles area

General information
- Location: 13 The Shambles, York, England
- Coordinates: 53°57′34″N 1°04′48″W
- Completed: Early 16th century
- Renovated: 18th century (refronted); 19th century (shopfront); 20th century (renovated)

Technical details
- Floor count: 3

Design and construction
- Designations

Listed Building – Grade II*
- Official name: 13, Shambles
- Designated: 14 June 1954
- Reference no.: 1256678

13 The Shambles is a historic building in York, England. A Grade II* listed building, located on The Shambles, the building dates to the early 16th century, but it was refronted in the 18th century and renovated in the 19th and 20th centuries.

The timber supports that ran down to a counter and the canopy of the original open stall are now incorporated into today's façade.

As of 2020, the building is occupied by The Earl Grey Tea Rooms.

== See also ==
- Grade II* listed buildings in the City of York
- Listed buildings in York (within the city walls, northern part)
