= 19 The Shambles =

Listed building in York, England

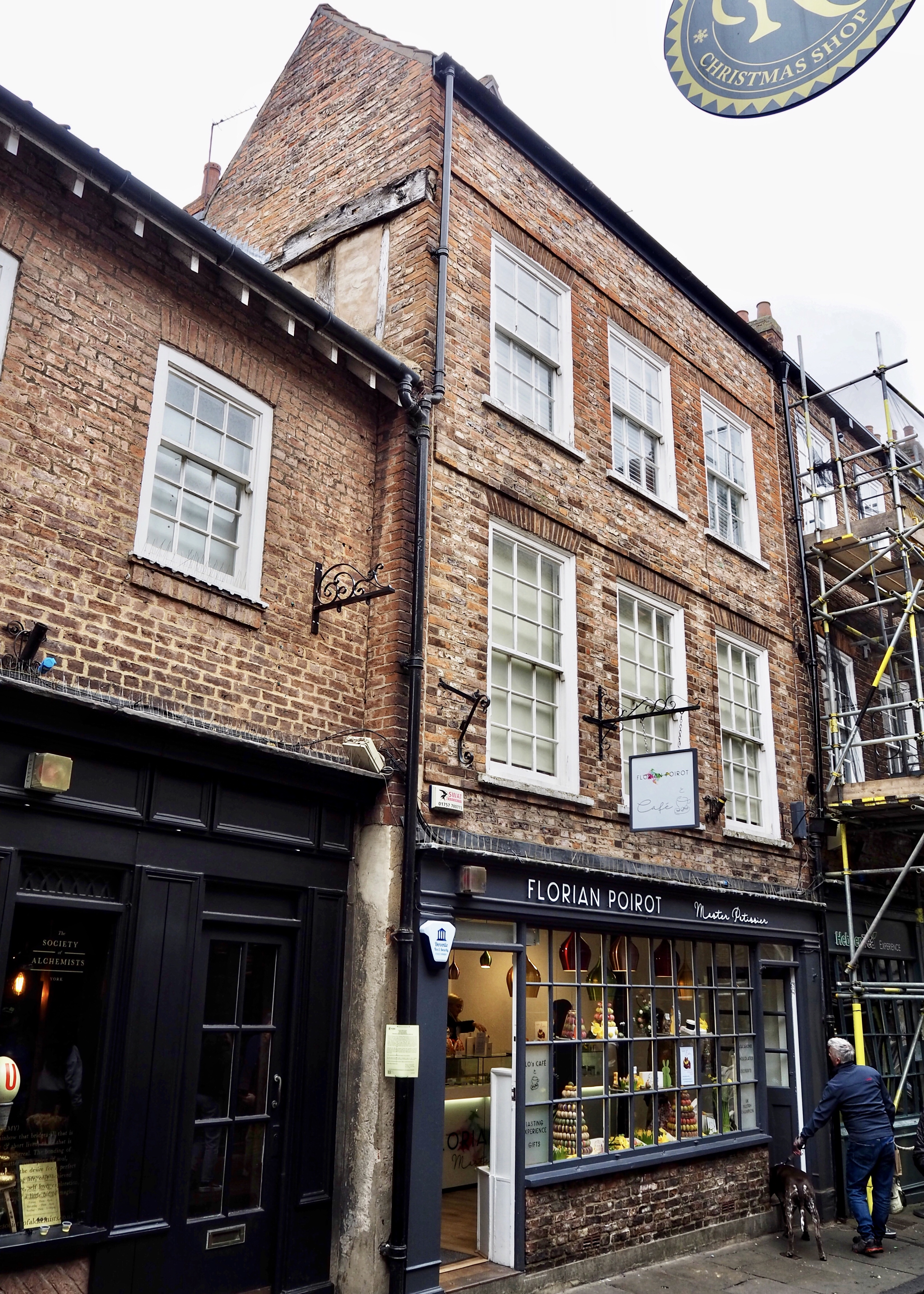
- The building in 2025
- Interactive map of the 19 The Shambles area

General information
- Location: The Shambles, York, England
- Coordinates: 53°57′34″N 1°04′47″W
- Completed: Early 16th century (probable)
- Renovated: Early 18th century (refronted, rear extended); 19th century (altered); 20th century (renovated)

Technical details
- Material: Timber framed, brick
- Floor count: 3

Design and construction
- Designations

Listed Building – Grade II
- Official name: 19, Shambles
- Designated: 14 June 1954
- Reference no.: 1256680

19 The Shambles is a historic building in York, England. A Grade II listed building on The Shambles, it is believed to date from the early 16th century, but it was refronted in the 18th century and renovated in the 19th and 20th centuries.

The storefront is made of red brick in a Flemish bond, with plain brick stringing at the middle and upper floors.

Internally on the ground floor, part of a 17th-century Arabesque frieze survives.

As of 2025, the building is occupied by Florian Poirot Cafe.

== See also ==
- Listed buildings in York (within the city walls, northern part)
