= 45 The Shambles =

Listed building in York, England

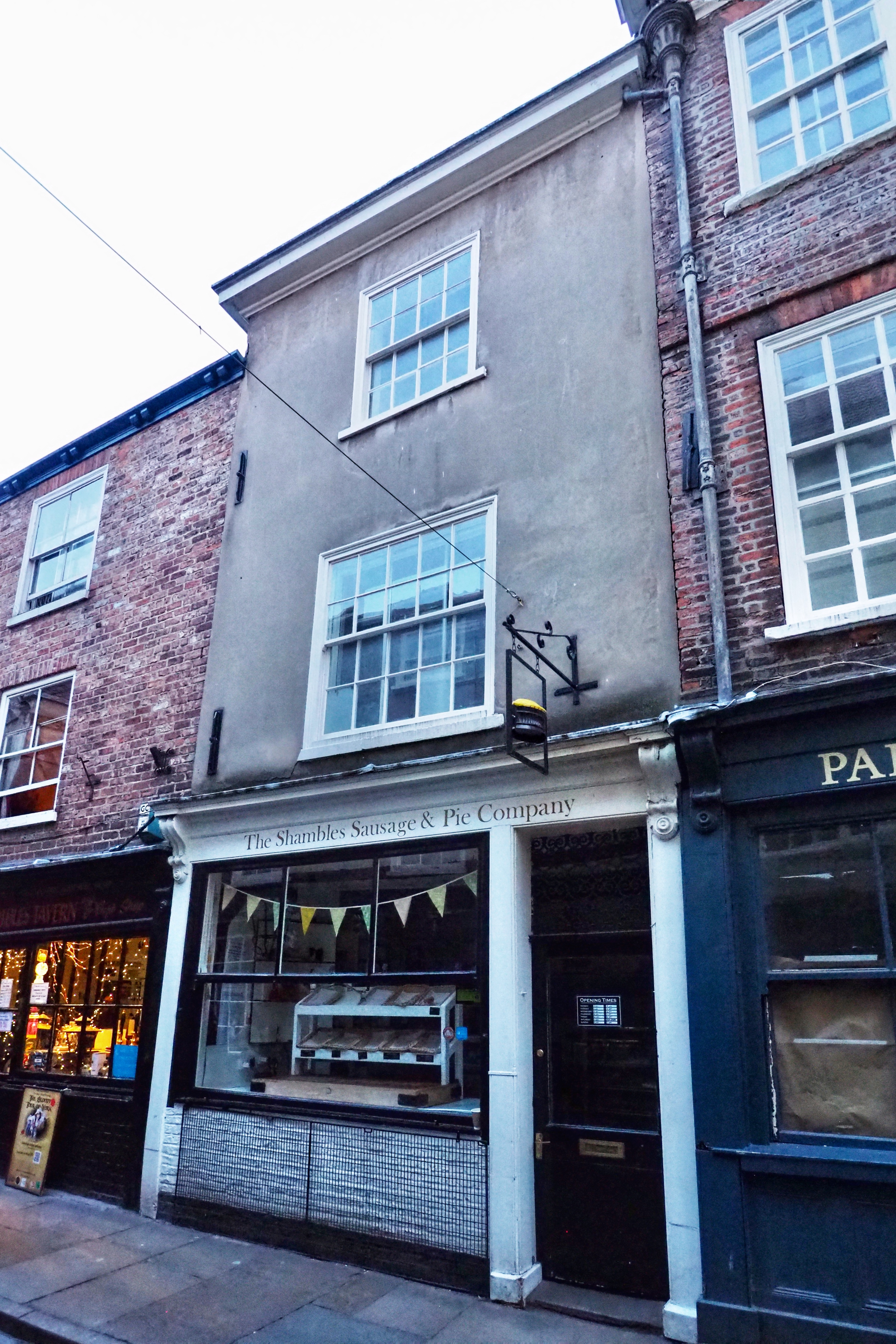
- The building in 2024
- Interactive map of the 45 The Shambles area

General information
- Location: The Shambles, York, England
- Coordinates: 53°57′34″N 1°04′49″W
- Completed: Early 18th century
- Renovated: Early 19th century (altered); Late 19th century (shopfront)

Technical details
- Floor count: 3

Design and construction
- Designations

Listed Building – Grade II
- Official name: 45, Shambles
- Designated: 14 June 1954
- Reference no.: 1256661

45 The Shambles is a historic building on The Shambles in York, England.

A Grade II listed building, it was constructed of brick in the early 18th century. The front was altered in about 1800, and has one window on each of the two upper storeys. The ground floor has a late-19th-century shopfront. The interior has been altered and does not retain original features.

Since 2009, the shop has housed the Shambles Sausage & Pie Company.

== See also ==
- Listed buildings in York (within the city walls, northern part)
