= 6 The Shambles =

Listed building in York, England

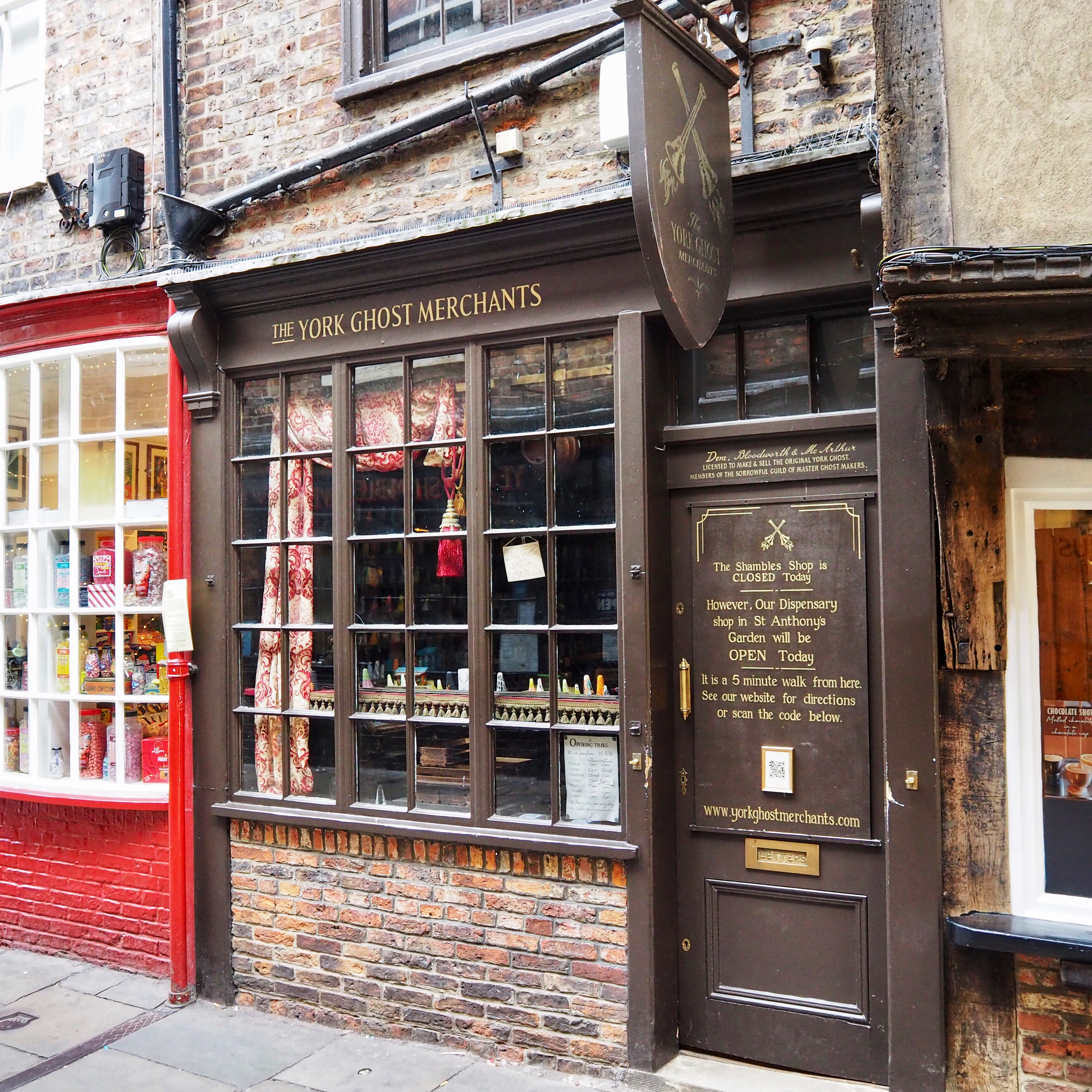
- The shopfront in 2025
- Interactive map of the 6 The Shambles area

General information
- Location: The Shambles, York, England
- Coordinates: 53°57′35″N 1°04′49″W
- Completed: Late 18th century
- Renovated: 20th century (renovated and shopfront)

Technical details
- Floor count: 3

Design and construction
- Designations

Listed Building – Grade II
- Official name: 6, Shambles
- Designated: 14 June 1954
- Reference no.: 1256673

6 The Shambles is a historic building on The Shambles in York, England. A Grade II listed building, part of the structure dates to the late 18th century, with a renovation occurring in the 20th century, including the addition of a shopfront.

According to Historic England, its "grey-brown mottled" bricks are in Flemish bond, while the shopfront and cornice are made of timber. On the second floor is a cast-iron Art Nouveau fireplace.

As of 2025, the building is occupied by The York Ghost Merchants.

== See also ==
- Listed buildings in York (within the city walls, northern part)
