= 46–47 The Shambles =

Listed building in York, England

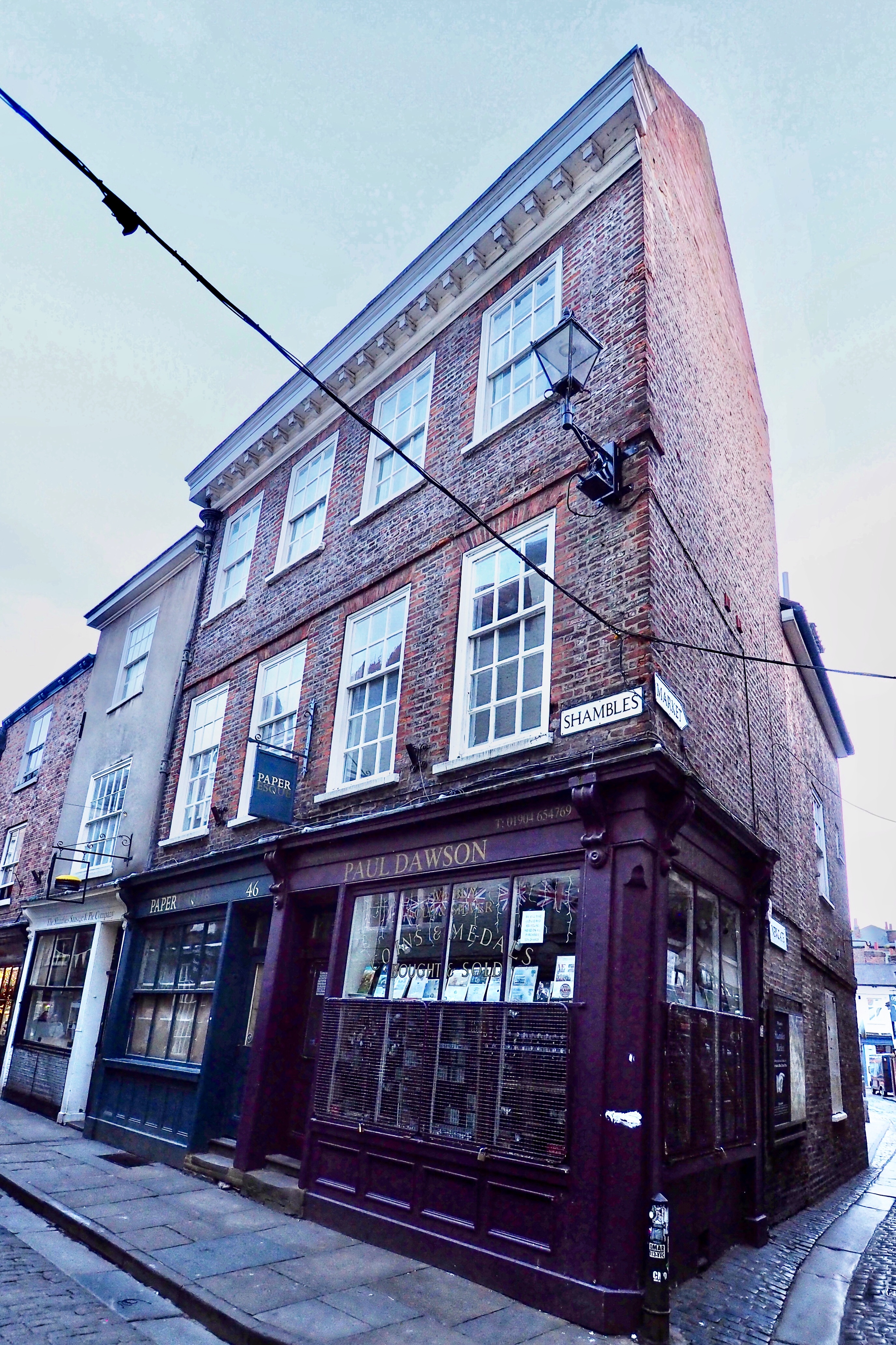
- The building in 2024
- Interactive map of the 46–47 The Shambles area

General information
- Location: The Shambles, York, England
- Coordinates: 53°57′35″N 1°04′49″W
- Completed: Mid-18th century
- Renovated: Late 19th century (shopfronts)

Technical details
- Floor count: 3

Design and construction
- Designations

Listed Building – Grade II
- Official name: 46 and 47, Shambles
- Designated: 14 June 1954
- Reference no.: 1256662

46–47 The Shambles is a historic pair of buildings on The Shambles in York, England. Grade II listed, parts of the structures date to the mid-18th century, with a shopfront added in the late 19th century.

As of 2025, No. 46 is occupied by Gelato! by Ashley Smith and No. 47 is occupied by Paul Dawson Ltd, a coin and medal trader.

== Architecture ==
The front is built in orange‑buff brick with timber shopfronts and a simple cornice, and a pantile roof with a brick chimney. It has three storeys and four windows. A paired shopfront spans the width, with glazed, panelled doors and large sash windows beneath a moulded cornice on grooved brackets; No. 46 has its window set above a panelled base, and No. 47 continues around the right corner. Upper floors have 15‑pane sashes on the first floor and 12‑pane sashes above, all on painted stone sills with flat brick heads. A moulded eaves cornice with a fluted rainwater head sits at the left, and a narrow raised brick band marks the second floor.

== See also ==
- Listed buildings in York (within the city walls, northern part)
