= 21 Colliergate =

Listed building in York, England

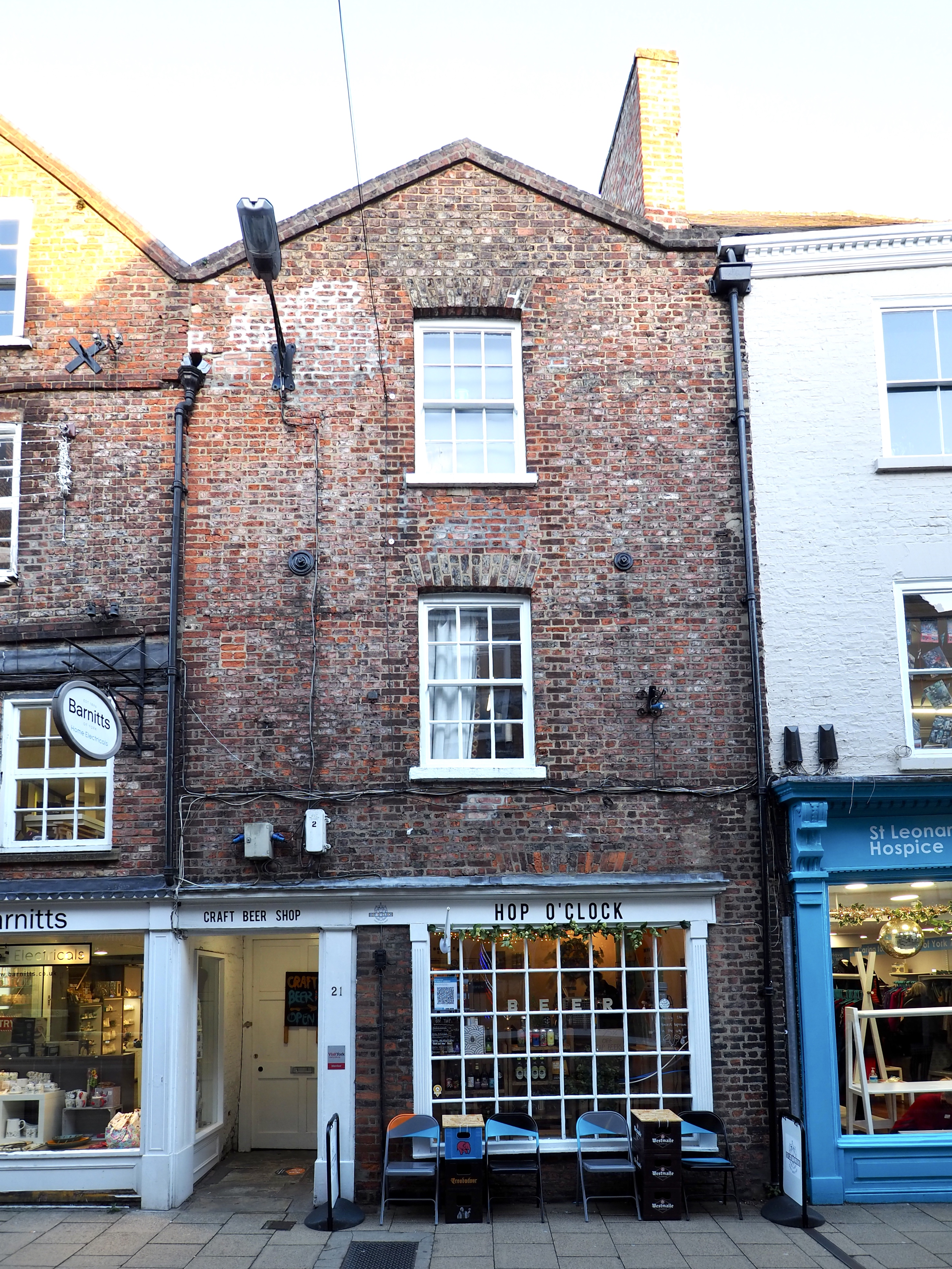
- The building in 2020
- Interactive map of the 21 Colliergate area
- Former names: Margaret Mason's Hospital

General information
- Status: Converted to commercial use
- Type: Almshouse (former); originally a house
- Location: Colliergate, York, England
- Coordinates: 53°57′34″N 1°04′46″W
- Year built: Early 18th century
- Renovated: Mid-19th and 20th century (altered)

Design and construction
- Designations

Listed Building – Grade II
- Official name: 21, Colliergate
- Designated: 1 July 1968
- Reference no.: 1258008

21 Colliergate is a historic building in the city centre of York, England.

The site on Colliergate has been in use for many centuries. Fragments of medieval timber framing are visible in the side walls of the ground floor, and further timber framing from around 1600 survives on the second floor. The house was rebuilt in the early 18th century, and in 1732 it was converted into Margaret Mason's Hospital, an almshouse for six widows. In 1783, the front and rear walls were demolished and rebuilt in brick, and in the mid-19th century the floor heights in the front were raised to match those in the rear. In the 1940s, the almshouse was altered to provide five bedsit rooms, but it had closed by 1958 and was later converted into a shop. The building was Grade II listed in 1968. The original doorframe was destroyed when the shop was burgled in 2023, after which the tenants applied for permission to install a steel gate.

The building has a timber-framed core and external walls of orange-pink brick, with a slate roof. It has three storeys and is a single bay wide, with a gabled front. On the ground floor are two doorways, one to the shop and one to a passageway, and a shop window with small panes below a cornice. The upper floors each have a single sash window. Inside, a staircase installed in the mid-19th century runs the full height of the building.

== See also ==
- Listed buildings in York (within the city walls, northern part)
