= 5 Colliergate =

Listed building in York, England

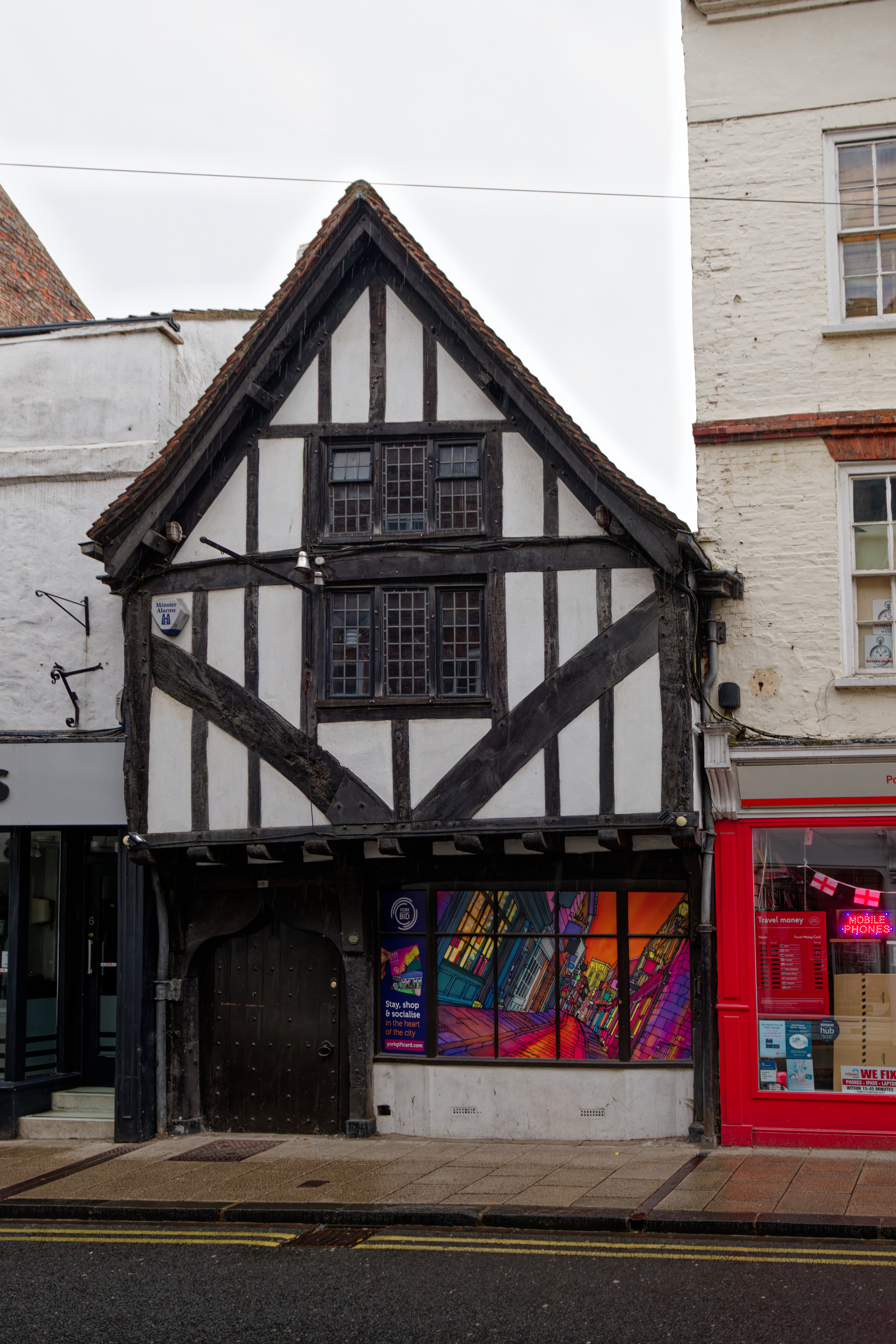
- The building in 2024
- Interactive map of the 5 Colliergate area

General information
- Status: Converted to commercial use
- Type: House (former)
- Location: Colliergate, York, England
- Coordinates: 53°57′35″N 1°04′47″W
- Year built: 16th century (possible)
- Renovated: 18th century (extended) c. 1930 (partly rebuilt and restored)
- Owner: York Conservation Trust

Design and construction
- Designations

Listed Building – Grade II
- Official name: 5, Colliergate
- Designated: 14 June 1954
- Reference no.: 1257059

5 Colliergate is a historic building in the city centre of York, England.

The building is believed to have been constructed in the 16th century as a house, located on Colliergate. It is a timber framed building. In the 18th century, a third bay, in brick, was added at the rear; this may be a replacement for an earlier timber bay. For many years, the building was used for light manufacturing, work including paper box making and artificial floristry, then it became a shop. In about 1930 it was heavily restored, with many of the timbers being replaced, and a distinctive new ogee head being added to the passage doorway. By this time, it was one of the last surviving medieval buildings on the street. In 1957, it was purchased by the York Conservation Trust, which removed render from the front, replaced further timbers, and extended the ground floor shop into the passageway, replacing the former shop entrance and bow window with a larger window. The building has been Grade II listed since 1954.

The building is constructed of timber with plaster infill, and the rear bay of orange-red brick, with both sections having a tiled roof. It has two storeys with an attic, a single bay wide and three bays deep. The front two bays appear to have originally been undivided at ground level, but only the front bay had an upper floor. The doorway has its original posts but a 20th-century head and nail-studded wooden door. The windows on the upper floor have three lights divided by timber mullions and square leaded-light panes.

== See also ==
- Listed buildings in York (within the city walls, northern part)
