= 2 The Shambles =

Listed building in York, England

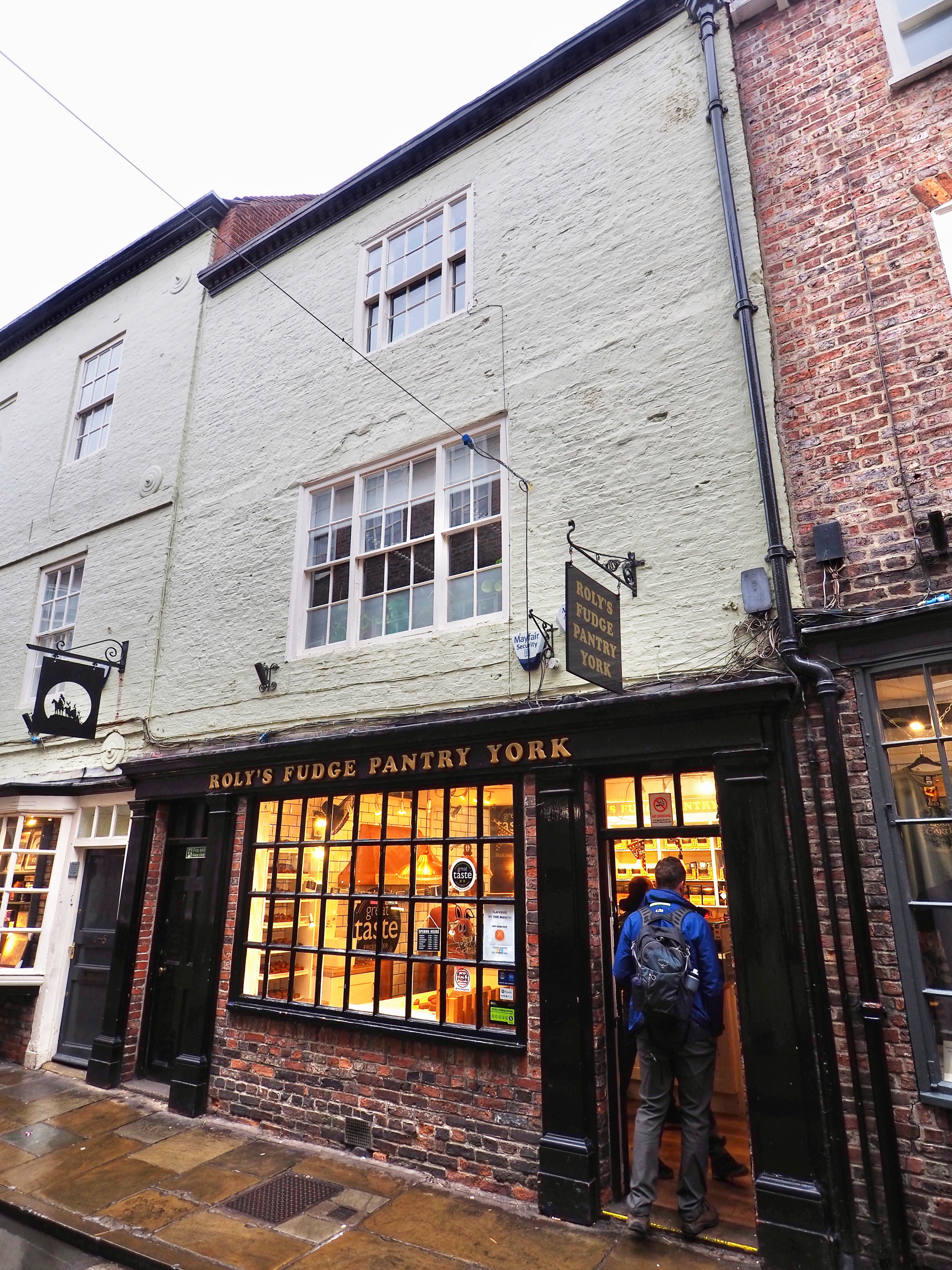
- The building in 2024
- Interactive map of the 2 The Shambles area

General information
- Location: The Shambles, York, England
- Coordinates: 53°57′35″N 1°04′49″W
- Completed: Early 18th century
- Renovated: Early and mid-19th century (altered) c. 1970 (modernised)

Technical details
- Floor count: 3

Design and construction
- Designations

Listed Building – Grade II
- Official name: 2, Shambles
- Designated: 14 June 1954
- Reference no.: 1256671

2 The Shambles is a historic building on The Shambles in York, England. A Grade II listed building, part of the structure dates to the early 18th century, with alterations occurring in the early and mid-19th century, including the addition of a shopfront. The building was modernised around 1970.

Its bricks are in Flemish bond, while the shopfront is made of timber. The windows on the upper floors are in three sections.

As of 2025, the building is occupied by Roly's Fudge Pantry.

== See also ==
- Listed buildings in York (within the city walls, northern part)
