= Listed buildings in York (within the city walls, northern part) =

York is a city in the City of York district, within the ceremonial county of North Yorkshire, England. It contains 65 Grade I, 161 Grade II*, and 1,004 Grade II listed buildings recorded in the National Heritage List for England.

This list is based on information retrieved from Historic England.

Because York has a large number of listed buildings, the subject is divided into geographically defined lists. This list covers all listed buildings inside the city walls, east of the River Ouse, and north of Low Ousegate, High Ousegate and Pavement (which are not included). It also includes York Minster.

== Key ==
Grade	Criteria
I	Buildings that are of exceptional interest
II*	Particularly important buildings of more than special interest
II	Buildings that are of special interest

== Buildings ==
Name	Grade	Location	Type	Completed (Note: The date given is the date used by Historic England as significant for the initial building or that of an important part in the structure's description.)	Date designated	Grid ref. (Note: The grid reference is based on the British national grid reference system, sometimes known as OSGB36, used by the Ordnance Survey.) Geo-coordinates	Entry number (Note: The "List Entry Number" is a unique number assigned to each listed building and scheduled monument by Historic England.)	Image	Wikidata
Column approximately 4 metres north east of number 9	II	Minster Yard	Column	c. 100	24 June 1983	SE6034152116; 53°57′42″N 1°04′55″W	1257260	Column approximately 4 metres north east of number 9 More images	Q26548646
Roman wall approximately 20 metres south east of Monk Bar	I	Aldwark	Wall	c. 200	14 June 1954	SE6062252178; 53°57′44″N 1°04′39″W	1259572	Roman wall approximately 20 metres south east of Monk Bar More images	Q17530664
Wall approximately 2 metres north of number 9	I	St Leonard's Place	Wall	c. 300	24 June 1983	SE6007952174; 53°57′44″N 1°05′09″W	1256762	Wall approximately 2 metres north of number 9 More images	Q17530548
Church of Holy Trinity	I	Goodramgate	Church	12th century	14 June 1954	SE6043552052; 53°57′40″N 1°04′49″W	1257686	Church of Holy Trinity More images	Q17530619
Grays Court and garden gates and piers attached to south east corner	I	1 Minster Yard	House	12th–14th century	14 June 1954	SE6041052301; 53°57′48″N 1°04′51″W	1257248	Grays Court and garden gates and piers attached to south east corner More images	Q5598345
The Norman House	I	Stonegate	House	Late 12th century	14 June 1954	SE6025452078; 53°57′41″N 1°04′59″W	1256494	The Norman House More images	Q17530543
Arcade of former Archbishop's Palace and attached railings and gates	I	Dean's Park	Arcade	Late 12th century (arcade); 1839 (railings and gates)	14 June 1954	SE6026052289; 53°57′47″N 1°04′59″W	1257919	Arcade of former Archbishop's Palace and attached railings and gates More images	Q17530634
Church of St Michael	I	Spurriergate	Church	Late 12th century; 1868 (partly rebuilt)	14 June 1954	SE6029451694; 53°57′28″N 1°04′57″W	1256593	Church of St Michael More images	Q17530545
Old Palace	I	Dean's Park	Chapel	1230s	14 June 1954	SE6030252316; 53°57′48″N 1°04′57″W	1257880	Old Palace More images	Q7084690
Cathedral Church of St Peter, York Minster	I	Minster Yard	Cathedral	c. 1230–1472	14 June 1954	SE6032352180; 53°57′44″N 1°04′55″W	1257222	Cathedral Church of St Peter, York Minster More images	Q252575
St Leonard's Hospital remains	I	Museum Street	Ruins	c. 1240	14 June 1954	SE6005252049; 53°57′40″N 1°05′10″W	1257087	St Leonard's Hospital remains More images	Q17530582
Barley Hall	II	2 Coffee Yard	Hall	13th century (probable)	14 June 1954	SE6029252030; 53°57′39″N 1°04′57″W	1259208	Barley Hall More images	Q4861158
City Wall from Multangular Tower to rear of number 8 St Leonard's Place	I	City Walls	Wall	1250–1270	14 June 1954	SE6002952117; 53°57′42″N 1°05′12″W	1259292	City Wall from Multangular Tower to rear of number 8 St Leonard's Place More images	Q17530647
City Wall from Bootham Bar to Layerthorpe	I	High Petergate	Wall	1250–1270	14 June 1954	SE6028452411; 53°57′51″N 1°04′57″W	1259293	City Wall from Bootham Bar to Layerthorpe More images	Q17530650
Bedern Chapel	II*	Bedern	Chapel	1252	14 June 1954	SE6050952139; 53°57′42″N 1°04′45″W	1259537	Bedern Chapel More images	Q17550088
Lendal Tower	I	Museum Street	Tower	c. 1300	14 June 1954	SE5999151959; 53°57′37″N 1°05′14″W	1257086	Lendal Tower More images	Q17530580
2 College Street	II*		House	Late 13th or early 14th century	14 June 1954	SE6042852204; 53°57′45″N 1°04′50″W	1259189	2 College Street More images	Q17550019
Lady Row	I	60–72 Goodramgate	House	1317	14 June 1954	SE6045752039; 53°57′39″N 1°04′48″W	1257710	Lady Row More images	Q17530622
54, 56, and 58 Stonegate	II*		House	Early 14th century	14 June 1954	SE6028452086; 53°57′41″N 1°04′58″W	1256493	54, 56, and 58 Stonegate More images	Q17549318
12–15 Newgate	II		House	1337	25 March 1950	SE6040851896; 53°57′35″N 1°04′51″W	1257061	12–15 Newgate More images	Q26548477
Bedern Hall	II*	Bedern	Hall	Mid-14th century	24 June 1983	SE6052652108; 53°57′41″N 1°04′44″W	1259538	Bedern Hall More images	Q4879075
30 and 32 Goodramgate, 11 and 12 College Street	II*		House	14th century	14 June 1954	SE6048652165; 53°57′43″N 1°04′47″W	1257731	30 and 32 Goodramgate, 11 and 12 College Street More images	Q17549892
60 Stonegate, 33, 33A and 35 High Petergate	II*		House	14th century	14 June 1954	SE6028852095; 53°57′41″N 1°04′57″W	1257580	60 Stonegate, 33, 33A and 35 High Petergate More images	Q17549858
1 Shambles	II		House	14th century	14 June 1954	SE6044851916; 53°57′35″N 1°04′49″W	1256670	1 Shambles More images	Q26548140
6 Newgate	II		House	14th century; c. 1880 (rebuilt)	14 June 1954	SE6042151906; 53°57′35″N 1°04′50″W	1257059	6 Newgate More images	Q26548475
1, 2, 2A, and 3 Minster Court	II*		House	14th–16th century	14 June 1954	SE6037052300; 53°57′48″N 1°04′53″W	1257243	1, 2, 2A, and 3 Minster Court More images	Q17549645
Church of St Helen	II*	St Helen's Square	Church	14th–16th century; 1857 (rebuilt)	14 June 1954	SE6020551970; 53°57′37″N 1°05′02″W	1256800	Church of St Helen More images	Q17549551
2 Jubbergate	II*		House	Late 14th century	14 June 1954	SE6041251873; 53°57′34″N 1°04′51″W	1257555	2 Jubbergate More images	Q108365118
41 and 43 Low Petergate	II*		House	Late 14th century	14 June 1954	SE6031152081; 53°57′41″N 1°04′56″W	1257454	41 and 43 Low Petergate More images	Q17549822
67 Low Petergate	II		House	Late 14th century	14 June 1954	SE6035652044; 53°57′39″N 1°04′54″W	1257414	67 Low Petergate More images	Q26548771
Shrine of St Margaret Clitherow	II*	35 Shambles	House	Late 14th century	14 June 1954	SE6045551857; 53°57′33″N 1°04′48″W	1256688	Shrine of St Margaret Clitherow More images	Q17549464
Merchant Taylors' Hall	I	Aldwark	Hall	c. 1400	14 June 1954	SE6064452153; 53°57′43″N 1°04′38″W	1259571	Merchant Taylors' Hall More images	Q15253093
19 Grape Lane	II		House	Early 15th century	14 June 1954	SE6031052010; 53°57′38″N 1°04′56″W	1257666	19 Grape Lane More images	Q26549001
79 Low Petergate	II*		House	Early 15th century	14 June 1954	SE6036952015; 53°57′39″N 1°04′53″W	1257424	79 Low Petergate More images	Q17549803
13 Stonegate	II*		House	Early 15th century	14 June 1954	SE6022552010; 53°57′38″N 1°05′01″W	1256509	13 Stonegate More images	Q17549328
7 and 8 Shambles	II*		House	Early 15th century (No. 8); late 15th century (No. 7)	14 June 1954	SE6045651895; 53°57′35″N 1°04′48″W	1256674	7 and 8 Shambles More images	Q17549437
Church of St Martin le Grand	II*	Coney Street	Church	Early 15th century; 1853–54 (partly rebuilt)	14 June 1954	SE6016251856; 53°57′33″N 1°05′05″W	1257963	Church of St Martin le Grand More images	Q17549993
31, 32 and 33 Shambles	II		House	Early 15th century; c. 1960 (partly rebuilt)	14 June 1954	SE6045851846; 53°57′33″N 1°04′48″W	1256686	31, 32 and 33 Shambles More images	Q26548150
Guildhall and chamber range, Atkinson block, Common Hall Lane and boundary wall containing entrance to lane	I	Coney Street (west off)	Hall	1449–1459	14 June 1954	SE6010151894; 53°57′35″N 1°05′08″W	1257929	Guildhall and chamber range, Atkinson block, Common Hall Lane and boundary wall containing entrance to lane More images	Q1553813
1 Chapter House Street	II		House	15th century or earlier	14 June 1954	SE6041052227; 53°57′45″N 1°04′51″W	1259317	1 Chapter House Street More images	Q26550447
1 Little Shambles	II		House	15th century	14 June 1954	SE6044551881; 53°57′34″N 1°04′49″W	1257477	1 Little Shambles More images	Q26548828
9 Shambles	II*		House	15th century	14 June 1954	SE6045951890; 53°57′34″N 1°04′48″W	1256675	9 Shambles More images	Q57560776
10 and 11 Shambles	II*		House	15th century	14 June 1954	SE6046351882; 53°57′34″N 1°04′48″W	1256676	10 and 11 Shambles More images	Q17549445
76 Low Petergate	II		House	15th century	14 June 1954	SE6042651990; 53°57′38″N 1°04′50″W	1257422	76 Low Petergate More images	Q26548778
1 Minster Gates, 38 High Petergate	II*		House	15th century	14 June 1954	SE6029152110; 53°57′42″N 1°04′57″W	1257244	1 Minster Gates, 38 High Petergate More images	Q17549648
Church of St Andrew, Evangelical Church	II*	St Andrewgate	Church	15th century	14 June 1954	SE6056752034; 53°57′39″N 1°04′42″W	1256792	Church of St Andrew, Evangelical Church More images	Q15129917
Mulberry Hall	II*	17 and 19 Stonegate	House	15th century	14 June 1954	SE6024652027; 53°57′39″N 1°05′00″W	1256512	Mulberry Hall More images	Q17564714
21 and 25 Stonegate	II*		House	15th century	14 June 1954	SE6025852038; 53°57′39″N 1°04′59″W	1256514	21 and 25 Stonegate More images	Q17549345
27 Stonegate	II		House	15th century	14 June 1954	SE6026052041; 53°57′39″N 1°04′59″W	1256518	27 Stonegate More images	Q26548014
At the Sign of the Bible	II*	35 Stonegate	House	15th century	1 July 1968	SE6027552054; 53°57′40″N 1°04′58″W	1256524	At the Sign of the Bible More images	Q17549368
81 Low Petergate	II*		House	15th century; 18th century (partly rebuilt)	14 June 1954	SE6038152010; 53°57′38″N 1°04′52″W	1257389	81 Low Petergate More images	Q17549774
The Royal Oak public house	II	18 Goodramgate	Public house	15th century (probable)	1 July 1968	SE6051852190; 53°57′44″N 1°04′45″W	1257763	The Royal Oak public house More images	Q26549089
31 and 33 Goodramgate	II		House	15th century (probable)	19 August 1971	SE6048752140; 53°57′43″N 1°04′46″W	1257732	31 and 33 Goodramgate More images	Q26549062
38 and 40 Goodramgate	II		House	15th century (probable)	19 August 1971	SE6046452116; 53°57′42″N 1°04′48″W	1257736	38 and 40 Goodramgate More images	Q26549065
43 Stonegate	II*		House	15th century (probable)	14 June 1954	SE6029552074; 53°57′40″N 1°04′57″W	1256487	43 Stonegate More images	Q17549282
44 and 46 Stonegate	II*		House	15th century	14 June 1954	SE6025652067; 53°57′40″N 1°04′59″W	1256488	44 and 46 Stonegate More images	Q26263474
33 Swinegate	II		House	15th century (probable)	24 June 1983	SE6035451949; 53°57′36″N 1°04′54″W	1256495	33 Swinegate More images	Q26547997
12–18 High Petergate	II		House	15th century (probable); c. 1905 (rebuilt)	14 June 1954	SE6016552209; 53°57′45″N 1°05′04″W	1257600	12–18 High Petergate More images	Q26548939
31 and 31A High Petergate	II		House	15th–17th century	14 June 1954	SE6026352091; 53°57′41″N 1°04′59″W	1257578	31 and 31A High Petergate More images	Q26548919
St William's College	I	College Street	College	c. 1465	14 June 1954	SE6044652194; 53°57′44″N 1°04′49″W	1258028	St William's College More images	Q17530637
St Sampson's Church	II	Church Street	Church	Late 15th century; 1845–1848 (rebuilt)	14 June 1954	SE6038651911; 53°57′35″N 1°04′52″W	1259289	St Sampson's Church More images	Q26550425
12 and 12A Shambles	II*		House	Late 15th century	14 June 1954	SE6046451878; 53°57′34″N 1°04′48″W	1256677	12 and 12A Shambles More images	Q17549450
37 and 38 Shambles	II*		House	Late 15th century; c. 1950 (partly rebuilt)	14 June 1954	SE6045151862; 53°57′34″N 1°04′49″W	1256643	37 and 38 Shambles More images	Q17549403
39 Shambles	II*		House	Late 15th century	14 June 1954	SE6044851869; 53°57′34″N 1°04′49″W	1256644	39 Shambles More images	Q17549408
41 and 42 Shambles	II*		Shop	Late 15th century	14 June 1954	SE6044851878; 53°57′34″N 1°04′49″W	1256657	41 and 42 Shambles More images	Q17549413
44 Shambles	II*		House	Late 15th century	1 July 1968	SE6043851895; 53°57′35″N 1°04′49″W	1256659	44 Shambles More images	Q17549417
52 Stonegate	II*		House	Late 15th century	14 June 1954	SE6027452080; 53°57′41″N 1°04′58″W	1256492	52 Stonegate More images	Q17549312
16–22 Coney Street	II*		House	c. 1500	14 June 1954	SE6020451847; 53°57′33″N 1°05′02″W	1257978	16–22 Coney Street More images	Q17549999
The Golden Slipper public house	II	20 Goodramgate	Public house	c. 1500	14 June 1954	SE6051452183; 53°57′44″N 1°04′45″W	1257765	The Golden Slipper public house More images	Q109284705
41, 43 and 45 Goodramgate	I		Shop	c. 1500	14 June 1954	SE6048252117; 53°57′42″N 1°04′47″W	1257738	41, 43 and 45 Goodramgate More images	Q17530625
The Snickleway Inn and attached buildings at rear	II*	47 Goodramgate	Public house	c. 1500	14 June 1954	SE6048052102; 53°57′41″N 1°04′47″W	1257742	The Snickleway Inn and attached buildings at rear More images	Q17549897
The Wealden Hall	I	49 and 51 Goodramgate	Hall	c. 1500	14 June 1954	SE6047952092; 53°57′41″N 1°04′47″W	1257745	The Wealden Hall More images	Q17530628
56, 58 and 60 Low Petergate	II*		House	c. 1500	14 June 1954	SE6036552063; 53°57′40″N 1°04′53″W	1257437	56, 58 and 60 Low Petergate More images	Q17549820
13 Shambles	II*		House	Early 16th century	14 June 1954	SE6046651874; 53°57′34″N 1°04′48″W	1256678	13 Shambles More images	Q17549455
19 Shambles	II		House	Early 16th century (probable)	14 June 1954	SE6047751846; 53°57′33″N 1°04′47″W	1256680	19 Shambles More images	Q26548144
7 St Sampson's Square	II*		House	Early 16th century (probable)	19 August 1971	SE6032251926; 53°57′36″N 1°04′56″W	1256731	7 St Sampson's Square More images	Q17549508
Church of St Michael le Belfrey	I	High Petergate	Church	1525–1537	14 June 1954	SE6027952128; 53°57′42″N 1°04′58″W	1257228	Church of St Michael le Belfrey More images	Q7594874
1, 3 and 5 and wall attached to rear of number 1	II	Blake Street	Shop	16th century	14 June 1954	SE6015952055; 53°57′40″N 1°05′05″W	1259514	1, 3 and 5 and wall attached to rear of number 1 More images	Q26550622
Ye Olde Starre Inne	II	40 Stonegate	Public house	16th century	14 June 1954	SE6022352073; 53°57′40″N 1°05′01″W	1256484	Ye Olde Starre Inne More images	Q26547994
5 Colliergate	II		House	16th century (possible)	14 June 1954	SE6047551904; 53°57′35″N 1°04′47″W	1258037	5 Colliergate More images	Q26549331
11 Colliergate	II		House	16th century or earlier	24 June 1983	SE6048851876; 53°57′34″N 1°04′47″W	1259168	11 Colliergate More images	Q26550311
17 Goodramgate	II		House	16th century (possible)	14 June 1954	SE6052552169; 53°57′43″N 1°04′44″W	1257761	17 Goodramgate More images	Q26549087
25 Goodramgate	II		House	16th century; late 17th century (partly rebuilt)	14 June 1954	SE6050652155; 53°57′43″N 1°04′45″W	1257729	25 Goodramgate More images	Q26549060
5 Chapter House Street, 16, 18 and 20 Ogleforth	II		House	16th century; 18th century (rebuilt)	14 June 1954	SE6045452255; 53°57′46″N 1°04′48″W	1257051	5 Chapter House Street, 16, 18 and 20 Ogleforth More images	Q26548468
5 and 6 King's Court	II		House	16th and mid-18th century; 1951 (rebuilt)	14 June 1954	SE6043251923; 53°57′36″N 1°04′50″W	1257518	5 and 6 King's Court More images	Q26548865
27 Colliergate	II		House	Late 16th century	1 July 1968	SE6048651934; 53°57′36″N 1°04′47″W	1258002	27 Colliergate More images	Q26549298
73, 75 and 77 Low Petergate	II*		House	Late 16th century	14 June 1954	SE6037052028; 53°57′39″N 1°04′53″W	1257419	73, 75 and 77 Low Petergate More images	Q17549795
York Medical Society	II*	23 Stonegate	House	Late 16th century	14 June 1954	SE6027352021; 53°57′39″N 1°04′58″W	1256516	York Medical Society More images	Q17549350
6 King's Square	II		House	Late 16th century; mid-18th century (rebuilt)	24 June 1983	SE6043451951; 53°57′36″N 1°04′50″W	1257521	6 King's Square More images	Q26548868
24 Coney Street	II		House	c. 1600	1 July 1968	SE6021451841; 53°57′33″N 1°05′02″W	1257981	24 Coney Street More images	Q26549277
32 Coney Street	II		House	c. 1600	24 June 1983	SE6022551826; 53°57′32″N 1°05′01″W	1257984	32 Coney Street More images	Q26549280
6 Patrick Pool	II*		Warehouse	c. 1600	25 March 1950	SE6040851906; 53°57′35″N 1°04′51″W	1256976	6 Patrick Pool More images	Q113212255
48 and 50 Stonegate	II*		House	c. 1600	14 June 1954	SE6026852073; 53°57′40″N 1°04′59″W	1256490	48 and 50 Stonegate More images	Q17549301
Jackson House	II	53 Low Petergate	Printing works	c. 1600; late 19th century (partly rebuilt)	19 August 1971	SE6032952042; 53°57′39″N 1°04′55″W	1257663	Jackson House More images	Q26548998
83 Low Petergate	II		House	c. 1600; late 19th century (partly rebuilt)	14 June 1954	SE6038452007; 53°57′38″N 1°04′52″W	1257390	83 Low Petergate More images	Q26548750
4 King's Court	II		House	c. 1600; 1963 (partly rebuilt)	24 June 1983	SE6043551927; 53°57′36″N 1°04′49″W	1257517	4 King's Court More images	Q26548864
24 Goodramgate	II		House	Early 17th century	24 June 1983	SE6050552175; 53°57′44″N 1°04′45″W	1257728	24 Goodramgate More images	Q26549059
The Old White Swan public house	II	76, 78 and 80 Goodramgate	Public house	Early 17th century	19 August 1971	SE6044752010; 53°57′38″N 1°04′49″W	1257711	The Old White Swan public house More images	Q26549042
Cottage at rear of number 11, number 9 and attached outbuildings	II*	High Petergate	House	Early 17th century	14 June 1954	SE6015252198; 53°57′45″N 1°05′05″W	1257621	Cottage at rear of number 11, number 9 and attached outbuildings More images	Q17549881
55 Low Petergate	II*		House	Early 17th century	14 June 1954	SE6033352066; 53°57′40″N 1°04′55″W	1257435	55 Low Petergate More images	Q17549815
57 Low Petergate, 1 Grape Lane	II		House	Early 17th century; late 19th century (partly rebuilt)	14 June 1954	SE6033652057; 53°57′40″N 1°04′55″W	1257408	57 Low Petergate, 1 Grape Lane	Q26548767
71 Low Petergate	II		House	Early 17th century	14 June 1954	SE6036452037; 53°57′39″N 1°04′53″W	1257416	71 Low Petergate More images	Q26548773
78 Low Petergate, 82 Goodramgate	II		House	Early 17th century (No. 78); late 18th century (No. 82)	14 June 1954	SE6043451987; 53°57′38″N 1°04′50″W	1257423	78 Low Petergate, 82 Goodramgate More images	Q26548779
Treasurer's House and attached garden walls, gate and gate piers	I	2 Minster Yard	House	Early 17th century	14 June 1954	SE6040752268; 53°57′47″N 1°04′51″W	1257251	Treasurer's House and attached garden walls, gate and gate piers More images	Q7836749
4 and 4A Stonegate	II*		House	Early 17th century	24 June 1983	SE6018951997; 53°57′38″N 1°05′03″W	1256568	4 and 4A Stonegate More images	Q17549390
6 Stonegate	II		House	Early 17th century	14 June 1954	SE6019351999; 53°57′38″N 1°05′03″W	1256533	6 Stonegate More images	Q26548025
The Punch Bowl public house	II	7 Stonegate	Public house	Early 17th century; 1930 (rebuilt)	14 June 1954	SE6021651996; 53°57′38″N 1°05′01″W	1256535	The Punch Bowl public house More images	Q26548027
8 Stonegate	II*		House	Early 17th century	14 June 1954	SE6019652002; 53°57′38″N 1°05′03″W	1256536	8 Stonegate More images	Q17549375
10 and 10A Stonegate	II		House	Early 17th century (probable)	1 July 1968	SE6019852007; 53°57′38″N 1°05′02″W	1256539	10 and 10A Stonegate More images	Q26548029
12 and 14 Stonegate	II		House	Early 17th century	1 July 1968	SE6020352011; 53°57′38″N 1°05′02″W	1256541	12 and 14 Stonegate More images	Q26548031
16 Stonegate	II		House	Early 17th century	14 June 1954	SE6020852014; 53°57′39″N 1°05′02″W	1256511	16 Stonegate More images	Q26548010
22 and 24 Stonegate	II		Shop	Early 17th century	1 July 1968	SE6021852027; 53°57′39″N 1°05′01″W	1256515	22 and 24 Stonegate More images	Q26548012
33 Stonegate	II*		House	Early 17th century	14 June 1954	SE6027052051; 53°57′40″N 1°04′58″W	1256522	33 Stonegate More images	Q17549362
49 Stonegate	II*		House	Early 17th century	14 June 1954	SE6030352084; 53°57′41″N 1°04′57″W	1256491	49 Stonegate More images	Q17549308
5 St Sampson's Square	II		Inn	Early 17th (probable) and early 18th century	19 August 1971	SE6031451915; 53°57′35″N 1°04′56″W	1256729	5 St Sampson's Square More images	Q26548184
7 High Petergate	II		House	17th century	14 June 1954	SE6014652202; 53°57′45″N 1°05′05″W	1257618	7 High Petergate More images	Q26548954
The Dutch House	II*	2 Ogleforth	House	c. 1650; 1955 (rebuilt)	14 June 1954	SE6050952210; 53°57′45″N 1°04′45″W	1257039	The Dutch House More images	Q17549601
42 Stonegate	II		House	17th century	14 June 1954	SE6025452062; 53°57′40″N 1°04′59″W	1256486	42 Stonegate More images	Q26547996
3 Chapter House Street	II		House	Late 17th century	14 June 1954	SE6041552231; 53°57′46″N 1°04′50″W	1259318	3 Chapter House Street More images	Q26550448
1 Coffee Yard	II		House	Late 17th century	1 July 1968	SE6027552034; 53°57′39″N 1°04′58″W	1259207	1 Coffee Yard More images	Q26550348
22 Goodramgate, buildings attached at rear and 8 Ogleforth	II		House	Late 17th century	24 June 1983	SE6048952203; 53°57′45″N 1°04′46″W	1257725	22 Goodramgate, buildings attached at rear and 8 Ogleforth More images	Q26549056
53 Goodramgate	II		House	Late 17th century; c. 1900 (partly rebuilt)	14 June 1954	SE6047952085; 53°57′41″N 1°04′47″W	1257704	53 Goodramgate More images	Q26549036
Christian Science Reading Room	II	8 High Petergate	Reading room	Late 17th century; early 19th century (partly rebuilt)	1 July 1968	SE6014752225; 53°57′45″N 1°05′05″W	1257620	Christian Science Reading Room More images	Q26548956
17, 17A and 19 High Petergate	II		House	Late 17th century	19 August 1971	SE6017952173; 53°57′44″N 1°05′03″W	1257603	17, 17A and 19 High Petergate More images	Q26548942
2 Patrick Pool	II		House	Late 17th century	25 March 1950	SE6040551925; 53°57′36″N 1°04′51″W	1256975	2 Patrick Pool More images	Q26548395
31 Stonegate	II*		House	Late 17th century	14 June 1954	SE6026752045; 53°57′40″N 1°04′59″W	1256520	31 Stonegate More images	Q17549356
Wall, gate and gate piers, approximately 7 metres north east of numbers 40–42 (not included)	II	Aldwark	Wall	c. 1693	19 August 1971	SE6064552062; 53°57′40″N 1°04′38″W	1259574	Wall, gate and gate piers, approximately 7 metres north east of numbers 40–42 (not included) More images	Q26550673
Thomas Gents Coffee House	II	3 Coffee Yard	House	c. 1700	19 August 1971	SE6028252041; 53°57′39″N 1°04′58″W	1259209	Thomas Gents Coffee House More images	Q26550349
22 Colliergate	II		House	c. 1700	1 July 1968	SE6049951894; 53°57′35″N 1°04′46″W	1258011	22 Colliergate More images	Q26549307
19 Goodramgate	II		House	c. 1700	19 August 1971	SE6052152165; 53°57′43″N 1°04′45″W	1257764	19 Goodramgate More images	Q26549090
48 Goodramgate	II		House	c. 1700	19 March 1979	SE6046152090; 53°57′41″N 1°04′48″W	1257743	48 Goodramgate More images	Q26549070
59 and 61 Goodramgate	II		House	c. 1700	14 June 1954	SE6047652047; 53°57′40″N 1°04′47″W	1257709	59 and 61 Goodramgate More images	Q26549041
5 and 5A High Petergate	II*		House	c. 1700	14 June 1954	SE6014252208; 53°57′45″N 1°05′05″W	1257617	5 and 5A High Petergate More images	Q17549877
89 Low Petergate	II		House	c. 1700	19 August 1971	SE6038551987; 53°57′38″N 1°04′52″W	1257393	89 Low Petergate More images	Q26548753
35A Stonegate	II		House	c. 1700	14 June 1954	SE6027952060; 53°57′40″N 1°04′58″W	1256525	35A Stonegate More images	Q26548018
Cromwell House	II*	13 Ogleforth	House	c. 1700; c. 1974 (partly rebuilt)	14 June 1954	SE6049252239; 53°57′46″N 1°04′46″W	1257048	Cromwell House More images	Q17549605
Youngs Hotel (number 25)	II*	25, 27 and 29 High Petergate	House	1700–1707	14 June 1954	SE6025952112; 53°57′42″N 1°04′59″W	1257610	Youngs Hotel (number 25) More images	Q17549871
The Red House and railings attached at front	II*	Duncombe Place	House	c. 1714	14 June 1954	SE6012552107; 53°57′42″N 1°05′06″W	1257875	The Red House and railings attached at front More images	Q108336798
Judges' Lodging	I	9 Lendal	House	c. 1715	14 June 1954	SE6011552002; 53°57′38″N 1°05′07″W	1257487	Judges' Lodging More images	Q6302730
Oliver Sheldon House	II*	17 and 19 Aldwark	House	c. 1720	14 June 1954	SE6062452110; 53°57′42″N 1°04′39″W	1259568	Oliver Sheldon House More images	Q17550093
Old Rectory House and attached wall and garage	II*	8 Chapter House Street	House	Early 18th century	14 June 1954	SE6044952278; 53°57′47″N 1°04′48″W	1259280	Old Rectory House and attached wall and garage More images	Q17550033
3, 4 and 4A Colliergate	II		House	Early 18th century	14 June 1954	SE6047051914; 53°57′35″N 1°04′48″W	1258036	3, 4 and 4A Colliergate More images	Q26549330
6 and 7 Colliergate	II		House	Early 18th century	19 August 1971	SE6048051900; 53°57′35″N 1°04′47″W	1259164	6 and 7 Colliergate More images	Q26550307
13 and 14 Colliergate	II		House	Early 18th century	14 June 1954	SE6050051864; 53°57′34″N 1°04′46″W	1259170	13 and 14 Colliergate More images	Q26550313
20 Colliergate	II		House	Early 18th century	1 July 1968	SE6050651885; 53°57′34″N 1°04′46″W	1258007	20 Colliergate More images	Q26549303
21 Colliergate	II		House	Early 18th century	1 July 1968	SE6050451889; 53°57′34″N 1°04′46″W	1258008	21 Colliergate More images	Q26549304
23 Colliergate	II		House	Early 18th century	1 July 1968	SE6049851898; 53°57′35″N 1°04′46″W	1258012	23 Colliergate More images	Q26549308
24 Colliergate	II		House	Early 18th century	14 June 1954	SE6049451923; 53°57′36″N 1°04′46″W	1258013	24 Colliergate More images	Q26549309
Judges Court and attached front steps and railings	II*	Coney Street	House	Early 18th century	19 August 1971	SE6023451843; 53°57′33″N 1°05′01″W	1257937	Judges Court and attached front steps and railings More images	Q17549968
Numbers 3, 5 and 7 and attached garden wall	II	Coney Street	House	Early 18th century	14 June 1954	SE6014851886; 53°57′34″N 1°05′05″W	1257972	Numbers 3, 5 and 7 and attached garden wall More images	Q26549269
33 Coney Street	II		Shop	Early 18th century	24 June 1983	SE6021551770; 53°57′31″N 1°05′02″W	1257985	33 Coney Street More images	Q26549281
39 Coney Street	II		House	Early and late 18th century	24 June 1983	SE6022651753; 53°57′30″N 1°05′01″W	1257952	39 Coney Street More images	Q26549252
16 Goodramgate	II		House	Early 18th century; late 18th century (partly rebuilt)	14 June 1954	SE6052452197; 53°57′44″N 1°04′44″W	1257760	16 Goodramgate More images	Q26549086
54 Goodramgate	II		House	Early 18th century	19 August 1971	SE6045852076; 53°57′40″N 1°04′48″W	1257705	54 Goodramgate More images	Q26549037
55 and 57A Goodramgate	II		House	Early 18th century	14 June 1954	SE6047852078; 53°57′41″N 1°04′47″W	1257706	55 and 57A Goodramgate More images	Q26549038
3 High Petergate	II		House	Early 18th century	1 July 1968	SE6013752214; 53°57′45″N 1°05′06″W	1257614	3 High Petergate More images	Q26548951
Petergate House	II*	11 High Petergate	House	Early 18th century	14 June 1954	SE6016252193; 53°57′44″N 1°05′04″W	1257599	Petergate House More images	Q108427367
21 High Petergate	II		House	Early 18th century	14 June 1954	SE6018652170; 53°57′44″N 1°05′03″W	1257606	21 High Petergate More images	Q26548945
Numbers 10, 12 and 14 and carriage gates attached to number 14	II*	Lendal	House	Early 18th century	14 June 1954	SE6008951967; 53°57′37″N 1°05′08″W	1257491	Numbers 10, 12 and 14 and carriage gates attached to number 14 More images	Q17549829
Freshney's Hotel	II	54 Low Petergate	House	Early 18th century and c. 1785	14 June 1954	SE6035552076; 53°57′41″N 1°04′54″W	1257434	Freshney's Hotel More images	Q26548788
95 Low Petergate	II		House	Early 18th century	14 June 1954	SE6039251973; 53°57′37″N 1°04′52″W	1257396	95 Low Petergate More images	Q26548755
97 Low Petergate	II		House	Early 18th century	14 June 1954	SE6041351977; 53°57′37″N 1°04′51″W	1257397	97 Low Petergate More images	Q26548756
21 Market Street	II		House	Early 18th century	24 June 1983	SE6034051795; 53°57′31″N 1°04′55″W	1257371	21 Market Street More images	Q26548734
Number 4 and attached garden wall, gate and railings at front and back	II*	Minster Yard	House	Early 18th century	14 June 1954	SE6041152218; 53°57′45″N 1°04′51″W	1257254	Number 4 and attached garden wall, gate and railings at front and back More images	Q17549656
6 Minster Yard	II*		House	Early 18th century	14 June 1954	SE6041852161; 53°57′43″N 1°04′50″W	1257256	6 Minster Yard More images	Q17549666
11 Minster Yard, 3–9 Minster Gates	II		House	Early 18th century	14 June 1954	SE6030652114; 53°57′42″N 1°04′56″W	1257246	11 Minster Yard, 3–9 Minster Gates More images	Q26548639
3 Museum Street	II		House	Early 18th century	24 January 1978	SE6010652057; 53°57′40″N 1°05′07″W	1257111	3 Museum Street More images	Q26548517
1 Ogleforth, 14 Goodramgate	II		House	Early 18th century	14 June 1954	SE6052852211; 53°57′45″N 1°04′44″W	1257038	1 Ogleforth, 14 Goodramgate More images	Q26548457
11 Ogleforth	II		House	Early 18th century	14 June 1954	SE6050152233; 53°57′46″N 1°04′46″W	1257046	11 Ogleforth More images	Q26548464
2, 3, 4 and 4A Precentor's Court	II*		House	Early 18th century	14 June 1954	SE6020052203; 53°57′45″N 1°05′02″W	1256904	2, 3, 4 and 4A Precentor's Court More images	Q17549590
5 Precentor's Court	II*		House	Early 18th century	14 June 1954	SE6018552209; 53°57′45″N 1°05′03″W	1256864	5 Precentor's Court More images	Q17549556
Fenton House	II*	9 Precentor's Court	House	Early 18th century	14 June 1954	SE6015652236; 53°57′46″N 1°05′05″W	1256868	Fenton House More images	Q17549561
10 Precentor's Court	II*		House	Early 18th century	14 June 1954	SE6017652254; 53°57′46″N 1°05′03″W	1256869	10 Precentor's Court More images	Q17549565
2 Shambles	II		House	Early 18th century	14 June 1954	SE6045251908; 53°57′35″N 1°04′49″W	1256671	2 Shambles More images	Q26548141
20 Shambles	II		House	Early 18th century	14 June 1954	SE6047851842; 53°57′33″N 1°04′47″W	1256681	20 Shambles	Q26548145
21 Shambles	II		House	Early 18th century	14 June 1954	SE6047951838; 53°57′33″N 1°04′47″W	1256682	21 Shambles More images	Q26548146
1A and 1½ Whip-Ma-Whop-Ma-Gate, 22 and 23 Shambles	II		Shop	Early 18th century	14 June 1954	SE6047951835; 53°57′33″N 1°04′47″W	1256683	1A and 1½ Whip-Ma-Whop-Ma-Gate, 22 and 23 Shambles More images	Q26548147
40 Shambles	II		House	Early 18th century	14 June 1954	SE6044751872; 53°57′34″N 1°04′49″W	1256645	40 Shambles More images	Q26548122
45 Shambles	II		House	Early 18th century	14 June 1954	SE6043651899; 53°57′35″N 1°04′49″W	1256661	45 Shambles More images	Q26548134
St Andrew's House	II	Spen Lane	House	Early 18th century	14 June 1954	SE6062252010; 53°57′38″N 1°04′39″W	1256617	St Andrew's House More images	Q26548099
38 Stonegate	II		House	Early 18th century	1 July 1968	SE6024352059; 53°57′40″N 1°05′00″W	1256528	38 Stonegate More images	Q26548020
45 and 47 Stonegate	II*		House	Early 18th century	14 June 1954	SE6029852076; 53°57′41″N 1°04′57″W	1256489	45 and 47 Stonegate More images	Q17549295
Gateway arch approximately 25 metres south east of Holy Trinity Church porch	II*	Goodramgate	Gates	Early 18th century (arch); early 19th century (gates)	14 June 1954	SE6045652020; 53°57′39″N 1°04′48″W	1257695	Gateway arch approximately 25 metres south east of Holy Trinity Church porch More images	Q17549887
81 Goodramgate	II		House	Early 18th and early 19th century	24 June 1983	SE6045651994; 53°57′38″N 1°04′48″W	1257713	81 Goodramgate More images	Q26549044
4A and 4B Lendal	II		Offices	Early 18th and mid-19th century	14 March 1997	SE6006851962; 53°57′37″N 1°05′10″W	1257484	4A and 4B Lendal More images	Q26548835
St Trinity House	II	3, 4 and 4A King's Square	House	Early 18th to 20th century	14 June 1954	SE6045751919; 53°57′35″N 1°04′48″W	1257520	St Trinity House More images	Q26548867
York College for Girls	II*	62 Low Petergate	House	c. 1725; c. 1866 (partly rebuilt)	14 June 1954	SE6038252049; 53°57′40″N 1°04′52″W	1257410	York College for Girls More images	Q17549783
Mansion House, railings and gas lamps attached to front	I	1 Coney Street	House	1725–1733	14 June 1954	SE6014451922; 53°57′36″N 1°05′05″W	1257969	Mansion House, railings and gas lamps attached to front More images	Q6751751
The Cottage	II	Aldwark	House	1730	14 June 1954	SE6064752128; 53°57′42″N 1°04′38″W	1259573	The Cottage More images	Q26550672
The Assembly Rooms	I	Blake Street	Assembly rooms	1730	14 June 1954	SE6012352039; 53°57′39″N 1°05′07″W	1259521	The Assembly Rooms More images	Q4022894
Sundial approximately 40 metres east of York Minster	II	College Green	Sundial	1730	24 June 1983	SE6044852168; 53°57′43″N 1°04′49″W	1259211	Sundial approximately 40 metres east of York Minster More images	Q26550351
7 Minster Yard	II		House	c. 1730	18 November 1977	SE6041152136; 53°57′42″N 1°04′51″W	1257257	7 Minster Yard More images	Q26548643
34 Stonegate	II		House	c. 1730	1 July 1968	SE6023852043; 53°57′40″N 1°05′00″W	1256523	34 Stonegate More images	Q26548017
York College for Girls	II*	64 and 66 Low Petergate	House	1743	14 June 1954	SE6039752024; 53°57′39″N 1°04′52″W	1257411	York College for Girls More images	Q17549788
Theatre Royal and undercroft	II*	St Leonard's Place	Theatre	1744; 1879–80 (rebuilt)	14 June 1954	SE6012552132; 53°57′42″N 1°05′06″W	1256767	Theatre Royal and undercroft More images	Q3572609
3–9 New Street	II*		House	1746	14 June 1954	SE6024651882; 53°57′34″N 1°05′00″W	1257093	3–9 New Street More images	Q17549632
61 and 63 Low Petergate	II		House	c. 1746	14 June 1954	SE6035252050; 53°57′40″N 1°04′54″W	1257409	61 and 63 Low Petergate More images	Q26548768
18 and 19 Colliergate	II*		House	1748	14 June 1954	SE6051151877; 53°57′34″N 1°04′45″W	1259174	18 and 19 Colliergate More images	Q17550009
11 Blake Street	II		House	Mid-18th century	19 August 1971	SE6017052019; 53°57′39″N 1°05′04″W	1259515	11 Blake Street More images	Q26550623
13 Blake Street	II		House	Mid-18th century	19 August 1971	SE6017152014; 53°57′39″N 1°05′04″W	1259516	13 Blake Street More images	Q26550624
7 Church Street	II		House	Mid-18th century	24 June 1983	SE6039851958; 53°57′37″N 1°04′51″W	1259283	7 Church Street More images	Q26550419
17 Colliergate	II		House	Mid-18th century	1 July 1968	SE6051851869; 53°57′34″N 1°04′45″W	1259172	17 Colliergate More images	Q26550315
25 and 26 Colliergate	II		House	Mid-18th century	14 June 1954	SE6049351915; 53°57′35″N 1°04′46″W	1258015	25 and 26 Colliergate More images	Q26549311
9 Coney Street	II		House	Mid-18th century	24 June 1983	SE6016151880; 53°57′34″N 1°05′05″W	1257974	9 Coney Street More images	Q26549271
13 Coney Street	II		House	Mid-18th century	14 June 1954	SE6018051850; 53°57′33″N 1°05′04″W	1257975	13 Coney Street More images	Q26549272
Dean Court Hotel (part) and railings attached to front steps	II	4, 5 and 6 Duncombe Place	Hotel	Mid-18th century	14 March 1997	SE6017752141; 53°57′43″N 1°05′03″W	1257898	Dean Court Hotel (part) and railings attached to front steps More images	Q26549207
21 Goodramgate	II		House	Mid-18th century	19 August 1971	SE6051752162; 53°57′43″N 1°04′45″W	1257766	21 Goodramgate More images	Q26549092
39 Goodramgate	II		House	Mid-18th century	19 August 1971	SE6048452121; 53°57′42″N 1°04′47″W	1257737	39 Goodramgate More images	Q26549066
77 Goodramgate	II		House	Mid-18th century	19 August 1971	SE6046252002; 53°57′38″N 1°04′48″W	1257712	77 Goodramgate More images	Q26549043
13–23 Lendal	II		House	Mid-18th century	14 June 1954	SE6012651961; 53°57′37″N 1°05′06″W	1257469	13–23 Lendal More images	Q26548820
72 Low Petergate	II		House	Mid-18th century	19 August 1971	SE6041851999; 53°57′38″N 1°04′50″W	1257417	72 Low Petergate More images	Q26548774
3 Monk Bar Court	II		House	Mid-18th century	24 June 1983	SE6053052262; 53°57′46″N 1°04′44″W	1257232	3 Monk Bar Court More images	Q26548627
20 Davygate	II		House	Mid-18th century; mid-19th century (rebuilt)	24 June 1983	SE6026751886; 53°57′34″N 1°04′59″W	1257918	20 Davygate More images	Q26549222
30 Shambles	II		House	Mid-18th century); 1952 (partly rebuilt)	14 June 1954	SE6046451834; 53°57′33″N 1°04′48″W	1256685	30 Shambles More images	Q26548149
46 and 47 Shambles	II		House	Mid-18th century	14 June 1954	SE6043651903; 53°57′35″N 1°04′49″W	1256662	46 and 47 Shambles More images	Q26548135
28 and 30 St Andrewgate	II		House	Mid-18th century	19 August 1971	SE6057552052; 53°57′40″N 1°04′42″W	1256789	28 and 30 St Andrewgate More images	Q26548233
7 St Helen's Square	II		House	Mid-18th century	24 June 1983	SE6018851972; 53°57′37″N 1°05′03″W	1256799	7 St Helen's Square More images	Q26548240
6 St Sampson's Square	II		House	Mid-18th century	19 August 1971	SE6031851920; 53°57′35″N 1°04′56″W	1256730	6 St Sampson's Square More images	Q26548185
The Three Cranes public house	II	11 St Sampson's Square	Public house	Mid-18th century	14 March 1997	SE6035151915; 53°57′35″N 1°04′54″W	1256733	The Three Cranes public house More images	Q26548186
3 Stonegate	II		House	Mid-18th century	14 June 1954	SE6019851984; 53°57′38″N 1°05′02″W	1256566	3 Stonegate More images	Q26548052
15 Stonegate	II*		House	Mid-18th century	14 June 1954	SE6023652020; 53°57′39″N 1°05′00″W	1256510	15 Stonegate More images	Q17549332
18 and 20 Stonegate	II		House	Mid-18th century	1 July 1968	SE6021252020; 53°57′39″N 1°05′02″W	1256513	18 and 20 Stonegate More images	Q26548011
37 Stonegate	II*		House	Mid-18th century	14 June 1954	SE6028552064; 53°57′40″N 1°04′58″W	1256527	37 Stonegate More images	Q17549371
39 Stonegate	II		House	Mid-18th century	14 June 1954	SE6028952068; 53°57′40″N 1°04′57″W	1256483	39 Stonegate More images	Q26547993
9, 9A and 11 Stonegate	II*		House	18th century	14 June 1954	SE6022352000; 53°57′38″N 1°05′01″W	1256537	9, 9A and 11 Stonegate More images	Q17549380
10 Minster Gates	II*		House	c. 1755	14 June 1954	SE6032152111; 53°57′42″N 1°04′56″W	1257247	10 Minster Gates More images	Q17549650
Minster Song School (part)	II	10 Minster Yard	House	c. 1755	14 June 1954	SE6032452115; 53°57′42″N 1°04′55″W	1257261	Minster Song School (part) More images	Q26891606
60 and 62 Aldwark	II		Chapel	1759	14 March 1997	SE6069351991; 53°57′38″N 1°04′35″W	1259570	60 and 62 Aldwark More images	Q26550671
1 Feasegate and 1 St Sampson's Square	II		House	1770	6 November 1972	SE6031251868; 53°57′34″N 1°04′56″W	1257865	1 Feasegate and 1 St Sampson's Square More images	Q26549180
10 Spen Lane, 33 and 35 St Saviourgate	II		House	c. 1770	14 June 1954	SE6064151980; 53°57′37″N 1°04′38″W	1256703	10 Spen Lane, 33 and 35 St Saviourgate More images	Q26548162
The Adams House	II*	52 Low Petergate	House	1772	14 June 1954	SE6034752084; 53°57′41″N 1°04′54″W	1257433	The Adams House More images	Q17549808
Numbers 15–21 (odd) including numbers 19A and 21A and outbuildings attached at rear	II	Blake Street	House	1773	19 August 1971	SE6017252007; 53°57′38″N 1°05′04″W	1259517	Numbers 15–21 (odd) including numbers 19A and 21A and outbuildings attached at rear More images	Q26550625
Theatre House	II	Duncombe Place	House	Late 18th century (rebuilt)	14 June 1954	SE6013352114; 53°57′42″N 1°05′06″W	1257877	Theatre House More images	Q26549188
23 Blake Street	II		House	Late 18th century	19 August 1971	SE6017652002; 53°57′38″N 1°05′04″W	1259519	23 Blake Street More images	Q26550627
25 Blake Street	II		House	Late 18th century	19 August 1971	SE6017451999; 53°57′38″N 1°05′04″W	1259520	25 Blake Street More images	Q26550628
9 Colliergate	II		House	Late 18th century	24 June 1983	SE6048251887; 53°57′34″N 1°04′47″W	1259166	9 Colliergate More images	Q26550309
Numbers 36–42 (even) including number 38A	II*	Coney Street	House	Late 18th century	24 June 1983	SE6023451819; 53°57′32″N 1°05′01″W	1257947	Numbers 36–42 (even) including number 38A More images	Q17549981
6, 8 and 10 Goodramgate	II		Coaching inn	Late 18th century	24 June 1983	SE6053852229; 53°57′45″N 1°04′44″W	1257755	6, 8 and 10 Goodramgate More images	Q26549081
56 and 58 Goodramgate	II		House	Late 18th century	19 August 1971	SE6045652069; 53°57′40″N 1°04′48″W	1257707	56 and 58 Goodramgate More images	Q26549039
57 Goodramgate	II		House	Late 18th century	24 June 1983	SE6047852062; 53°57′40″N 1°04′47″W	1257708	57 Goodramgate More images	Q26549040
15 Grape Lane	II		House	Late 18th century	19 August 1971	SE6031752019; 53°57′39″N 1°04′56″W	1257664	15 Grape Lane More images	Q26548999
Cottage attached at rear of number 25	II	High Petergate	House	Late 18th century	14 June 1954	SE6023852098; 53°57′41″N 1°05′00″W	1257611	Cottage attached at rear of number 25	Q26548948
91 and 93 Low Petergate	II		House	Late 18th century	14 June 1954	SE6039751986; 53°57′38″N 1°04′52″W	1257395	91 and 93 Low Petergate More images	Q26548754
Lendal Hill House	II	Museum Street	Waterworks	Late 18th century	19 August 1971	SE5999651970; 53°57′37″N 1°05′14″W	1257082	Lendal Hill House More images	Q26548494
6 Shambles	II		House	Late 18th century	14 June 1954	SE6045451898; 53°57′35″N 1°04′48″W	1256673	6 Shambles	Q26548143
43 Shambles	II		House	Late 18th century	14 June 1954	SE6044451894; 53°57′35″N 1°04′49″W	1256658	43 Shambles	Q26548132
2 St Sampson's Square	II		House	Late 18th century	6 November 1972	SE6030651869; 53°57′34″N 1°04′57″W	1256712	2 St Sampson's Square More images	Q26548168
Melrose House	II	3 St Sampson's Square	House	Late 18th century	14 June 1954	SE6029651873; 53°57′34″N 1°04′57″W	1256728	Melrose House More images	Q26548183
36 Stonegate	II		House	Late 18th century	1 July 1968	SE6024552049; 53°57′40″N 1°05′00″W	1256526	36 Stonegate More images	Q26548019
Number 23 and attached garden wall and outbuilding	I	High Petergate	House	c. 1779	14 June 1954	SE6024552121; 53°57′42″N 1°05′00″W	1257607	Number 23 and attached garden wall and outbuilding More images	Q107980202
20 St Andrewgate	II*		House	c. 1780	14 June 1954	SE6053351999; 53°57′38″N 1°04′44″W	1256788	20 St Andrewgate More images	Q17549536
Bootham Bar Hotel	II	4 High Petergate	Hotel	1782	14 June 1954	SE6014252234; 53°57′46″N 1°05′05″W	1257615	Bootham Bar Hotel More images	Q26548952
18 Blake Street	II		House	1789–90	14 June 1954	SE6015451991; 53°57′38″N 1°05′05″W	1259518	18 Blake Street More images	Q26550626
26 and 28 Stonegate	II		House	c. 1797	1 July 1968	SE6022852032; 53°57′39″N 1°05′01″W	1256517	26 and 28 Stonegate More images	Q26548013
23 Goodramgate	II		House	c. 1800	19 August 1971	SE6051152159; 53°57′43″N 1°04′45″W	1257726	23 Goodramgate More images	Q26549057
29 and 30 Colliergate	II		House	c. 1800 (No. 29); c. 1845 (No. 30)	1 July 1968	SE6047851950; 53°57′36″N 1°04′47″W	1258005	29 and 30 Colliergate More images	Q26549301
2 Lendal	II		Chapel	1816	24 June 1983	SE6006451982; 53°57′38″N 1°05′10″W	1257482	2 Lendal More images	Q26548833
Purey-Cust Chambers	II	Dean's Park	House	1824–25	24 June 1983	SE6022452273; 53°57′47″N 1°05′01″W	1257882	Purey-Cust Chambers More images	Q26549192
4 and 6 Chapter House Street	II		House	Early 19th century (converted)	14 June 1954	SE6043952268; 53°57′47″N 1°04′49″W	1259319	4 and 6 Chapter House Street More images	Q26550449
Joseph Terry House	II	Breary's Court, St Helen's Square	House	Early 19th century	27 January 1995	SE6013651971; 53°57′37″N 1°05′06″W	1256759	Upload Photo	Q26548212
28 Colliergate	II		House	Early 19th century	1 July 1968	SE6048351939; 53°57′36″N 1°04′47″W	1258003	28 Colliergate More images	Q26549299
Number 28A and attached drill hall	II	Colliergate	House	Early 19th century	1 July 1968	SE6047751942; 53°57′36″N 1°04′47″W	1258004	Number 28A and attached drill hall More images	Q26549300
15 and 17 Coney Street	II		House	Early 19th century	19 August 1971	SE6018651841; 53°57′33″N 1°05′03″W	1257977	15 and 17 Coney Street More images	Q26549274
23 Coney Street	II		House	Early 19th century	31 December 1980	SE6019351794; 53°57′31″N 1°05′03″W	1257980	23 Coney Street More images	Q26549276
29 Goodramgate	II		House	Early 19th century	24 June 1983	SE6049252145; 53°57′43″N 1°04′46″W	1257730	29 Goodramgate More images	Q26549061
44 Goodramgate	II		House	Early 19th century	24 June 1983	SE6046352102; 53°57′41″N 1°04′48″W	1257740	44 Goodramgate More images	Q26549068
46 Goodramgate	II		House	Early 19th century	24 June 1983	SE6046252098; 53°57′41″N 1°04′48″W	1257741	46 Goodramgate More images	Q26549069
21 Grape Lane	II		House	Early 19th century	14 March 1997	SE6030652007; 53°57′38″N 1°04′57″W	1257668	21 Grape Lane More images	Q26549003
1A and 1B High Petergate	II		House	Early 19th century	1 July 1968	SE6013052219; 53°57′45″N 1°05′06″W	1257633	1A and 1B High Petergate More images	Q26548968
13 High Petergate	II		House	Early 19th century	19 August 1971	SE6017152184; 53°57′44″N 1°05′04″W	1257601	13 High Petergate More images	Q26548940
1 King's Square, 85, 87 and 89 Goodramgate	II		House	Early 19th century	24 June 1983	SE6044851977; 53°57′37″N 1°04′49″W	1257715	1 King's Square, 85, 87 and 89 Goodramgate	Q26549046
Number 26 and the Lendal Cellars public house	II	Lendal	Public house	Early 19th century	9 February 1988	SE6010351926; 53°57′36″N 1°05′08″W	1257472	Number 26 and the Lendal Cellars public house More images	Q26548823
8 and 10 Little Stonegate	II		House	c. 1825	14 March 1997	SE6026851989; 53°57′38″N 1°04′59″W	1257480	8 and 10 Little Stonegate More images	Q26548831
65 Low Petergate	II		Shop	Early 19th century	14 June 1954	SE6035552046; 53°57′40″N 1°04′54″W	1257413	65 Low Petergate More images	Q26548770
74 Low Petergate	II		House	Early 19th century	19 August 1971	SE6042251995; 53°57′38″N 1°04′50″W	1257420	74 Low Petergate More images	Q26548776
Number 5 and attached front garden railings	II*	Minster Yard	House	Early 19th century	14 June 1954	SE6041952204; 53°57′45″N 1°04′50″W	1257255	Number 5 and attached front garden railings More images	Q17549661
1 and 2 Monk Bar Court	II		House	Early 19th century	14 March 1997	SE6053652254; 53°57′46″N 1°04′44″W	1257231	1 and 2 Monk Bar Court More images	Q26548626
11 Newgate	II		House	Early 19th century	14 March 1997	SE6041351899; 53°57′35″N 1°04′51″W	1257060	11 Newgate More images	Q26548476
9 Ogleforth	II		House	Early 19th century	14 June 1954	SE6050752227; 53°57′45″N 1°04′45″W	1257045	9 Ogleforth More images	Q26548463
3, 4 and 5 Shambles	II		House	Early 19th century	1 July 1968	SE6045451905; 53°57′35″N 1°04′48″W	1256672	3, 4 and 5 Shambles More images	Q26548142
14 Shambles	II*		House	Early 19th century	14 June 1954	SE6046451869; 53°57′34″N 1°04′48″W	1256679	14 Shambles More images	Q17549459
32 Stonegate	II		House	Early 19th century	1 July 1968	SE6023352039; 53°57′39″N 1°05′00″W	1256521	32 Stonegate More images	Q26548016
48 and 50 St Andrewgate	II		House	c. 1825	14 March 1997	SE6059452087; 53°57′41″N 1°04′41″W	1256791	48 and 50 St Andrewgate More images	Q26548235
51 Stonegate, 37 and 39 Low Petergate	II		House	1827–28	1 July 1968	SE6030752084; 53°57′41″N 1°04′56″W	1257453	51 Stonegate, 37 and 39 Low Petergate More images	Q26548805
5 St Helen's Square	II		Bank	1829–30	1 July 1968	SE6016451975; 53°57′37″N 1°05′04″W	1256798	5 St Helen's Square More images	Q26548239
8, 9 and 10 College Street	II		House	c. 1830	14 June 1954	SE6046952182; 53°57′44″N 1°04′47″W	1259193	8, 9 and 10 College Street More images	Q26550334
Minster Song School (part)	II	Minster Yard	School	1830–1833	14 June 1954	SE6042852078; 53°57′41″N 1°04′50″W	1257229	Minster Song School (part) More images	Q26548624
Numbers 1–9 (consecutive) and railings attached to front wall	II*	St Leonard's Place	House	1834	14 June 1954	SE6007852161; 53°57′43″N 1°05′09″W	1256761	Numbers 1–9 (consecutive) and railings attached to front wall More images	Q17549521
De Grey House and attached front railings, gate and lamp standard	II*	St Leonard's Place	House	1835	1 July 1968	SE6011652185; 53°57′44″N 1°05′07″W	1256764	De Grey House and attached front railings, gate and lamp standard More images	Q17549526
15 St Sampson's Square	II		House	1835–1840	24 June 1983	SE6035851888; 53°57′34″N 1°04′54″W	1256690	15 St Sampson's Square More images	Q26548153
13 and 14 St Sampson's Square and 2 Silver Street	II		House	1835–1840	24 June 1983	SE6036251893; 53°57′35″N 1°04′54″W	1256689	13 and 14 St Sampson's Square and 2 Silver Street More images	Q26548152
1 Church Street	II		House	1836–1839	24 June 1983	SE6035851914; 53°57′35″N 1°04′54″W	1259281	1 Church Street More images	Q26550417
2 Church Street	II		House	1836–1839	24 June 1983	SE6036451917; 53°57′35″N 1°04′53″W	1259282	2 Church Street More images	Q26550418
10 Church Street	II		House	1836–1839	24 June 1983	SE6041351964; 53°57′37″N 1°04′51″W	1259284	10 Church Street More images	Q26550420
11 Church Street	II		House	1836–1839	24 June 1983	SE6041651970; 53°57′37″N 1°04′51″W	1259285	11 Church Street More images	Q26550421
12 and 12A Church Street	II		House	1836–1839	24 June 1983	SE6043051957; 53°57′37″N 1°04′50″W	1259286	12 and 12A Church Street More images	Q26550422
13, 14 and 14A Church Street	II		House	1836–1839	24 June 1983	SE6041651947; 53°57′36″N 1°04′51″W	1259287	13, 14 and 14A Church Street More images	Q26550423
15–18 Church Street	II		House	1836–1839	24 June 1983	SE6040951935; 53°57′36″N 1°04′51″W	1259288	15–18 Church Street More images	Q26550424
8 and 9 Parliament Street	II		House	1836–1839	14 March 1997	SE6038251789; 53°57′31″N 1°04′52″W	1257029	8 and 9 Parliament Street More images	Q26548448
14 Parliament Street	II		House	1836–1839	24 June 1983	SE6034451824; 53°57′32″N 1°04′55″W	1256989	14 Parliament Street More images	Q26548408
15 Parliament Street	II		House	1836–1839	24 June 1983	SE6034251833; 53°57′33″N 1°04′55″W	1256991	15 Parliament Street More images	Q26548410
16 Parliament Street	II		House	1836–1839	24 June 1983	SE6033651838; 53°57′33″N 1°04′55″W	1256992	16 Parliament Street More images	Q26548411
17 and 18 Parliament Street	II		House	1836–1839	24 June 1983	SE6033051844; 53°57′33″N 1°04′55″W	1256993	17 and 18 Parliament Street More images	Q26548412
19, 20 and 21 Parliament Street	II		House	1836–1839	24 June 1983	SE6032451850; 53°57′33″N 1°04′56″W	1256996	19, 20 and 21 Parliament Street More images	Q26548415
22 Parliament Street	II		House	1836–1839	14 March 1997	SE6035451883; 53°57′34″N 1°04′54″W	1256997	22 Parliament Street More images	Q26548416
23 and 24 Parliament Street	II		House	1836–1839	14 March 1997	SE6036051882; 53°57′34″N 1°04′54″W	1256998	23 and 24 Parliament Street More images	Q26548417
29 and 30 Parliament Street	II		House	1836–1839	24 June 1983	SE6037351868; 53°57′34″N 1°04′53″W	1257000	29 and 30 Parliament Street More images	Q26548419
31 and 32 Parliament Street	II		House	1836–1839	24 June 1983	SE6037651859; 53°57′33″N 1°04′53″W	1257001	31 and 32 Parliament Street More images	Q26548420
33 Parliament Street	II		House	1836–1839	24 June 1983	SE6039251847; 53°57′33″N 1°04′52″W	1257004	33 Parliament Street More images	Q26548423
34 Parliament Street	II		House	1836–1839	24 June 1983	SE6039151838; 53°57′33″N 1°04′52″W	1257006	34 Parliament Street More images	Q26548425
35 and 36 Parliament Street	II		House	1836–1839	24 June 1983	SE6039551833; 53°57′33″N 1°04′52″W	1257008	35 and 36 Parliament Street More images	Q26548427
37 Parliament Street	II		House	1836–1839	24 June 1983	SE6040051827; 53°57′32″N 1°04′51″W	1256968	37 Parliament Street More images	Q26548388
38 Parliament Street	II		House	1836–1839	24 June 1983	SE6040451821; 53°57′32″N 1°04′51″W	1256970	38 Parliament Street More images	Q26548390
39 Parliament Street	II		House	1836–1839	24 June 1983	SE6040751817; 53°57′32″N 1°04′51″W	1256971	39 Parliament Street More images	Q26548391
44 Parliament Street	II		Offices	1836–1839	24 June 1983	SE6042951792; 53°57′31″N 1°04′50″W	1256972	44 Parliament Street More images	Q26548392
45 and 46 Parliament Street	II		House	1836–1839	24 June 1983	SE6043651789; 53°57′31″N 1°04′50″W	1256974	45 and 46 Parliament Street More images	Q26548394
12 St Sampson's Square and 1A Church Street	II		House	1836–1839	24 June 1983	SE6035551909; 53°57′35″N 1°04′54″W	1256734	12 St Sampson's Square and 1A Church Street More images	Q26548187
Minster Song School (part)	II	8 and 9 Minster Yard	School	1837	14 June 1954	SE6034152103; 53°57′41″N 1°04′55″W	1257259	Minster Song School (part) More images	Q26681818
48 Low Petergate	II		House	1838	1 July 1968	SE6033052091; 53°57′41″N 1°04′55″W	1257429	48 Low Petergate More images	Q26548784
50 Low Petergate	II		House	1838	1 July 1968	SE6033752088; 53°57′41″N 1°04′55″W	1257431	50 Low Petergate More images	Q26548786
York Arms (numbers 24 and 26)	II	High Petergate, 1 Precentor's Court	Public house	1838	1 July 1968	SE6020652185; 53°57′44″N 1°05′02″W	1257609	York Arms (numbers 24 and 26) More images	Q26548947
Gates and railings to Dean's Park	II		Gates	1839	14 March 1997	SE6033852289; 53°57′47″N 1°04′55″W	1257879	Gates and railings to Dean's Park More images	Q26549190
Railings and gates attached to north west corner of York Minster	II	Dean's Park	Gates	1839	14 March 1997	SE6023652201; 53°57′45″N 1°05′00″W	1257884	Railings and gates attached to north west corner of York Minster More images	Q26549194
42, 42A, 44 and 46 Low Petergate	II		House	1839	1 July 1968	SE6032152097; 53°57′41″N 1°04′56″W	1257426	42, 42A, 44 and 46 Low Petergate More images	Q26548781
40 Low Petergate, 2–8 Minster Gates	II		House	c. 1840	1 July 1968	SE6031452103; 53°57′41″N 1°04′56″W	1257245	40 Low Petergate, 2–8 Minster Gates More images	Q26548638
99 Low Petergate	II		House	c. 1840	19 August 1971	SE6041851974; 53°57′37″N 1°04′50″W	1257399	99 Low Petergate More images	Q26548758
2 and 2A High Petergate	II		House	c. 1840	1 July 1968	SE6013852239; 53°57′46″N 1°05′06″W	1257613	2 and 2A High Petergate More images	Q26548950
20 and 22 High Petergate	II		House	c. 1840	1 July 1968	SE6018252193; 53°57′44″N 1°05′03″W	1257605	20 and 22 High Petergate More images	Q26548944
10 Colliergate	II		House	c. 1840	24 June 1983	SE6048551880; 53°57′34″N 1°04′47″W	1259167	10 Colliergate More images	Q26550310
31 Colliergate	II		House	c. 1840	1 July 1968	SE6047451956; 53°57′37″N 1°04′47″W	1257968	31 Colliergate More images	Q26549266
4 and 6 Feasegate	II		House	c. 1840	24 June 1983	SE6032151836; 53°57′33″N 1°04′56″W	1257831	4 and 6 Feasegate More images	Q26549150
1 John Saville Court, 5 and 7 Ogleforth	II		House	c. 1840	24 June 1983	SE6051452220; 53°57′45″N 1°04′45″W	1257043	1 John Saville Court, 5 and 7 Ogleforth	Q26548461
8 Lendal	II		House	c. 1840	24 June 1983	SE6007751977; 53°57′37″N 1°05′09″W	1257485	8 Lendal More images	Q26548836
15 Market Street	II		House	c. 1840	14 March 1997	SE6033651772; 53°57′31″N 1°04′55″W	1257368	15 Market Street More images	Q26548731
12 Minster Yard	II		Offices	c. 1840	1 July 1968	SE6029952118; 53°57′42″N 1°04′57″W	1257262	12 Minster Yard More images	Q26548648
27 and 28 Shambles	II		House	c. 1840	14 June 1954	SE6046851820; 53°57′32″N 1°04′48″W	1256684	27 and 28 Shambles More images	Q26548148
29 Stonegate	II		House	c. 1840	1 July 1968	SE6026352043; 53°57′39″N 1°04′59″W	1256519	29 Stonegate More images	Q26548015
4 Spurriergate	II		House	c. 1841	24 June 1983	SE6027051735; 53°57′30″N 1°04′59″W	1256619	4 Spurriergate More images	Q26548101
6 Spurriergate	II		House	c. 1841	24 June 1983	SE6027251732; 53°57′29″N 1°04′59″W	1256576	6 Spurriergate More images	Q26548060
8 and 10 Spurriergate	II		House	c. 1841	24 June 1983	SE6027651729; 53°57′29″N 1°04′58″W	1256585	8 and 10 Spurriergate More images	Q26548068
12, 14 and 16 Spurriergate	II		House	c. 1841	24 June 1983	SE6028151722; 53°57′29″N 1°04′58″W	1256588	12, 14 and 16 Spurriergate More images	Q26548071
18–24 Spurriergate	II		House	c. 1841	24 June 1983	SE6028951714; 53°57′29″N 1°04′58″W	1256590	18–24 Spurriergate More images	Q26548073
De Grey Rooms and attached gates, railings and lamp standards	II*	St Leonard's Place	Assembly rooms	1841–42	14 June 1954	SE6011652202; 53°57′45″N 1°05′07″W	1256766	De Grey Rooms and attached gates, railings and lamp standards More images	Q17549531
Purey-Cust Lodge, attached walls and gateways	II	Dean's Park	House	1845	24 June 1983	SE6022752212; 53°57′45″N 1°05′01″W	1257883	Purey-Cust Lodge, attached walls and gateways More images	Q26549193
2 and 4 Goodramgate	II		House	1845	24 June 1983	SE6054252249; 53°57′46″N 1°04′43″W	1257753	2 and 4 Goodramgate More images	Q26549079
32–38 St Andrewgate	II		Fire station	1845	24 June 1983	SE6057652063; 53°57′40″N 1°04′42″W	1256790	32–38 St Andrewgate More images	Q26548234
Yorkshire Insurance Company and railings attached to front	II	1 St Helen's Square	Offices	1846–47	1 July 1968	SE6015251952; 53°57′37″N 1°05′05″W	1256794	Yorkshire Insurance Company and railings attached to front More images	Q26548236
25 Coney Street	II		Shop	Mid-19th century	14 March 1997	SE6019751781; 53°57′31″N 1°05′03″W	1257982	25 Coney Street More images	Q26549278
35 and 37 Coney Street	II		House	Mid-19th century	24 June 1983	SE6021951766; 53°57′31″N 1°05′01″W	1257946	35 and 37 Coney Street More images	Q26549247
41 Coney Street	II		House	Mid-19th century	14 March 1997	SE6023451748; 53°57′30″N 1°05′01″W	1257953	41 Coney Street More images	Q26549253
50 Coney Street	II		House	Mid-19th century	14 March 1997	SE6026351771; 53°57′31″N 1°04′59″W	1257960	50 Coney Street More images	Q26549259
19, 21 and 23 Feasegate	II		House	Mid-19th century	14 March 1997	SE6029751804; 53°57′32″N 1°04′57″W	1257835	19, 21 and 23 Feasegate More images	Q26549154
7 Goodramgate	II		Shop	Mid-19th century	24 June 1983	SE6054952200; 53°57′44″N 1°04′43″W	1257756	7 Goodramgate More images	Q26549082
9 and 11 Goodramgate	II		Shop	Mid-19th century	24 June 1983	SE6054152187; 53°57′44″N 1°04′43″W	1257758	9 and 11 Goodramgate More images	Q26549084
13 and 15 Goodramgate	II		House	Mid-19th century; c. 1972 (rebuilt)	14 June 1954	SE6053252175; 53°57′44″N 1°04′44″W	1257759	13 and 15 Goodramgate More images	Q26549085
36 Goodramgate	II		House	Mid-19th century	19 August 1971	SE6046652123; 53°57′42″N 1°04′48″W	1257735	36 Goodramgate More images	Q26549064
42 Goodramgate	II		House	Mid-19th century	24 June 1983	SE6046452108; 53°57′42″N 1°04′48″W	1257739	42 Goodramgate More images	Q26549067
83 Goodramgate	II		House	Mid-19th century	24 June 1983	SE6045451987; 53°57′38″N 1°04′48″W	1257714	83 Goodramgate More images	Q26549045
45 and 47 Low Petergate	II		House	Mid-19th century	19 August 1971	SE6031552078; 53°57′41″N 1°04′56″W	1257428	45 and 47 Low Petergate More images	Q26548783
49 and 51 Low Petergate	II		Hotel	Mid-19th century	14 March 1997	SE6032752071; 53°57′40″N 1°04′55″W	1257430	49 and 51 Low Petergate More images	Q26548785
69 Low Petergate	II		House	Mid-19th century	1 July 1968	SE6036152040; 53°57′39″N 1°04′53″W	1257415	69 Low Petergate More images	Q26548772
4 and 6 Market Street	II		House	Mid-19th century	14 March 1997	SE6027751771; 53°57′31″N 1°04′58″W	1257404	4 and 6 Market Street More images	Q26548763
5–13 Market Street	II		House	Mid-19th century	4 January 1996	SE6031151774; 53°57′31″N 1°04′56″W	1257405	5–13 Market Street More images	Q26548764
19 Market Street	II		Public house	Mid-19th century	24 June 1983	SE6033451794; 53°57′31″N 1°04′55″W	1257369	19 Market Street More images	Q26548732
The Burns Hotel	II	23 Market Street	Public house	Mid-19th century	24 June 1983	SE6035351791; 53°57′31″N 1°04′54″W	1257372	The Burns Hotel More images	Q26548735
4–7 Monk Bar Court	II		House	Mid-19th century	14 March 1997	SE6051452274; 53°57′47″N 1°04′45″W	1257233	4–7 Monk Bar Court More images	Q26548628
1 and 1A Peter Lane	II		House	Mid-19th century	14 June 1954	SE6031851766; 53°57′31″N 1°04′56″W	1256901	1 and 1A Peter Lane More images	Q26548326
6 and 7 Precentor's Court	II		House	Mid-19th century	1 July 1968	SE6017852213; 53°57′45″N 1°05′03″W	1256866	6 and 7 Precentor's Court More images	Q26548299
1 and 1A Stonegate	II		House	Mid-19th century	1 July 1968	SE6019551979; 53°57′37″N 1°05′03″W	1256564	1 and 1A Stonegate More images	Q26548050
Number 5 and outbuildings attached at rear	II	Stonegate	House	Mid-19th century	1 July 1968	SE6020551991; 53°57′38″N 1°05′02″W	1256571	Number 5 and outbuildings attached at rear More images	Q26548056
Gates and railings attached to front of number 10	II	Precentor's Court	Gates	19th century	14 June 1954	SE6017152242; 53°57′46″N 1°05′04″W	1256872	Gates and railings attached to front of number 10 More images	Q26548303
34 Shambles	II		House	19th century; c. 1960 (rebuilt)	14 June 1954	SE6045551852; 53°57′33″N 1°04′48″W	1256687	34 Shambles More images	Q26548151
3 Little Stonegate	II		Chapel	1851	24 June 1983	SE6024951982; 53°57′38″N 1°05′00″W	1257478	3 Little Stonegate More images	Q26548829
Numbers 2 and 4 and railings attached to front and left side	II	Museum Street	House	1851	3 August 1992	SE6009152077; 53°57′41″N 1°05′08″W	1257108	Numbers 2 and 4 and railings attached to front and left side More images	Q26548514
Gates and railings approximately 20 metres south west of number 9 the Judges' Lodging	II	Lendal	Gates	c. 1853	14 March 1997	SE6009451982; 53°57′38″N 1°05′08″W	1257489	Gates and railings approximately 20 metres south west of number 9 the Judges' Lodging More images	Q26548839
5 Goodramgate	II		Chapel	1858	24 June 1983	SE6055552209; 53°57′45″N 1°04′43″W	1257754	5 Goodramgate More images	Q26549080
1 Museum Street	II		Offices	1860	8 October 1986	SE6011852066; 53°57′40″N 1°05′07″W	1257106	1 Museum Street More images	Q26548512
Ebor Hall, building to rear of number 19 (number 19 not included)	II	Coney Street	Hall	c. 1860	25 April 1996	SE6016251803; 53°57′32″N 1°05′05″W	1257927	Ebor Hall, building to rear of number 19 (number 19 not included) More images	Q26549231
Lamp standard approximately 10 metres west of York Minster	II	Minster Yard	Lamp standard	c. 1860	14 March 1997	SE6023752180; 53°57′44″N 1°05′00″W	1257225	Lamp standard approximately 10 metres west of York Minster More images	Q26548621
Railings and gates attached to north east corner of York Minster	II	Minster Yard	Gates	c. 1860	14 March 1997	SE6039352213; 53°57′45″N 1°04′52″W	1257227	Railings and gates attached to north east corner of York Minster More images	Q26548623
East lodge of Lendal Bridge, Lendal Bridge and attached tollhouses	II	Museum Street	Bridge	1861–1863	1 July 1968	SE5998451924; 53°57′36″N 1°05′14″W	1257475	East lodge of Lendal Bridge, Lendal Bridge and attached tollhouses More images	Q26548826
Masonic Hall	II	Duncombe Place	Hall	1862–63	14 March 1997	SE6020152082; 53°57′41″N 1°05′02″W	1257873	Masonic Hall More images	Q26681826
Church of St Wilfrid	II	Duncombe Place	Church	1862–1864	1 July 1968	SE6015152127; 53°57′42″N 1°05′05″W	1257869	Church of St Wilfrid More images	Q7595635
Dean Court Hotel (part) and attached railings	II	1, 2 and 3 Duncombe Place	Hotel	c. 1864	1 July 1968	SE6019052153; 53°57′43″N 1°05′03″W	1257897	Dean Court Hotel (part) and attached railings More images	Q26549206
River House and attached area walls and railings	II	17 Museum Street	House	1868	19 August 1971	SE6004051978; 53°57′37″N 1°05′11″W	1257074	River House and attached area walls and railings More images	Q26548487
47 and 49 Aldwark	II		School	1870–1901	14 March 1997	SE6071252000; 53°57′38″N 1°04′34″W	1259569	47 and 49 Aldwark More images	Q26550670
1 and 2 Colliergate	II		Shop	Late 19th century	19 August 1971	SE6046251920; 53°57′35″N 1°04′48″W	1258035	1 and 2 Colliergate More images	Q26549329
8 Colliergate	II		House	Late 19th century	14 March 1997	SE6048051892; 53°57′35″N 1°04′47″W	1259165	8 Colliergate More images	Q26550308
1 and 3 Goodramgate	II		House	Late 19th century	24 June 1983	SE6056152227; 53°57′45″N 1°04′42″W	1257751	1 and 3 Goodramgate More images	Q26549077
50 Goodramgate	II		House	Late 19th century	14 March 1997	SE6046052084; 53°57′41″N 1°04′48″W	1257703	50 Goodramgate More images	Q26549035
Lendal House	II	11 Lendal	Offices	Late 19th century	14 March 1997	SE6011151976; 53°57′37″N 1°05′07″W	1257493	Lendal House More images	Q26548842
2 Stonegate	II		House	Late 19th century	19 August 1971	SE6018251991; 53°57′38″N 1°05′03″W	1256565	2 Stonegate More images	Q26548051
41 Stonegate	II		House	Late 19th century	24 June 1983	SE6029452069; 53°57′40″N 1°04′57″W	1256485	41 Stonegate More images	Q26547995
87 Low Petergate	II		House	Late 19th century (remodelled)	14 June 1954	SE6039052003; 53°57′38″N 1°04′52″W	1257392	87 Low Petergate More images	Q26548752
Club Chambers and railings attached at front	II	15 Museum Street	Offices	1875	14 March 1997	SE6005051992; 53°57′38″N 1°05′11″W	1257113	Club Chambers and railings attached at front More images	Q26548519
Drinking fountain	II	Museum Street	Drinking fountain	1880	24 June 1983	SE6005152034; 53°57′39″N 1°05′10″W	1257081	Drinking fountain More images	Q26548493
2 and 2A Coney Street	II		Shop	c. 1880	14 March 1997	SE6017351922; 53°57′36″N 1°05′04″W	1257971	2 and 2A Coney Street More images	Q26549268
34 Coney Street	II		Shop	c. 1880	14 March 1997	SE6023051823; 53°57′32″N 1°05′01″W	1257944	34 Coney Street More images	Q26549245
15 High Petergate	II		House	1882	14 March 1997	SE6017752181; 53°57′44″N 1°05′03″W	1257602	15 High Petergate More images	Q26548941
5 and 7 Feasegate	II		Shop	1884	24 June 1983	SE6030851851; 53°57′33″N 1°04′57″W	1257832	5 and 7 Feasegate More images	Q26549151
General Post Office	II	22 Lendal	Post office	1884	14 March 1997	SE6013351937; 53°57′36″N 1°05′06″W	1257470	General Post Office More images	Q26548821
Crown Buildings	II	Duncombe Place	Offices	1885	14 March 1997	SE6018652095; 53°57′41″N 1°05′03″W	1257872	Crown Buildings More images	Q26549186
Parish room of St Crux and wall attached to north west corner	II*	Shambles	Parish room	1888	14 June 1954	SE6049751832; 53°57′33″N 1°04′46″W	1256664	Parish room of St Crux and wall attached to north west corner More images	Q17549428
Municipal offices and Council Chamber and Guildhall Annex	II*	Coney Street (west off)	Offices	1889–1891; 1901–1903	24 June 1983	SE6007751910; 53°57′35″N 1°05′09″W	1257939	Municipal offices and Council Chamber and Guildhall Annex More images	Q26263476
Number 8 and Gray's Dispensary	II	Duncombe Place	Dispensary	1897–1899	13 October 1975	SE6016752081; 53°57′41″N 1°05′04″W	1257867	Number 8 and Gray's Dispensary More images	Q26549182
15 Davygate	II		Cafe	1898	14 March 1997	SE6026851920; 53°57′36″N 1°04′59″W	1257916	15 Davygate More images	Q26549220
Wall, gates and gate piers approximately 90 metres south west of number 1	II*	Minster Yard	Wall	c. 1900	14 June 1954	SE6036252268; 53°57′47″N 1°04′53″W	1257250	Wall, gates and gate piers approximately 90 metres south west of number 1 More images	Q17549653
Barclays Bank	II	1, 2 and 3 Parliament Street	Bank	1901	13 October 1975	SE6040751759; 53°57′30″N 1°04′51″W	1257027	Barclays Bank More images	Q26548446
The Cross Keys and attached yard gateway and wall	II	34 Goodramgate	Public house	1904	14 March 1997	SE6046652138; 53°57′42″N 1°04′48″W	1257733	The Cross Keys and attached yard gateway and wall More images	Q26549063
South African War Memorial	II*	Duncombe Place	War memorial	1905	1 July 1968	SE6021552119; 53°57′42″N 1°05′01″W	1257874	South African War Memorial More images	Q111936599
Boots the Chemist	II	48 Coney Street	Shop	1907	24 June 1983	SE6025751775; 53°57′31″N 1°04′59″W	1257956	Boots the Chemist More images	Q26549256
14 Coney Street, 10 New Street	II		House	1907	18 September 1992	SE6019751871; 53°57′34″N 1°05′03″W	1257976	14 Coney Street, 10 New Street More images	Q26549273
3 St Helen's Square	II		Shop	1922	5 December 1974	SE6016251961; 53°57′37″N 1°05′04″W	1256797	3 St Helen's Square More images	Q26548238
The Yorkshire Bank	II	46 Coney Street	Bank	1922–23	14 March 1997	SE6024951784; 53°57′31″N 1°05′00″W	1257954	The Yorkshire Bank More images	Q26549254
Meeting room, former muniment room and cells on south side of Guildhall	II	Coney Street (west side off)	Meeting room	Early 20th century	16 March 2016	SE6011251889; 53°57′35″N 1°05′07″W	1433732	Meeting room, former muniment room and cells on south side of Guildhall More images	Q26677961
Central Library	II	Museum Street	Library	1927	14 March 1997	SE6004752089; 53°57′41″N 1°05′11″W	1257077	Central Library	Q8055614
2 Davygate, 2–8 St Helen's Square	II		Shop	1929–30	14 March 1997	SE6018651934; 53°57′36″N 1°05′03″W	1256795	2 Davygate, 2–8 St Helen's Square More images	Q26548237
The Roman Bath public house	II*	9 St Sampson's Square	Public house	1929–1931	14 June 1954	SE6034051927; 53°57′36″N 1°04′55″W	1256732	The Roman Bath public house More images	Q17549513
Former Burton's Tailors	II	52 Coney Street	Shop	1931	14 March 1997	SE6026851765; 53°57′30″N 1°04′59″W	1257962	Former Burton's Tailors More images	Q26549261
Telephone box adjoining St Wilfrid's Church	II	Duncombe Place	Telephone box	1935	3 September 1987	SE6014052107; 53°57′42″N 1°05′06″W	1257870	Telephone box adjoining St Wilfrid's Church More images	Q26549185
The Deanery	II	Minster Yard	House	1938–39	14 March 1997	SE6034052347; 53°57′49″N 1°04′54″W	1257230	The Deanery More images	Q26548625

== See also ==
- Grade I listed buildings in North Yorkshire
- Grade II* listed buildings in North Yorkshire
