= 25 Goodramgate =

Listed building in York, England

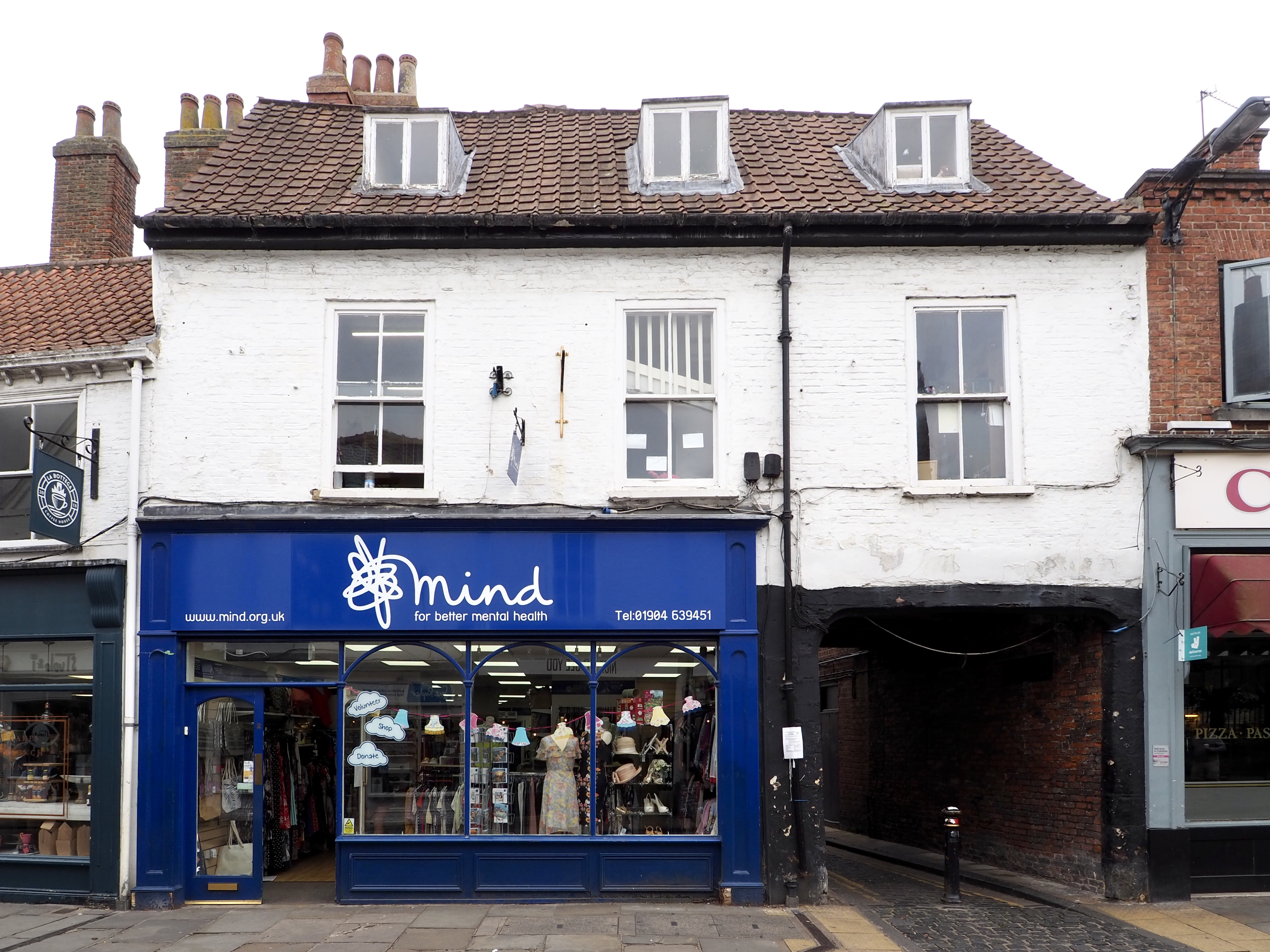
- The building in 2022

- Location within North Yorkshire

General information
- Location: Goodramgate, York, England
- Coordinates: 53°57′43″N 1°04′45″W
- Year built: 16th century
- Renovated: Late 17th century (partly rebuilt); 18th century (altered); 20th century (shopfront)

Listed Building – Grade II
- Official name: 25, Goodramgate
- Designated: 14 June 1954
- Reference no.: 1257729

25 Goodramgate is a historic building in the city centre of York, England.

The oldest part of the property is the archway providing access from Goodramgate into Bedern, which dates from the 16th century. The rest of the property was rebuilt as a house around 1600, then in 1690 was partly rebuilt by James Kiplin. In the 18th century, the ground floor of the building was reconstructed in brick. A shopfront was inserted on the ground floor in the 20th century, and the building was Grade II listed in 1954. It is in retail use, and in 2025 opened as The Gothelie Station, a Victorian Gothic themed shop.

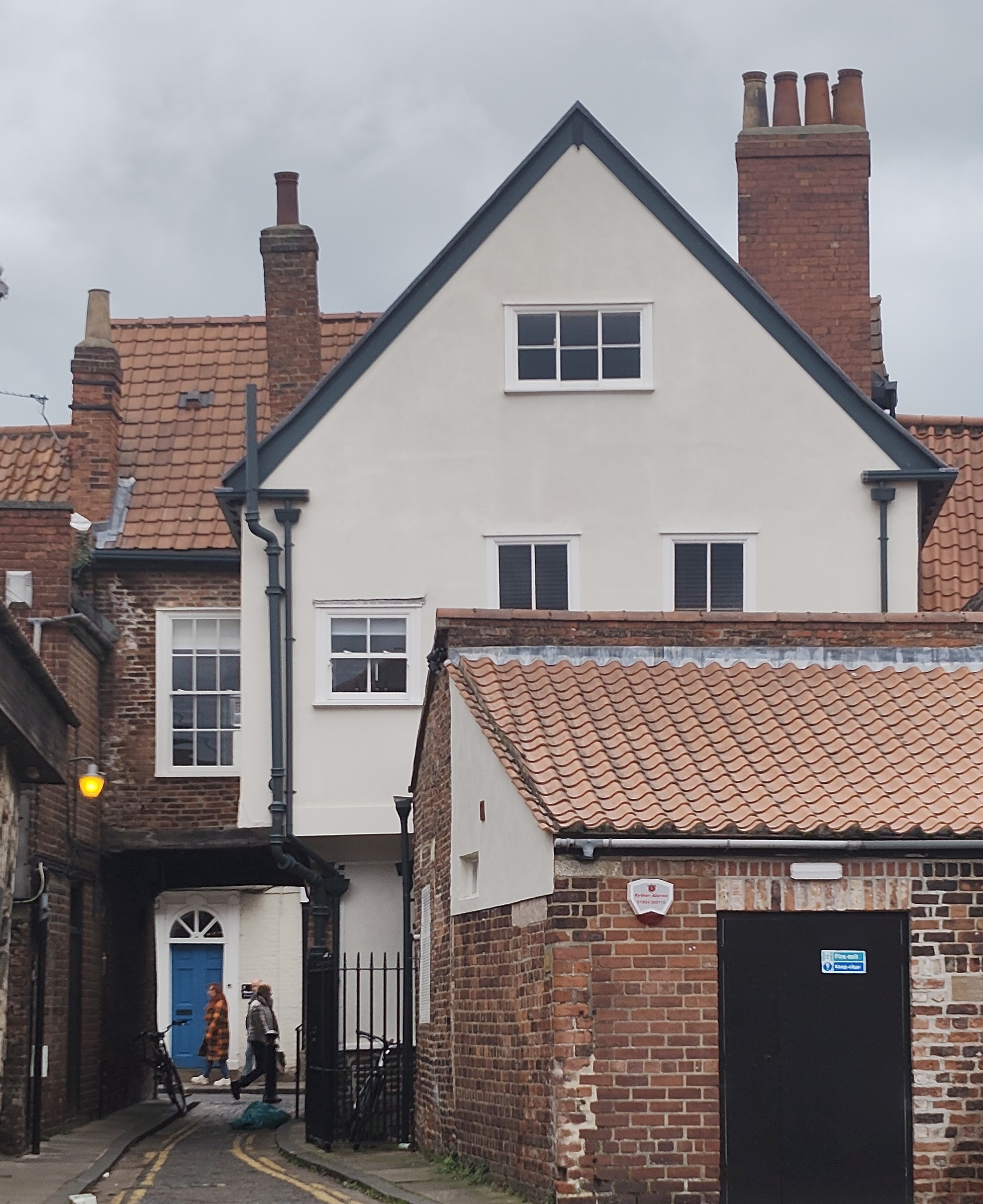
Rear of the building, seen from Bedern

The building is timber-framed at the rear, and constructed of orange-brown brick elsewhere, painted at the front. It has a pantile roof, with brick chimneystacks and three dormer windows. It has two storeys and an attic, and is three bays wide. The rightmost bay incorporates the flattened arch to Bedern. Most of the windows are sashes. At the rear there is a gable wall, jettied to both sides. Inside, on the first floor, there is some 17th-century panelling and a fireplace of similar date.

== See also ==
- Listed buildings in York (within the city walls, northern part)
