= 43 The Shambles =

Listed building in York, England

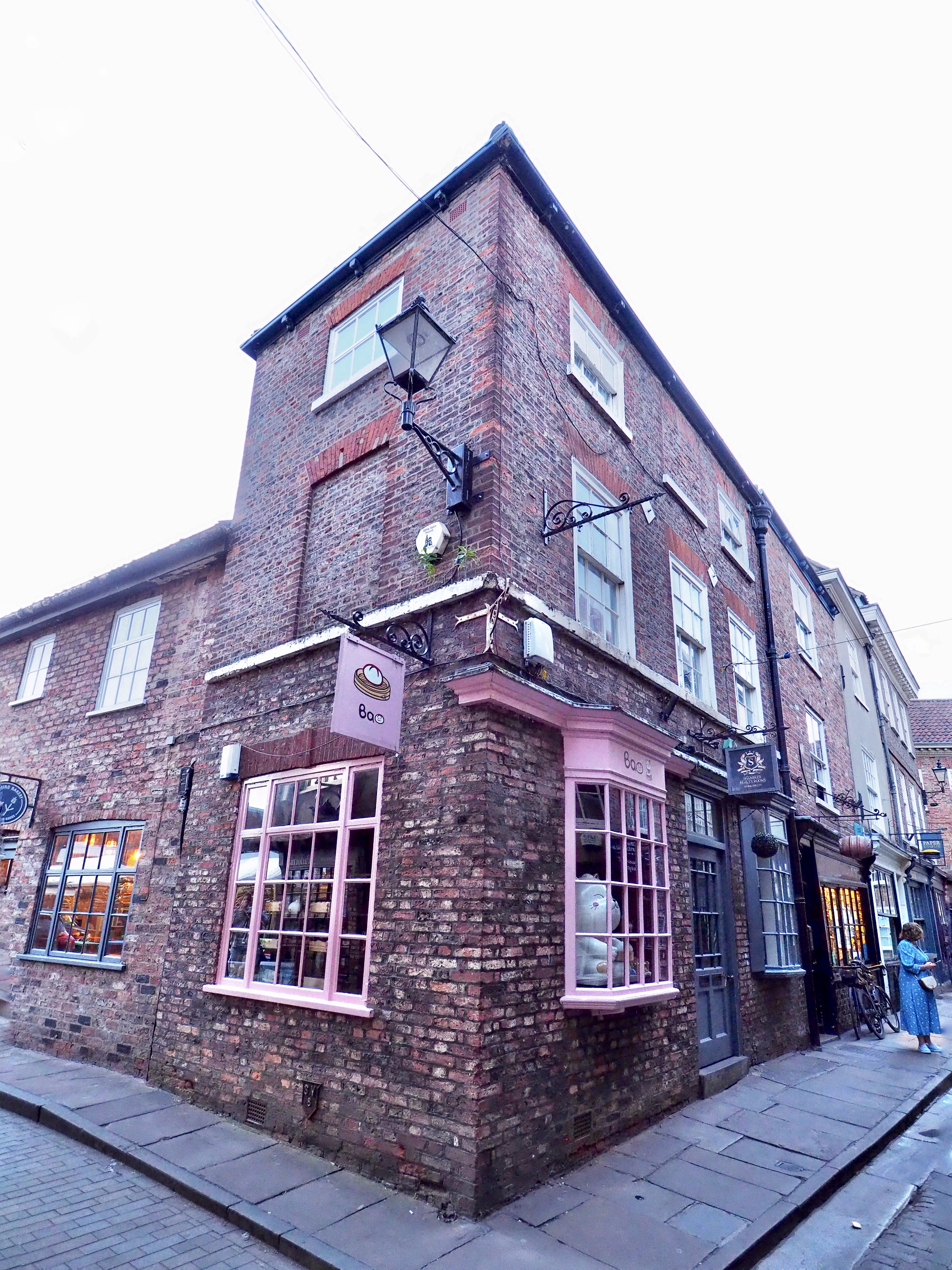
- The building in 2024
- Interactive map of the 43 The Shambles area

General information
- Location: The Shambles, York, England
- Coordinates: 53°57′35″N 1°04′49″W
- Completed: Late 18th century
- Renovated: 20th century (remodelled)

Technical details
- Floor count: 3

Design and construction
- Designations

Listed Building – Grade II
- Official name: 43, Shambles
- Designated: 14 June 1954
- Reference no.: 1256658

43 The Shambles is a historic building on The Shambles in York, England. Grade II listed, part of the structure dates to the late 18th century, with a remodelling occurring in the 20th century.

== Architecture ==
The building is constructed in orange‑buff brick with timber guttering and a hipped pantile roof.

The front has three storeys and three windows. The entrance is a margin‑glazed, panelled door with an overlight, flanked by later small‑pane canted bays beneath a continuous cornice. First‑floor windows are 12‑pane sashes on a painted sill band; the second floor has short six‑pane sashes, with the centre one blocked, all set on painted sills and flat brick heads. A fluted inverted‑bell rainwater head, dated 1775 and initialled "PA SP TY", sits to the left. A narrow raised brick band marks the second floor.

On the left return, a three‑part small‑pane shop window sits under a keyed flat arch. Above it is a blocked first‑floor opening on the continued sill band, and a later six‑pane sash with its own sill and arch on the second floor.

== See also ==
- Listed buildings in York (within the city walls, northern part)
