= 20 The Shambles =

Listed building in York, England

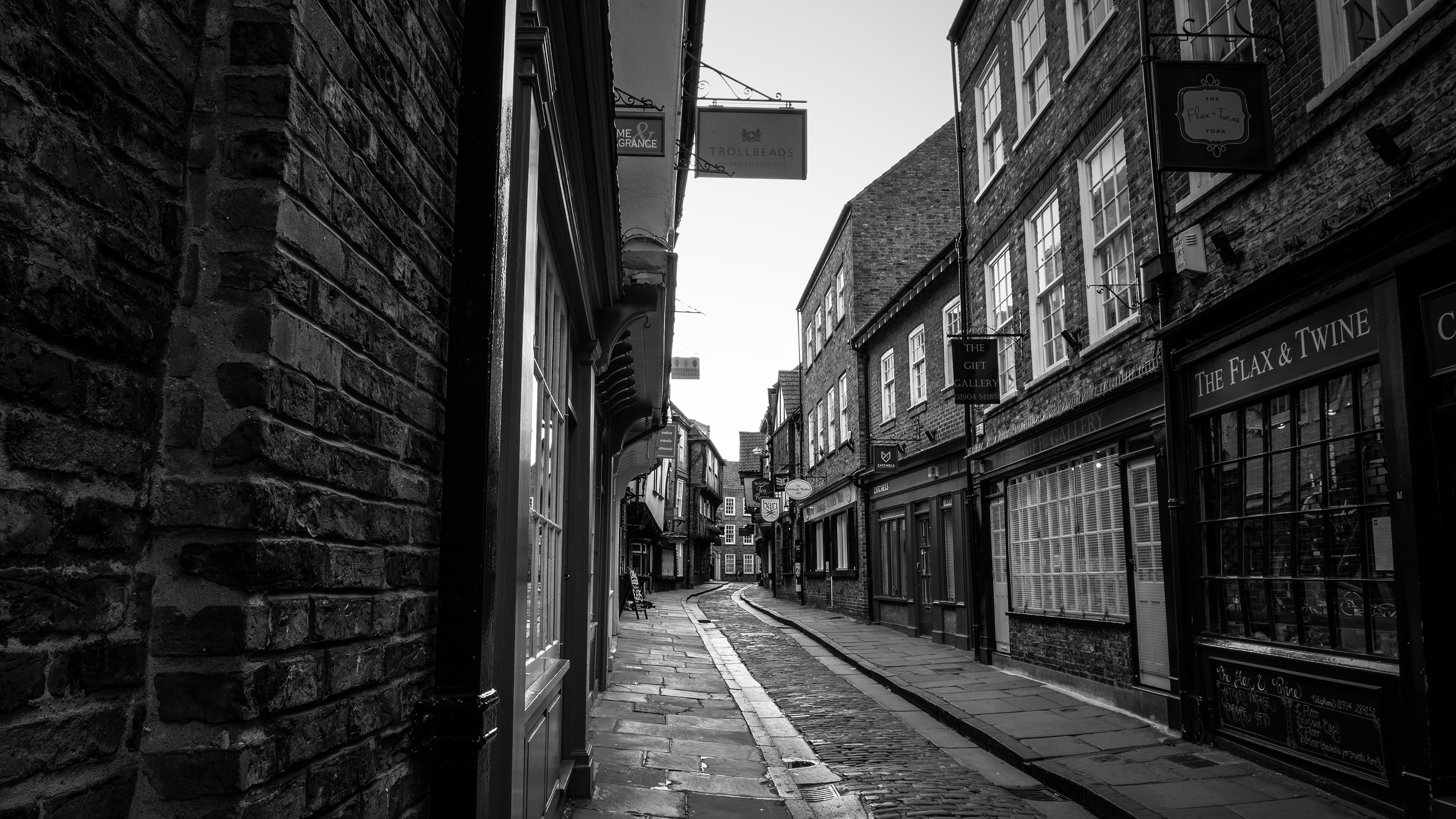
- No. 20 is on the right in this 2016 image
- Interactive map of the 20 The Shambles area

General information
- Location: The Shambles, York, England
- Coordinates: 53°57′33″N 1°04′47″W
- Completed: Early 18th century
- Renovated: 19th and 20th centuries (altered)

Design and construction
- Designations

Listed Building – Grade II
- Official name: 20, Shambles
- Designated: 14 June 1954
- Reference no.: 1256681

20 The Shambles is a historic building on The Shambles in York, England. A Grade II listed building, part of the structure dates to the early 18th century, with alterations made in both the 19th and 20th centuries.

As of 2026, the building was occupied by Hebden Tea Experience.

== See also ==
- Listed buildings in York (within the city walls, northern part)
