= 3–5 The Shambles =

Listed building in York, England

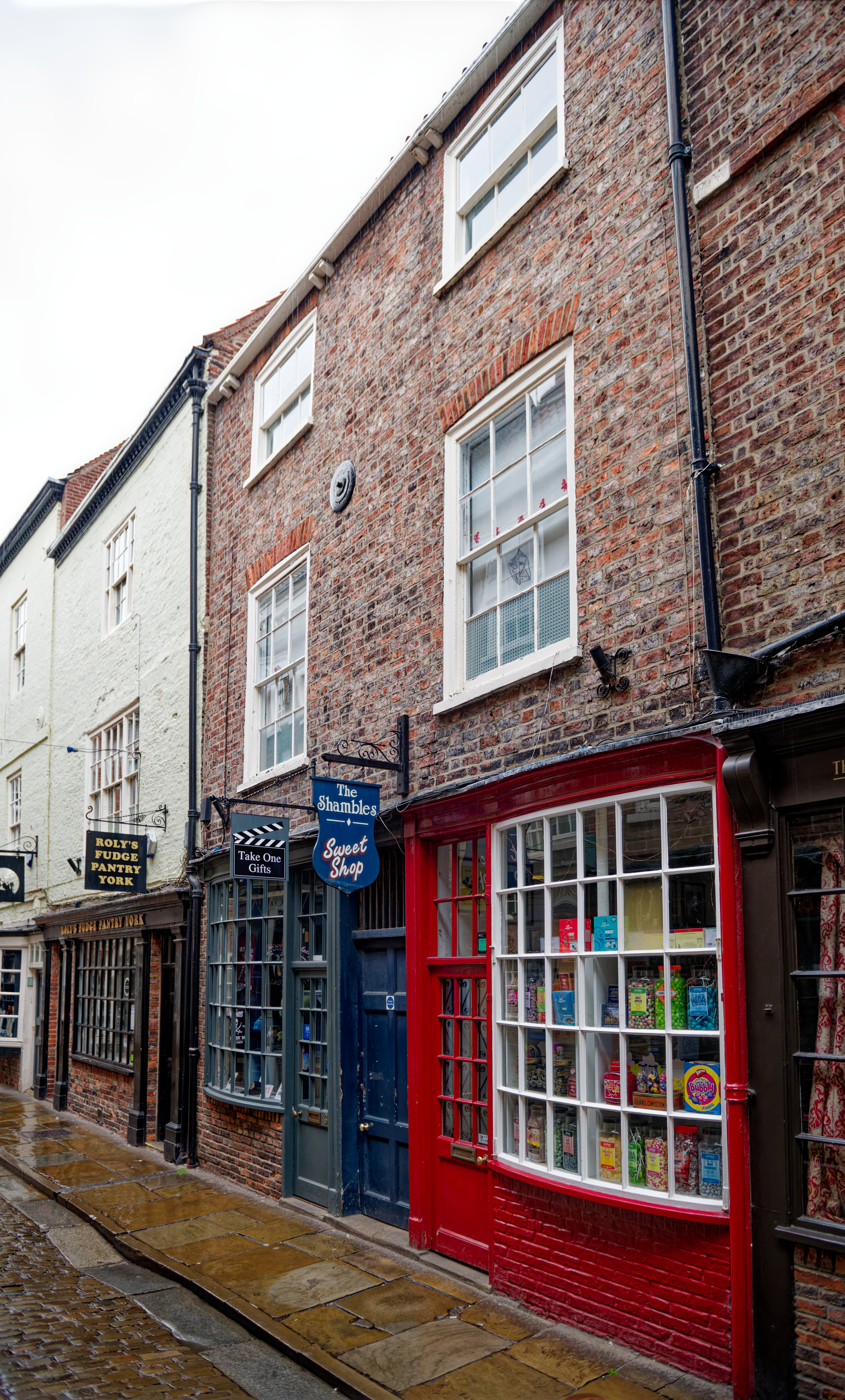
- The building in 2024
- Interactive map of the 3–5 The Shambles area

General information
- Location: The Shambles, York, England
- Coordinates: 53°57′35″N 1°04′49″W
- Completed: Early 19th century
- Renovated: c. 1970 (modernised)

Technical details
- Floor count: 3

Design and construction
- Designations

Listed Building – Grade II
- Official name: 3, 4 and 5, Shambles
- Designated: 1 July 1968
- Reference no.: 1256672

3–5 The Shambles is a historic trio of buildings on The Shambles in York, England. Grade II listed, parts of the structures date to the early 19th century.

One of the buildings formerly served as the Shoulder of Mutton public house.

Nos. 1 to 5 were modernised in 1970–71, the result of which created a series of individual businesses, with a single suite above for office space.

As of 2018, the buildings were occupied by Take One Gifts and The Shambles Sweet Shop.

== Architecture ==
The front is built in orange‑grey brick with a timber shopfront and guttering, and a pantile roof above.

The elevation has three storeys and two window bays. The shopfronts are set between sunk‑panel pilasters with a moulded cornice and angle‑blocked frieze, and include small‑pane bow windows and part‑glazed doors with tall six‑pane overlights. A central door of six sunk panels sits beneath a grilled overlight. Upper floors have 12‑pane sashes on the first floor and short six‑pane sashes above, all with painted sills and shallow cambered brick heads. A box gutter on paired brackets runs along the eaves.

== See also ==
- Listed buildings in York (within the city walls, northern part)
