= 40 The Shambles =

Listed building in York, England

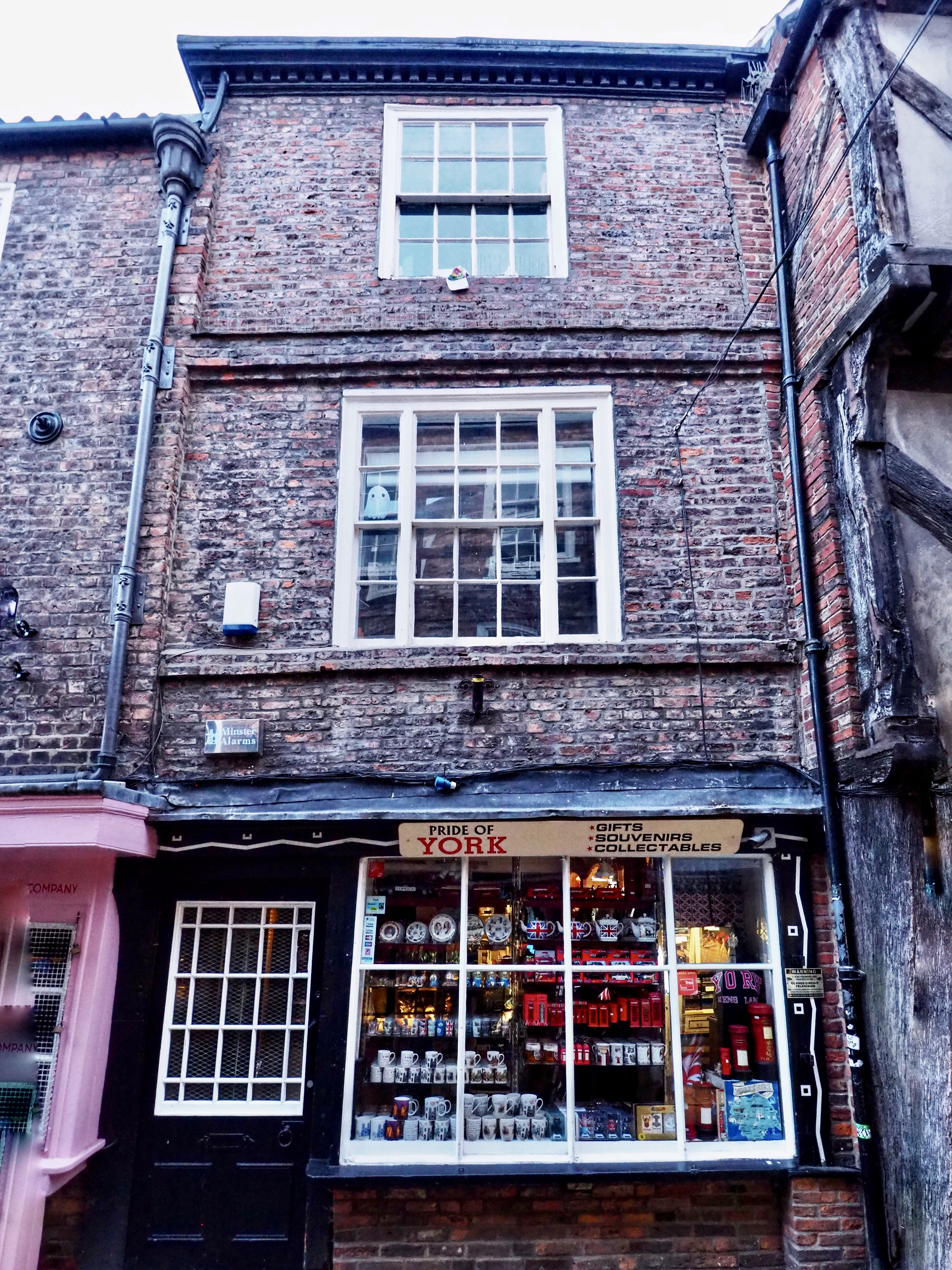
- The building in 2024
- Interactive map of the 40 The Shambles area

General information
- Location: The Shambles, York, England
- Coordinates: 53°57′34″N 1°04′49″W
- Completed: Early 18th century
- Renovated: Early 19th century (altered); Mid-19th century (shopfront)

Design and construction
- Designations

Listed Building – Grade II
- Official name: 40, Shambles
- Designated: 14 June 1954
- Reference no.: 1256645

40 The Shambles is a historic building on The Shambles in York, England. Grade II listed, part of the structure dates to the early 18th century, with an alteration and shopfront added in the early and mid-19th century.

== Architecture ==
The front is in orange‑red brick with a simple timber cornice, and a pantile roof that slopes towards the street with a brick chimney. It has three storeys and a single window bay. The shop entrance has a margin‑glazed, panelled door and an eight‑pane window under a plain cornice. Above are a wide three‑part sash on the first floor and a 16‑pane sash on the second, each set above narrow brick bands. The eaves have a moulded cornice with a decorative rainwater head.

The rear has a three‑storey gable wall with 16‑pane sashes on the lower floors and a small Yorkshire sash above, all set beneath shallow brick arches.

=== Interior ===
Inside, the ground floor front room keeps its shaped timber cornice above the shop window and door. On the first floor, the enclosed staircase to the second floor remains, with turned balusters, square newels and a plain handrail. A simple two‑panel plank door with pegged moulding leads to the rear room. The front room has a cast‑iron fireplace in a shaped surround.

The second‑floor front room has a six‑panel door, and its fireplace is concealed behind shelving, with a plank cupboard door to the right.

== See also ==
- Listed buildings in York (within the city walls, northern part)
