= 21 The Shambles =

Listed building in York, England

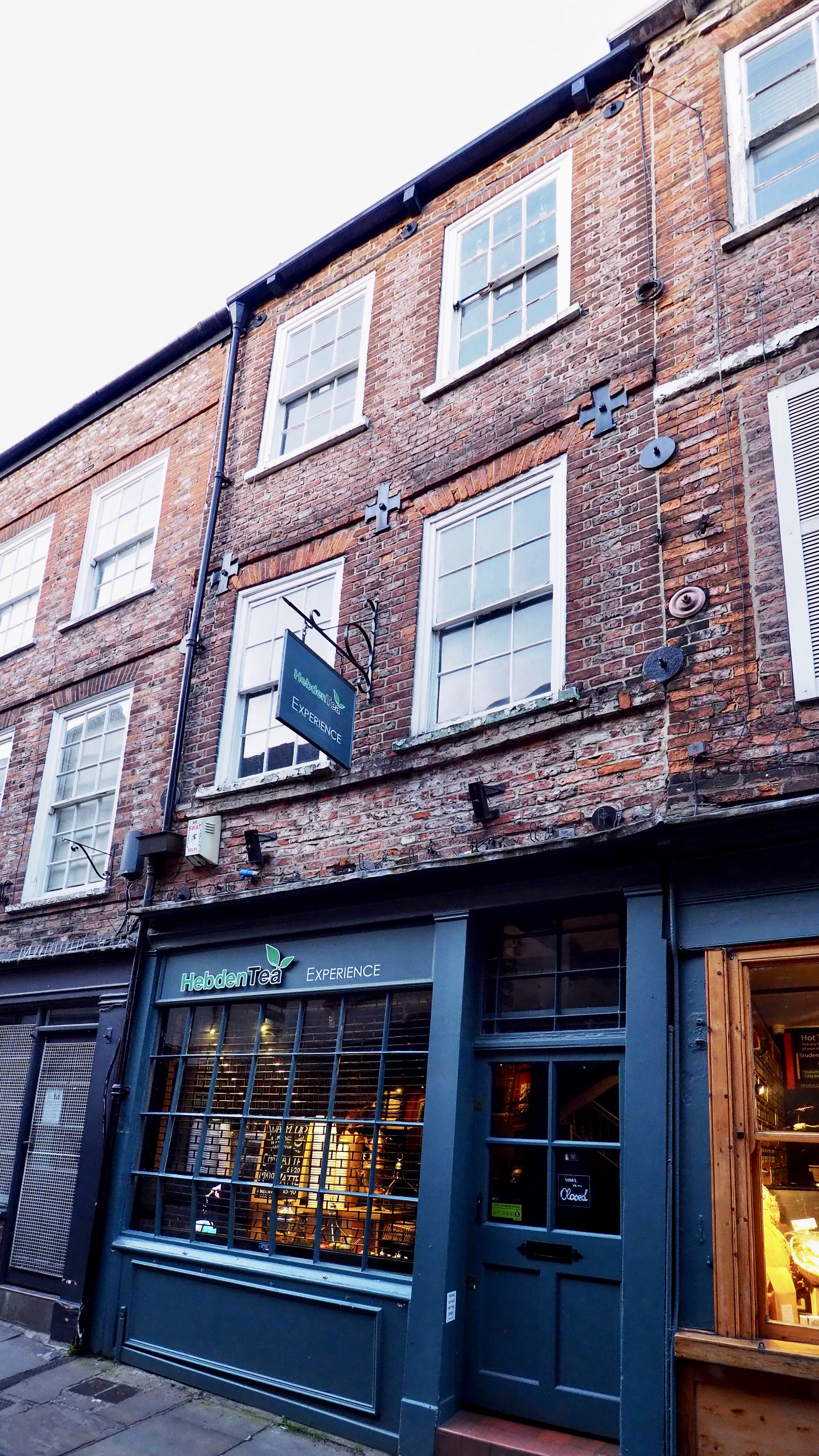
- The building in 2024
- Interactive map of the 21 The Shambles area

General information
- Location: The Shambles, York, England
- Coordinates: 53°57′33″N 1°04′47″W
- Completed: Early 18th century
- Renovated: 19th century (altered)

Design and construction
- Designations

Listed Building – Grade II
- Official name: 21, Shambles
- Designated: 14 June 1954
- Reference no.: 1256682

21 The Shambles is a historic building on The Shambles in York, England. A Grade II listed building, part of the structure dates to the early 18th century, with alterations made in the 19th century.

As of 2026, the building is occupied by Hebden Tea Company.

== See also ==
- Listed buildings in York (within the city walls, northern part)
