= St Trinity House =

Listed building in York, England

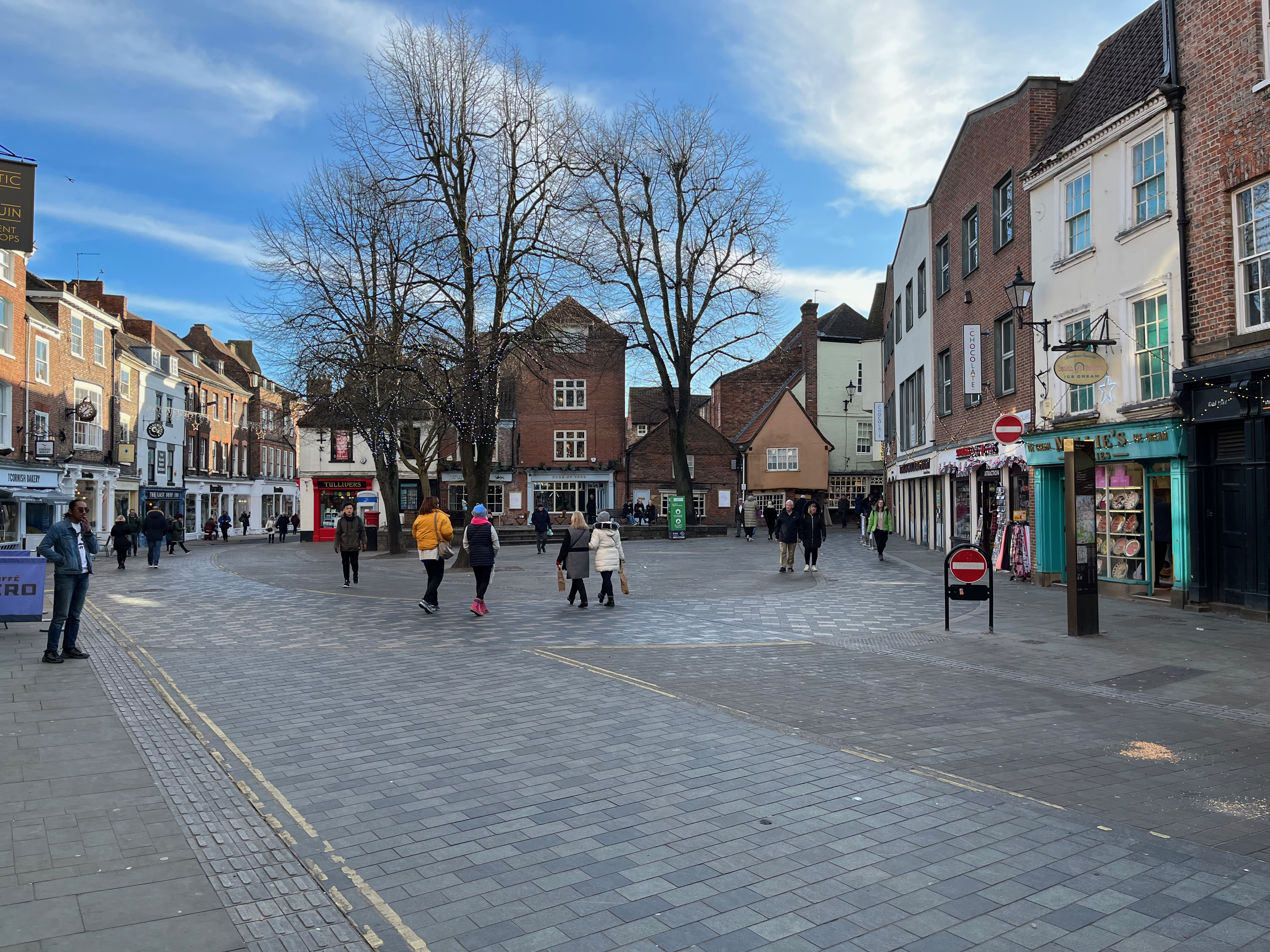
- The range is visible at the far end of this 2023 view of King's Square. Tullivers, the white building, stands at 1–2 Colliergate
- Interactive map of the St Trinity House area

General information
- Location: 3, 4 and 4A King's Square, York, England
- Coordinates: 53.959905°N 1.0800630°W
- Completed: Early 18th to 20th century

Design and construction
- Designations

Listed Building – Grade II
- Official name: St Trinity House
- Designated: 14 June 1954
- Reference no.: 1257520

St Trinity House is a historic group of four buildings in the centre of York, England. Listed at Grade II and forming the southern side of King's Square, parts of the range date from the early 18th century, with further alterations made over the following two hundred years. Their present addresses run from Nos. 3 to 4A King's Square. The Duke of York pub occupies Nos. 3 and 4; the current use of No. 4A, the oldest of the four, is not known. The only one with a rendered front, it adjoins 1 The Shambles, creating an L-shaped corner at the south-west of the square. In the early 20th century, both buildings housed G. Ackroyd Furniture Stores.

In 1430, the site contained shops known as Le Mercery and a building called Hellekeld (the dark well), thought to be a precursor to Pump Court.

Three of the buildings are 20th-century remodels of 15th-century (or earlier) structures, one of which was altered in the 17th century, while two were rebuilt in the early 18th century. The remaining building is a 20th-century structure. Each of the 15th-century buildings retains its timber framing.

The first floor of No. 4A is jettied towards Newgate and retains its dragon beam at that corner. The first building that appears to stand at the start of Newgate is actually 5 and 6 King's Court.

The buildings stood in the shadow of Holy Trinity Church, from which the range takes its named. The church occupied the north side of what was then King's Court from the 15th century until its demolition in 1937.

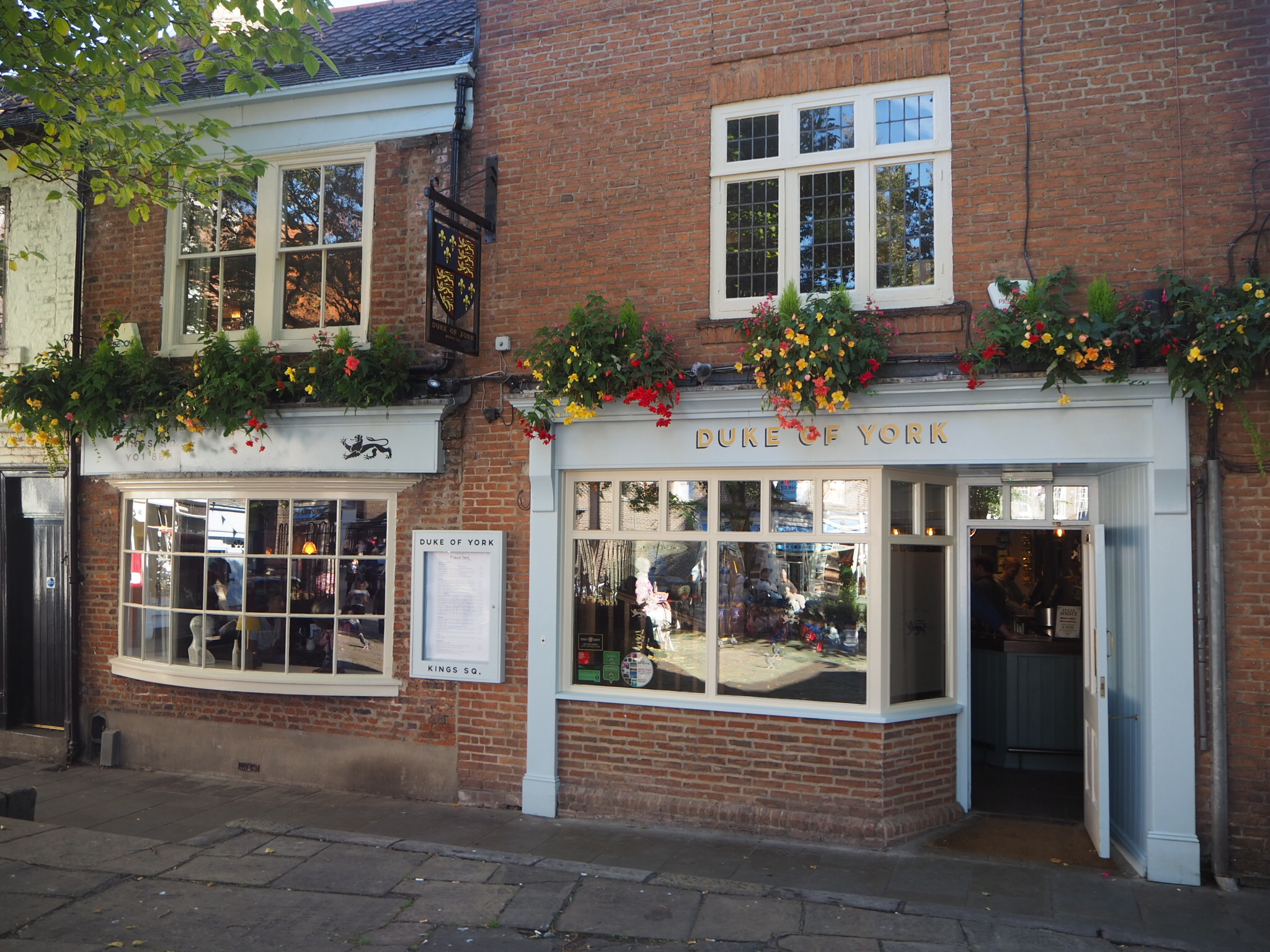
Duke of York pub

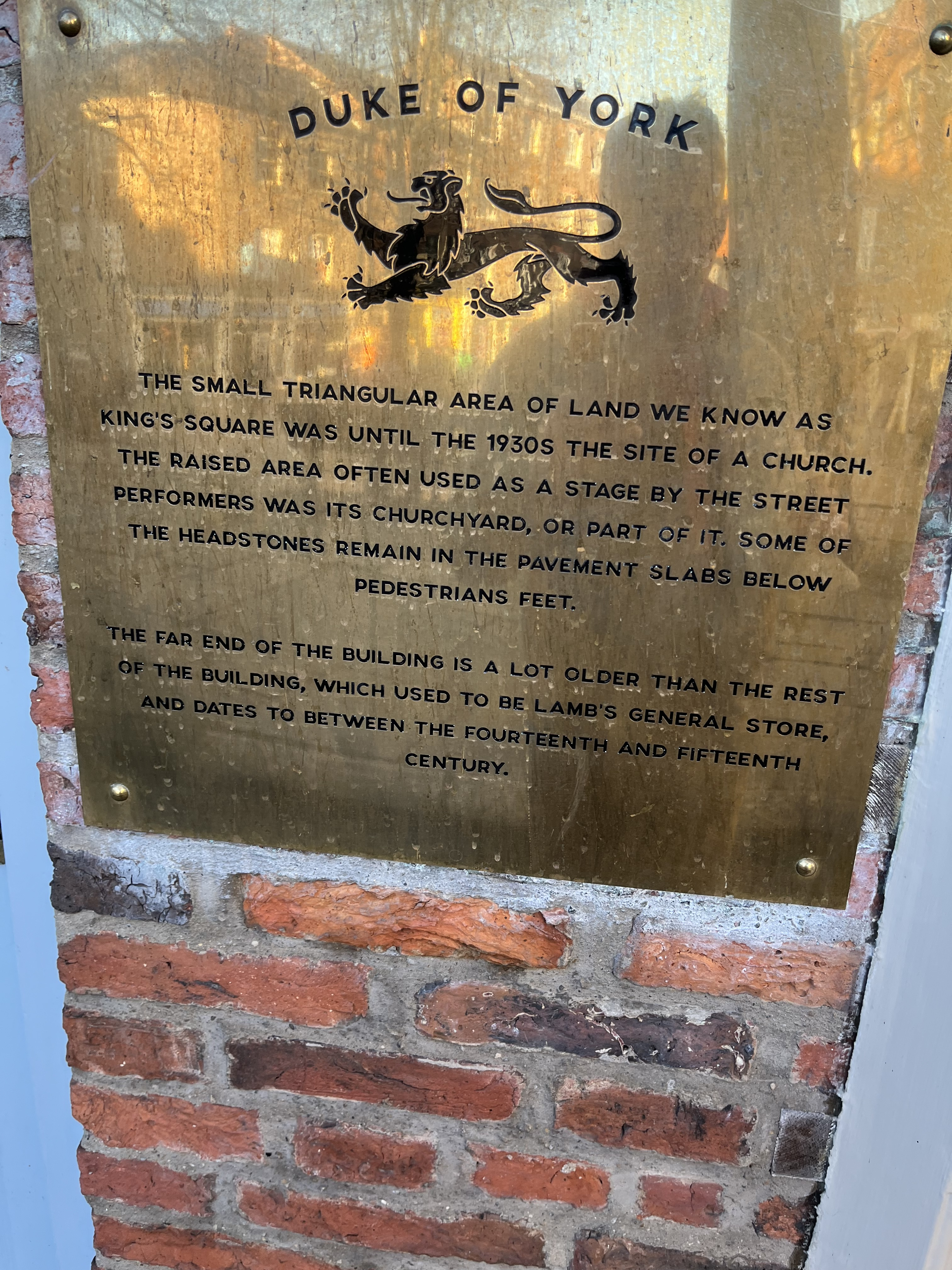
Plaque on the Duke of York sections

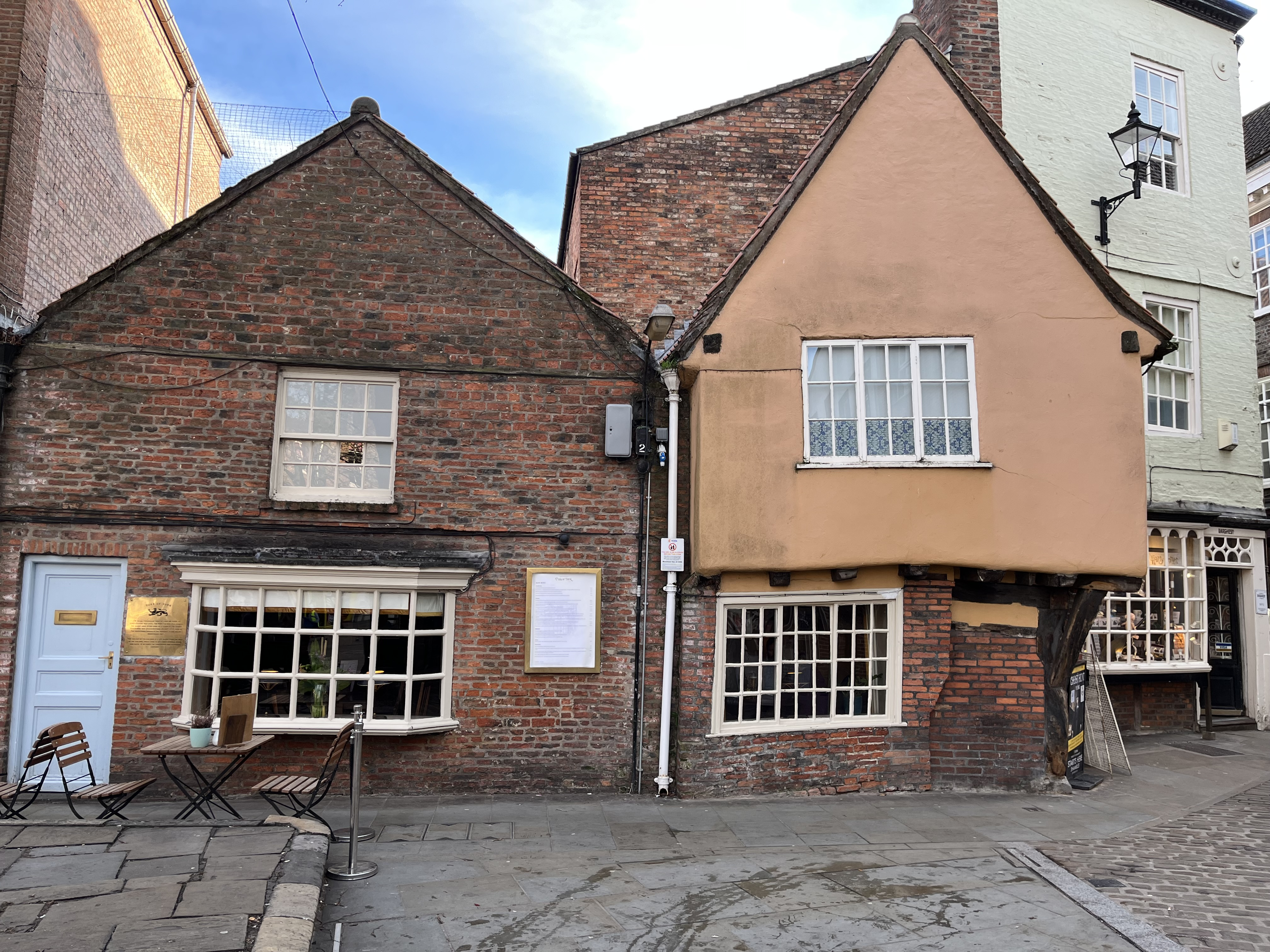
4 and 4A, the oldest parts of the range

== See also ==
- Listed buildings in York (within the city walls, northern part)
