= 1 The Shambles =

Listed building in York, England

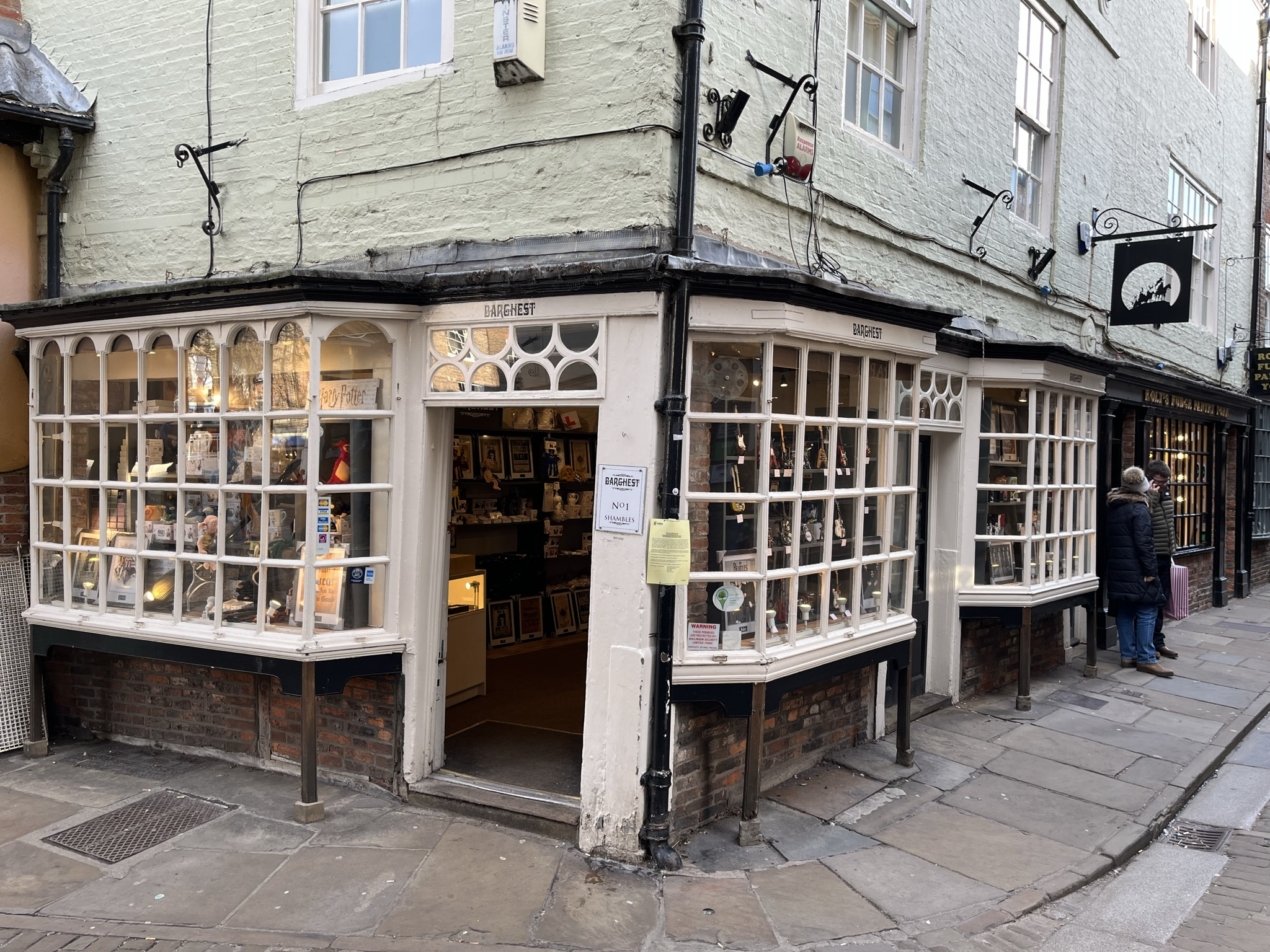
- The building in 2023
- Interactive map of the 1 The Shambles area
- Alternative names: Barghest

General information
- Location: The Shambles, York, England
- Coordinates: 53°57′35″N 1°04′49″W
- Completed: 14th century
- Renovated: 17th and 18th centuries

Technical details
- Floor count: 2 / 3

Design and construction
- Designations

Listed Building – Grade II
- Official name: 1, Shambles
- Designated: 14 June 1954
- Reference no.: 1256670

1 The Shambles (also known as Barghest) is a historic building in York, England. Grade II listed and standing at the corner of The Shambles and Newgate, part of the building dates to the 14th century, but it was renovated in the 17th and 18th centuries. Its Newgate façade faces King's Square, and this has the functioning doorway to the building. It is this side of the building, which is two storeys, that dates to the 14th century. It adjoins 4A King's Square to form an L-shape. The western side is three storeys, dating to the second half of the 18th century.

Nos. 1 to 5 were modernised in 1970–71, the result of which created a series of individual businesses, with a single suite above for office space.

== History ==
In 1840, the building was occupied by William Brodie's butchers.

== Composition ==
The building is painted brick in Flemish bond. Its shopfront is timber-framed. It has a hipped pantile roof. Both of the building's doors have decorative transoms. The building's windows are small-paned canted bays with moulded cornices.

== See also ==
- Listed buildings in York (within the city walls, northern part)
