= Holy Trinity Church, York =

Holy Trinity Church, York may refer to:

- Holy Trinity Church, Goodramgate, York, a church in York, England
- Holy Trinity Church, Heworth, York, church in York, England
- Holy Trinity Church, King's Court, a church in York, England
- Holy Trinity Church, Micklegate, York, a church in York, England
- Holy Trinity Church, York, Western Australia, a church in York, Australia

== See also ==
- Holy Trinity Church (disambiguation), which lists several churches in New York City and Yorkshire
