= 1 Little Shambles =

Listed building in York, England

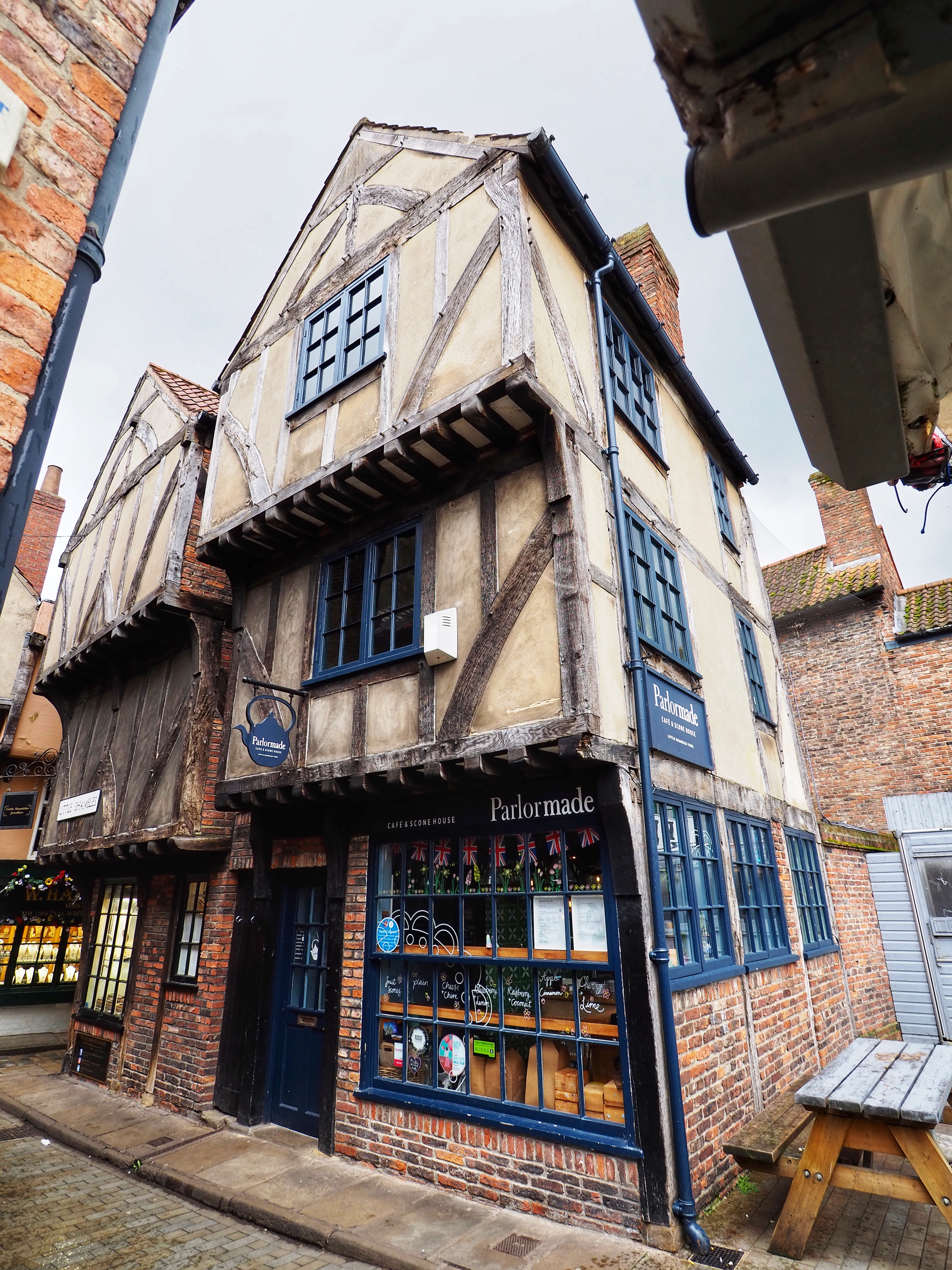
- The building in 2024
- Interactive map of the 1 Little Shambles area

General information
- Location: Little Shambles, York, England
- Coordinates: 53.95955318°N 1.08024227°W
- Completed: 15th century
- Renovated: c. 1950 (restored)

Design and construction
- Designations

Listed Building – Grade II
- Official name: 1, Little Shambles
- Designated: 14 June 1954
- Reference no.: 1257477

1 Little Shambles is a historic building in the city of York, England. A Grade II listed building, it adjoins the rear of 41–42 Shambles and faces Shambles Market.

A former house, dating to the 15th century, it was restored around 1950. It is timber-framed, with the ground floor walls made of orange-red brick in English garden-wall bond. Its upper floors are rendered. It has a pantile roof with a brick chimney stack.

There are two doors on the Little Shambles elevation: one for the ground floor and one for the upper floors. As of 2023, the building is occupied by Parlormade Café and Scone House.

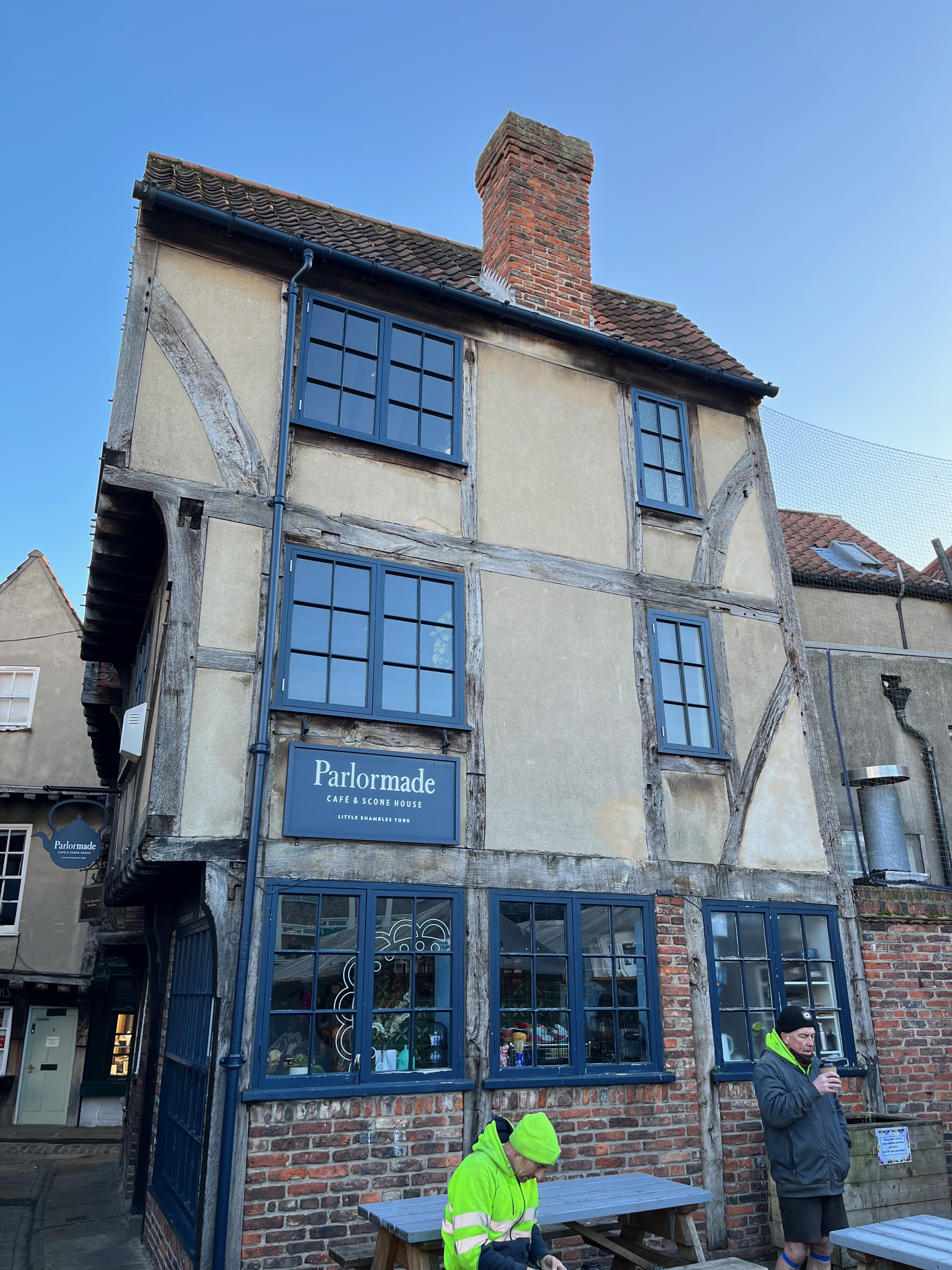
Viewed from Shambles Market

== See also ==
- Listed buildings in York (within the city walls, northern part)
