= 6 King's Square =

Listed building in York, England

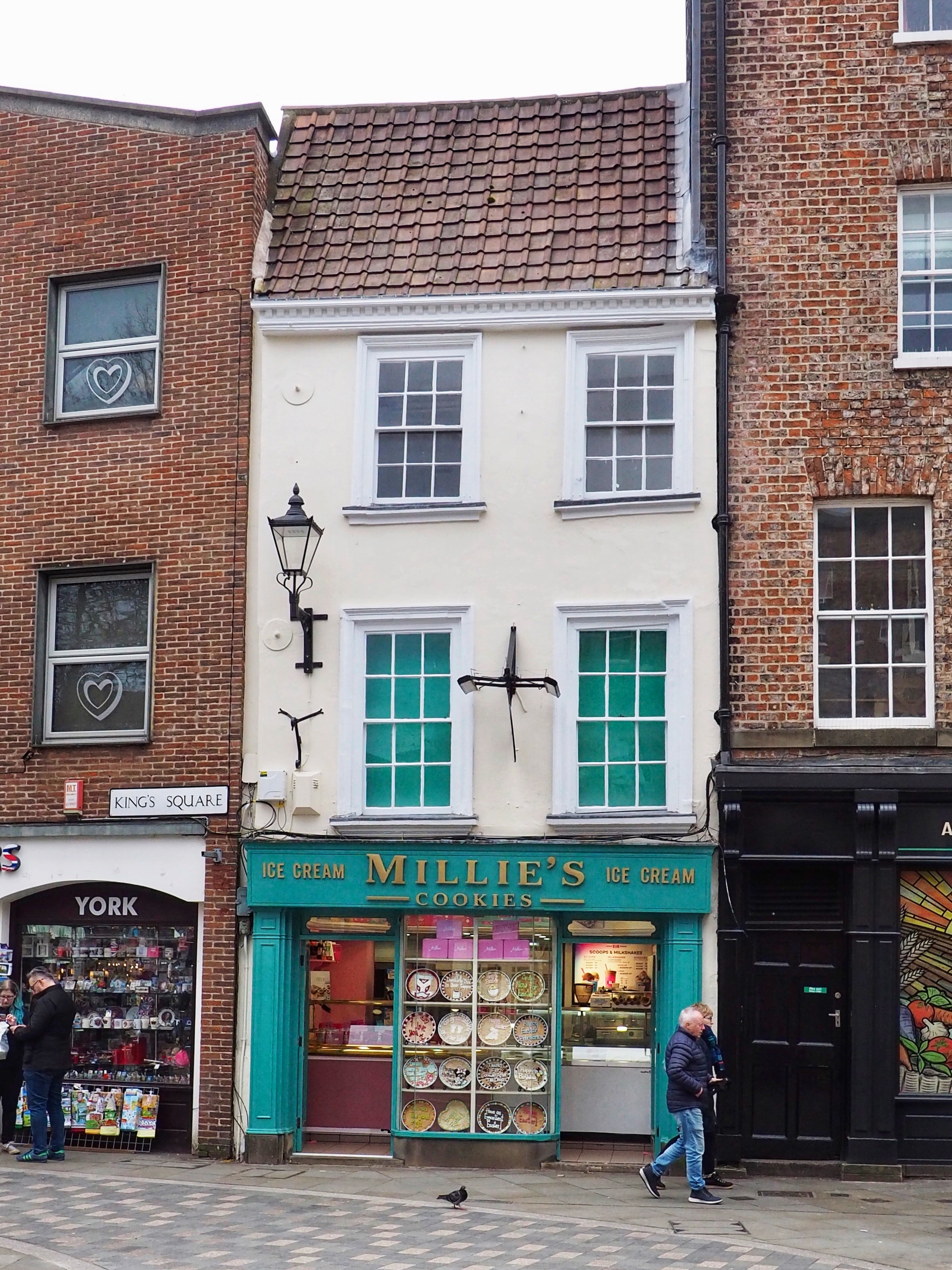
- The building in 2024
- Interactive map of the 6 King's Square area
- Former names: 5 King's Square

General information
- Location: King's Square, York, England
- Coordinates: 53.960147°N 1.08038°W
- Completed: 1587 (439 years ago)
- Renovated: Mid-18th century (rebuilt and extended); 20th century (altered and shopfront)
- Client: Richard Hutton

Listed Building – Grade II
- Official name: 6, Kings Square
- Designated: 24 June 1983
- Reference no.: 1257521

6 King's Square is a historic building in the city centre of York, England. Dating to 1587, and built for Richard Hutton, it is now Grade II listed. At the time of the building's listing by Historic England in 1983, its address was 5 King's Square. It became No. 6 in 1997.

The building is located on the western side of King's Square, and formerly faced Holy Trinity Church, up until the church's demolition in 1937. It is adjoined on the right by the 19th-century 12 and 12A Church Street.

In the first half the 20th century, the building was home to the Porter Vaults, a public house owned by the Leeds-based Tetley's Brewery.

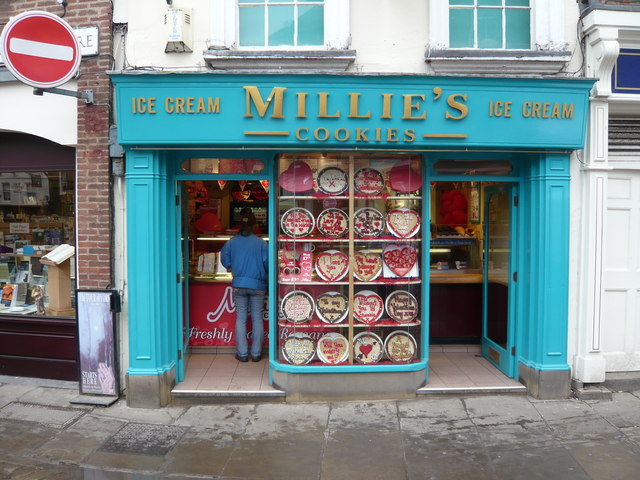
Entrance detail

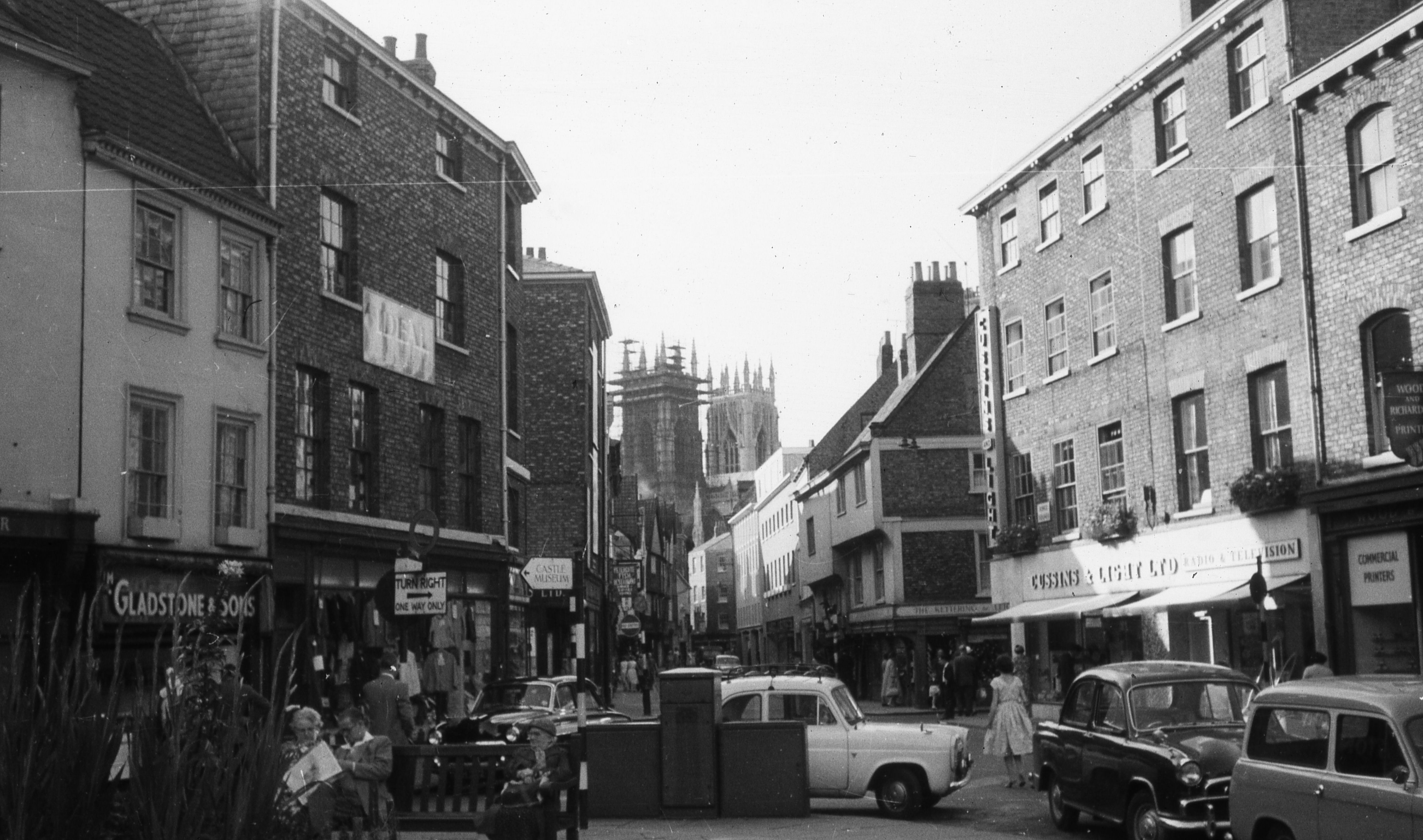
The building is on the left in this 1960s view to the north

== See also ==
- Listed buildings in York (within the city walls, northern part)
