= 41–42 The Shambles =

Listed building in York, England

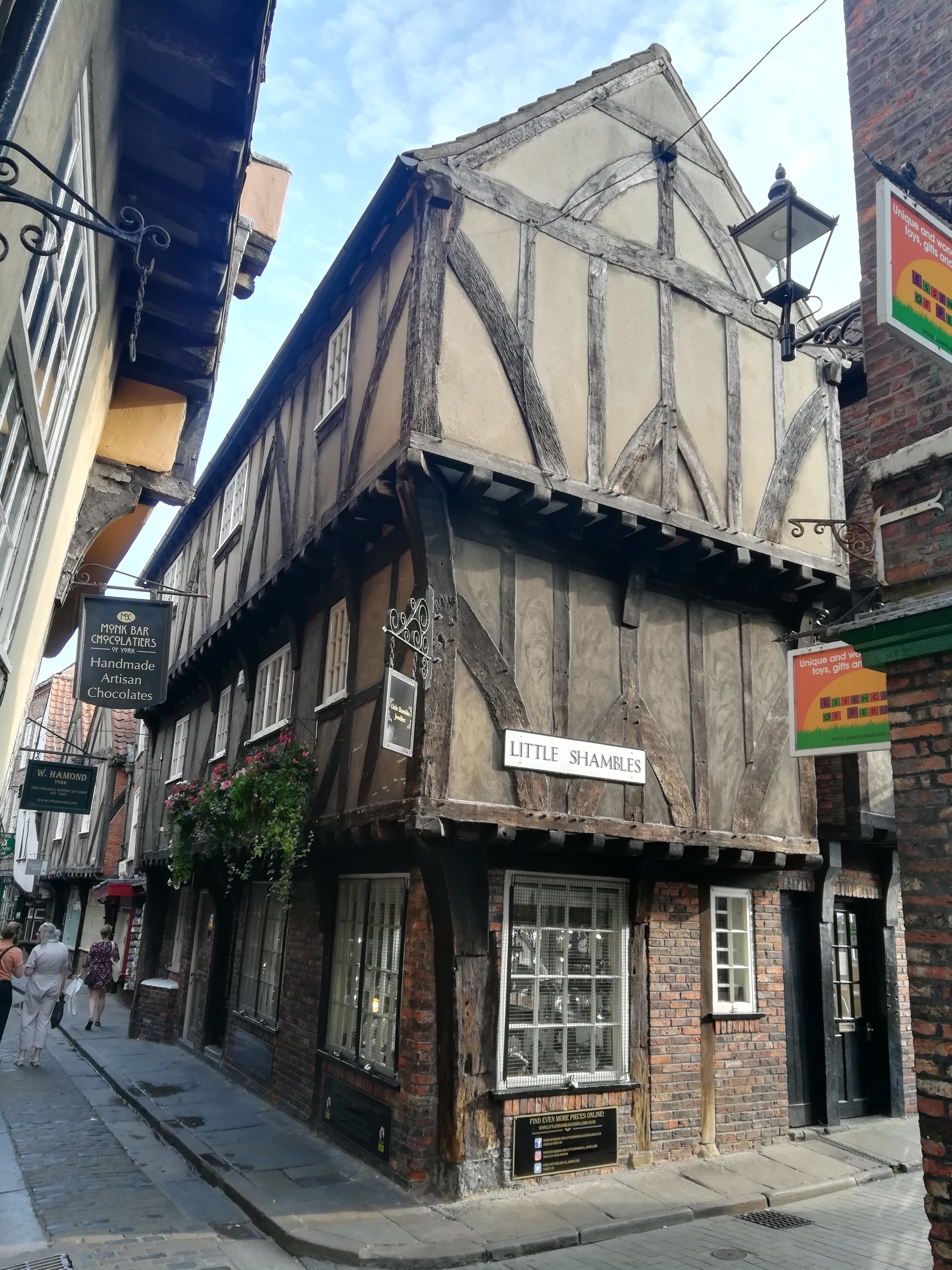
- The building in 2018
- Interactive map of the 41–42 The Shambles area

General information
- Location: 41–42 The Shambles, York, England
- Coordinates: 53°57′34″N 1°04′49″W
- Completed: Late 15th century
- Renovated: c. 1950 (restored)

Technical details
- Floor count: 3

Design and construction
- Designations

Listed Building – Grade II
- Official name: 41 and 42, Shambles
- Designated: 14 June 1954
- Reference no.: 1256657

41 and 42 The Shambles is a historic building in York, England.

The building was constructed in the late 15th century, as a three-storey timber-framed building on The Shambles. The upper storeys are jettied on both the Shambles and Little Shambles fronts. The ground floor was later rebuilt in brick, and the upper floors are rendered. Inside, the timber frame survives intact, including a crown post roof.

The building, which is adjoined to the rear by 1 Little Shambles, was restored in 1950, and continues to serve as a shop and workshop. It was Grade II* listed in 1954.

== See also ==
- Grade II* listed buildings in the City of York
- Listed buildings in York (within the city walls, northern part)
