= 2 Jubbergate =

Listed building in York, England

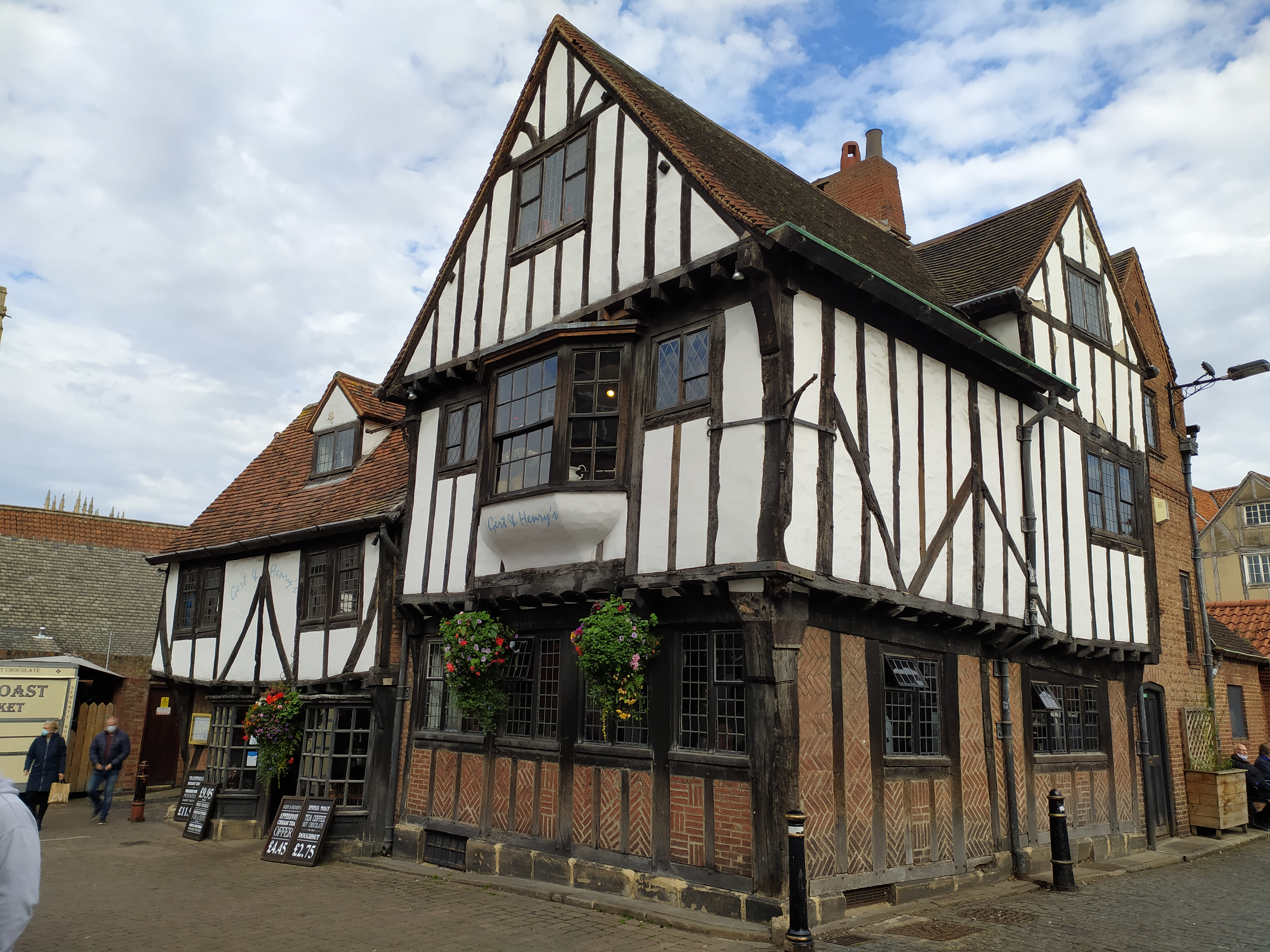
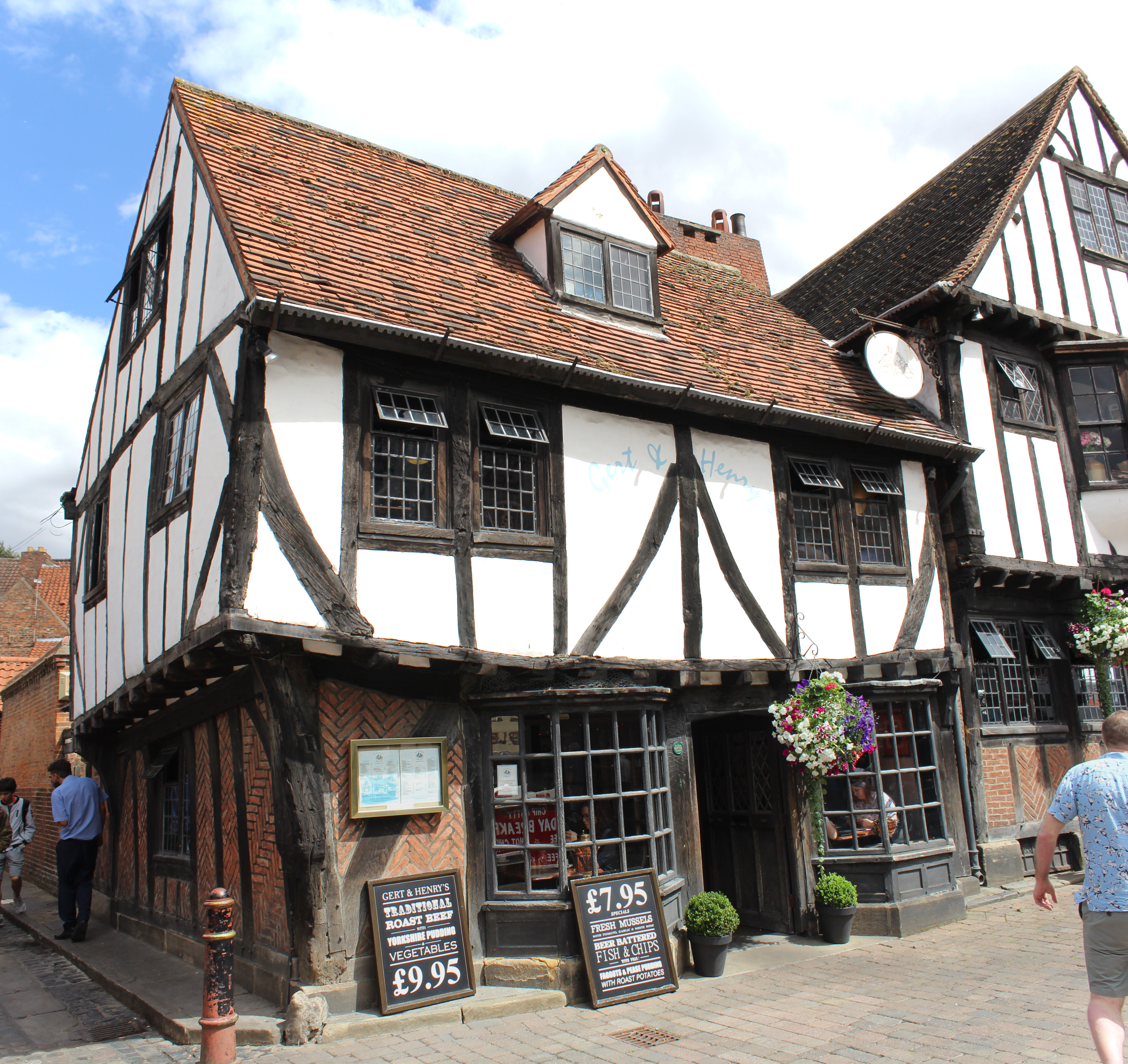
- 2 Jubbergate, seen from the south The 14th-century wing of the building

- Location within York City Centre

General information
- Location: Jubbergate, York, England
- Coordinates: 53.9594°N 1.0808°W
- Years built: 14th and early 17th centuries
- Renovated: 1928

Technical details
- Material: Timber framed
- Floor count: 2 / 3

Design and construction
- Designations

Listed Building – Grade II*
- Official name: 2, Jubbergate
- Designated: 14 June 1954
- Reference no.: 1257555

2 Jubbergate, also known as 4 Jubbergate, is a Grade II* listed building in the city centre of York, England.

The older part of the building was constructed in the 14th century, at the end of Jubbergate, where it met Newgate and Little Shambles. This part is of two bays, timber framed, with a jettied upper floor, and brick infill on the ground floor. In the early 17th century, another timber framed building was constructed next to it, in two parts: a two bay, two-storey section with an original attic and cellar, and a smaller three-storey section, the two perhaps having been built a few years apart. Over time, the two have become interconnected and are now a single property. Internally, the 17th-century section has an original chimney with a fireplace in the attic, and there is a plaster cornice in one first floor room which dates from the 18th century.

By 1830, the building was in commercial use, as the Taylor, Cook & Co chemists and art shop. With the creation of nearby Parliament Street, it became a prime location for its new market, and by the 1870s it was a hatters' shop. In 1928, the building was restored by Brierley and Rutherford. They rebuilt the north-east wall of the 14th-century wing, inserted a new staircase in the 17th-century wing and built a brick extension to its rear, replaced the windows, and renewed some of the timber.

Following the reconstruction, the building served for many years as the White Rose Cafe. It was Grade II* listed in 1954, and in 1957, the York Conservation Trust purchased the freehold. As part of the creation of the Shambles Market, the neighbouring buildings were demolished, and it is now freestanding, almost surrounded by the market. It later became Gert and Henry's restaurant.

== See also ==
- Grade II* listed buildings in the City of York
- Listed buildings in York (within the city walls, northern part)
