= Newgate Market =

Newgate Market can refer to:

- A market formerly held on Newgate, in London
- The former name of Shambles Market, in York
