= 12 and 12A Church Street =

Listed building in York, England

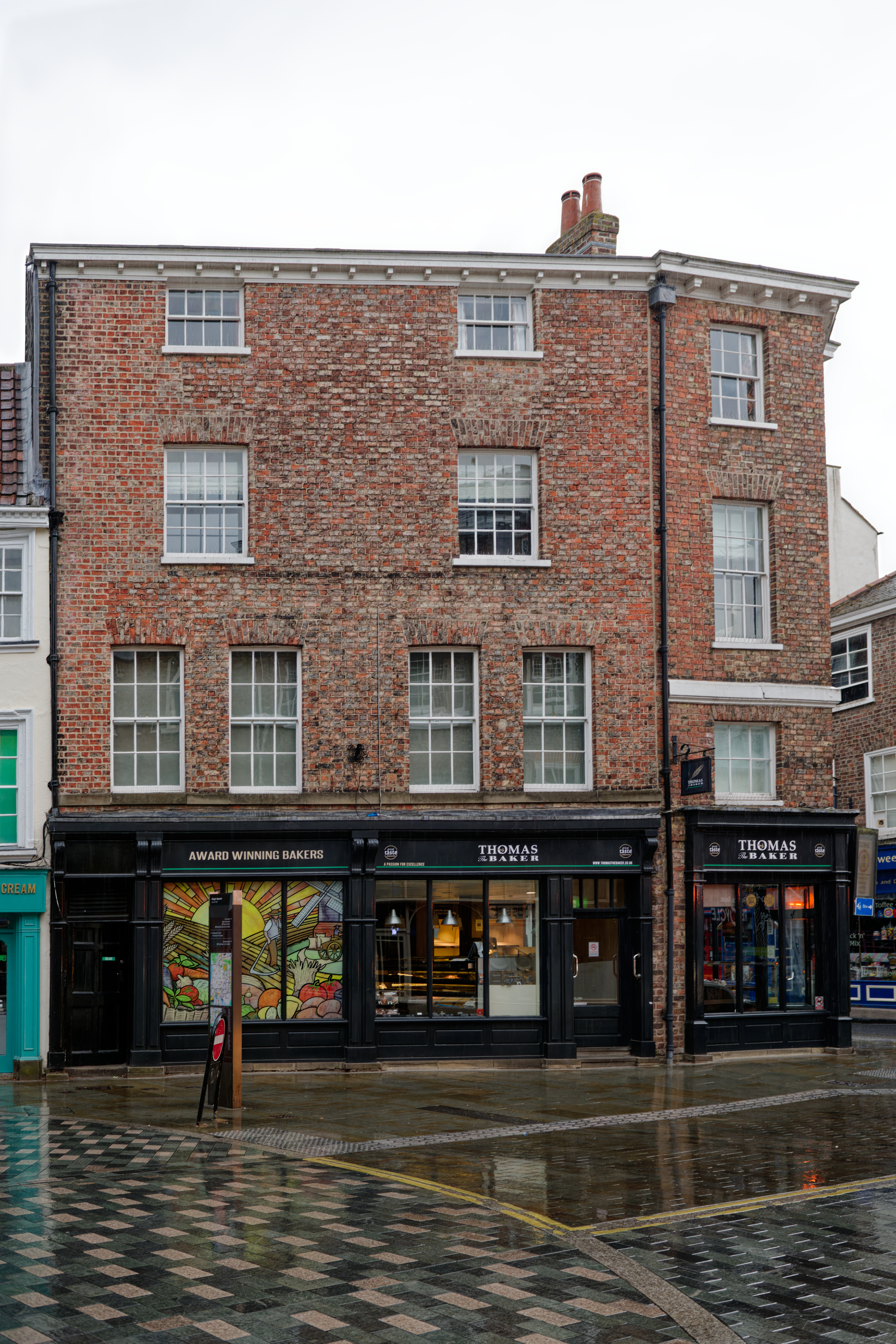
- The King's Square elevation in 2024
- Interactive map of the 12 and 12A Church Street area

General information
- Location: Church Street, York, England
- Coordinates: 53.960255°N 1.080504°W
- Completed: 1836 (190 years ago); 1839 (187 years ago)
- Renovated: 20th century (altered and shopfronts)

Listed Building – Grade II
- Official name: 12 and 12A, Church Street
- Designated: 24 June 1983
- Reference no.: 1259286

12 and 12A Church Street is a historic pair of buildings in the city centre of York, England. Dating from 1836 and 1839, and standing at the corner of Church Street and King's Square, they became Grade II listed buildings in 1983. The King's Square elevation adjoins the 16th-century 6 King's Square.

In the 20th century, an iron railing surrounded the tall first-floor window on one of the two fronts at the building's corner.

== Architecture ==
The front is built in orange‑grey mottled brick with moulded timber cornices and slate roofs, hipped over the corner bay, with brick chimneys. The building has two principal elevations on a corner plot.

The Church Street front has three storeys plus a mezzanine, arranged in six bays, with one bay angled at the corner. The shopfront to No. 12, entered from King's Square, wraps around the corner and includes a six‑panel upper‑floor door. No. 12A has a part‑glazed door between plate‑glass windows set above beaded panel bases. The mezzanine has a lunette window in a moulded arch over No. 12A; other openings are short six‑pane fixed lights, some replaced with small‑pane casements. The first and second floors have 12‑pane sashes with slender glazing bars, taller on the first floor, with one inserted casement and one blocked window at the left of the second floor. All have narrow painted sills and flat brick heads.

The recessed corner bay has a two‑light casement at mezzanine level, a widened first‑floor opening with a two‑by‑five‑pane casement, and an unaltered second‑floor window. The windows in the King's Square bay remain unchanged. A moulded band runs above the mezzanine, and the eaves have a moulded cornice on shaped brackets.

On the King's Square front, one bay continues from the Church Street elevation, followed by the main four‑storey, four‑bay front. A six‑panel passage door stands at the left of the shopfront. First‑floor windows are tall 12‑pane sashes on a painted sill band. The second floor has two 16‑pane sashes and two short eight‑pane sashes, all with painted stone sills and flat brick heads. The eaves are finished with a moulded modillion cornice.

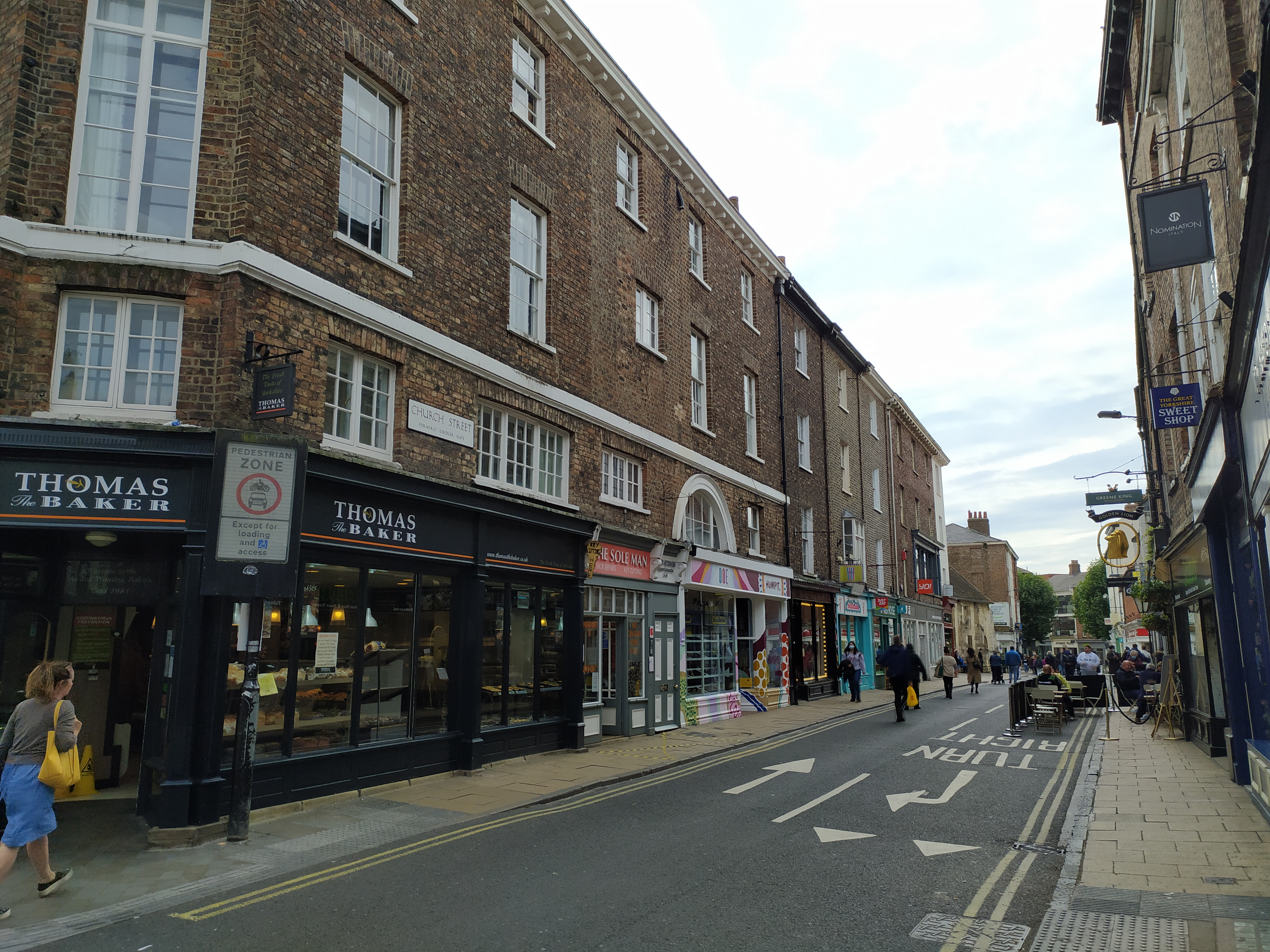
Church Street elevation (2020)

== See also ==
- Listed buildings in York (within the city walls, northern part)
