= 6 Newgate =

Listed building in York, England

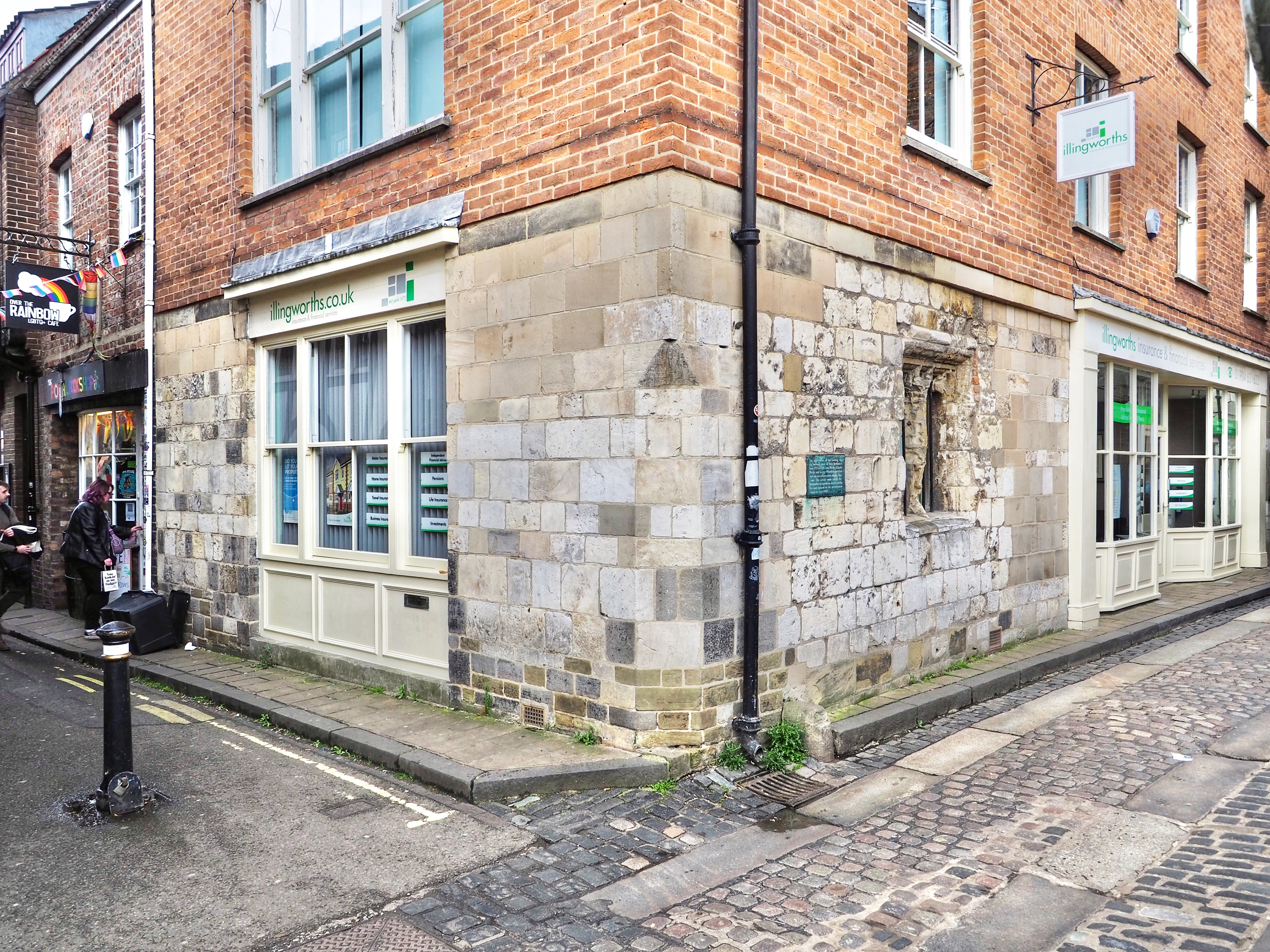
- The building in 2023
- Interactive map of the 6 Newgate area

General information
- Location: Newgate, York, England
- Coordinates: 53°57′35″N 1°04′50″W
- Year built: 14th century
- Renovated: c. 1880 (extensively rebuilt); 1963 (rebuilt and restored)

Design and construction
- Designations

Listed Building – Grade II
- Official name: 6, Newgate
- Designated: 14 June 1954
- Reference no.: 1257059

6 Newgate is a historic building in the city centre of York, England.

A large house with a stone ground floor and a timber-framed jettied upper floor was built on the corner of Newgate and Patrick Pool in the mid-14th century. It originally extended east to Pump Court, but was later divided into two properties. In the 18th century, part of the building was used as a Methodist chapel, where John Wesley preached on three occasions. From 1813 to 1816, it was used as a school. In about 1880, the building suffered a fire, destroying the upper storey. It was replaced with two brick storeys, which were again rebuilt in 1963. During this rebuilding, part of an 11th-century cross shaft was found and moved to the Yorkshire Museum.

The building was Grade II listed in 1954. It has a ground floor of medieval limestone, and upper floors in brick, with a pantile roof. It has three storeys and is one bay wide on both its Newgate and Patrick Pool fronts. Despite its Newgate address, the entrance is on Patrick Pool. On the ground floor, facing Newgate, there is an early square-headed window with two lights, while the other windows are sashes. There is further stonework including a stone bracket in a passageway to Pump Court.

== See also ==
- Listed buildings in York (within the city walls, northern part)
