= Little Shambles =

Street in York, England

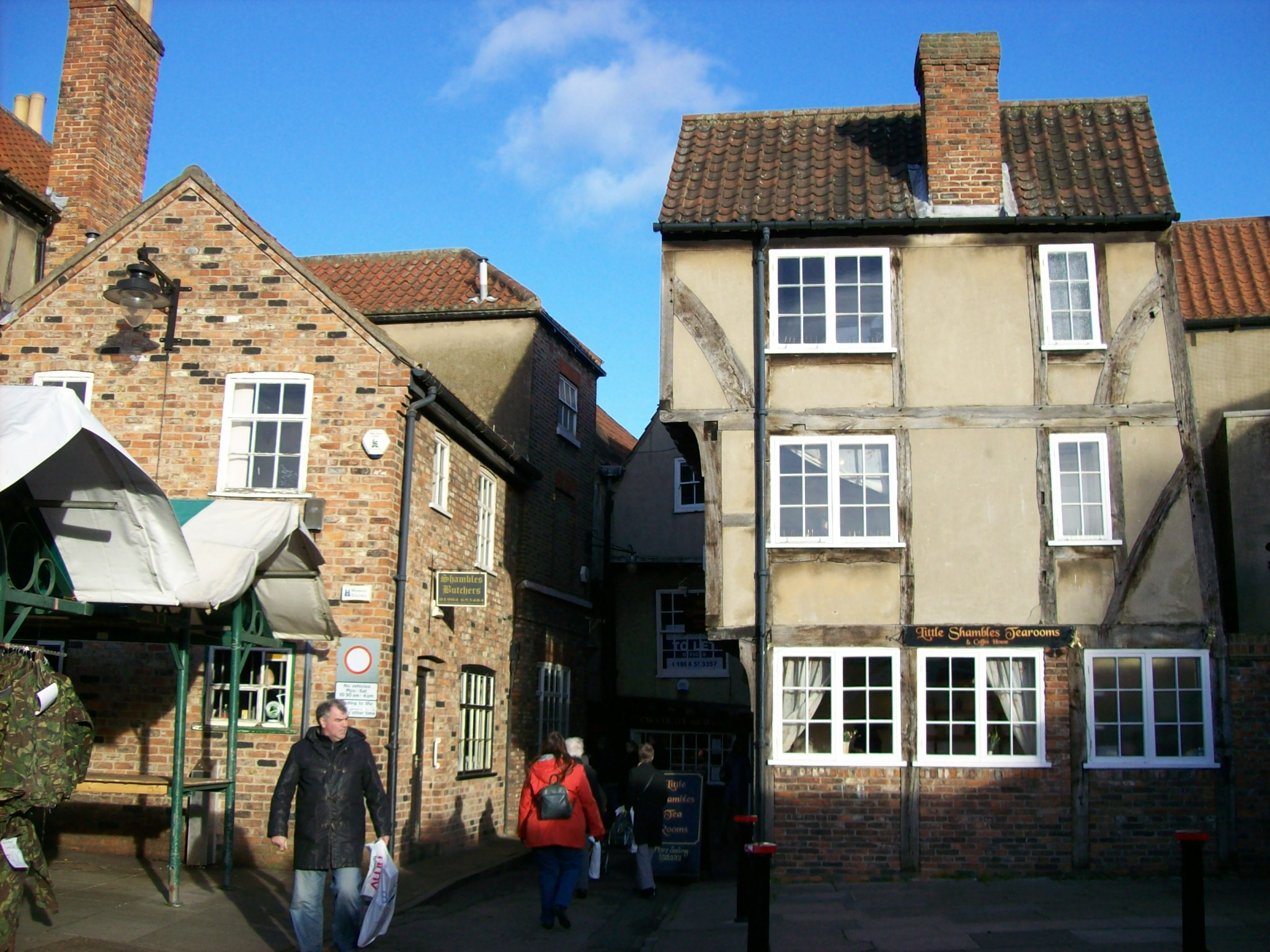
- Little Shambles viewed from Shambles Market towards the Shambles
- Location within York
- Location: York, England
- Coordinates: 53.9594°N 1.0802°W
- North East end: The Shambles
- South West end: Jubbergate

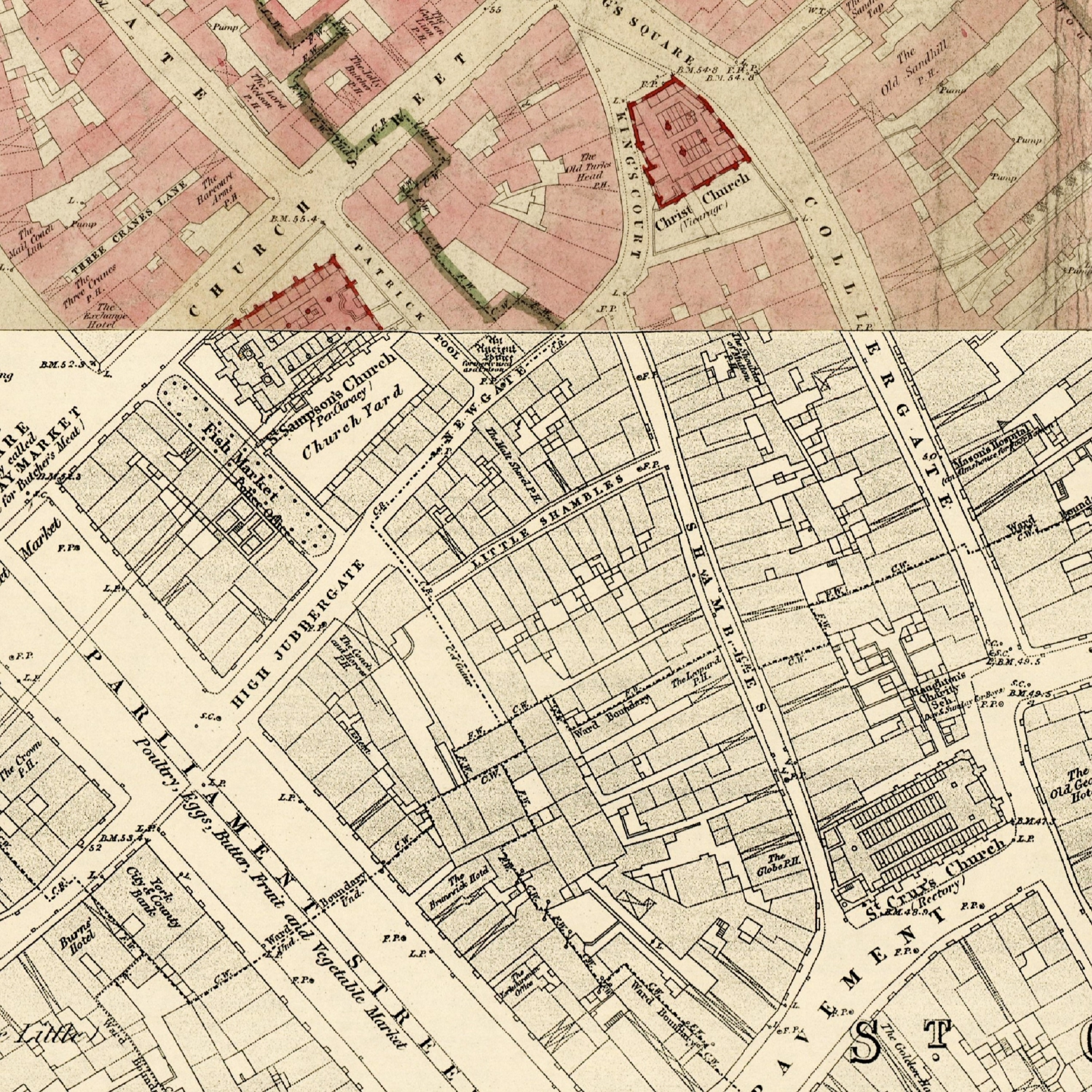
Little Shambles (centre) seen on an 1852 map

Little Shambles is a short historic street in the city centre of the city of York, England. The street dates back to medieval times and forms a small branch off street from the main street of The Shambles. The street was largely demolished in the 1950s and what remains now opens out onto a large, open space with market stalls known as Shambles Market.

By the time of the 1940s and 1950s, the area was in a very poor state of repair. Many of the buildings were on the verge of collapsing. From the 1920s, York City Council had purchased numerous properties from private owners with the aim of saving them from ruin. The Second World War prevented much from being done to the Shambles and during this time, the buildings got worse. In 1948, planners drew up plans for the street and neighbouring areas to make extensive changes. They decided that they would demolish most of the buildings in the area to create a new "medieval" market. Shambles Market was created by the demolition of the vast majority of Little Shambles and many side streets.

Along with Little Shambles, many small and equally historic buildings built behind the Shambles were demolished in the 1950s. These included the small snickelways between the buildings that led to some medieval halls and old slaughterhouses that the butcher shops used. Today, some of these restorations are seen as insensitive, since a great deal of historic fabric, including slaughterhouses and outbuildings at the rear of the properties, was demolished. The Yorkshire Architectural and York Archaeological Society's annual report of 1949 contains plans of the Shambles showing the buildings to be removed.

2 Jubbergate is one of the last surviving buildings to form part of Little Shambles. In 1928, the building was restored. It was grade II* listed in 1954, and in 1957, the York Conservation Trust purchased the freehold. As part of the creation of the Shambles Market, the neighbouring buildings that formed the street were demolished, and it is now freestanding, almost surrounded by the market.

Another surviving building is 1 Little Shambles, a 15th-century, timber-framed, grade II listed building.
