= York's Chocolate Story =

Food museum in York, England

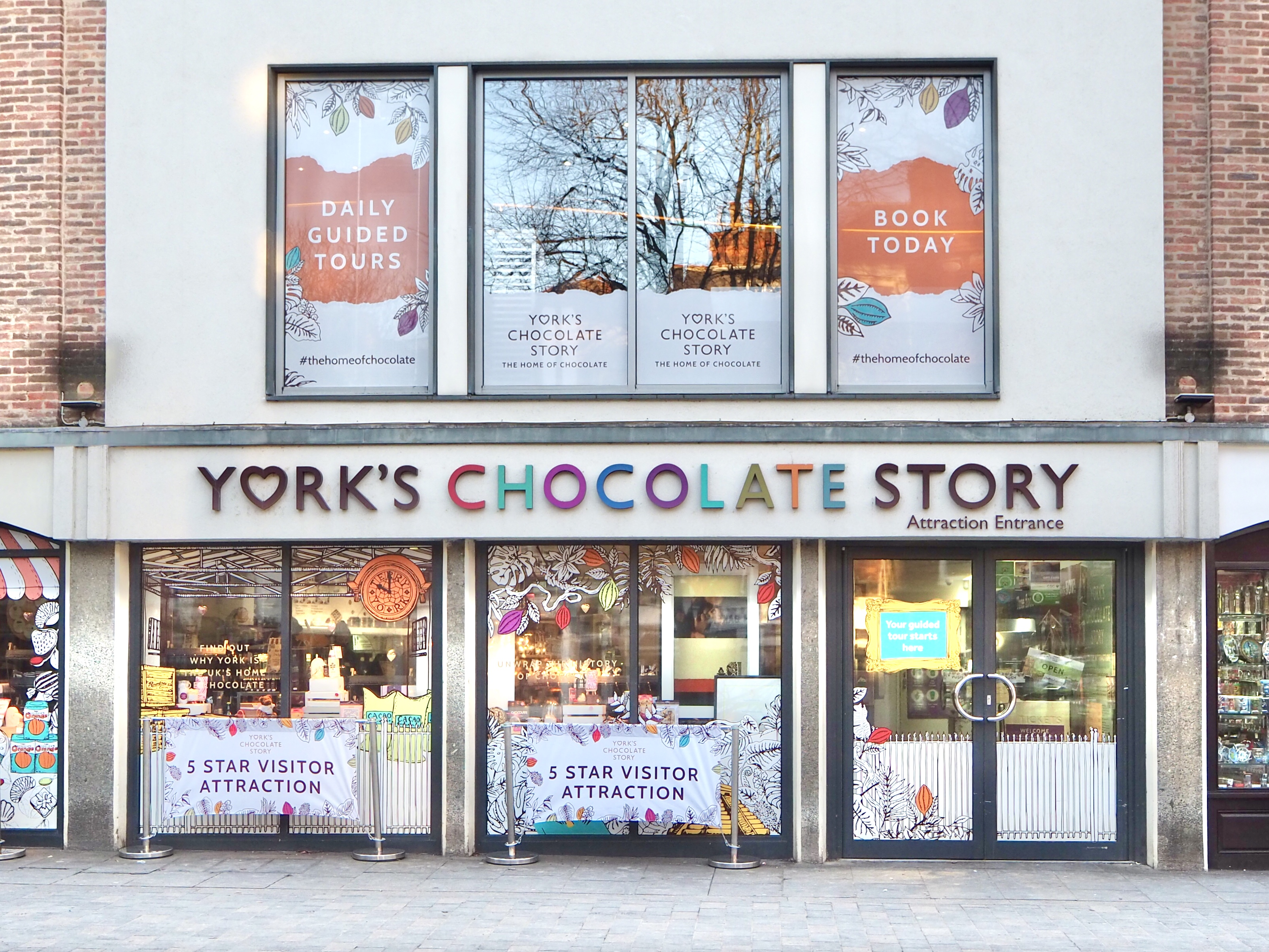
- Established: March 2012
- Location: King's Square, York, England
- Coordinates: 53°57′36″N 1°04′49.5″W
- Type: Food and Local history museum
- Owner: Continuum Attractions
- Website: www.yorkschocolatestory.com

York's Chocolate Story is an interactive visitor attraction and chocolate museum in King's Square, in York. It opened in March 2012.

== History ==
Opened in March 2012, the museum focuses on the history of chocolate making in York. The attraction is located in the centre of York, in King's Square, close to The Shambles. The museum touches on the history of chocolate across the numerous factories, including the Rowntree's factory which opened in 1890, owned since 1988 by Nestlé, and the Terry's factory, which opened in 1926. The museum also collects stories from the workers in these factories, and shows the social impact that chocolate had on the city of York, for example through the facilities provided for the workers of Rowntree's factory including the Joseph Rowntree Theatre and Rowntree Park. The attraction also includes a detailed history of chocolate and its beginnings in modern-day Mexico and how it spread to Europe.

The tour includes a detailed explanation of how chocolate was and is made to this day, including an interactive chocolate-making process where the visitors can create their own chocolate products. The museum also offers a number of chocolate making workshops and experiences. In addition, there is a gift shop and chocolate-themed cafe on site.

In 2018, it won gold in the Guided Tour of the Year category of the VisitEngland Awards. In 2019, it won bronze in the Best UK Leisure Attraction category and silver in the Best UK Heritage Attraction category of the British Travel Awards.
