= Colliergate drill hall =

Listed building in York, England

- Colliergate, York, England
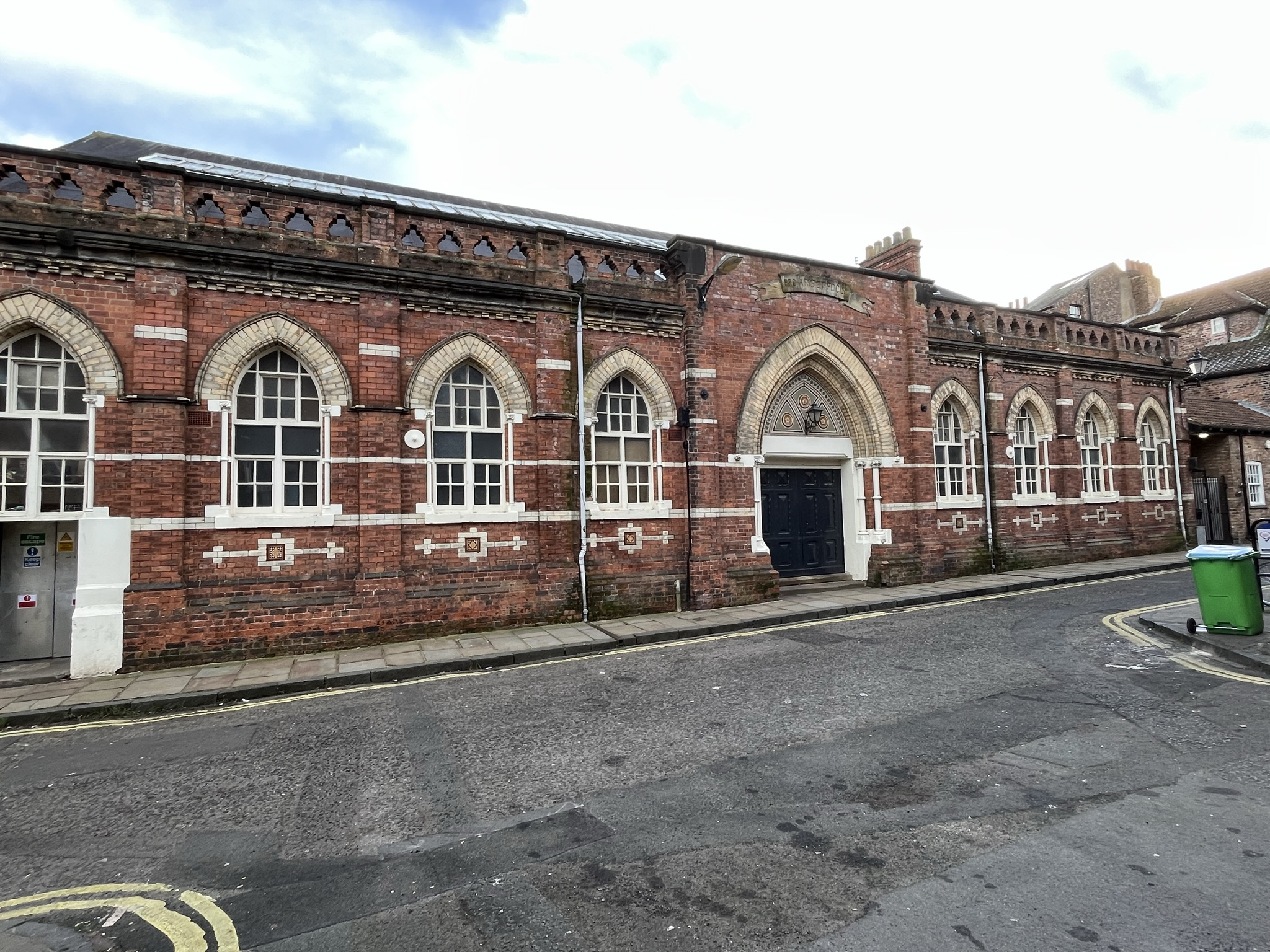
- The building in 2023

Site information
- Type: Drill hall

Location
- Location within North Yorkshire
- Coordinates: 53.96032°N 1.07958°W

Site history
- Built: 1872
- Built for: War Office
- Architect: Gould and Fisher
- In use: 1872–c. 1960
- Fate: Converted to retail use

Designations

Listed Building – Grade II
- Official name: Number 28A and attached drill hall
- Designated: 1 July 1968
- Reference no.: 1258037

The Colliergate drill hall is a former military installation at the corner of Colliergate and St Andrewgate in York, England.

== History ==
The building was designed as a house and later converted into an inn in the mid-18th century. It was altered for military use in 1872 with the addition of a drill hall designed by Gould and Fisher, as the headquarters of the 1st West Yorkshire (York) Rifle Volunteers. This unit evolved into the 1st West Yorkshire (York) Rifle Volunteer Battalion, The Prince of Wales's Own Regiment of Yorkshire in 1881, and the 5th Battalion, The Prince of Wales's Own Regiment of Yorkshire in 1908. The battalion was mobilised at the drill hall in August 1914 before being deployed to the Western Front.

Elements of the 5th Battalion, The West Yorkshire Regiment, continued to use the drill hall until the battalion amalgamated with the 4th Battalion, The East Yorkshire Regiment, to form the 3rd Battalion, The Prince of Wales's Own Regiment of Yorkshire in 1960. The building was Grade II listed in 1968. After the new battalion was established at Lumley Barracks in York, the Colliergate drill hall was decommissioned and has since been converted for use as a hardware store.

== See also ==
- Listed buildings in York (within the city walls, northern part)
