= 5 and 6 King's Court =

Listed building in York, England

Coordinates: 53°57′36″N 1°04′49″W

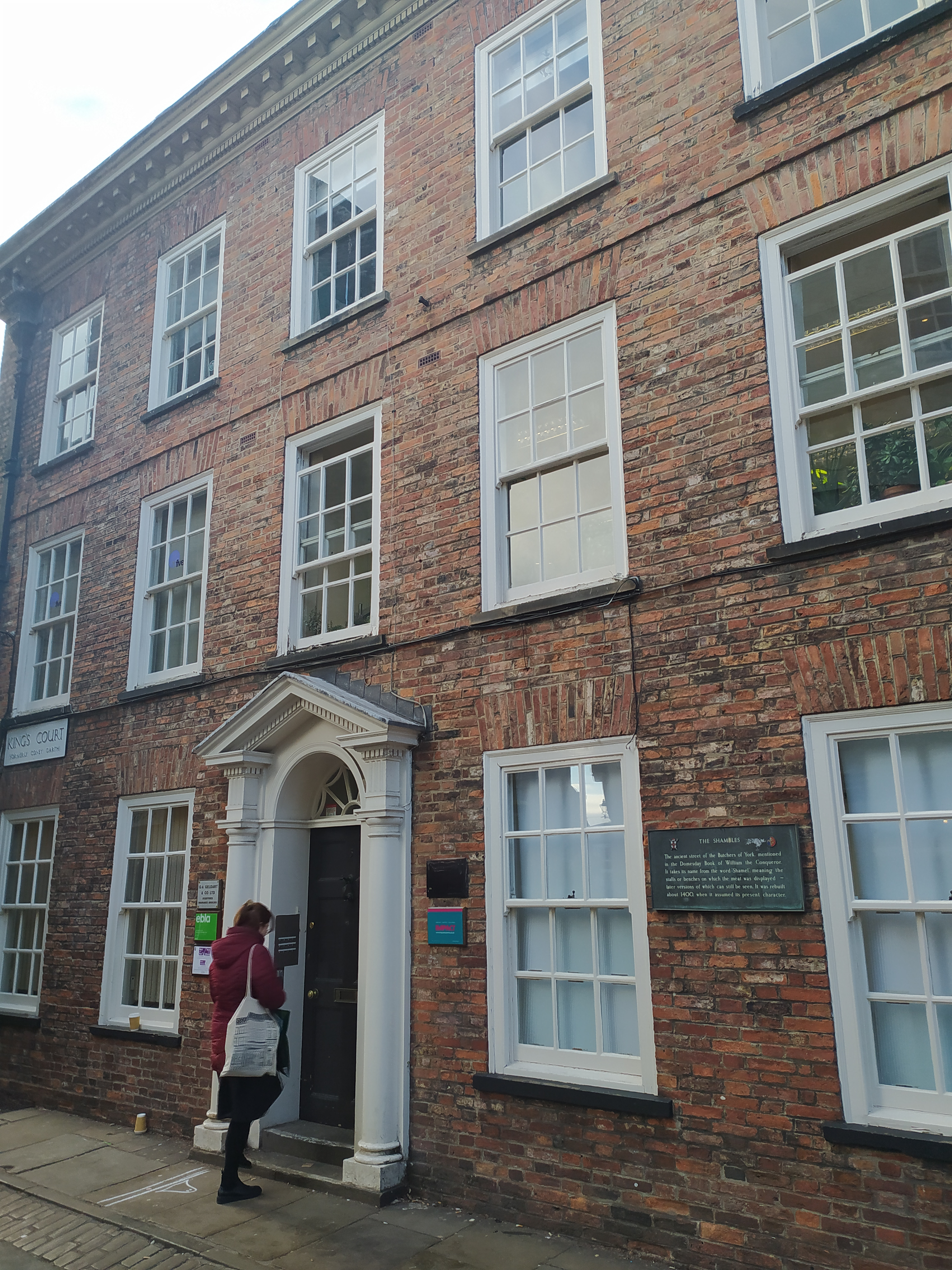
- The building in 2023
- Interactive map of the 5 and 6 King's Court area

General information
- Location: King's Court, York, England
- Year built: 16th century (rear ranges)
- Renovated: Mid-18th century (front block); 1951 (rebuilt and restored)

Technical details
- Material: Brick, timber, pantile roofs
- Floor count: 3

Listed Building – Grade II
- Official name: 5 and 6, Kings Court
- Designated: 14 June 1954
- Reference no.: 1257518

5 and 6 King's Court is a historic building in the city centre of York, England.

== History ==
In 1376 and 1505, a building named Hellekeld was recorded as lying on King's Court, and the Royal Commission on the Historical Monuments of England argues that this may be on the site of 5 and 6 King's Court. The oldest part of the present building is at the rear of the site, facing onto Pump Court. It is a three-storey timber-framed building, dating from the 16th century, and both the upper storeys are jettied. It appears that this building suffered some subsidence, and several braces were added to counter this.

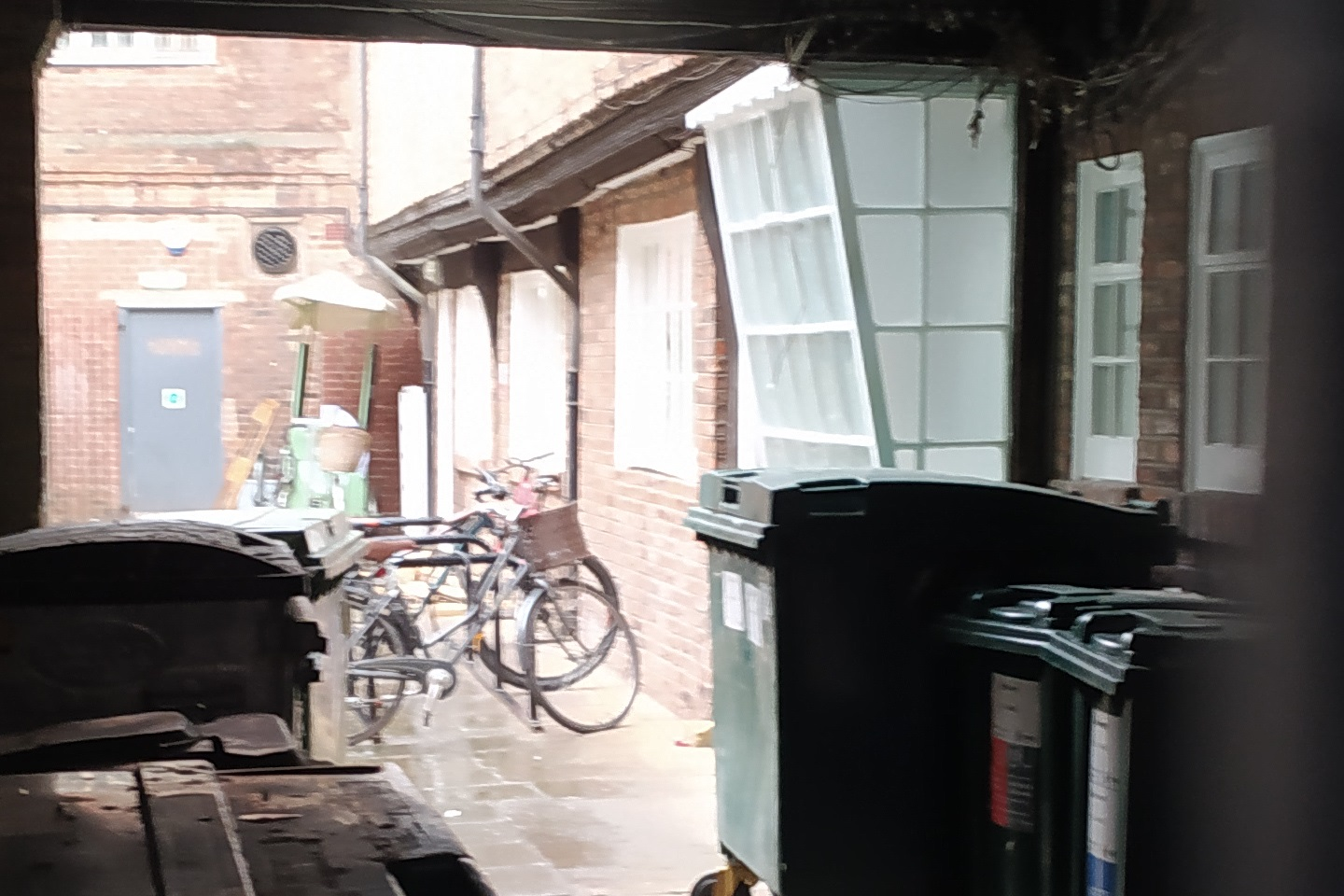
The rear block, facing onto Pump Court

The front block of the building also has three storeys. It was originally timber-framed and jettied, but in 1755 it was remodelled, and the front wall was rebuilt in brick. In the 19th century, shop windows were added on the ground floor of the building.

The entire building was largely rebuilt in 1951. The front retains only the cornice of the 1755 structure, but other features such as its windows, and a drainpipe head dated 1755, are copies of the 18th-century work. Inside, some beams and a fireplace survive from the 18th-century building. In the rear block, much of the second-floor frame is 16th century, in addition to a few ground-floor beams. The basement has stone walls, reused square stone column bases, and massive oak posts.

The building was Grade II listed in 1954.

== See also ==
- Listed buildings in York (within the city walls, northern part)
