= Colliergate =

Street in York, England

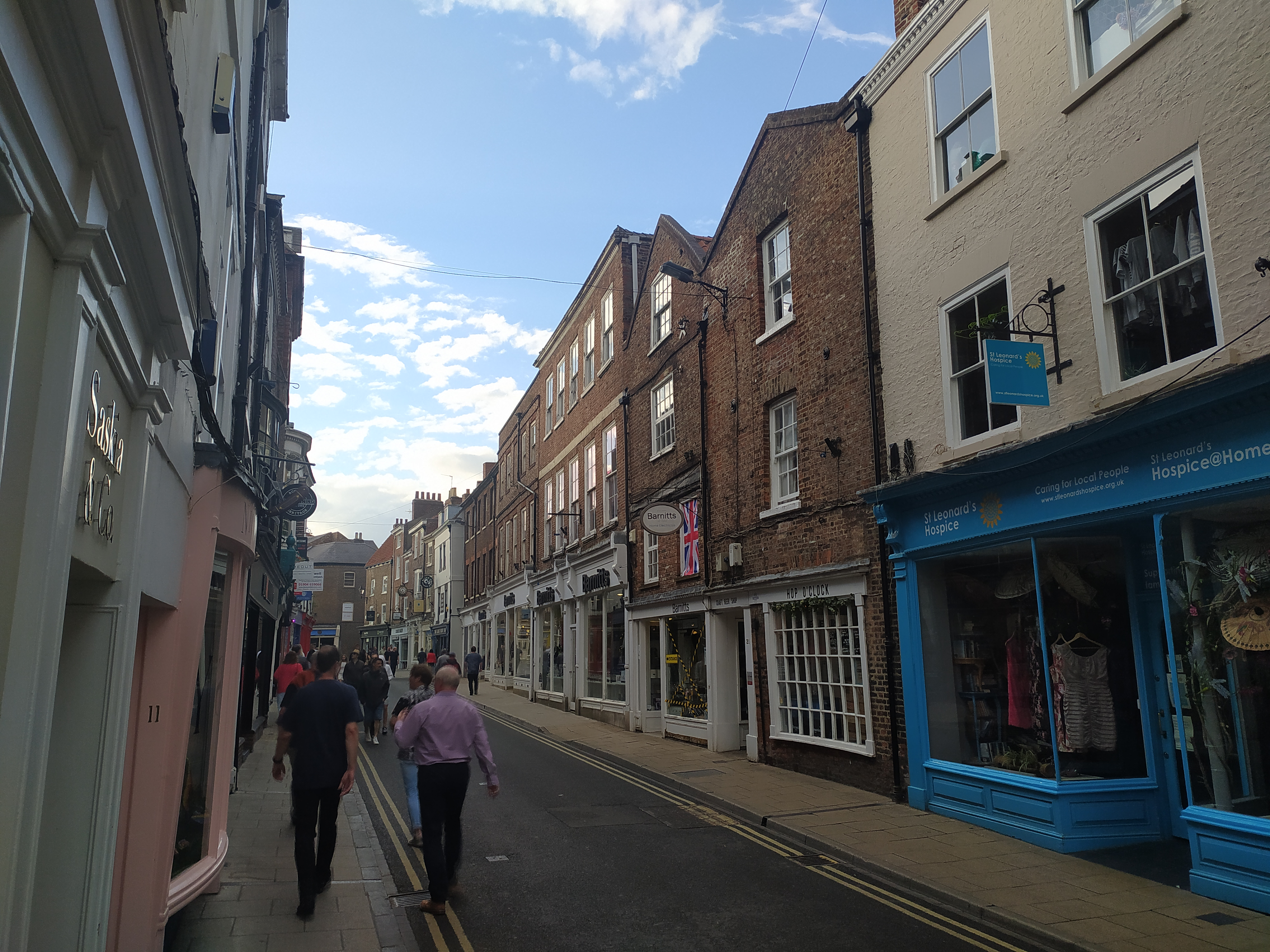
- View north-west on Colliergate
- Location within York
- Location: York, England
- Postal code: YO
- Coordinates: 53.9599°N 1.0797°W
- North end: King's Square
- South end: St Saviourgate; Whip-Ma-Whop-Ma-Gate

Colliergate is a street in the city centre of York, England.

== History ==
The area occupied by the street lay outside the Roman city walls but fell within the Canabae of Eboracum, a residential and industrial zone. It is believed that, during the Viking Jorvik period, the street formed the eastern side of a long open area. The name of the street first appeared in 1303, arising from the charcoal merchants who worked there. A statue of Ebraucus, the legendary founder of the city, stood where the street meets St Saviourgate; this may have been a reused Roman statue.

Margaret Mason's Hospital, an almshouse, was built on the street in 1732, and survived until the 1950s. In 1829 the northern end of the street was widened by demolishing part of Holy Trinity, King's Court. The church was entirely removed in 1937 and King's Square enlarged, so Colliergate now runs along part of the east side of the square. The Colliergate drill hall opened on the street in 1872, while Barnitts department store opened there in 1896. Over time Barnitts expanded and now occupies the drill hall among other buildings.

== Architecture and layout ==
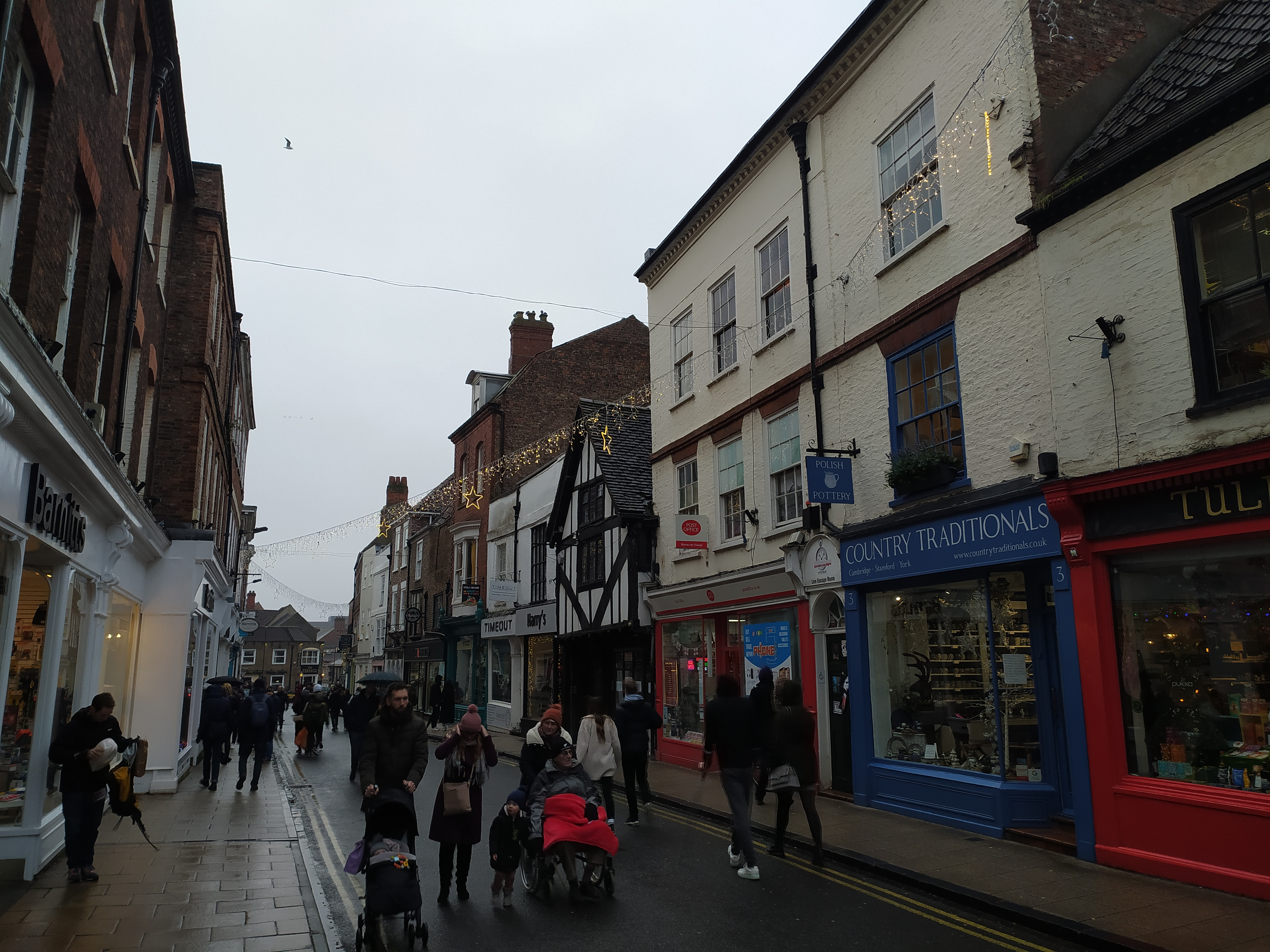
View south on Colliergate

The street runs from King's Square south to the junction of St Saviourgate and Whip-Ma-Whop-Ma-Gate. North of King's Square, its continuation is Petergate. Almost all the buildings on the street are listed.

On the west side of the street, Nos. 1–2 and Nos. 3–4A date from the Georgian period, while No. 5 was originally built in the 16th century and is also noted for its modern ogee arched doorway. The street continues with buildings remodelled in the Georgian era: Nos. 6–7, No. 8, No. 9, No. 10, No. 11, and Nos. 13–14, of which No. 9 and No. 11 contain some medieval material. No. 17 dates from the mid-18th century.

On the east side, all the buildings are listed, most being Georgian. Nikolaus Pevsner describes Nos. 18–19 as the best building, built in 1748 by Ralph Yoward; next are the early-18th-century No. 20, and No. 21; No. 22 built around 1700; No. 23 and No. 24 from the early 18th century, with No. 23 notable for its staircase, built in 1700; the mid-18th-century Nos. 25–26; No. 27 with 16th-century origins, including some timber framing; the early-19th-century No. 28 and No. 28A; Nos. 29–30, built around 1800 and about 1845 respectively; and No. 31, from around 1840.
