= Jubbergate =

Street in the City of York, England

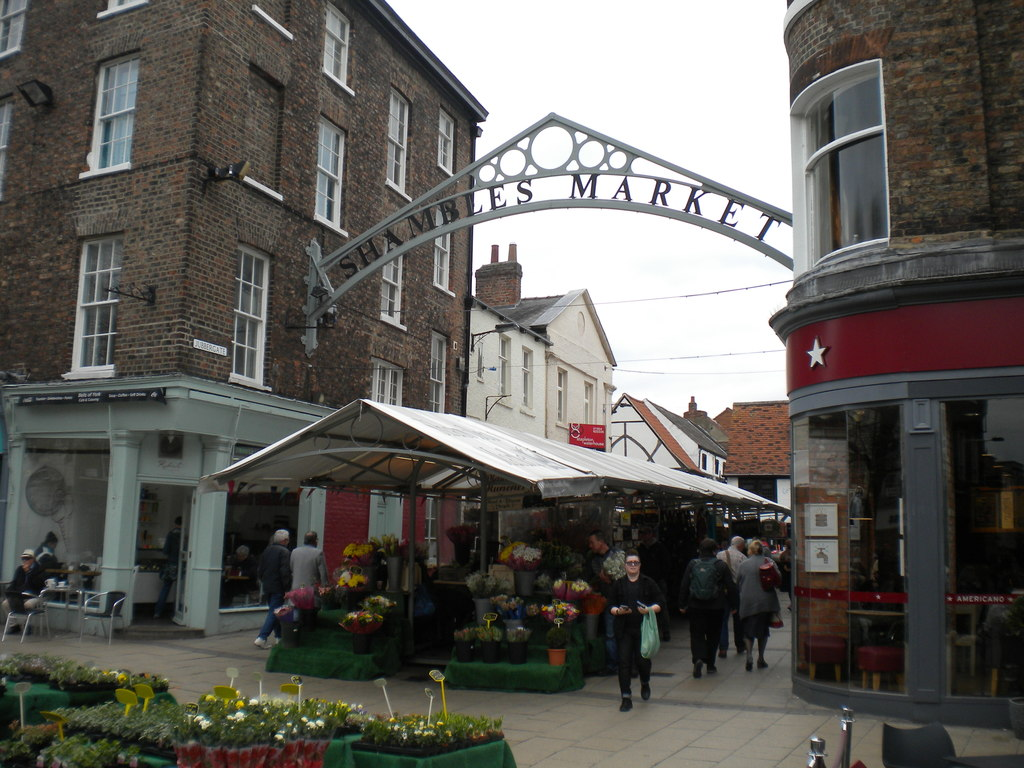
- Jubbergate; entrance to Shambles Market
- Location within York
- Former name: Brettegate
- Location: York, England
- Coordinates: 53.959°N 1.081°W
- North-east end: Newgate
- South-west end: Parliament Street

Jubbergate is a short street in the centre of York, England. Originally called Brettegate, it was renamed Joubrettgate in 1280 after it became a home to some of York's Jewish community. The road connects with Newgate and The Shambles in the north, and Parliament Street in the south.

== History ==
Whilst the exact age of the street is undated, it was known as being the southern point of a Roman fortress, which was built on the site of York Minster. Excavations in 1849 found evidence of burnt wheat, a supposed granary, some 16 feet (4.9 m) below the street level. The street was originally called Brettgate, or Brettegate (the street where the Celtic Britons lived), and when the Jewish community moved in c. 1280, it became Jewbrettgate, later becoming Jubbergate, partly to avoid confusion with another Bretgate in York at that time (now Navigation Road). At least three roads in the area were named after the Jewish community; Coney Street, Finkle Street and Jubbergate. A Jewish community prospered in the city during the reign of King Henry II (1154–1189), with property deeds indicated many lived in Jubbergate or Coney Street. However, they either were killed, or committed suicide in the Pogrom of 1190.

Jubbergate was selected as one of the sites where the Medieval York Mystery Plays (originally known as the Corpus Christi Pageants) were to be performed from 1394 onwards. The plays were so popular, that King Richard II travelled to York to see them.

The part of the street that was north-east of Peter Lane was known as High Jubbergate, and the part south-west of it known as Low Jubbergate. The creation of Parliament Street in 1836, led to a shortening of Jubbergate. The previous south end of the street, known as High Jubbergate, was widened in 1852 and renamed Market Street.

The modern-day road is part of the pedestrianised area of York and has a metal sign straddling the west and east sides of the road indicating the entrance to the Shambles Market. As part of a £2 million scheme, the City of York Council approved anti-terror bollards across the city in 2020, with fixed bollards being installed in Jubbergate.

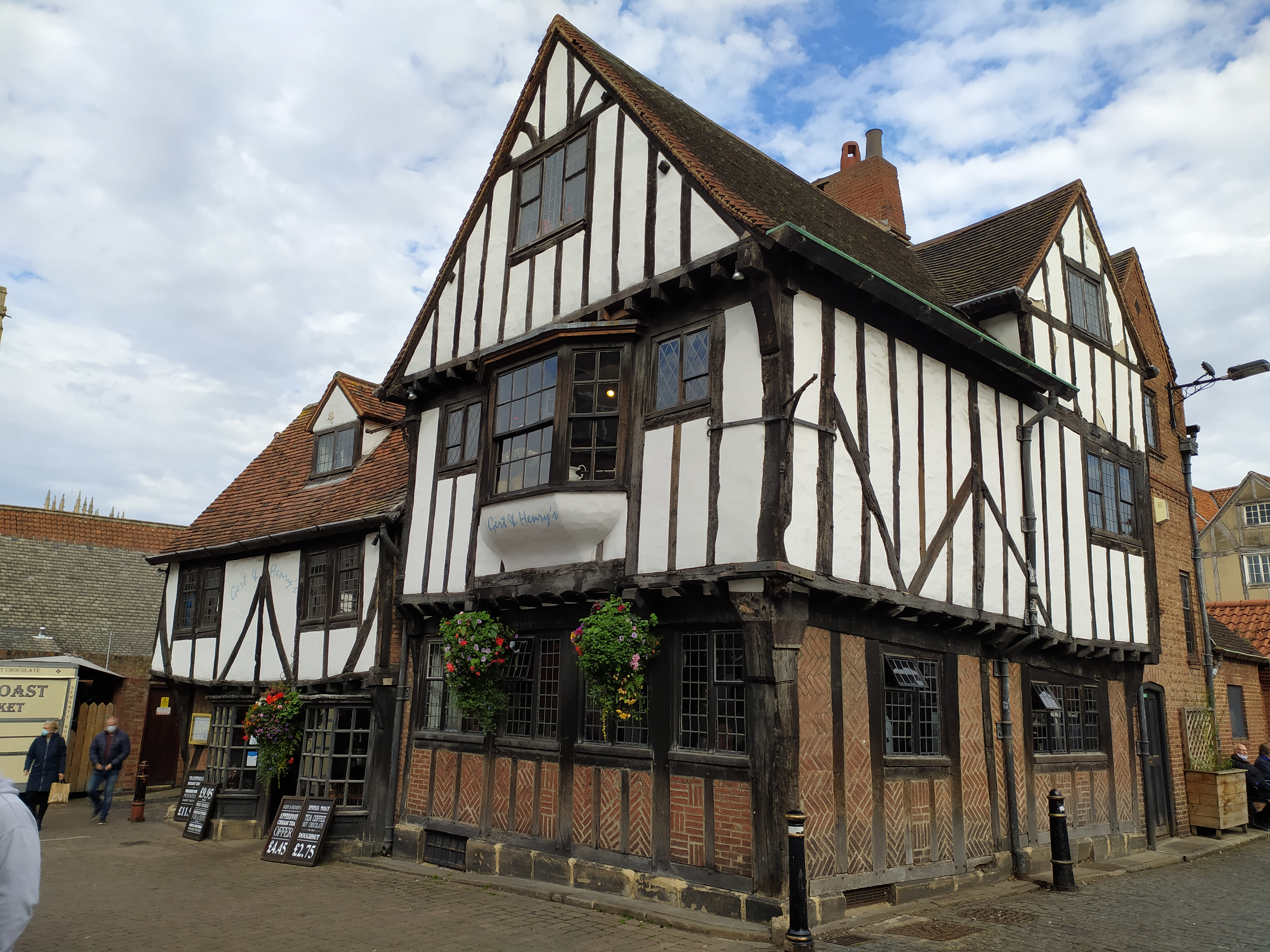
2 Jubbergate

== Layout and architecture ==
Jubbergate runs in a south-west to north-east direction, connecting with Newgate and The Shambles at the north-eastern end, Little Shambles at the east end, Parliament Street in the south, and Silver Street and Patrick Pool on the western side. The listed building of 2 Jubbergate (also known as No. 4 Jubbergate), sits just at the northern edge of the road, and is combined of 14th century and 17th century architecture. It is where the mail coaches to London used to leave from, and although now quite open space, it used to be surrounded by other buildings. The other buildings around No. 2 Jubbergate were demolished in the mid-20th century to make space for the Newgate market.

A writer in 1818, states that high walls were present on Jubbergate, evidence of a past synagogue on the street. Traditionally, as with other cities, the Jewish areas were without the city walls (outside of them), so the walls on Jubbergate were not part of York's defences.
