= King's Square, York =

Open space in York, England

King's Square
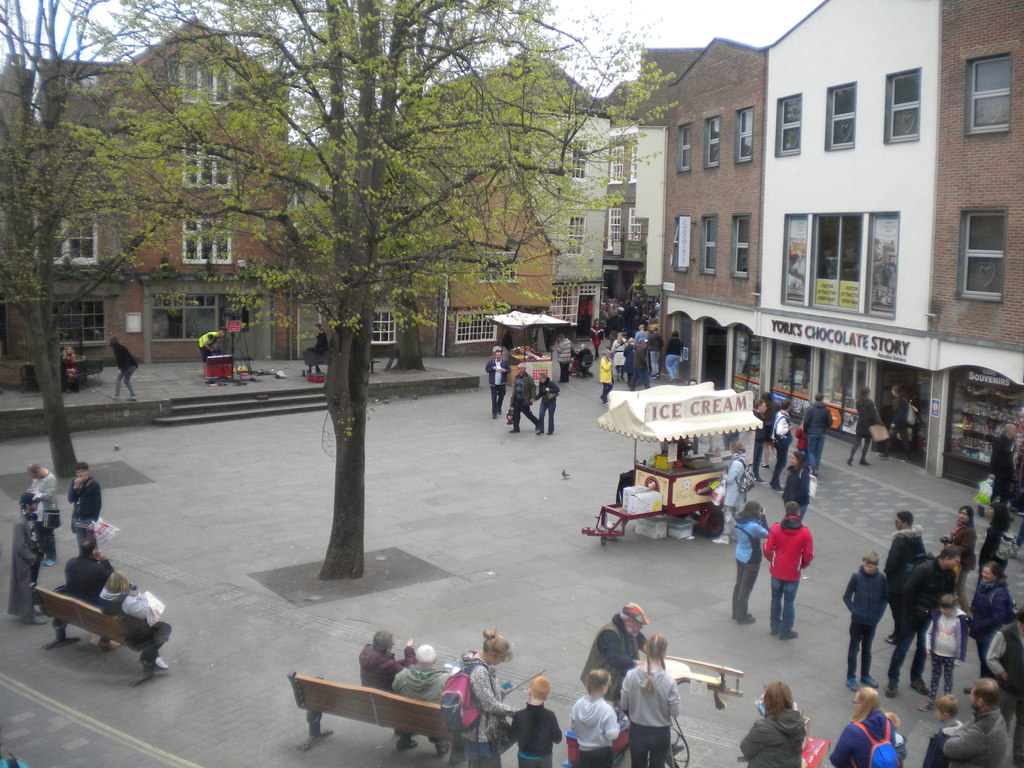
- King's Square in 2017, looking southwest towards The Shambles
- Location within York
- Maintained by: City of York
- Location: York, England
- Coordinates: 53.9601°N 1.0802°W
- North: Low Petergate; Goodramgate
- East: St Andrewgate
- South: Colliergate; The Shambles
- West: Newgate; Church Street

Construction
- Completion: 1780

King's Square is an open area in the city centre of York, England. It is popular with tourists, who are often entertained by buskers and street performers. Nikolaus Pevsner notes that "the square has trees, which distinguishes it". The York's Chocolate Story attraction lies on the western side of the square.

== History ==
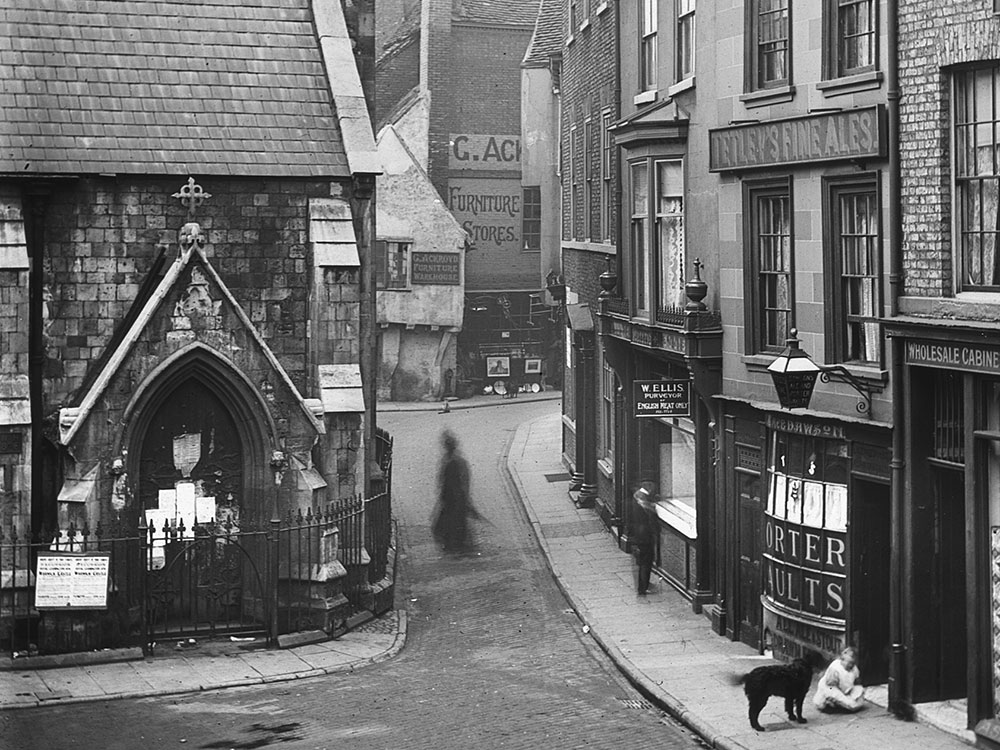
The square pictured around 1910, looking south, prior to the demolition of Holy Trinity Church

In the Roman period, the south-eastern gate of Eboracum lay on the site of what is now King's Square. This was built in about 108, as recorded on a surviving inscription, now in the Yorkshire Museum. The area was mentioned by Egil Skallagrimsson in the 10th-century as "Konungsgarthr" (later being translated for use in the 18th- and 19th-century deeds as Coninggate), and this has led to a belief that this was the location of the royal palace of the Danelaw, and possibly of its predecessors, the Kingdom of Northumbria and the Kingdom of Deira. By 1430, the west side of the square was occupied by a row of mercer's shops, with a building named "Hellekeld" to their south. In 1627, Duke Gill Hall lay on the north-east side of the square, on its corner with St Andrewgate, and it was recorded that the hall was formerly known as "the King's Court".

Until the 18th-century, the square covered only a small area, and was often regarded as the southernmost part of Low Petergate, immediately north of the churchyard of Holy Trinity Church. The churchyard was reduced on several occasions, and from 1780 the area became known as "King's Square". In 1937, the church itself was demolished, and the square reached its current extent. Nineteen of the remaining gravestones were used to pave part of the square, although many are now illegible. The square absorbed the northern part of Colliergate and the whole of the street of King's Court, although those street names are retained by the properties on the extended section of the square. Some Mediaeval buildings on King's Court were demolished as late as the 1950s.

In 2013, the City of York Council spent £490,000 renovating the square.

== Architecture and layout ==
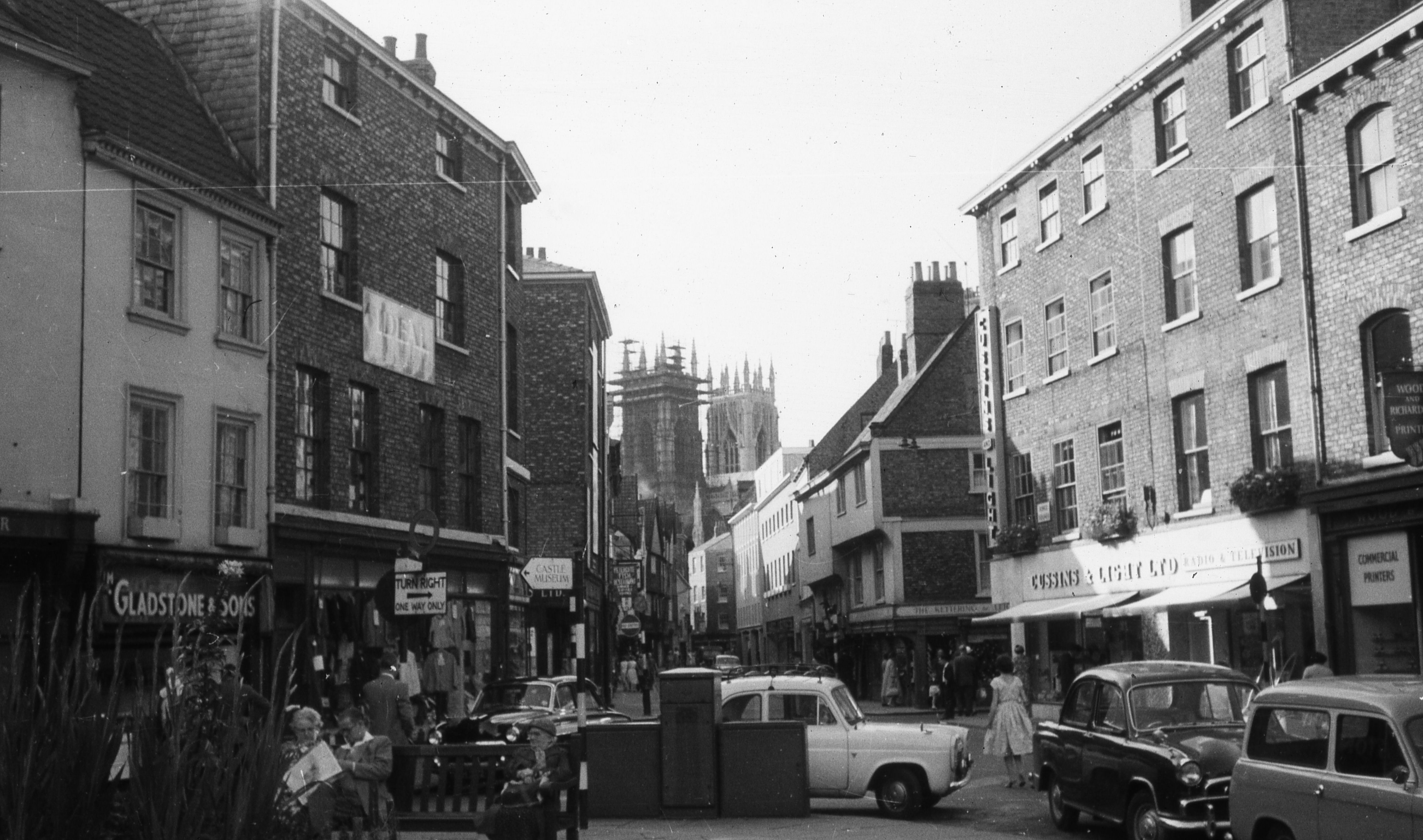
Looking north from King's Square in the 1960s

The square is triangular in shape. From its northern point, Low Petergate leads north-west, Church Street to the south-west, and Goodramgate to the north-east. From its south-western point, beside the Grade II listed St Trinity House, Newgate leads west, and The Shambles to the south. From the south-eastern point, Colliergate leads south. St Andrewgate runs north-east from the middle of the north-east side of the square.

On the south-west side, number 6 King's Square was built in 1587 by Richard Hutton, while 4 King's Court is 15th-century, but was rebuilt in 1963. 5 and 6 King's Court is 16th century in origin, but was largely rebuilt in 1755, and again in 1951. In between is Refuge House, built in 1963. On the south-east side is St Trinity House, which was originally three houses hidden behind the church, dating from the 15th-century or earlier. On the north-east side, 2 King's Court is an early-19th-century shop.
