= Newgate (York) =

Street in York, England

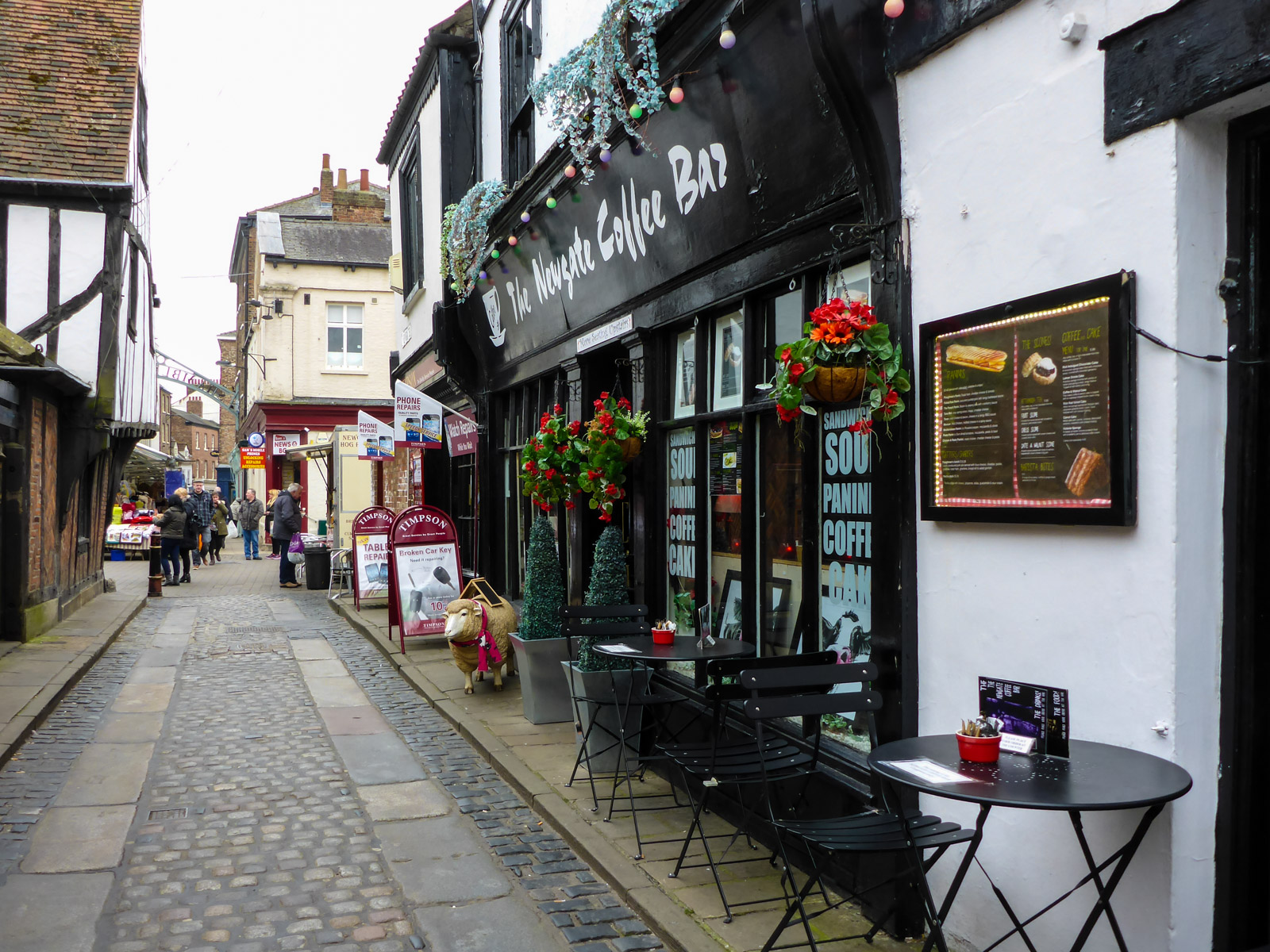
- View west along Newgate
- Location within York
- Location: York, England
- Coordinates: 53.9596°N 1.0807°W
- West end: Jubbergate; Silver Street
- Major junctions: Patrick Pool
- East end: King's Square; The Shambles

Newgate is a street in the city centre of York, in England.

== History ==
The area was occupied in the Viking Jorvik period, and excavations in 1963 found a 10th-century cross shaft. The street itself was not recorded until 1337, but it is believed that the "new" element of its name refers to a widening or paving of the street around that time, rather than the creation of an entirely new street.

Originally, the churchyard of St Sampson adjoined Newgate to the north, but in 1337, a row of cottages were built in the churchyard, along that side of the street, some of which still survive. In the 1750s, the early Methodists in the city often met upstairs at number 6 Newgate, and John Wesley preached there twice. In 1813, the room became a British School for girls, with about 100 attendees, but as the downstairs was being used as a slaughterhouse, the accommodation was not suitable, and the school relocated to St Saviourgate in 1816.

From 1952, a new marketplace for the city was created immediately south of the street, originally named "Newgate Market", but now known as Shambles Market, and this entailed the demolition of several buildings on the south side of the road.

== Architecture and layout ==
The street runs east, from the junction of Jubbergate and Silver Street, to King's Square, where it meets The Shambles. Halfway along the street, it has a junction with Patrick Pool, while to the south, the Shambles Market can be accessed opposite either Patrick Pool, or Silver Street.

Most of the buildings on the street are listed. All the surviving ones with Newgate street addresses lie on its northern side. 6 Newgate was largely rebuilt in 1963, but its ground floor has some Mediaeval masonry, including a Perpendicular window. 11 Newgate is an early 19th-century shop, while 12 to 15 are the surviving cottages of 1337, now converted into shops, with number 12 the best preserved. The main building on Newgate's southern side is 2 Jubbergate, a 14th-century timber-framed building, now used as a restaurant.
