= Holy Trinity Church, King's Court =

Holy Trinity Church
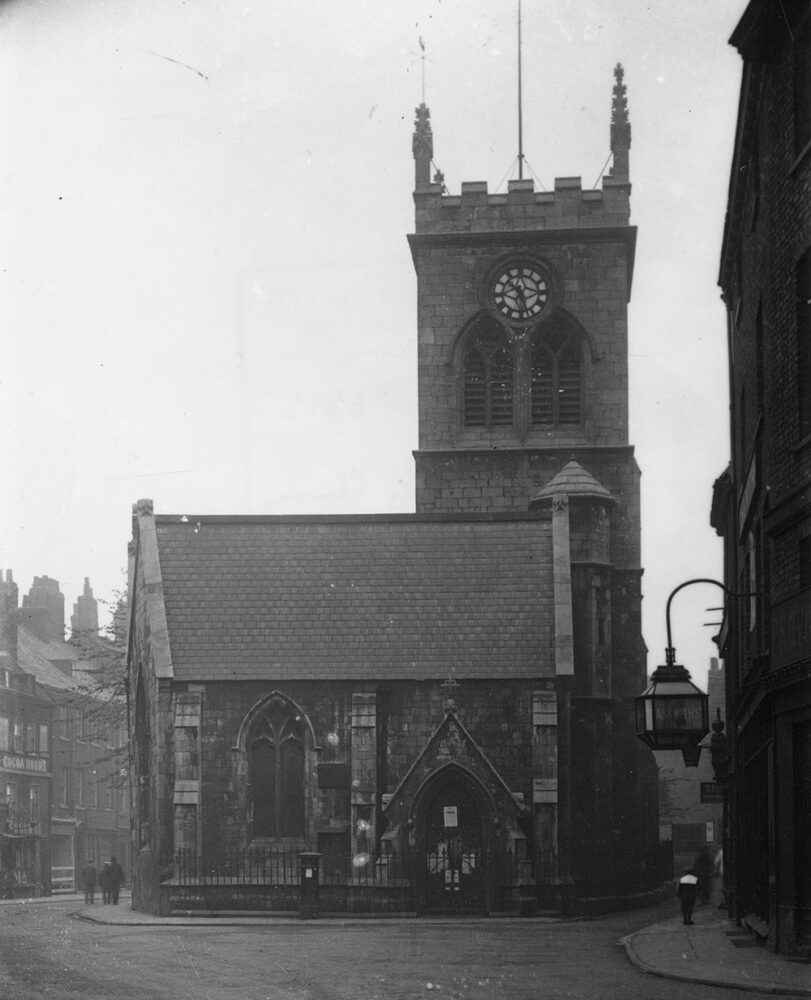
- The church c. 1910, looking south from Church Street
- Holy Trinity Church
- 53.96008°N 1.08014°W
- OS grid reference: SE 60347 51968
- Location: York
- Country: England
- Denomination: Church of England

History
- Former name: Christ Church
- Dedication: Holy Trinity

Architecture
- Demolished: 1937

Administration
- Province: Province of York
- Diocese: Diocese of York
- Archdeaconry: Archdeaconry of York
- Deanery: York Deanery

Holy Trinity Church, also known as Christ Church, was a parish church in the city centre of York, in England.

The church was first recorded in 1268. It was largely or wholly rebuilt in the 14th century, with a nave, north and south aisles, and a 60-foot high tower, and there were further additions in the 15th century. From the 1410s, it was linked with St Michael's Hospital in Well. Although it was a small church, it had at least five chantries in the Mediaeval period.

In 1767, two of the church's chantry chapels were demolished in order to enlarge the neighbouring hay market in what became King's Square. Also in the 1760s, the church's stained glass was removed. Located at a busy junction, at the top of The Shambles, the church became regarded as an impediment to traffic; in 1818, William Hargrove noted that several people had been killed coming around the narrow and sharp corner of the church, and he proposed demolishing the eastern end. In 1829, a triangular part on the east side of the church was demolished, in order that Colliergate could be widened. The demolitions did not resolve the church's issues, and in the 1850s, Sotheran's Guide stated that "the building has been several times curtailed, and if it was altogether removed there would be no loss of architectural beauty, and a great increase to public convenience".

In 1861, the church was rebuilt, in a Decorated style design, by Rawlins Gould. Only the east wall was retained from the old church, but the new church had the same plan, with the additions of north and south porches, and a vestry. In 1877, the church's plate was melted down, to produce new plate.

Due to its declining congregation, its parish was merged with that of St Sampson's Church in 1886, and the church soon became disused. By 1896, it was used to house sheep on their way to slaughter. The furnishings were removed to St Mary Bishophill Junior, and St Everilda's Church, Nether Poppleton. However, the large clock on its tower was maintained.

In 1937, the church was demolished, allowing King's Square to be further enlarged. Part of the square is paved with 19 gravestones from the church's cemetery.
