= Shambles Market =

Market in York, England

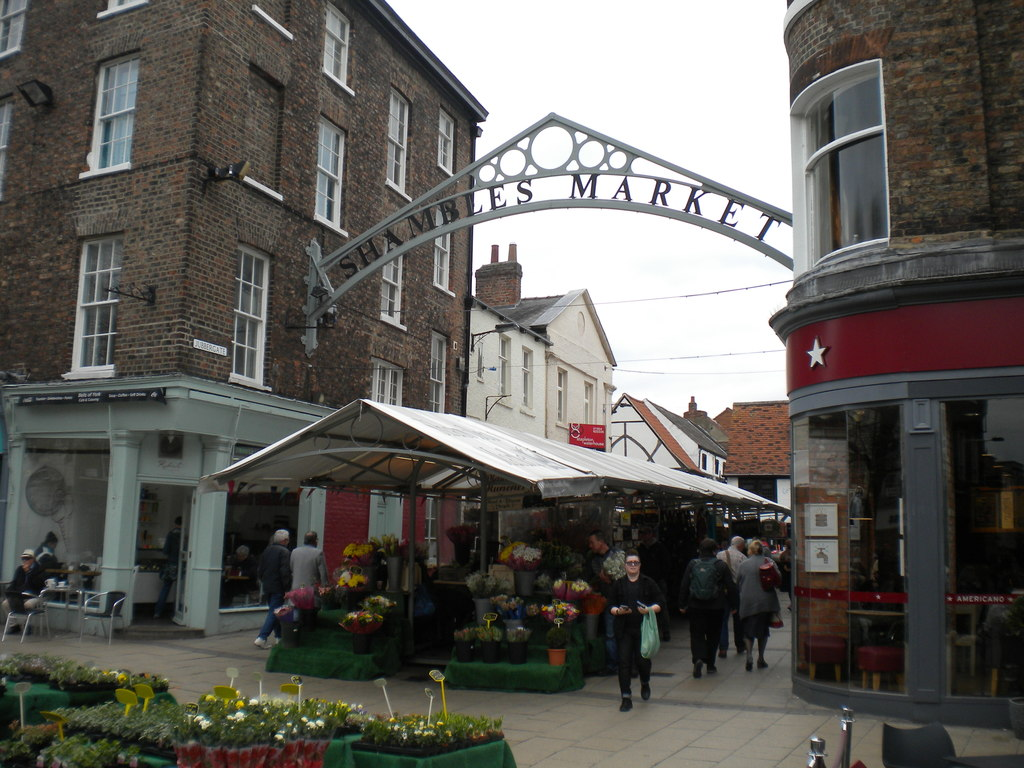
- The Jubbergate entrance to the market
- Location: Silver Street; York, England; 53.959316°N 1.080512°W
- Opening date: 1950s
- Owner: City of York Council
- Environment: Outdoor
- Days normally open: Daily
- Number of tenants: 86
- Interactive map of Shambles Market

The Shambles Market is a daily market held in the city centre of York, England. It was created in the 1950s after the clearance of a large area next to the Shambles, when large sections of the Shambles were demolished, including almost the entirety of the street known as Little Shambles.

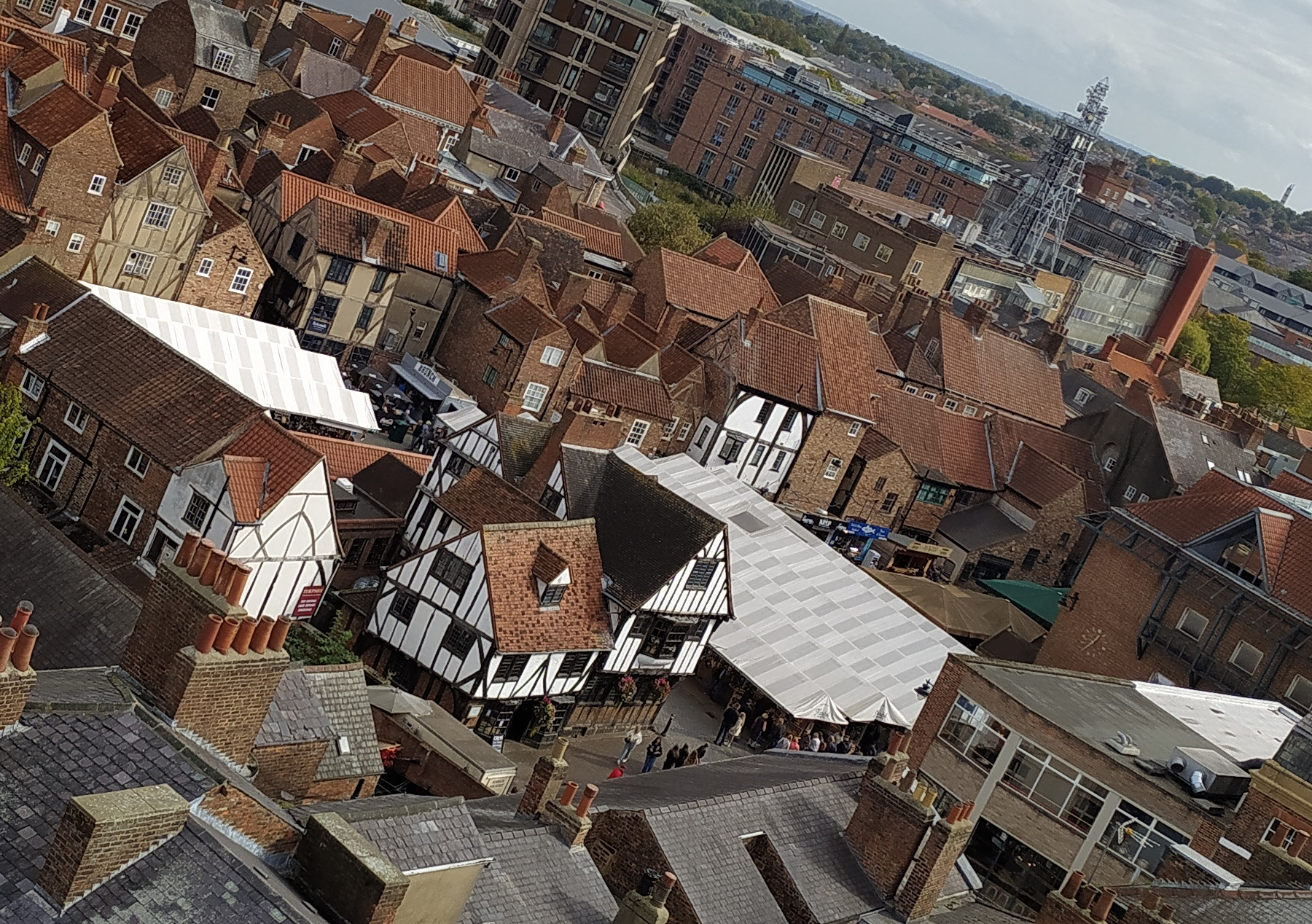
Aerial view of the market

Until 1955 the city's main markets were in Parliament Street and St Sampson's Square. That year, the market in St Sampson's Square was closed, and the one in Parliament Street was reduced to opening only on Saturdays. The displaced market stalls were offered space in a newly cleared area between Newgate, Jubbergate and The Shambles. Today, the demolition of the historic buildings that originally stood in the place of the market is seen as insensitive, since a great deal of historic fabric was destroyed.

The original intention was to name the market "Gell Garth", inspired by "Gail Garth", the mediaeval name for the area. However, it was ultimately named Newgate Market, after the nearby street.

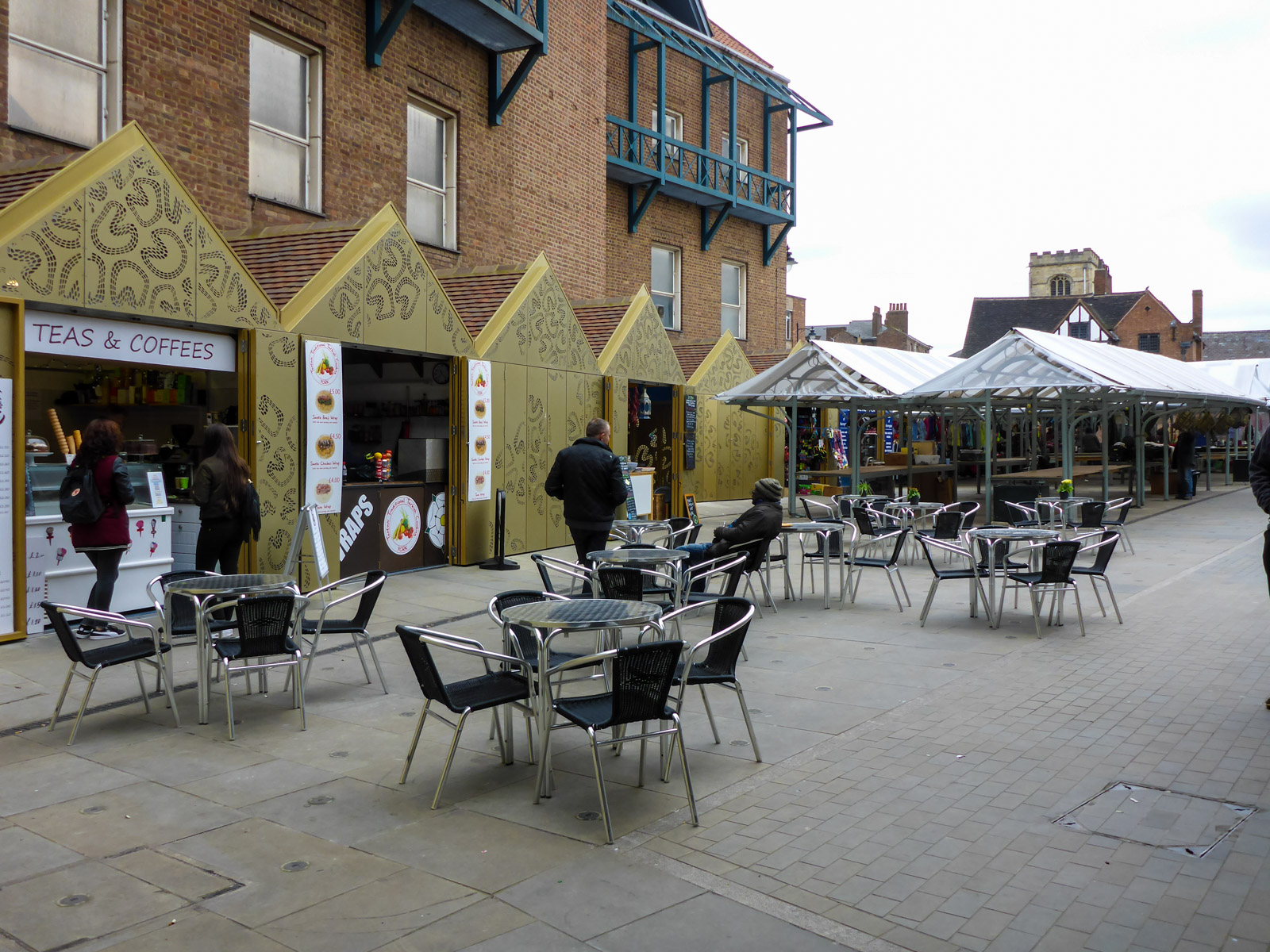
Food area of the market

The market was refurbished in 2014, at a cost of about £1,600,000. It was given the new name "Shambles Market", after the most famous street in the area. The revamped market had 86 stalls, a slight increase, and seven kiosks, with most of the kiosks selling food. At the time, the City of York Council stated that the Saturday market was oversubscribed, but that there were spare stalls on other days. A section of the market can be covered with a marquee for special events, such as farmers' markets.

Permanent stalls were constructed for sales of meat and fish, while other goods were sold from temporary stalls. Stalls at the market include Cross of York, which opened in 1957 and won the national Fishmonger of the Year competition in 2020, and Swain Family Butchers, which celebrated is 50th anniversary in 2022.
