= 52 Stonegate =

Listed building in York, England

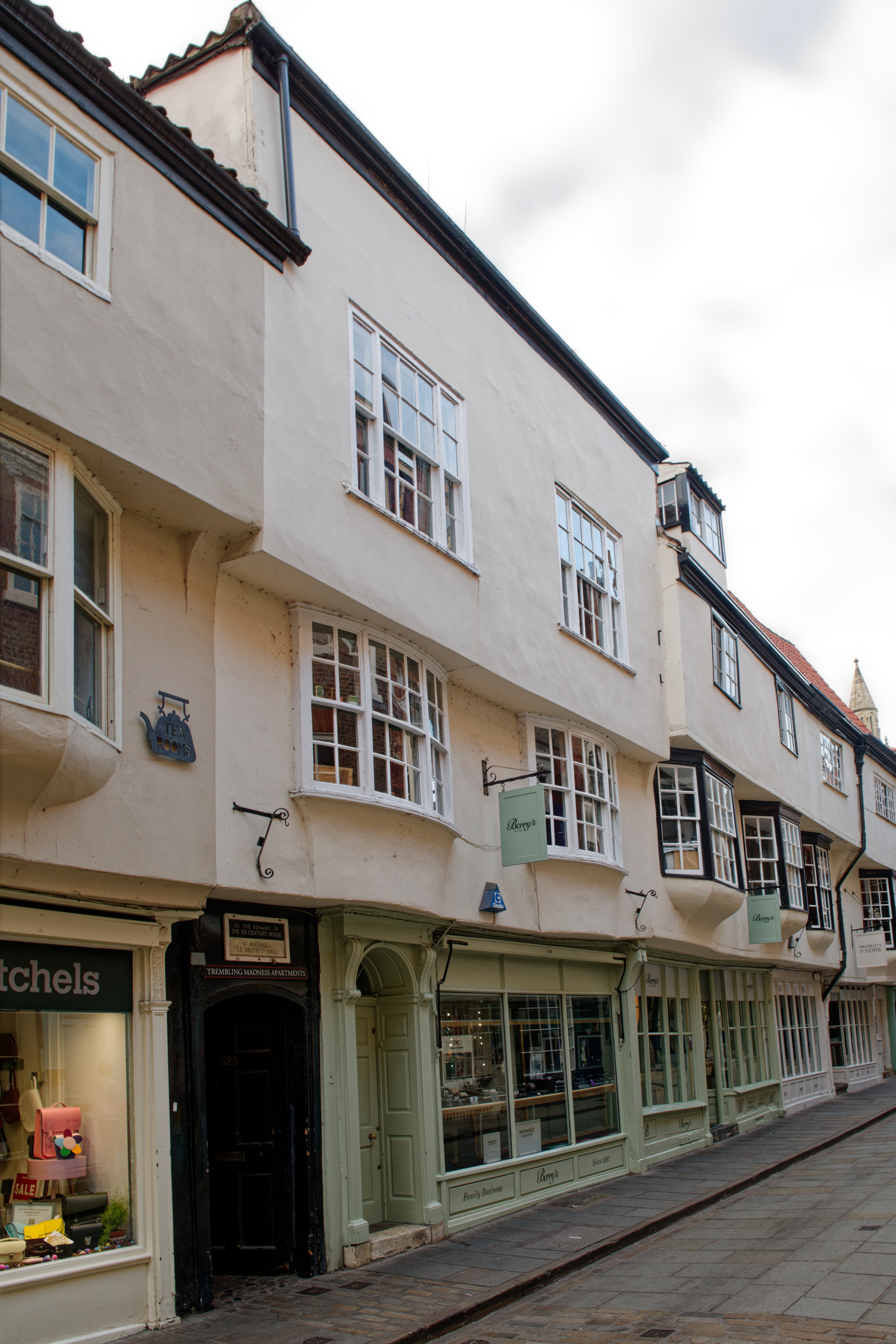
- The building in 2024
- Interactive map of the 52 Stonegate area
- Former names: 35 Stonegate

General information
- Status: Converted to commercial use
- Type: House (former)
- Location: Stonegate, York, England
- Coordinates: 53°57′40″N 1°04′59″W
- Year built: Late 15th century
- Renovated: Late 17th century (extended); Late 19th century (refronted, raised and extended; shopfront); 1964 (altered)

Design and construction
- Designations

Listed Building – Grade II*
- Official name: 52, Stonegate
- Designated: 14 June 1954
- Reference no.: 1256492

52 Stonegate is a Grade II* listed building on Stonegate in the city of York, England. It originated as a late 15th‑century house and was enlarged in the 17th century, with the front rebuilt, the upper floors jettied and the height increased during 19th‑century alterations. The shopfront also dates from that period and was modified in 1964. Formerly known as 35 Stonegate, the building was added to the Central Historic Core conservation area in 1968. It stands within the same row on Stonegate, between Nos. 48–50 and Nos. 54–58, and is now occupied by Berry's Jewellers.

== History ==
The building stands on Stonegate and began as a late-15th‑century house that was enlarged in the 17th century. Its front was later rebuilt, the upper floors were jettied and the height increased, with further alterations made in the 19th century. The shopfront also dates from that period and was changed in 1964, when a rear range was removed. It was formerly known as 35 Stonegate.

On 14 June 1954, No. 52 was designated a Grade II* listed building, and in 1968 the site was included within the newly established Central Historic Core conservation area. It stands in a terrace between Nos. 48–50 and Nos. 54–58, which are also listed at Grade II*. No. 52 is now occupied by Berry's Jewellers.

== Architecture ==
The building has a timber structure and is now covered with render, with colour applied at the front and scored detailing at the back. It has a timber shopfront, timber guttering at the eaves, and a pantile roof with a brick chimney.

It has three storeys and two bays, with the upper floors project slightly over the one below. The shop entrance has decorative vertical strips and carved brackets, with a six‑panel door set beneath a fanlight in a rounded, panelled frame. The shop window has three large panes with a blind fitted above, set within a plain surround. A shaped cornice stands out above the doorway.

To the left, a six‑panel door in a curved opening leads through to Church Passage. The first‑floor windows are shallow bow windows; the second‑floor windows have three parts, each with a 12‑pane centre section. The guttering is enclosed.

The back has three storeys plus attic space, with two gabled sections of different widths; the right-hand gable has simple bargeboards. The windows at the rear are 20th century.

=== Interior ===
The interior includes visible timber framing and the upper parts of a staircase dating from the late 17th century. The staircase has turned balusters with a rounded profile, square newel posts and a shaped handrail. The lower two sections of the staircase were taken out in 1964. Part of an ogee‑headed doorway remains in the through‑passage, and fragments of the timber framing of neighbouring buildings can be seen in the party walls.

== See also ==
- Grade II* listed buildings in the City of York
- Listed buildings in York (within the city walls, northern part)
