= 45 and 47 Stonegate =

Listed building in York, England

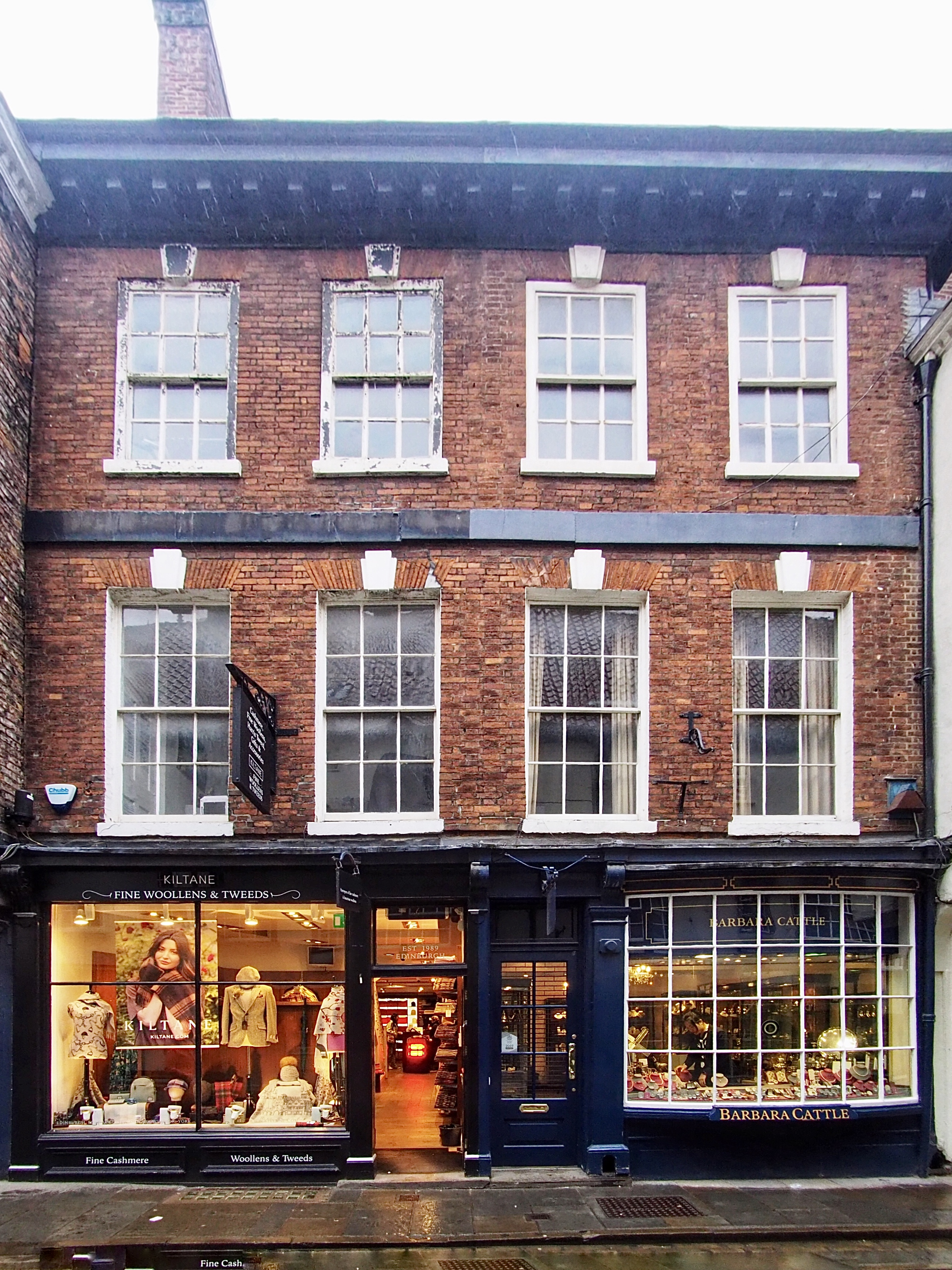
- The building in 2023; No. 45 is on the right
- Interactive map of the 45 and 47 Stonegate area
- Former names: 28 and 29 Stonegate

General information
- Status: Converted to commercial use
- Type: Houses (former)
- Location: Stonegate, York, England
- Coordinates: 53°57′41″N 1°04′57″W
- Year built: Early 18th century
- Renovated: Late 18th century (altered); Mid-19th century (shopfronts)

Design and construction
- Designations

Listed Building – Grade II*
- Official name: 45 and 47, Stonegate
- Designated: 14 June 1954
- Reference no.: 1256489

45 and 47 Stonegate is a Grade II* listed building on Stonegate in the city of York, England. Built in the second quarter of the 18th century, the pair originated as two houses rebuilt by John Blanshard and were later altered and fitted with mid‑19th‑century shopfronts, now forming two shops. The building was added to the Central Historic Core conservation area in 1968. It stands between No. 43 and No. 49, both also Grade II*, with No. 45 occupied by Barbara Cattle jewellers and No. 47 by Kiltane, a clothing shop.

== History ==
Built in the second quarter of the 18th century, the pair of houses were recorded in 1747 as a "messuage divided into two tenements, newly rebuilt by John Blanshard," and are described in their official listing as early-18th‑century houses later altered in the same century and given mid‑19th‑century shopfronts, now forming two shops. It was formerly known as 28 and 29 Stonegate.

On 14 June 1954, Nos. 45–47 were designated a Grade II* listed building, and in 1968 the site was included within the newly established Central Historic Core conservation area. It stands between No. 43 and No. 49, both also listed at Grade II*. No. 45 is now occupied by Barbara Cattle jewellers and No. 47 serves as the premises of Kiltane, a clothing shop.

== Architecture ==
The front of the building is in orange‑red brick, with stone detailing and a pantile roof, while the rear is built in mixed brickwork. It has three storeys and four bays, with shopfronts framed by plain pilasters and a simple cornice on scroll‑shaped brackets. In the centre are two part‑glazed doors with overlights, flanked by a small‑pane bow window on the right and a plate‑glass window on the left. The first floor has 12‑pane sash windows with slender glazing bars, and the second floor has shorter windows of the same pattern; all sit on painted stone sills beneath flat brick arches with painted stone keyblocks. A broad painted band marks the second floor, and the roofline is finished with a heavy moulded cornice.

The rear elevation is also three storeys, with altered windows that mostly retain their segmental brick arches. Raised brick bands run across the first and second floors and continue to the eaves, which are set beneath a corbelled brick cornice.

=== Interior ===
In the cellar of No. 45 there is a wide brick fireplace with a segmental arch, retaining part of its former cooking range. The staircase from the first floor to the attic has been altered: the lower flights have open sides, a mix of twisted and turned balusters, and a heavy handrail that sweeps around a turned newel at the foot; the upper flights have closed sides, turned balusters and square newels with attached half‑balusters. From the first‑floor landing, six‑panel doors set in panelled surrounds lead to the front and rear rooms.

The front room is lined with fielded panelling above a dado rail and has a moulded and dentilled cornice. Its stone fireplace surround is carved with fielded panels and a shell‑shaped keyblock and contains a hob grate; an alcove cupboard to the right has shaped shelves. The door surrounds are carved with egg‑and‑flower ornament.

On the second floor, three‑panel doors on L‑hinges lead to the front and back rooms. The front room has a plain painted stone fireplace with a cast‑iron grate, while the rear room has a moulded fireplace with a cornice shelf and basket grate. Both rooms have moulded cornices. In the front room, part of the return wall to No. 43 is visible, including a section of its timber window surround. The attic has plank‑and‑batten doors on L‑hinges.

No. 47 has a staircase of similar form, but with more elaborate balusters, which have been reset. On the first‑floor landing there is a door fitted with a 19th‑century painted glass panel, possibly by J. W. Knowles.

== See also ==
- Grade II* listed buildings in the City of York
- Listed buildings in York (within the city walls, northern part)
