= The Punch Bowl, Stonegate =

Listed pub in York, England

The Punch Bowl
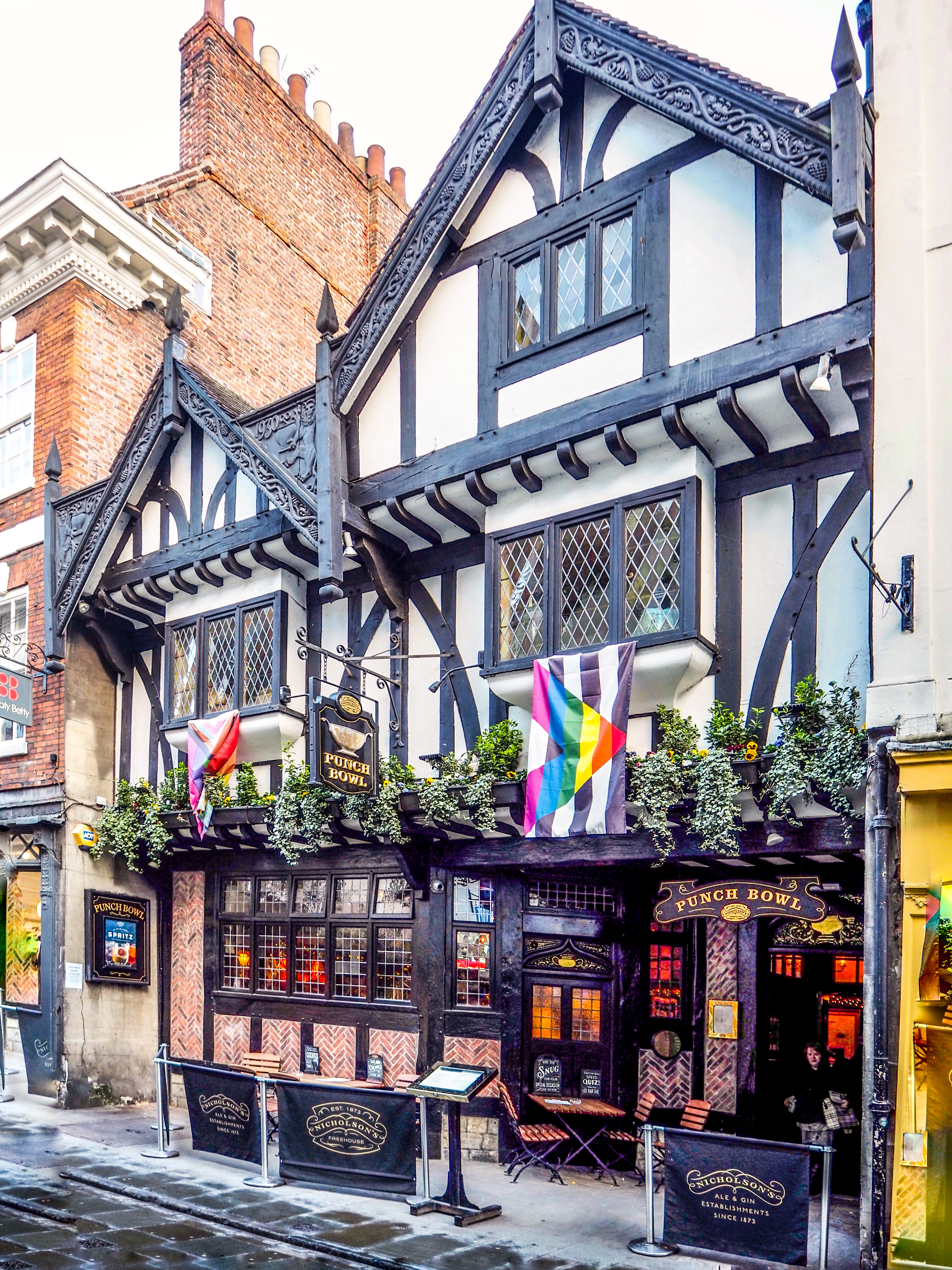
- The pub in 2023

General information
- Type: Public house; originally a coffeehouse
- Location: 7 Stonegate, York, England
- Coordinates: 53.9606°N 1.0838°W
- Year built: 1930 (rebuilt)
- Client: Tadcaster Tower Brewery
- Owner: Mitchells & Butlers

Design and construction
- Architects: Biscomb & Ferry
- Designations

Listed Building – Grade II
- Official name: The Punch Bowl public house
- Designated: 14 June 1954
- Reference no.: 1256535

Website
- Official website

The Punch Bowl is a public house on Stonegate in the city centre of York, England.

The business was founded in 1675 as a coffeehouse, and it became associated with the city's Whigs, who preferred to drink punch. In 1761, it was licensed as a pub, and it became the headquarters of the York Races Committee, and was also popular with the bell ringers at York Minster. In reference to this, a bell clapper from the Minster has been used as a support in the rear bar since 1765.

The building was largely rebuilt over the years, and then burned down in 1930. It was rebuilt in a Brewers' Tudor style, designed by Biscomb & Ferry for the Tadcaster Tower Brewery, with red herringbone brick at the front of the ground floor, and plasterwork above. The rear wing largely survives from the original building, as do three ground floor fireplaces.

The building was Grade II listed in 1954. It stands between No. 5, also listed at Grade II, and the Grade II*‑listed Nos. 9, 9A and 11. In 2019, it was renovated, at which time, it was owned by Nicholson's. As of June 2025, the freehold is owned by Mitchells & Butlers.

== See also ==
- Listed buildings in York (within the city walls, northern part)
