= Stonegate (York) =

Street in York, England

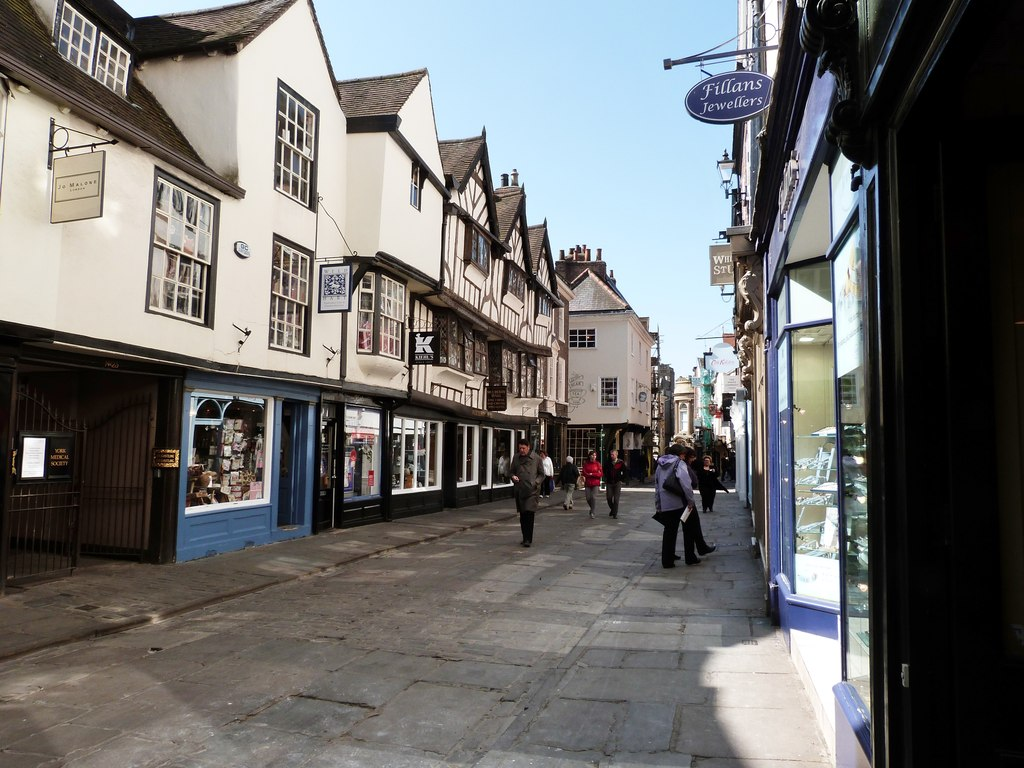
- Looking south-west on Stonegate
- Location within York
- Coordinates: 53.961°N 1.083°W
- South West end: St Helen's Square
- Major junctions: Little Stonegate
- North East end: Petergate; Minster Gates

Stonegate is a street in the city centre of York, England, one of the streets most visited by tourists. Most of the buildings along the street are listed, meaning they are of national importance due to their architecture or history.

== History ==
The street roughly follows the line of the via praetoria of Eboracum, the Roman city, which ran between what are now St Helen's Square and York Minster.

The street appears to have lost importance in the Anglian and Jorvik period. York Minster was rebuilt in the 11th century, and stone for it was brought up the road, from a quay behind what is now York Guildhall. This appears to have brought the street back to prominence, and new building plots were laid adjoining the north-eastern part of the street. This part of the street lay in the Liberty of St Peter's, associated with the Minster, and many of its buildings belonged to the church, the whole area soon becoming built up, mostly with tenements. By 1215, there were houses for the prebends of Ampleforth, Barnby, Bramham and North Newbald.

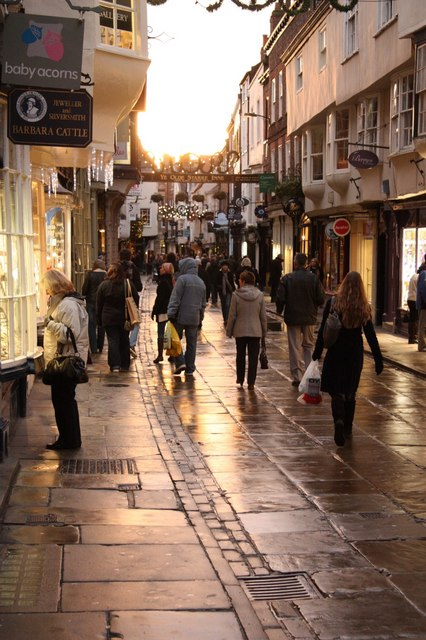
Looking north-east on Stonegate

The street was known as "Stonegate" by 1119. (The stone pavement that exists today appears in photographs from the 1970s, and earlier photos dating back to the 1880s show the street having cobblestones.) Sir Francis Drake writes in his 1736 book Eboracum that the street name was, "...given as is said from the vast quantity of stone lead through this street for the building of the cathedral."

Glass painters and goldsmiths became prominent along the road, while from the 1500s, it became known for printers and bookshops. In 1762, John Todd set up a well-known library and bookshop on the street.

Because of the location of the street, it has historically been used for civic processions, from the York Guildhall to the Minster. It was also the site where three of the historic York Mystery Plays were performed. In 1570, Guy Fawkes was born at a house on the street.

Nikolaus Pevsner described the street as "perhaps the most attractive [street in the city], and one of the busiest. Narrow, quite long, and with a variety of good things". Due to its popularity with tourists, the street was pedestrianised in 1974. It was repaved in York stone in 2020.

== Architecture and layout ==
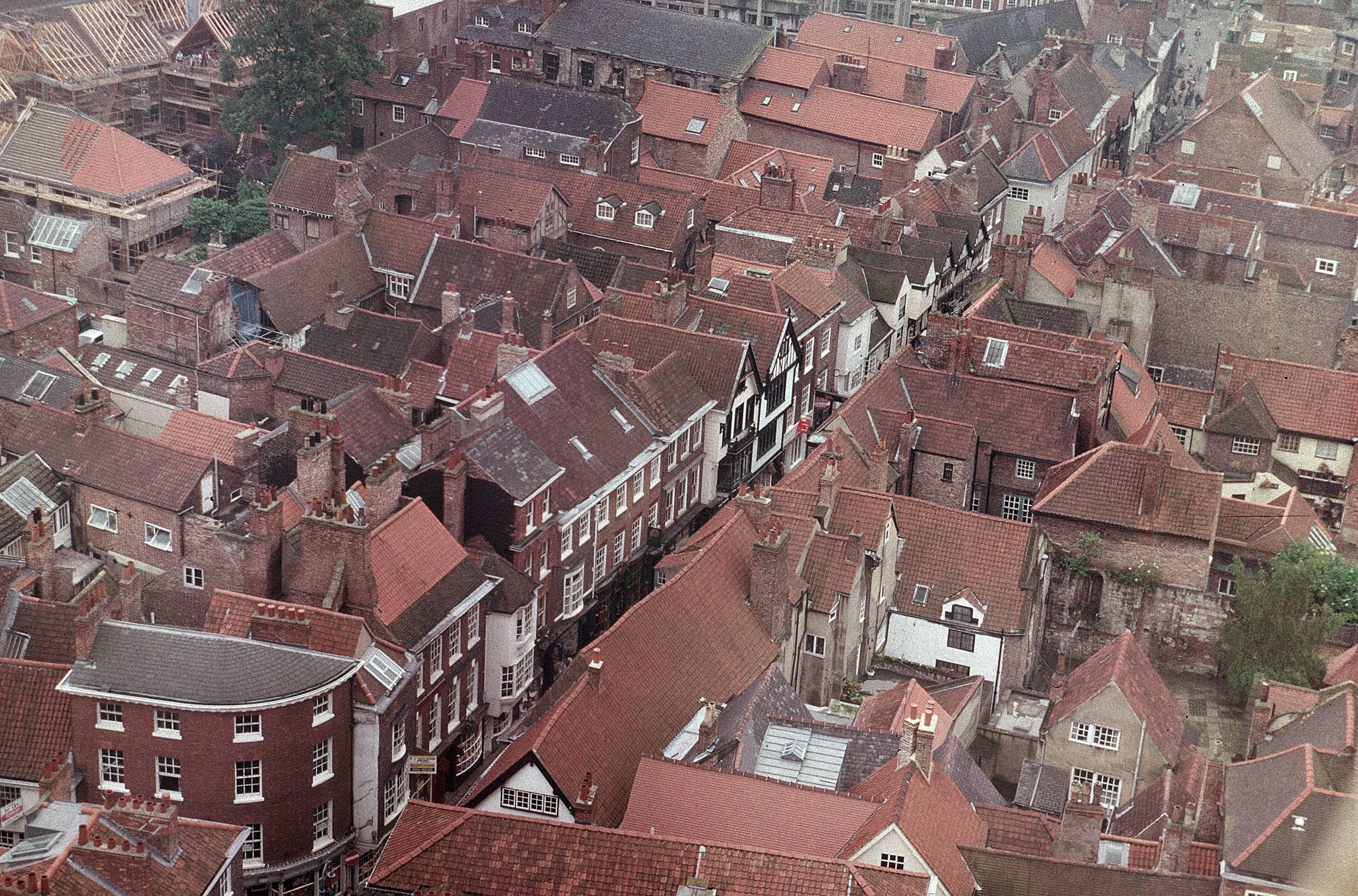
Aerial view of Stonegate, looking south-west, in 1991

The street runs north-east from St Helen's Square to the junction of High and Low Petergate, beyond which its continuation is Minster Gates. Before 1745, it started slightly further south-west, at a junction with Coney Street and Davygate, so St Helen's, Stonegate was actually accessed from the street. Various yards lead off its north-western side, while Little Stonegate and the snickleway Coffee Yard lead off its south-eastern side.

Most of the buildings along the street are listed. Among the most notable on the north-west side are Nos. 54, 56 and 58, 14th-century timber-framed buildings; the 12th-century Norman House, in a courtyard off the road; Nos. 44 and 46, Nos. 48 and 50, and No. 52, each with 15th-century origins; Ye Olde Starre Inne in a courtyard at No. 40, the oldest continuously operating pub in the city, with a sign which has spanned the road since 1733; Nos. 12 to 14, in part dating from the 14th century; and the early 17th-century Nos. 4 and 4A and No. 8.

On the south-east side lie The Punch Bowl at No. 7, a pub which opened as a coffee house in 1675 and was rebuilt in 1931; the 18th-century Nos. 9, 9A and 11; 15th-century No. 13; mid-18th-century No. 15; the 15th-century Mulberry Hall at Nos. 17 and 19; the 15th‑century Nos. 21 and 25, No. 35 and No. 43; the 18th-century Nos. 45 and 47; early 17th-century No. 49; and 19th-century No. 51. There are also the headquarters of the York Medical Society, accessed by an alleyway; 17th-century buildings at No. 31 and No. 33; and No. 37 with an early 19th-century shopfront.
