= Abraham Moon & Sons =

English fashion brand

- Type: Private
- Industry: Fashion
- Founded: 1837; 189 years ago
- Headquarters: Leeds, England
- Key people: John Walsh (managing director)
- Products: Clothing
- Website: www.moons.co.uk

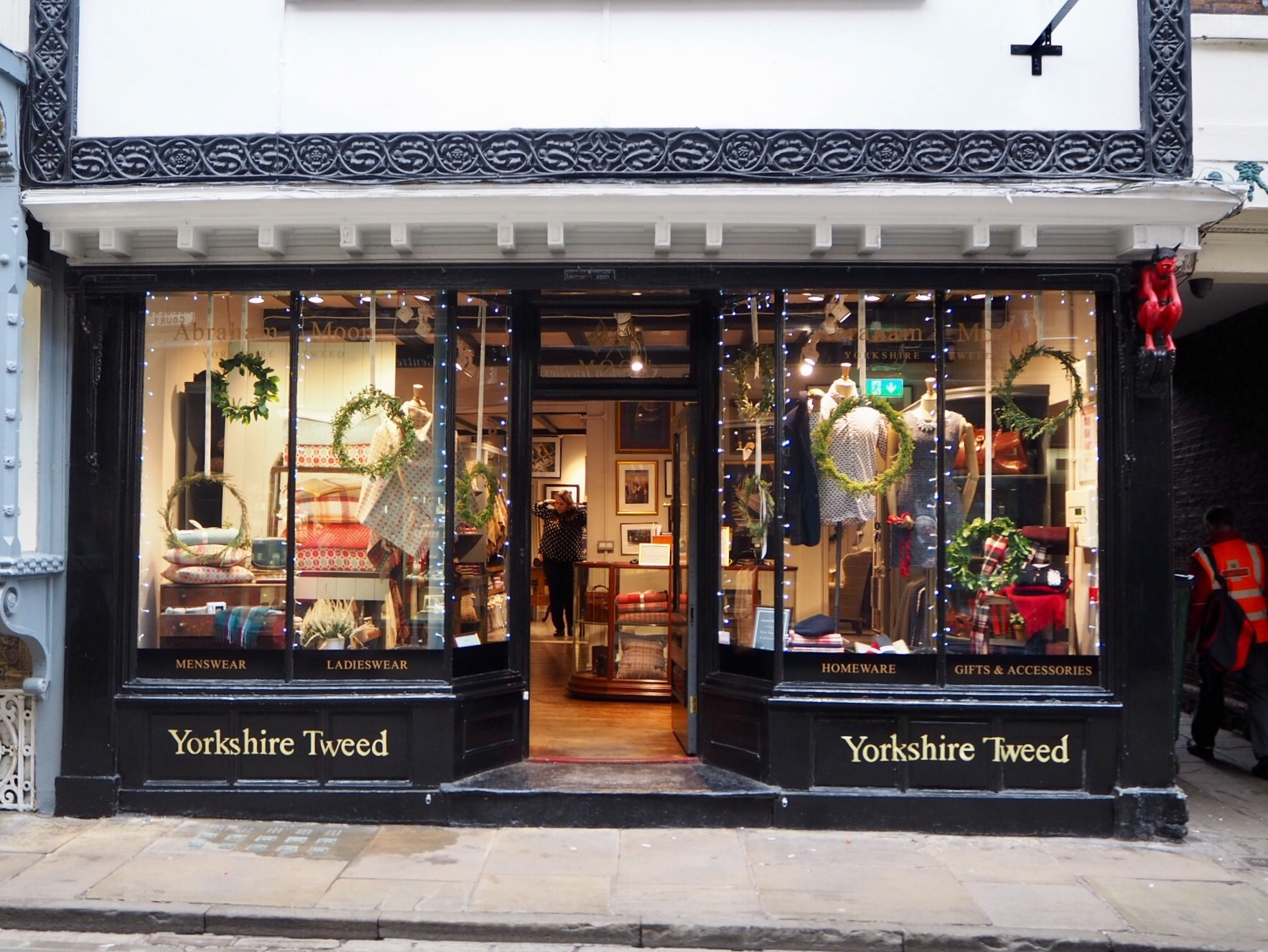
An Abraham Moon store in Stonegate, York

Abraham Moon & Sons is a British fashion brand, specializing in wool and tweed clothing.

== History ==
Abraham Moon founded the business in 1837 in Guiseley, West Yorkshire. His son Isaac took over when Abraham died in an accident in 1877. Isaac constructed a new mill when a fire destroyed the original structure in 1902. In 1920, Charles H Walsh purchased the company, however he died in 1924 and the business passed to his son Frank. The Walsh family still owns and operates the business.

The company is one of Yorkshire's oldest clothing brands still in operation. The brand has a flagship shop at 33 Stonegate in York.
