= 43 Stonegate =

Listed building in York, England

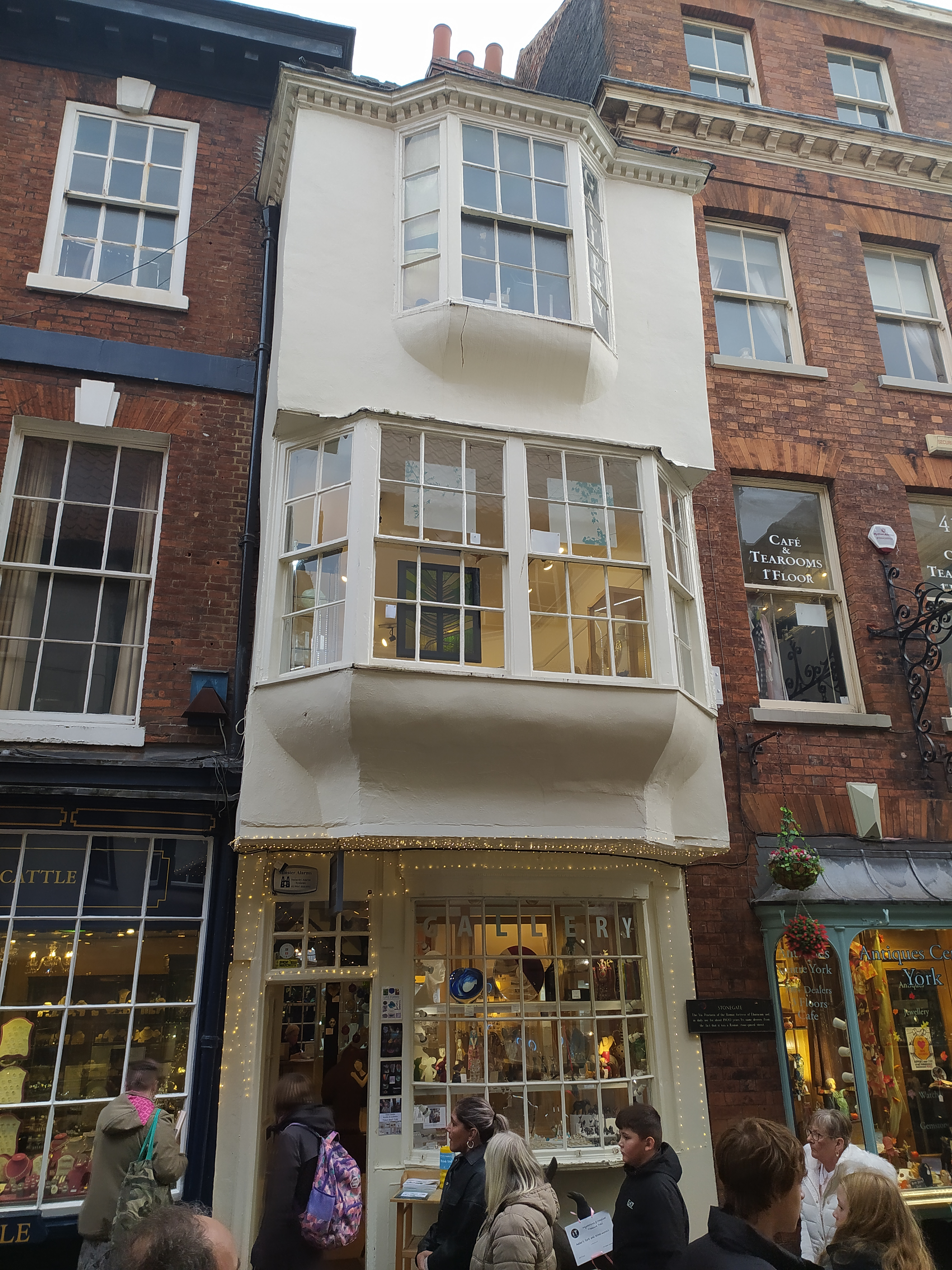
- The building in 2021
- Interactive map of the 43 Stonegate area

General information
- Location: Stonegate, York, England
- Coordinates: 53°57′41″N 1°04′57″W
- Year built: 15th century (probable)
- Renovated: Late 17th century (remodelled); Late 18th century (refronted and re-roofed); 20th century (shopfront)

Technical details
- Floor count: 3 + cellar

Design and construction
- Designations

Listed Building – Grade II*
- Official name: 43, Stonegate
- Designated: 14 June 1954
- Reference no.: 1256487

43 Stonegate is a historic, Grade II* listed building in the city centre of York, England.

The building lies on Stonegate, one of the most historic streets in the city, and stands between Grade II-listed No. 41, and Nos. 45 and 47, which are listed at Grade II*. No. 43 was probably constructed in the 15th century. The building was remodelled in the 17th century, and the front and roof were replaced in the late 18th century. At the time, it was the White Dog pub, which by the mid-19th century had become the White Hart Inn. Since 1991, it has housed the Pyramid Gallery.

The building is timber-framed and has three storeys and a cellar. Both of the upper storeys are jettied. There is a shop window at ground floor level, while the upper floors have bay windows. The rear wall is of 18th-century brick. Inside, there is a historic cooking range in the cellar, in a stone fireplace. The main staircase is also historic, while on the second floor there is part of a frieze and several 17th-century doors.

== See also ==
- Grade II* listed buildings in the City of York
- Listed buildings in York (within the city walls, northern part)
