= Mulberry Hall =

Listed building in York, England

- The building in 2023

General information
- Location: Stonegate, York, England
- Coordinates: 53°57′39″N 1°05′00″W
- Year built: 15th century
- Renovated: Late 16th century (raised, extended and wing added); 20th century (restored)

Technical details
- Floor count: 3

Design and construction
- Designations

Listed Building – Grade II*
- Official name: Mulberry Hall
- Designated: 14 June 1954
- Reference no.: 1256512

Mulberry Hall is a Grade II* listed building on Stonegate in the city centre of York, England.

Stonegate has been an important street for many centuries, and a Mulberry Hall existed on the site by 1372, housing the prebend of North Newbald. In the mid-15th century, the house was demolished and a new one built. Some modern sources give the date of rebuilding as 1434, and this date is now painted onto the building. The new structure was a two-storey timber-framed building, running from the corner of Stonegate and Little Stonegate, and stretching along Stonegate to cover three building plots.

In about 1574, a third storey was added to the building. The whole structure was widened to the rear, by a few feet, and a new two-storey wing added to the rear of this, with a large kitchen on the ground floor. In the 18th century, the part of the building next to Little Stonegate was rebuilt, and has since been a separate structure, 15 Stonegate. The remainder was divided into two tenements with shops below.

In the 1950s, the whole remaining part of the house was converted into a single large shop, a china and glass retailer also named Mulberry Hall. This closed in 2016, since when it has been occupied by the first UK branch of Käthe Wohlfahrt, a year-round Christmas shop.

Although the building has been heavily altered over the years, it retains a jettied front with exposed timber-framing, and original 16th and 17th-century windows on the upper floors. One window frame was formerly inscribed with the date "1574", although this is no longer visible. To the rear, part of the structure is timber-framed and jettied, although the north-east bay was rebuilt in brick in about 1700. The first floor has extensive 17th-century wood panelling, and there is also a staircase dating from about 1700. The building is owned by the Sinclair family, a well known York family.

== See also ==
- Grade II* listed buildings in the City of York
- Listed buildings in York (within the city walls, northern part)
