= 37–39 Low Petergate and 51 Stonegate =

Listed building in York, England

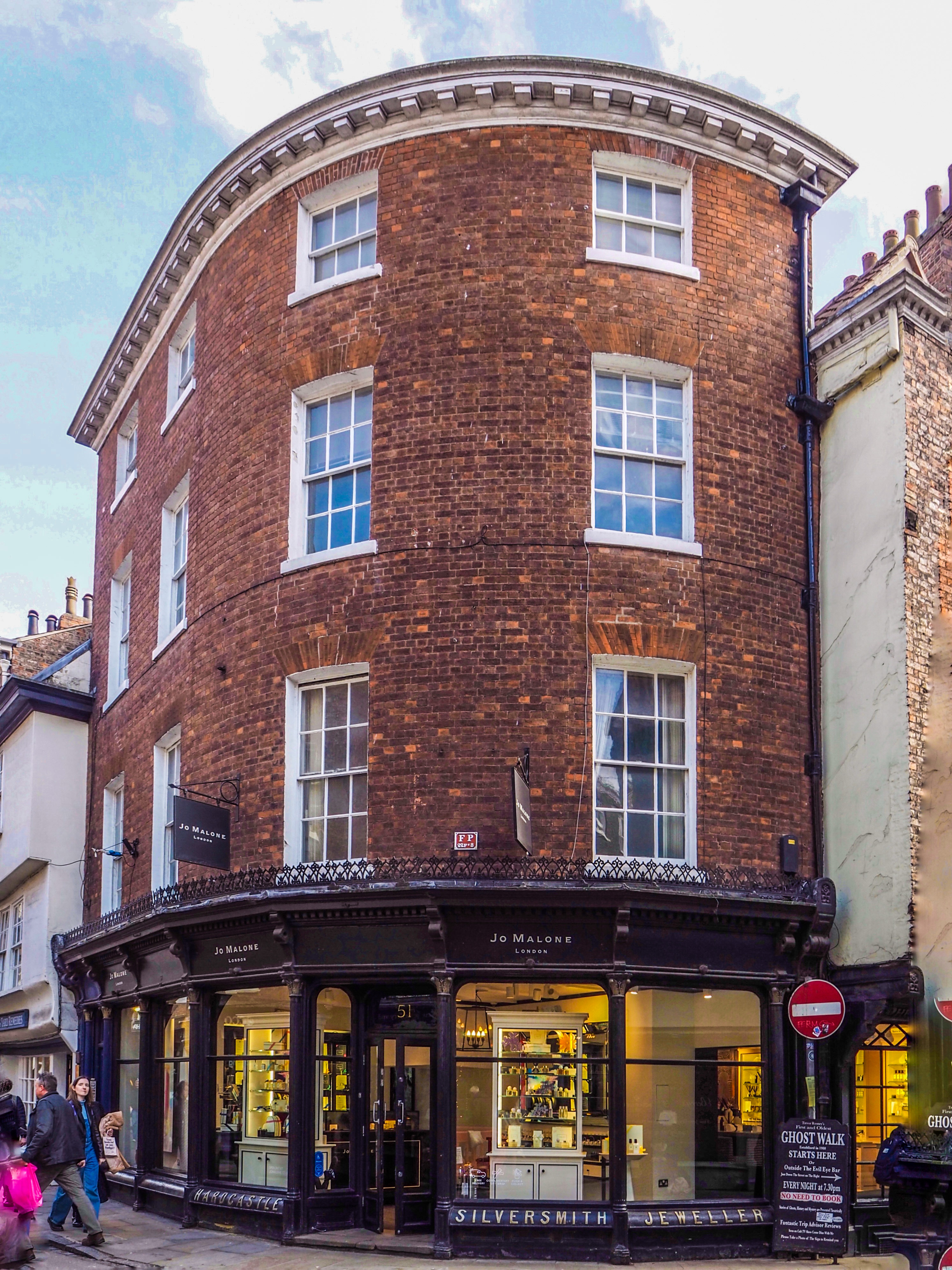
- The building in 2023
- Interactive map of the 37–39 Low Petergate and 51 Stonegate area

General information
- Location: Low Petergate and Stonegate, York, England
- Coordinates: 53.961414758°N 1.082356108°W
- Completed: 1828 (198 years ago)
- Renovated: Late 19th century (shopfront)

Listed Building – Grade II
- Official name: 51, Stonegate, 37 and 39, Low Petergate
- Designated: 1 July 1968
- Reference no.: 1257453

37–39 Low Petergate and 51 Stonegate is a building in York, England. Listed at Grade II since 1968, it stands at the junction of Low Petergate and Stonegate. Completed in 1828, it is flanked by 41–43 Low Petergate and 49 Stonegate, and stands at the foot of Minster Gates.

The building housed Henry Hardcastle's silversmith and jewellery business in the early 20th century. The name Hardcastle Silversmith Jeweller remains engraved across three of the windowsills today.

== Architecture ==
The front is built in red brick with a timber cornice, a timber shopfront carried on cast‑iron columns, and a slate roof with a brick chimney.

The elevation is four storeys and four bays, set on a gentle curve. The shopfront has panelled pilasters, a broad fascia and a dentilled, brattished cornice on shaped brackets. It includes plate‑glass windows with transoms, a glazed corner door with an overlight, and a glazed and panelled upper‑floor door at the left, divided by fluted columns. The window sills are concave and show the painted lettering for "Hardcastle Silversmith and Jeweller". Above, the first and second floors have tall and then standard 12‑pane sashes, and the top floor has short six‑pane sashes, all on painted stone sills with flat gauged‑brick heads.

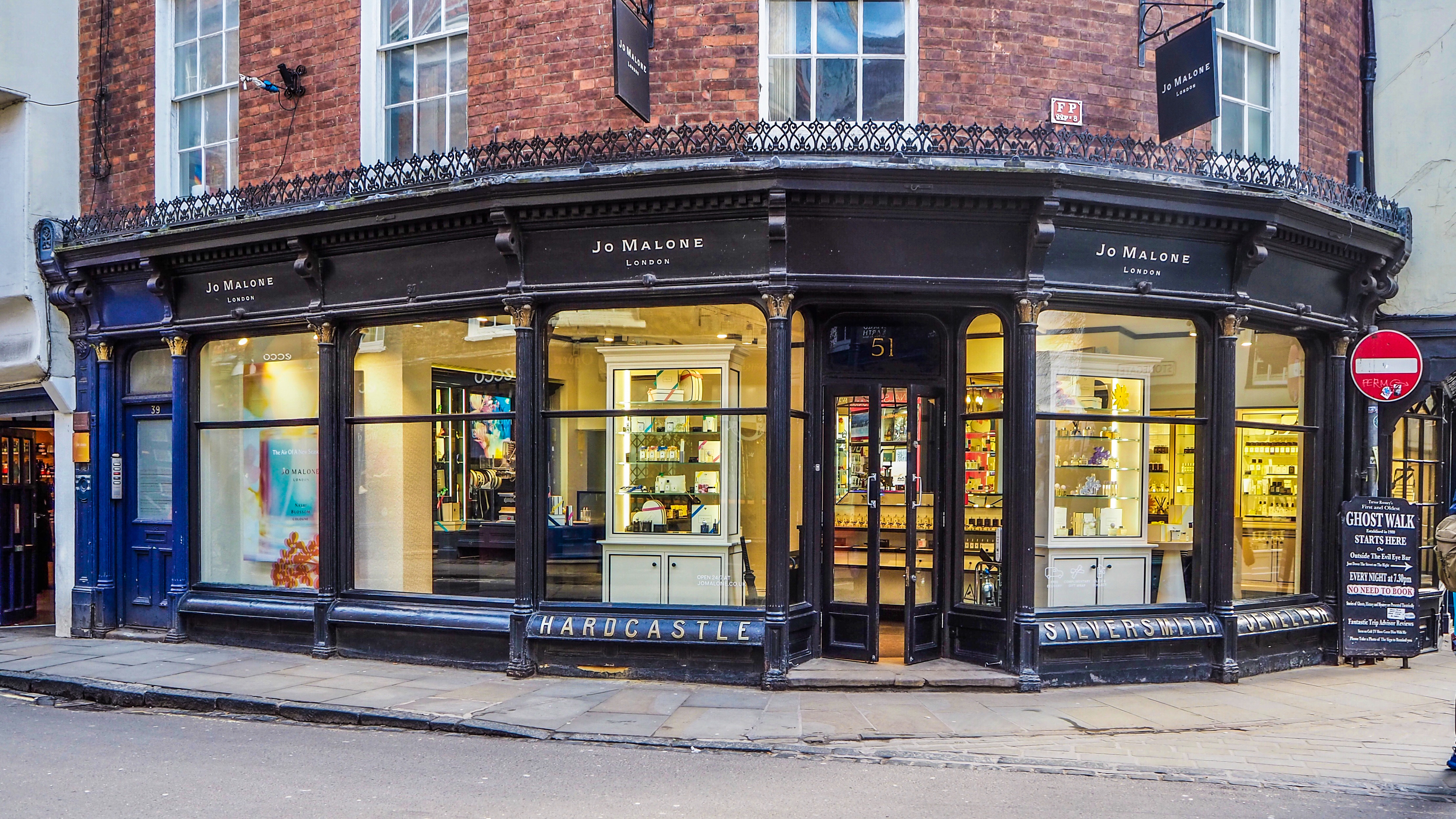
The section on the left is on Low Petergate

== See also ==
- Listed buildings in York (within the city walls, northern part)
