= 33 Stonegate =

Listed building in York, England

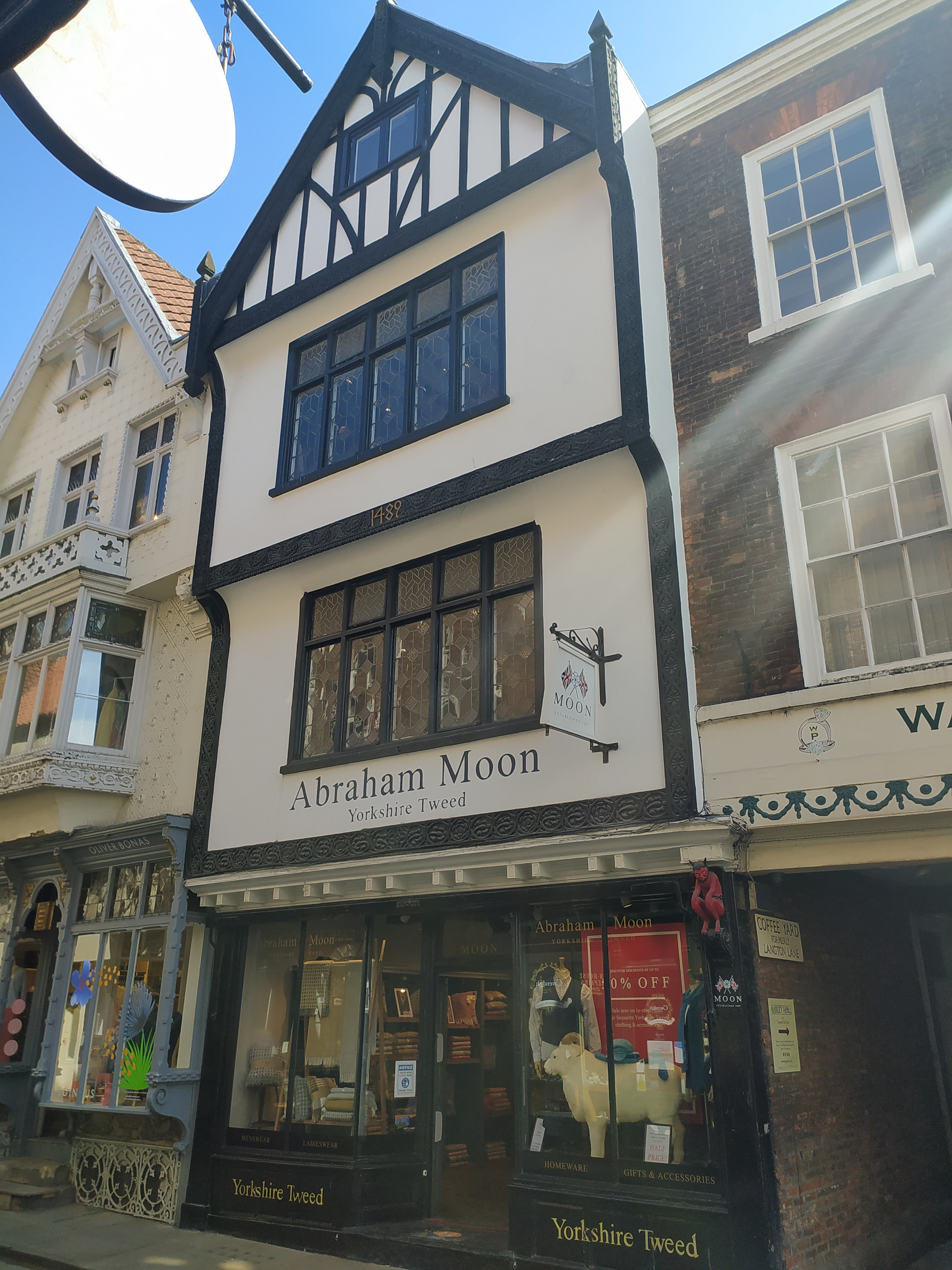
- The building in 2021
- Interactive map of the 33 Stonegate area

General information
- Status: Converted to retail use
- Type: House (former)
- Location: Stonegate, York, England
- Coordinates: 53.961068°N 1.082923°W
- Completed: Early 17th century
- Renovated: Late 17th century (altered, rear extended); Late 19th century (altered)

Technical details
- Floor count: 3 + attic

Design and construction
- Designations

Listed Building – Grade II*
- Official name: 33, Stonegate
- Designated: 14 June 1954
- Reference no.: 1256522

33 Stonegate is a historic building in the city centre of York, England.

The timber-framed building was constructed in the early 17th century, probably at the same time as the similar building at No. 31. Late in the century, it was extended to the rear, in brick. The front was originally pargetted, but this was removed in the late 19th century and replaced by plain plaster with elaborately carved wood. This incorporates the date "1489", but this does not relate to any event in the history of the site.

The building has three storeys and an attic, each of which is jettied. The ground floor has a shopfront, and at its right hand end is a bracket supporting a carving of the devil. The devil is believed to have advertised a printing business in the building, a "printer's devil" being a nickname for a printer's assistant. Inside, a late 17th-century staircase rises the height of the building. Several original doors survive, as does the panelling in the front room on the first floor.

The building was Grade II* listed in 1954. Since 2017, it has housed the flagship shop of Abraham Moon & Sons, a woollen mill based in Guiseley, West Yorkshire.

A local story states that Laurence Sterne lived at the house for several years, and he would frighten off potential thieves by banging his walking stick against his bedroom wall, a sound which can supposedly still be heard in neighbouring No. 35.

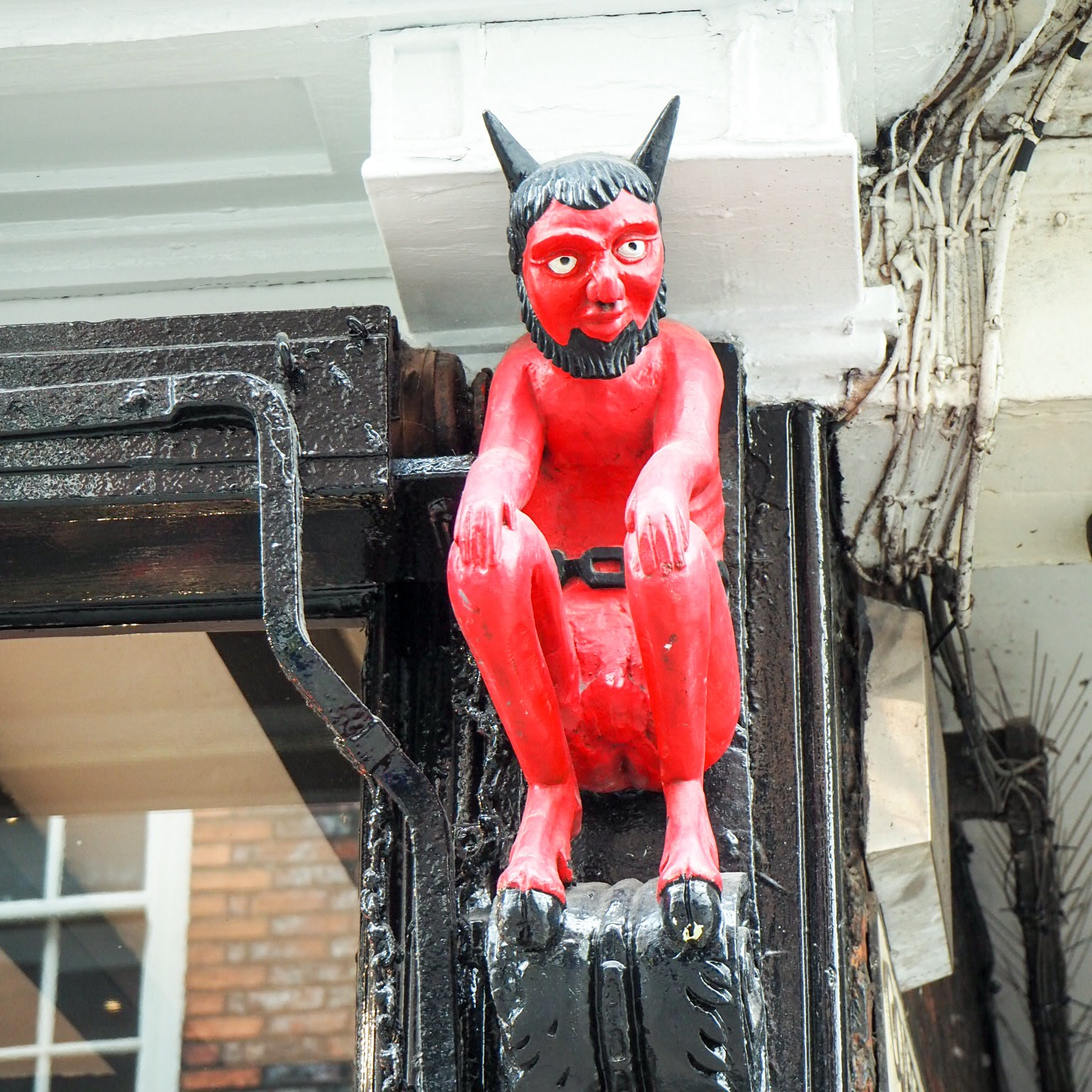
The devil in 2018

== See also ==
- Grade II* listed buildings in the City of York
- Listed buildings in York (within the city walls, northern part)
