= 15 Stonegate =

Listed building in York, England

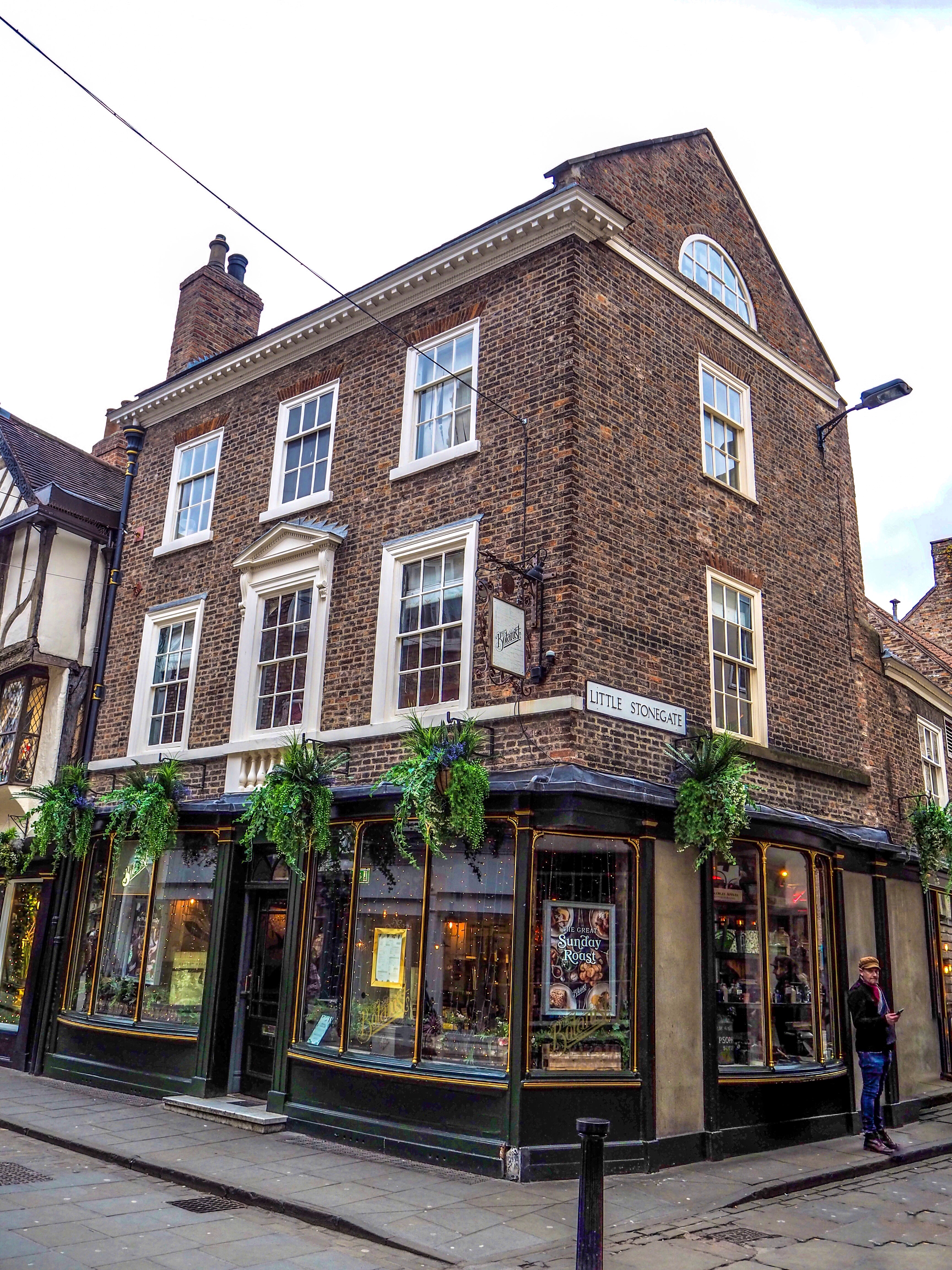
- The building in 2023
- Interactive map of the 15 Stonegate area
- Former names: King's Head; 12 Stonegate

General information
- Type: House (formerly stable with loft above; later inn), now a bar and restaurant
- Location: Stonegate, York, England
- Coordinates: 53°57′39″N 1°05′01″W
- Year built: Mid-18th century
- Renovated: Early 19th century (converted); Late 20th century (restored, shopfront renewed)

Design and construction
- Main contractor: William Fleming (probable)
- Designations

Listed Building – Grade II*
- Official name: 15, Stonegate
- Designated: 14 June 1954
- Reference no.: 1256510

Website
- Official website

15 Stonegate is a Grade II* listed building on Stonegate in the city of York, England. It incorporates fabric from two timber‑framed structures of probable 15th‑century date, thought to have formed part of the earlier buildings at Nos. 17–19, now Mulberry Hall. The building was altered and cased in brick in the mid‑18th century, and has had a range of later uses, including as the King's Head inn. It was restored in the late 20th century when the shopfront was renewed, and was formerly known as 12 Stonegate. It is now occupied by The Botanist York bar and restaurant.

== History ==
The building stands on Stonegate and incorporates parts of two timber‑framed structures of probable 15th‑century date, thought to have formed part of the earlier buildings at Nos. 17–19, now Mulberry Hall. These were later altered and cased in brick in the mid‑18th century, likely by the bricklayer William Fleming. Among its recorded uses, the building served as a stable with a loft above before being converted into a dwelling house, and at one time operated as the King's Head inn. It was restored in the late 20th century when the shopfront was renewed. It was also formerly known as 12 Stonegate, although the date at which this numbering was applied is unclear.

On 14 June 1954, No. 15 was designated a Grade II* listed building, and in 1968 the site was included within the newly established Central Historic Core conservation area. No. 15 is now occupied by The Botanist York bar and restaurant. It adjoins Mulberry Hall on its Stonegate side, while No. 13 lies across the entrance to Little Stonegate.

== Architecture ==
The building has an orange‑brown brick exterior with simple painted stone details, a timber shopfront and a plain tiled roof. The right side of the ground floor is rendered, and the roof has stone-edged gables and brick chimneys.

The front has three storeys and three bays. The shopfront includes pilasters and a shaped cornice, with a margin‑glazed, panelled door beneath a decorative fanlight, flanked by bow windows. On the first floor are sash windows in shaped surrounds, the centre one highlighted by a small pediment and a balustraded panel beneath. The second floor has smaller sash windows, with the centre opening blind. A dentilled cornice runs across the top, with a shaped rainwater head at the left end.

The right-hand side has three storeys and an attic, with the gable of the main range next to a lower two‑storey wing. Both parts repeat the shopfront design from the main elevation. The gable wall has sash windows on the first and second floors and a small round attic window. The wing has sash windows on the first floor.

=== Interior ===
Inside, a dragon beam from an earlier building survives in the front room on the ground floor. The front room on the first floor has a ceiling with moulded beams and a dentilled cornice, and contains a plain fireplace.

== See also ==
- Grade II* listed buildings in the City of York
- Listed buildings in York (within the city walls, northern part)
