= 44 and 46 Stonegate =

Listed building in York, England

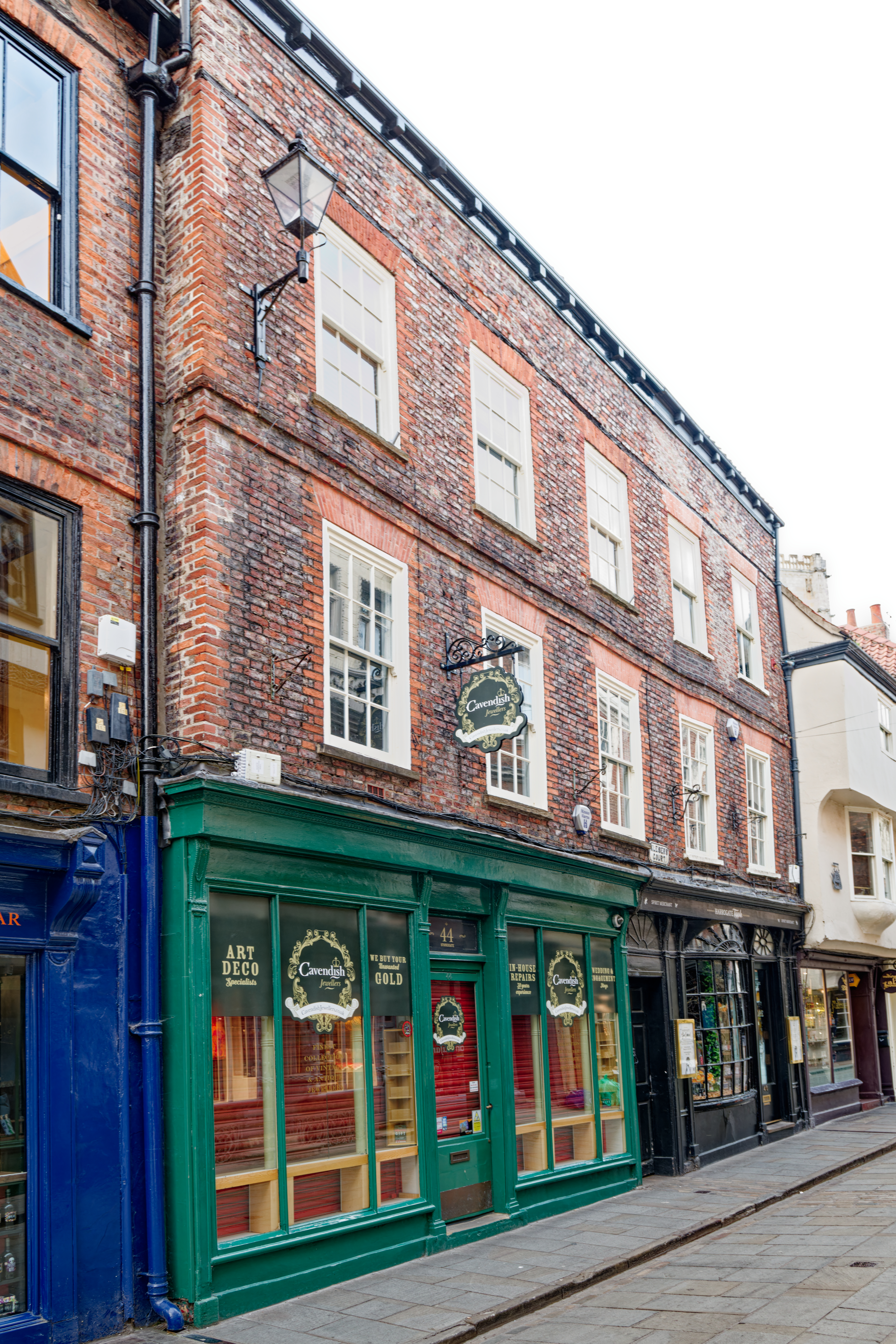
- The building in 2024
- Interactive map of the 44 and 46 Stonegate area
- Former names: 38 and 39 Stonegate

General information
- Type: Houses, now in commercial and pub use
- Location: Stonegate, York, England
- Coordinates: 53°57′40″N 1°04′59″W
- Year built: 15th century
- Renovated: Mid-18th century (refronted); Early 19th century (shopfronts); Mid-19th century (raised); 20th century (No. 46 extended)

Design and construction
- Designations

Listed Building – Grade II*
- Official name: 44 and 46, Stonegate
- Designated: 14 June 1954
- Reference no.: 1256488

44 and 46 Stonegate is a Grade II* listed building on Stonegate in the city of York, England. The pair originated as medieval houses and were altered over several centuries. They were added to the Central Historic Core conservation area in 1968. The buildings stand between No. 42 (Grade II) and Nos. 48–50 (Grade II*), with No. 44 occupied by Cavendish Jewellers and No. 46 serving as the premises of the Little Ale House.

== History ==
The buildings began as medieval houses and were later adapted for commercial use. Their front range dates from the 15th century and was altered and heightened in the 18th and 19th centuries, while the rear of No. 44 retains earlier fabric linked to the main range during later rebuilding. No. 46 was expanded in stages, with further additions made in the 18th and 20th centuries, and both properties received early 19th‑century shopfronts that were subsequently modified. It was formerly known as 38 and 39 Stonegate.

On 14 June 1954, Nos. 44–46 were designated a Grade II* listed building, and in 1968 the site was included within the newly established Central Historic Core conservation area. It stands between No. 42, listed at Grade II, and Nos. 48–50, also listed at Grade II*. No. 44 is now occupied by Cavendish Jewellers and No. 46 serves as the premises of the Little Ale House.

== Architecture ==
The front and rear parts of the building are timber‑framed and later faced in brick, with pantile roofs and brick chimneys. The street front is three storeys and five bays wide, with two shopfronts set between panelled pilasters and a decorative cornice. No. 44 has a glazed door between wide plate‑glass windows, while No. 46 has a shallow bow window, a glazed shop door and a separate passage entrance. The upper floors have sash windows, mostly with 12 panes, set beneath flat brick arches. A central passage leads to a small courtyard enclosed by the rear wings. Behind No. 44 is a two‑storey brick range with a tripartite window and a later Venetian window above, and behind No. 46 is a taller gabled wing with further brick detailing and later windows.

=== Interior ===
The interiors retain a number of period features. No. 44 has a staircase rising to the second floor with turned balusters and a heavy handrail, and the landings keep panelled doors. Its ground‑floor middle room contains a decorated fireplace, while the first‑floor rooms have moulded beams, enriched fireplaces and reused panelling, with the rear room preserving carved joinery with leaf and rosette motifs. No. 46 has a staircase running from the ground floor to the attic with turned balusters and square newels, and some timber framing is visible on the second floor. The first‑floor front room includes an ornamented fireplace and reeded door surrounds, and the second‑floor front room retains a blocked 18th‑century fireplace and a panelled cupboard door.

== See also ==
- Grade II* listed buildings in the City of York
- Listed buildings in York (within the city walls, northern part)
