= 31 Stonegate =

Listed building in York, England

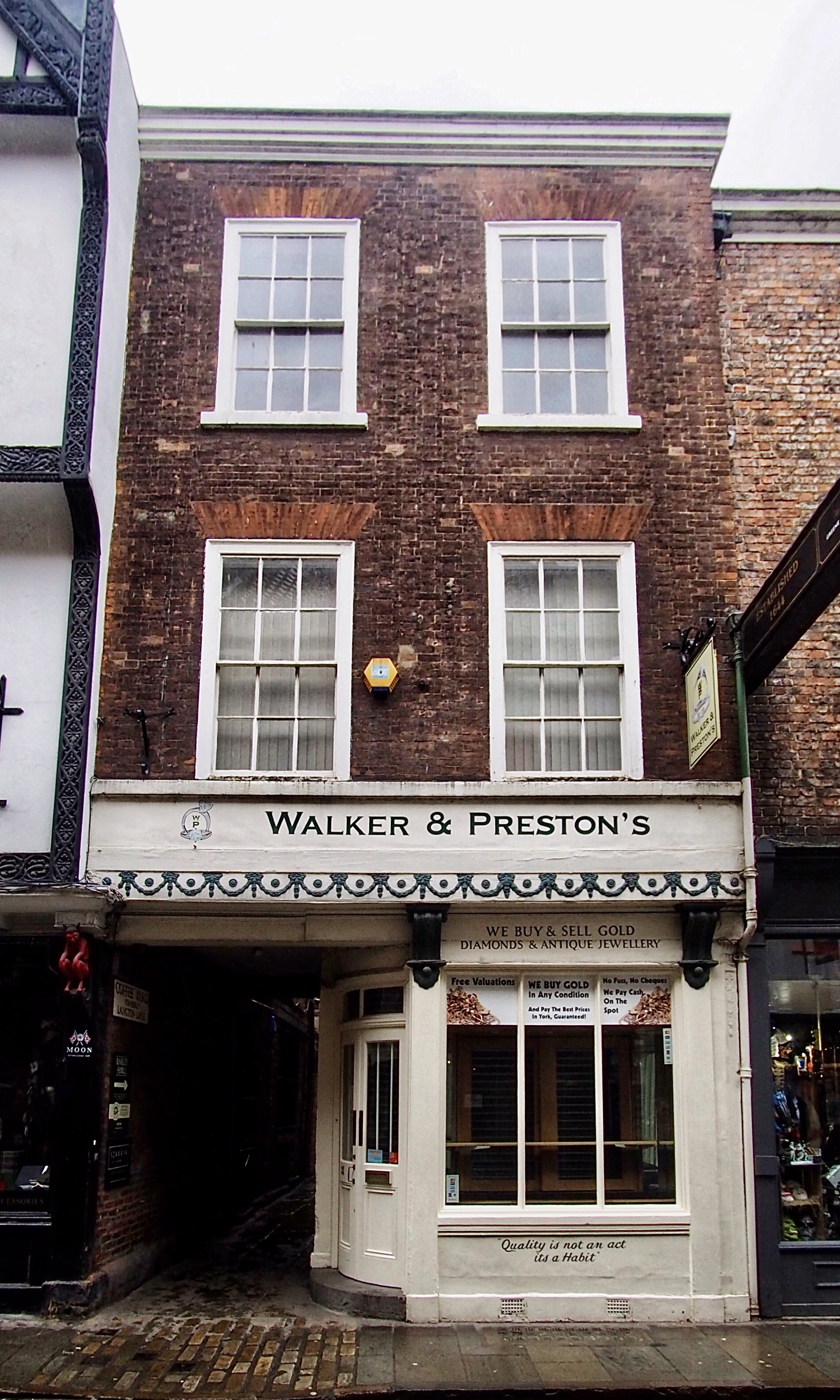
- The building in 2023
- Interactive map of the 31 Stonegate area
- Former names: 21 Stonegate; Briggs' Coffee House; Saracen's Head Coffee House; Saracen's Head Inn

General information
- Type: House and shop, later coffee house and inn; now in commercial use
- Location: Stonegate, York, England
- Coordinates: 53°57′40″N 1°04′59″W
- Year built: Late 17th century
- Renovated: Late 18th century (refronted); Mid-19th century (shopfront altered); 20th century (altered, converted)

Design and construction
- Designations

Listed Building – Grade II*
- Official name: 31, Stonegate
- Designated: 14 June 1954
- Reference no.: 1256520

31 Stonegate is a Grade II* listed building on Stonegate in the city of York, England. Dating from the late 17th century, it was built as a house and a shop and later adapted for commercial use, with alterations made in the 18th and 19th centuries. The building was included in the Central Historic Core conservation area in 1968. It is now occupied by Walker & Preston's jewellers with offices above and stands next to the early-17th-century No. 33.

== History ==
The building stands on Stonegate and was originally a house. It dates from the late 17th century, was given a new front in the late 18th century, and had its shopfront altered in the mid‑19th century. In the late 18th century the house was owned by John and William Staveley, who were carvers and gilders. It was known as Briggs' Coffee House in the 18th century, became the Saracen's Head Coffee House by 1815, and later in the 19th century was referred to as the Saracen's Head Inn. In the 20th century it was altered and converted into a shop. It was also formerly known as 21 Stonegate, although the date at which this numbering was applied is unclear.

On 14 June 1954, No. 31 was designated a Grade II* listed building, and in 1968 the site was included within the newly established Central Historic Core conservation area. No. 31 is now occupied by Walker & Preston's jewellers with offices above. It stands between No. 29, built in around 1840, and the early-17th-century No. 33.

== Architecture ==
The front is built of orange brick, with the ground floor finished in painted render. The left side is of orange‑red brick on a chamfered brick base, and the rear is rendered. The roof is partly hipped and covered with pantiles, with a timber eaves cornice and a brick chimney.

The building has three storeys and two windows on the front. The shopfront includes an open passageway under a flat lintel, leading to Coffee Yard. At the corner of the passage are curved glazed double doors with sunk panels, set to the left of a three‑light window with moulded mullions. The window is framed by plain pilasters with large scrolled brackets and pendants at the top, beneath a full‑width cornice decorated with rosettes, festoons and drops. The first and second‑floor windows are 12‑pane sashes with flat brick arches; those on the first floor have a painted sill band, and those on the second floor have painted sills. A moulded cornice runs along the eaves.

=== Interior ===
Inside, the cellar retains a fireplace fitted with a mid‑19th‑century kitchen range. On the ground floor, an open‑well staircase rises to the attic; it has a heavy moulded closed string, bulbous balusters, square newels with attached half‑balusters and pendants, and a substantial moulded handrail that ends in volutes at the foot.

On the first floor, the landing has a cupboard door with two raised and fielded panels and drawers beneath. The front room has window and door surrounds richly decorated with composition mouldings, including ribbon and floral motifs and fretwork with rosettes. Its fireplace has jambs carved with satyrs' heads, vines and grapes, and a frieze of scrolling foliage with Bacchus in the centre panel. The skirting is moulded, and the dado rail is enriched with fluting and paterae. The rear room has a six‑panel door and a blocked fireplace with bolection moulding.

On the second floor, doors with two moulded panels in beaded surrounds lead from the landing into both rooms. The front room has a boarded corner fireplace with a frieze of ribbons, festoons and paterae, and a moulded cornice shelf. The back room has a plain fireplace with a hob grate and a simple plank cupboard door. In the attic, two two‑panel doors remain.

== See also ==
- Grade II* listed buildings in the City of York
- Listed buildings in York (within the city walls, northern part)
