= Ye Olde Starre Inne =

Listed pub in York, England

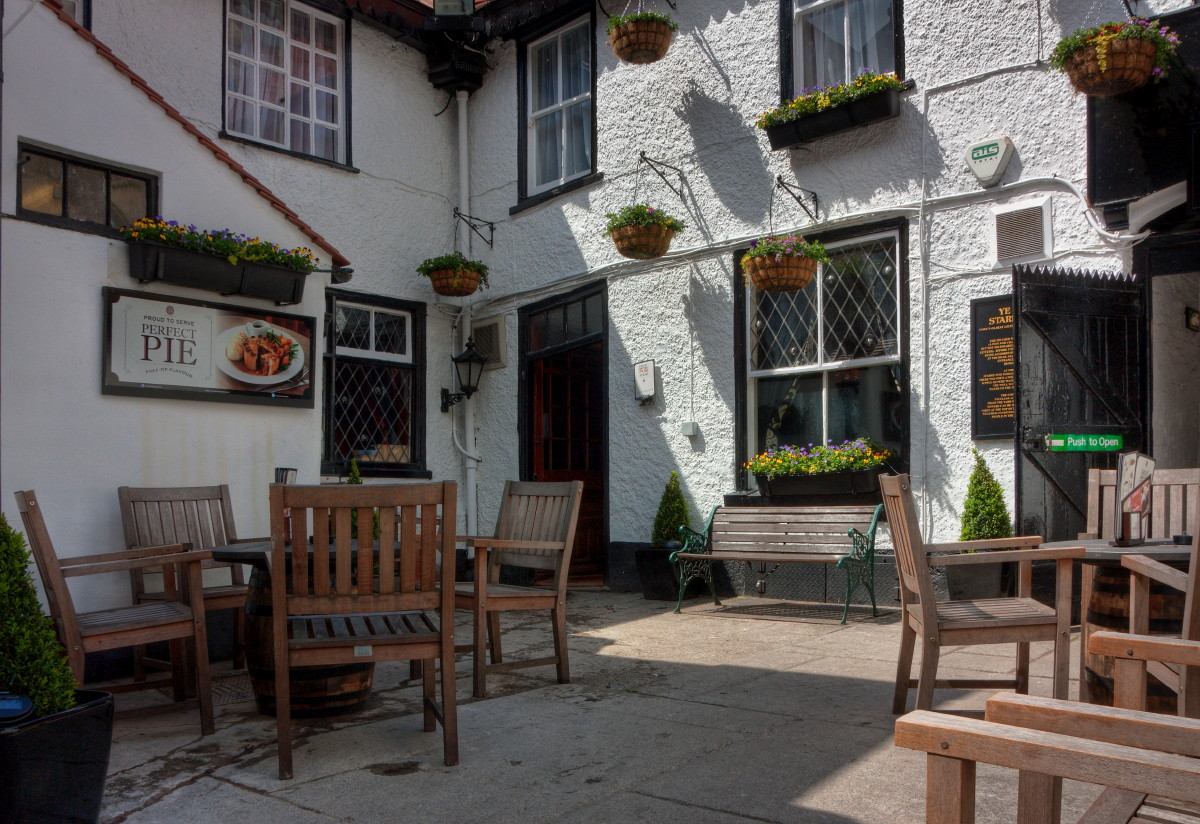
- The pub in 2013
- Former names: The Starre; Boddy's Inn

General information
- Type: Public house
- Location: 40 Stonegate, York, England
- Coordinates: 53°57′41″N 1°05′01″W
- Year built: 16th century
- Renovated: Early 17th century (wing added); Early 18th and late 19th century (extended) c. 1890 and 1985 (refurbished)
- Owner: Greene King

Design and construction
- Designations

Listed Building – Grade II
- Official name: Ye Olde Starre Inne
- Designated: 14 June 1954
- Reference no.: 1256484

Website
- Official website

Ye Olde Starre Inne is a historic public house on Stonegate in the city centre of York, England. The main block of the pub is a timber-framed structure, constructed in the 16th century, and a wing to its left was added in about 1600. By 1644, it was an inn named "The Starre", the buildings lying at the back of a coaching yard, off the north side of the street. This makes it the pub in York which can demonstrate the earliest date for its licence. After the Battle of Marston Moor the inn was used as a hospital for wounded soldiers.

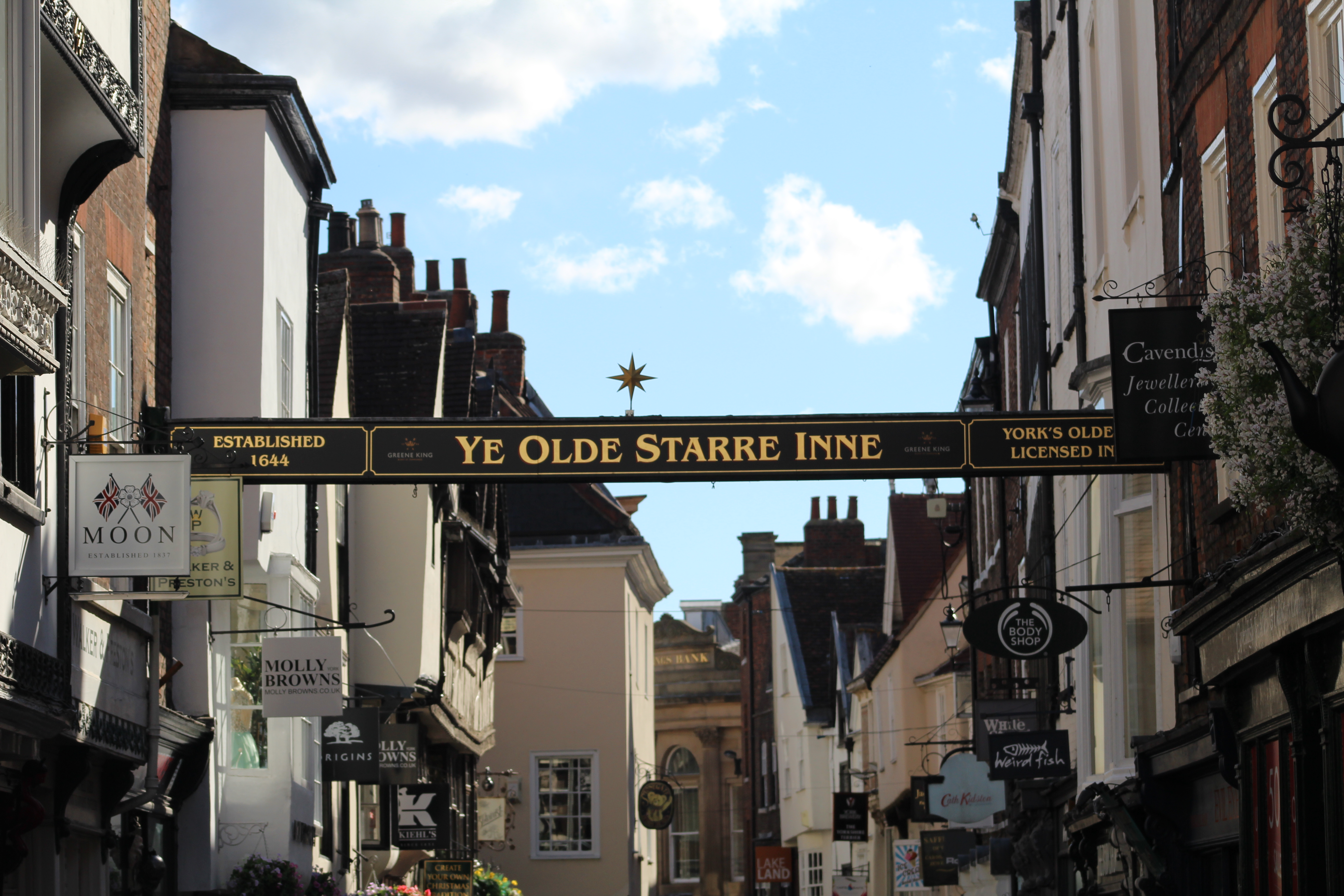
Pub sign across Stonegate

In 1662, the pub was sold for £250, and in 1683, Edward Thompson inherited it. In 1733, the pub's landlord was Thomas Bulman, and he signed an agreement with the owners of two shops on Stonegate that he could attach a sign to their premises, to hang across the street. A sign advertising the pub has hung across the street ever since.

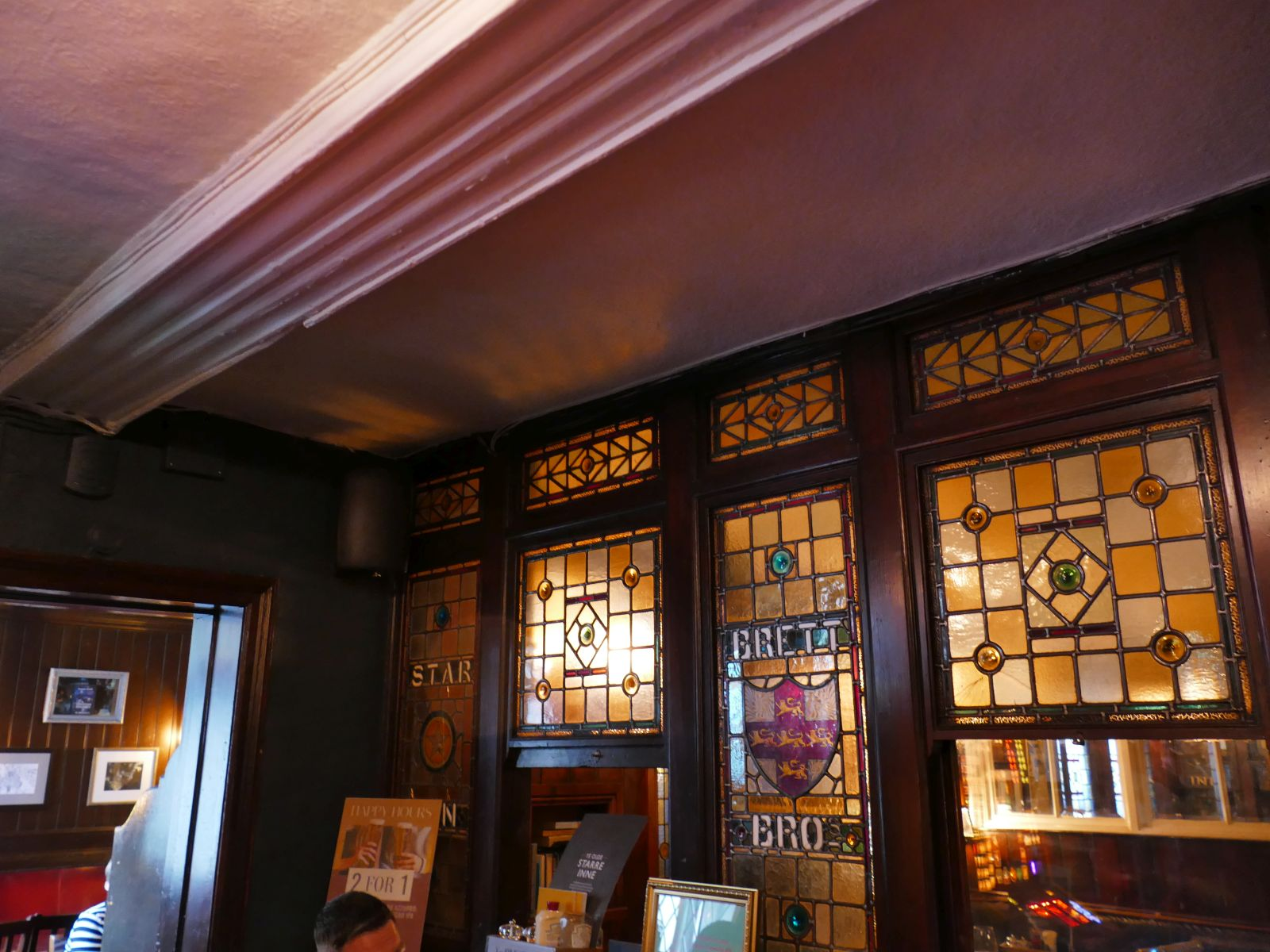
The pub interior

The pub was extended in the early 18th century. In the 1840s, with the coming of the railway, the coaching yard was infilled with a new building, and the pub is now approached via a passageway underneath part of this building. Stables lay behind the pub and could be accessed from Duncombe Place, making the pub a popular location for visiting actors and circus performers.

In the late 19th century, the pub was again extended, at which time it was known as Boddy's Inn. Surviving internal features include an early-18th-century staircase, some 17th-century panelling, and an assortment of benches, glass and panelling from the 19th-century refit. Its former bar screen, of stained glass, probably dates from the 1890s and is believed to have been designed by J. W. Knowles & Co. who were based at 35 Stonegate.

In 1954, the pub was Grade II listed.

== In fiction ==
Ye Olde Starre Inne features in the alternative history novel Jonathan Strange & Mr Norrell by British writer Susanna Clarke, set in 19th-century England around the time of the Napoleonic Wars. The second chapter of the novel, The Old Starre Inn, features characters Mr Segundus and Mr Honeyfoot bringing news of Mr Norrell's magical library to a crowded meeting of the Learned Society of York Magicians.

== See also ==
- Listed buildings in York (within the city walls, northern part)
