= 9, 9A and 11 Stonegate =

Listed building in York, England

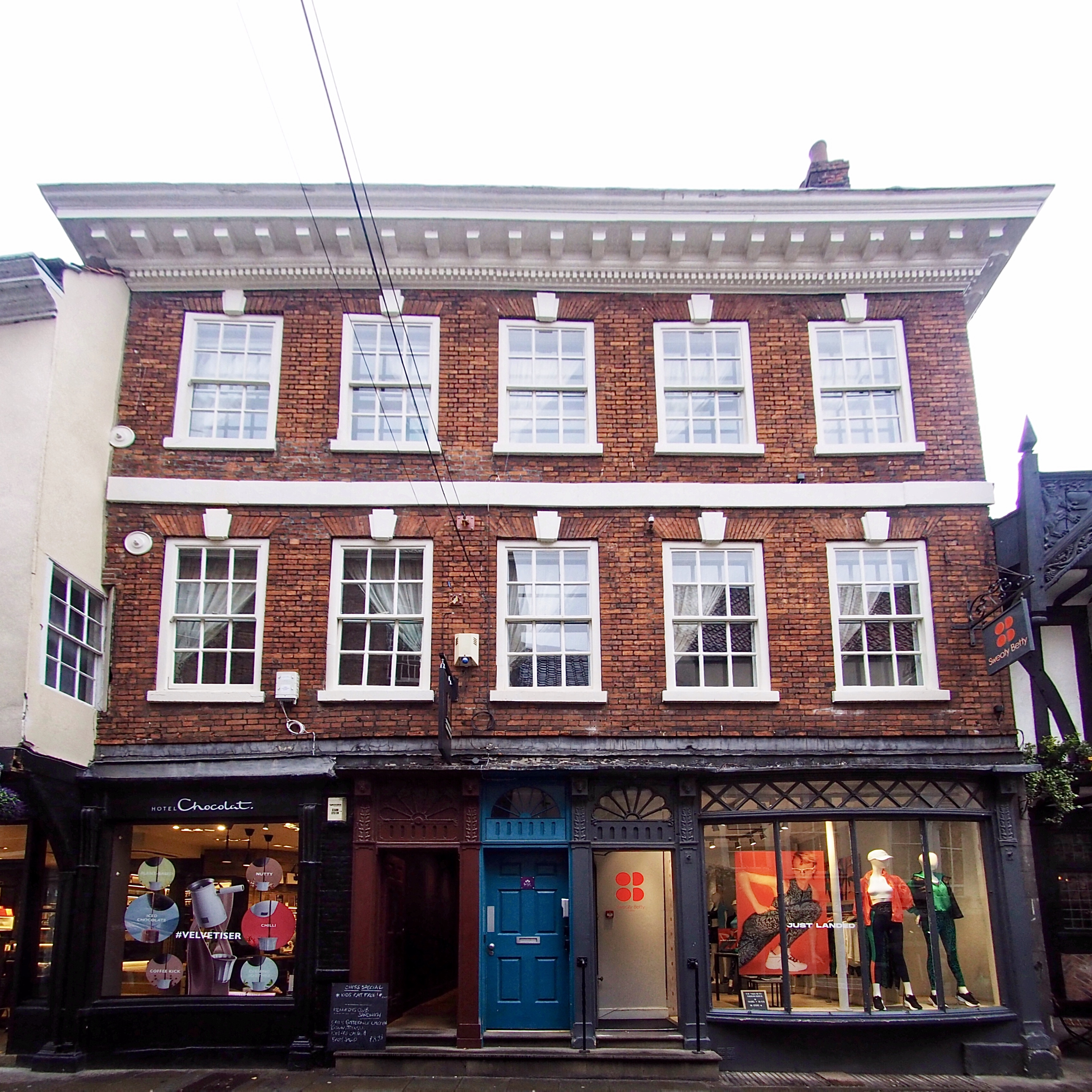
- The building in 2023; No. 9 is on the right
- Interactive map of the 9, 9A and 11 Stonegate area
- Former names: 7 and 8 Stonegate

General information
- Type: House, now in retail use
- Location: Stonegate, York, England
- Coordinates: 53°57′39″N 1°05′01″W
- Years built: 18th century (No. 11); Mid-18th century (No. 9)
- Renovated: Early 19th century (remodelled); Late 20th century (altered)

Design and construction
- Designations

Listed Building – Grade II*
- Official name: 9, 9A and 11, Stonegate
- Designated: 14 June 1954
- Reference no.: 1256537

9, 9A and 11 Stonegate is a Grade II* listed building on Stonegate in the city of York, England. It originated as an 18th‑century house with outbuildings, with the rear block at No. 11 as the earliest part and a mid‑18th‑century front range at No. 9 added and remodelled in the early 19th century for shop use, followed by later 20th-century alteration. The buildings were included in the Central Historic Core conservation area in 1968. No. 9 now houses Sweaty Betty at basement and ground-floor level, with rented accommodation above, and the range stands between the Punch Bowl pub and No. 13.

== History ==
The building stands on Stonegate and began as an 18th‑century house with outbuildings, the earliest part being the rear block at No. 11. A mid‑18th‑century front range at No. 9 was added and later remodelled in the early 19th century when the property was converted into two shops, with substantial further alteration in the late 20th century. It was formerly known as 7 and 8 Stonegate, although the date at which this numbering was applied is unclear.

On 14 June 1954, Nos. 9–11 were designated a Grade II* listed building, and in 1968 the site was included within the newly established Central Historic Core conservation area. The basement and ground floor of No. 9 are now occupied by the retailer Sweaty Betty, with rented accommodation on the upper floors of Nos. 9–11. It stands between the Grade II-listed Punch Bowl pub at No. 7 and No. 13, also listed at Grade II*.

== Architecture ==
The front is built of orange brick with a timber cornice, and the shopfronts and doorways are timber with applied decorative detailing. The rear is of red brick, and the roof is tiled with brick chimneys.

The front has three storeys and five windows. Two shaped steps lead to a wide doorway set within the shopfront, framed by plain pilasters with decorative tops and a broad frieze beneath a flat cornice. The shop door is glazed, with a vent above and a patterned fanlight; the two adjoining doors have raised panels and similar vents and fanlights. To the right is a bow‑fronted shop window with four large panes between moulded divisions, and a small glazed upper section with latticework and rosettes, with an iron grille below. The shopfront to the left continues the design from No. 13, with a large plate‑glass window framed by panelled pilasters, a plain frieze and a moulded cornice.

The upper floors have 12‑pane sash windows with painted stone sills and flat brick arches with painted keyblocks. A painted band marks the second floor, and a prominent cornice with dentils and brackets runs along the eaves.

No. 11 sits back from Stonegate, behind Nos. 9 and 13, and is reached by a passage from the street that opens into a small courtyard. At the rear, the first floor has a four‑pane sash and the second floor a 12‑pane sash, each beneath a shallow brick arch. A fluted rainwater head is fixed to the wall. The gable ends on both sides contain pairs of Yorkshire sashes.

=== Interior ===
The cellar includes a back room with an early-19th‑century kitchen range. On the ground floor, a rounded arch with simple pilasters and shaped imposts leads into what was once the stair hall. The main staircase is a dogleg flight rising to the attics, with two turned balusters on each step, a bulbous newel at the foot, and a moulded handrail that ramps up along the flights. The lowest section is enclosed in raised panelling, and the stairwell has matching dado panelling and moulded skirting.

On the first floor, the larger front room retains a window surround with decorative carving, a moulded dado rail and a dentilled cornice. On the second floor, all rooms keep their original stone fireplaces with shaped friezes and flat shelves. The larger front room also has a round‑headed grate, a simple coved cornice and a six‑panel cupboard door on HL hinges; the smaller front room contains an early-19th‑century basket grate; and the rear room has another six‑panel cupboard door on HL hinges.

== See also ==
- Grade II* listed buildings in the City of York
- Listed buildings in York (within the city walls, northern part)
