= 49 Stonegate =

Listed building in York, England

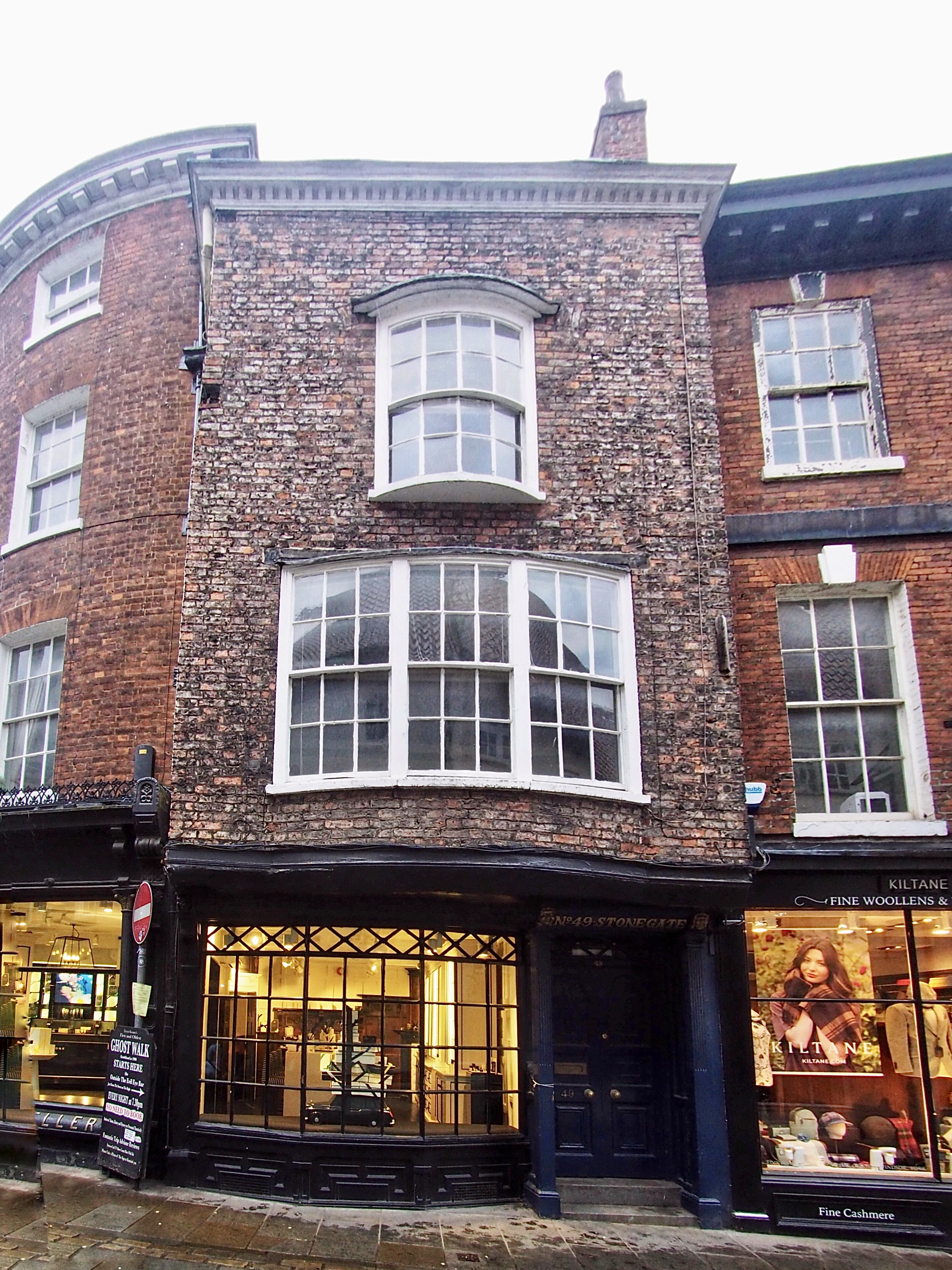
- The building in 2023
- Interactive map of the 49 Stonegate area
- Former names: 30 Stonegate

General information
- Status: Converted to commercial use
- Type: House and shop (former)
- Location: Stonegate, York, England
- Coordinates: 53°57′41″N 1°04′57″W
- Year built: Early 17th century
- Renovated: Early 18th century (extended); Early 19th century (altered); Late 19th century (shopfront)

Design and construction
- Designations

Listed Building – Grade II*
- Official name: 49, Stonegate
- Designated: 14 June 1954
- Reference no.: 1256491

49 Stonegate is a Grade II* listed building on Stonegate in the city of York, England. Dating from the early 17th century, it was built as a house and a shop and later adapted for commercial use, with alterations made in the 18th and 19th centuries. The building was included in the Central Historic Core conservation area in 1968. It is now occupied by Jo Malone London at ground level, with offices above, and stands between Nos. 45–47 and No. 51.

== History ==
The building stands on Stonegate and was originally a house and a shop. It dates from the early 17th century, was extended in the early 18th century, and had its front and roof altered in the early 19th century. The shopfront was updated later in the 19th century. It was formerly known as 30 Stonegate.

On 14 June 1954, No. 49 was designated a Grade II* listed building, and in 1968 the site was included within the newly established Central Historic Core conservation area. No. 49 is now in use by Jo Malone London at ground level, with office space above. It stands between Nos. 45–47, also Grade II*-listed, and No. 51, listed at Grade II.

== Architecture ==
The building has a timber frame and a brick front, with a shopfront that includes some cast‑iron elements. It has a timber cornice and a pantile roof that is hipped in front of the original gable. It has three storeys and an attic, and the single front window sits above a jettied first floor. The shopfront is set between pilasters and a sloping fascia carrying the name "Henry Hardcastle, established 1770: No. 49 Stonegate". To one side of a shallow bay window are double doors with shaped panels, both features having lattice overlights. The first floor has a bow window with three 12‑pane sashes, and the second floor has a single bowed 16‑pane sash. The eaves have a moulded cornice with modillions, returned at each end.

=== Interior ===
Inside, part of the ground‑floor shop is lined with reused 17th‑century panelling, some of it carved. A staircase with shaped detailing, turned balusters, square newels with attached half‑balusters, and a ramped handrail runs from the ground floor up to the second. On the first‑floor landing there is a small‑pane sash window set in a round‑arched surround, and a similar arch on moulded supports leads into the front rooms. The beams in these rooms are decorated with plaster trails of fruit and flowers. Several 17th‑century panelled doors remain, including some hung on butterfly hinges.

== See also ==
- Grade II* listed buildings in the City of York
- Listed buildings in York (within the city walls, northern part)
