= 13 Stonegate =

Listed building in York, England

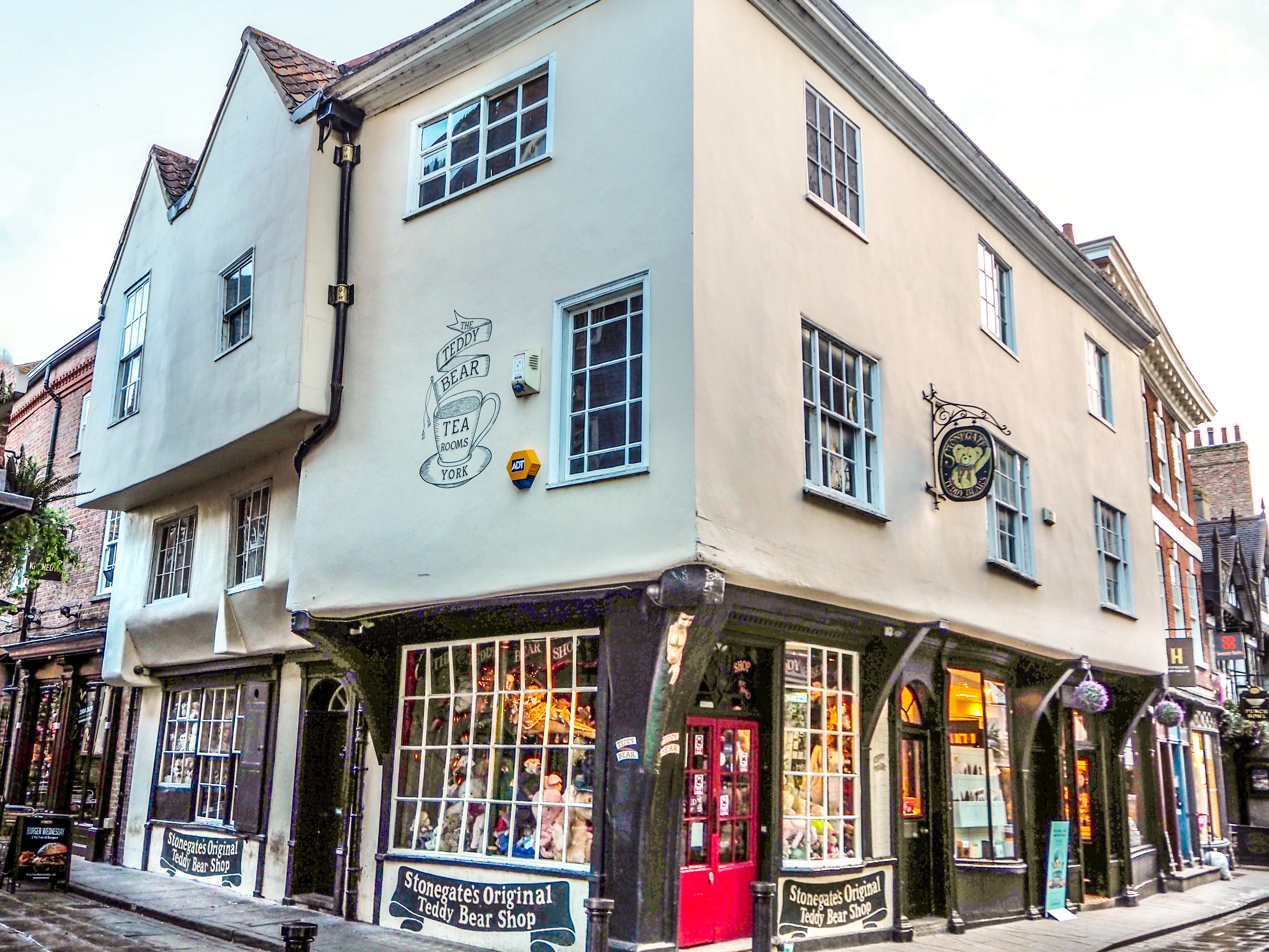
- The building in 2023
- Interactive map of the 13 Stonegate area

General information
- Location: Stonegate, York, England
- Coordinates: 53°57′39″N 1°05′01″W
- Year built: Early 15th century
- Renovated: Late 15th century (range to Little Stonegate); Early 17th century (raised) c. 1800 (refronted and remodelled, new shopfronts)

Technical details
- Floor count: 3

Design and construction
- Designations

Listed Building – Grade II*
- Official name: 13, Stonegate
- Designated: 14 June 1954
- Reference no.: 1256509

13 Stonegate is a historic building in the city centre of York, England.

The oldest part of the building faces onto Stonegate. It was built in the early 15th century as a three-storey, three-bay building. It may have been constructed by Thomas Doncaster, who leased the site from the Archdeacon of Richmond in 1423, but was not asked to pay rent, suggesting that he was improving the site. Both the upper floors were jettied, to Stonegate and to Little Stonegate, but the top floor was cut back, probably in the 18th century, in line with the first floor. The wing facing Little Stonegate was constructed as a separate house in about 1500, originally two storeys, but with a third, jettied, storey added in the 17th century. In about 1600, the building facing Stonegate was extended to the rear, filling the angle between the two buildings.

The internal arrangement was altered over the years, and by the 19th century, it formed three tenements, each with its own staircase. The current shopfronts on the ground floor date from about 1800. By 1954, the building had been united, when it was listed at Grade II*. It stands next to Nos. 9, 9A and 11, which are also listed at Grade II*, and No. 15, likewise Grade II* listed, lies across the entrance to Little Stonegate. Since 1990, the building has housed the Original Teddy Bear Shop.

The entire building is timber-framed, and externally plastered. There is a corner post, with a figurehead of a mermaid, dating to the 17th century. The roofs are covered with tiles and pantiles, and there are brick chimneystacks. Inside, there are several Georgian fittings, including a mid-18th-century staircase, a Doric portico, and a marble fireplace. The Little Stonegate range has a steep staircase of similar date.

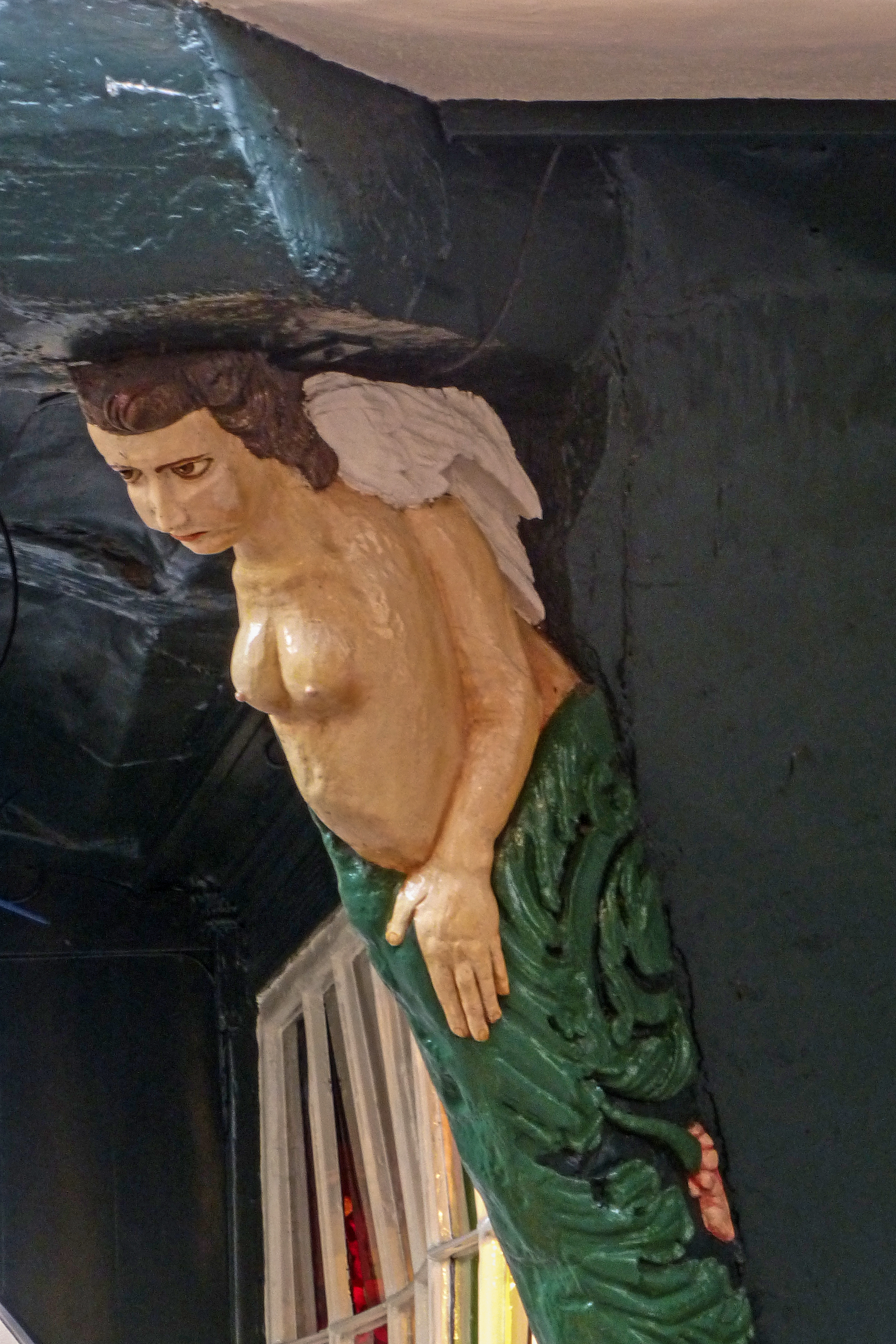
The figurehead in 2013

== See also ==
- Grade II* listed buildings in the City of York
- Listed buildings in York (within the city walls, northern part)
