= 54–58 Stonegate =

Listed terrace in York, England

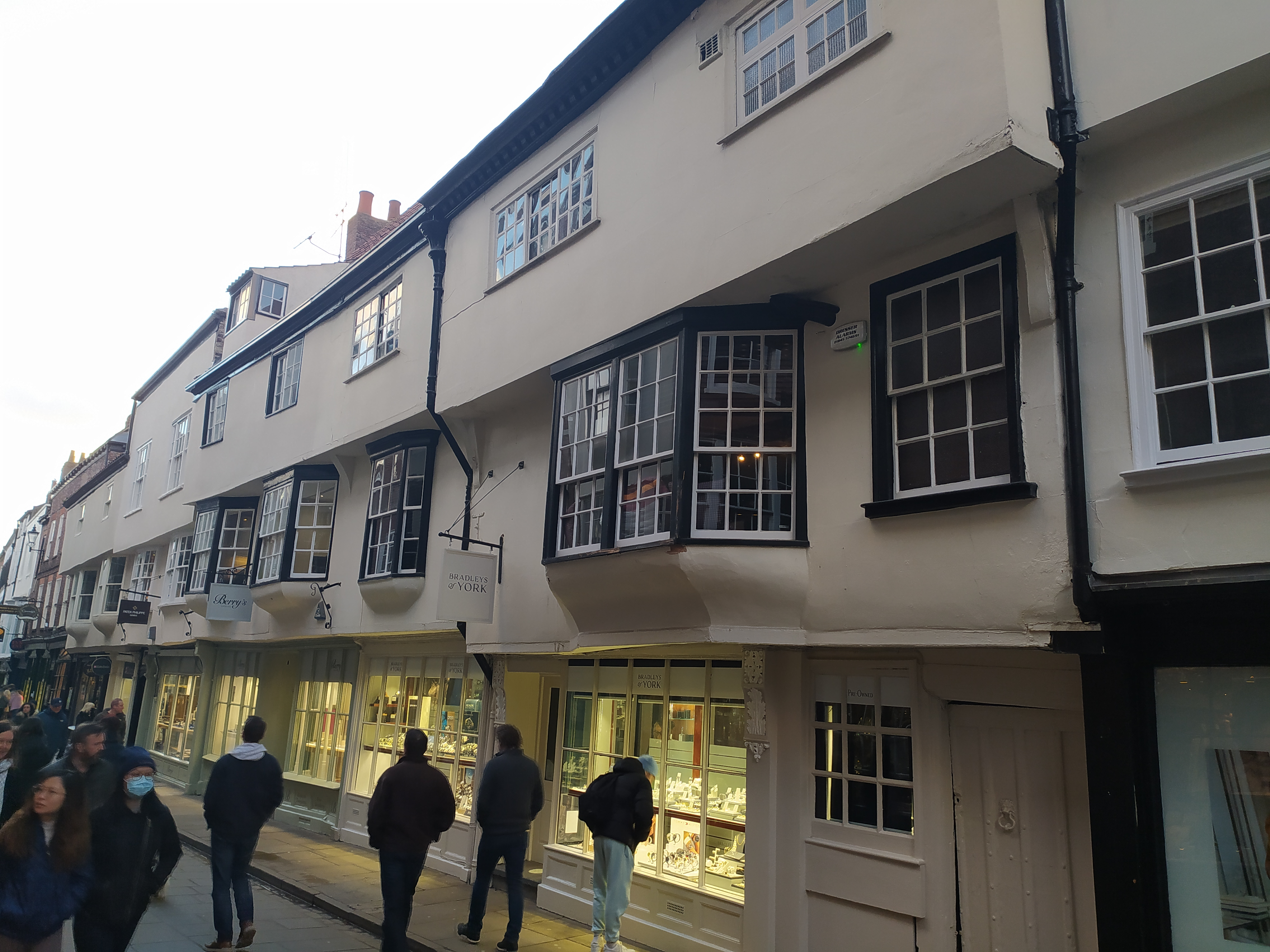
- The terrace in 2022
- Interactive map of the 54–58 Stonegate area

General information
- Status: Converted to retail use
- Type: Tenements (former)
- Location: Stonegate, York, England
- Coordinates: 53.9614°N 1.0826°W
- Year built: Early 14th century

Technical details
- Material: Timber framed
- Floor count: 3

Design and construction
- Designations

Listed Building – Grade II*
- Official name: 54, 56 and 58, Stonegate
- Designated: 14 June 1954
- Reference no.: 1256493

54–58 Stonegate is a Grade II* listed medieval terrace in the city centre of York, England.

The building was constructed in the early 14th century, on the north-west side of Stonegate, one of the city's most important streets. The site had been owned by the Vicars Choral since 1278, and they built the three-storey terrace, originally consisting of up to seven tenements. In 1415, it was described as a "site with shops built on it and chambers above at the corner of Stonegate opposite the entrance of the Minster", and the profits from its rents were devoted to St Andrew's Chantry at York Minster.

In 1549, the chantries were dissolved, and the terrace was sold, but the Vicars Choral later re-acquired it. The buildings have been repeatedly altered, and the divisions between the properties now do not line up with the original divisions, particularly on the upper floors. In the 17th century, a panelled room was created on the first floor of 58 Stonegate, which survives. Around 1646, the upper floors of the two north-east bays were rebuilt, and that section of the terrace was connected with neighbouring properties on High Petergate; that building now being listed separately from the remainder of the terrace.

The building is timber-framed, with the jettied front to Stonegate being plastered over. The windows all date from the 18th and 19th centuries, and the ground floor fronts have been replaced by 19th-century shop fronts, although a 17th-century door to No. 58 survives.

== See also ==
- Grade II* listed buildings in the City of York
- Listed buildings in York (within the city walls, northern part)
