= 48 and 50 Stonegate =

Listed building in York, England

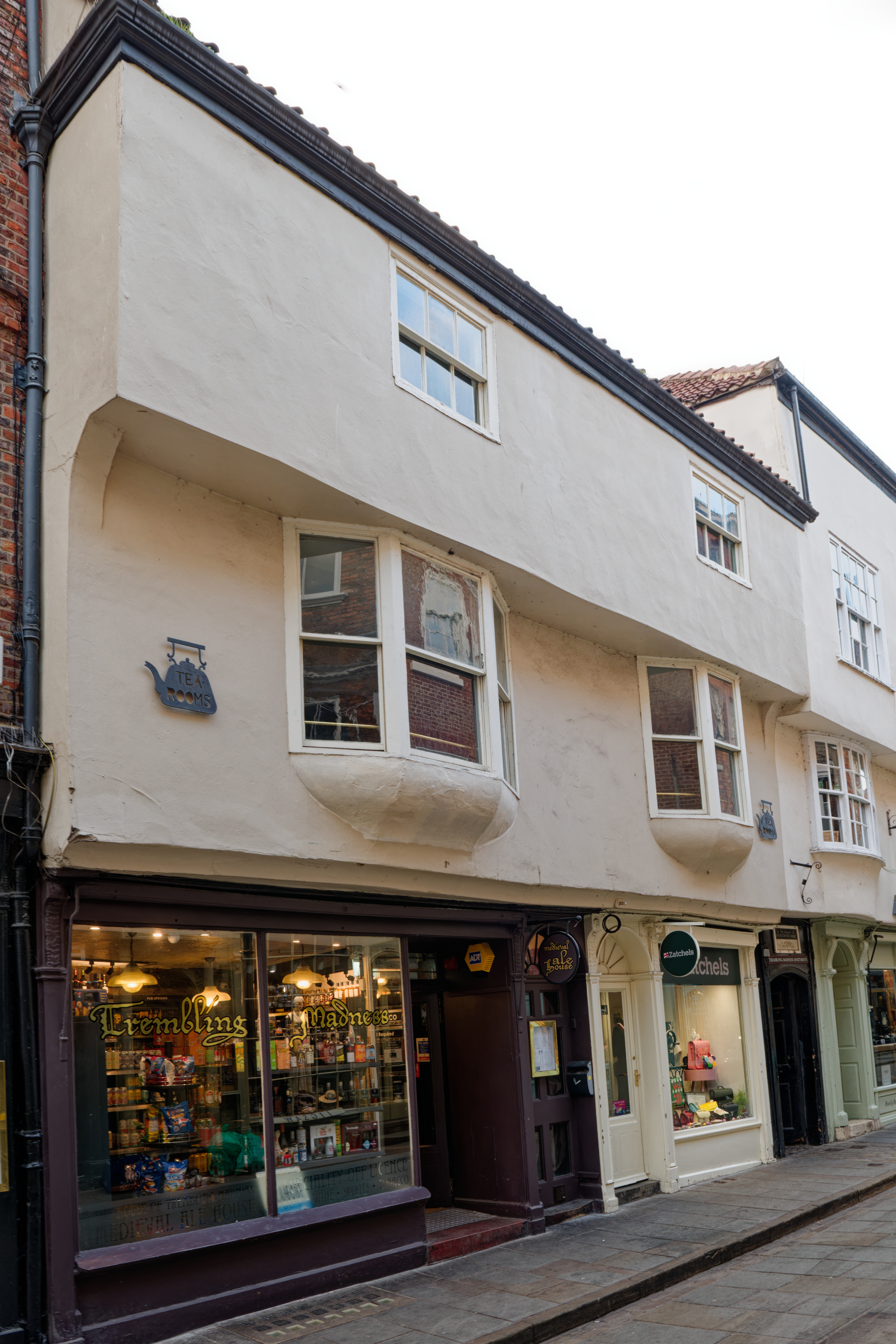
- The building in 2024
- Former names: 36 and 37 Stonegate

General information
- Status: Converted to a public house (No. 48) and shop (No. 50)
- Type: House (former)
- Location: Stonegate, York, England
- Coordinates: 53°57′41″N 1°04′58″W
- Year built: c. 1600; 426 years ago
- Renovated: 19th century

Technical details
- Material: Timber framed
- Floor count: 3

Design and construction
- Designations

Listed Building – Grade II*
- Official name: 48 and 50, Stonegate
- Designated: 14 June 1954
- Reference no.: 1256490

48 and 50 Stonegate is a Grade II* listed building on Stonegate in York, England, built around 1600 and altered in the 19th century. It was included in the Central Historic Core conservation area in 1968. No. 48 has been used by the House of the Trembling Madness public house since 2009, occupying the ground floor and an upper hall. The upper floors of Nos. 48 and 50 have long been linked with those of No. 46, formerly used together as Little Betty's Café; a 2025 approval allows The Little Ale House to reuse the first and second‑floor rooms across Nos. 46–50, while the ground-floor unit at No. 50 remains in separate commercial use.

== History ==
The timber-framed building lies on the north side of Stonegate. It was built in about 1600, and was altered in the 19th century, when two shopfronts were inserted on the ground floor, the windows were changed, and the interior was rearranged. It was formerly known as 36 and 37 Stonegate, although the date at which this numbering was applied is unclear. The building was Grade II* listed in 1954, and in 1968 the site was included within the newly established Central Historic Core conservation area.

Since 2009, No. 48 has been home to the House of the Trembling Madness pub and shop, which won a 2024 award as the UK's leading independent beer retailer. The Campaign for Real Ale regards it as an "outstanding pub conversion". Although Nos. 44 and 46 and Nos. 48 and 50 are separate Grade II* listed buildings, their upper floors have long been linked. The properties were used together for many years as Little Betty's Café, and a February 2025 planning approval allowed The Little Ale House to reuse the first and second‑floor rooms across Nos. 46–50. As a result, the new bar spans the upper levels of both structures, accessing them via its own ground‑floor entrance at No. 46. The House of the Trembling Madness continues to operate independently from the ground floor and upper hall of No. 48, and the independent ground-floor retail unit at No. 50 remains in separate commercial use.

== Architecture ==
The three‑storey building has a timber structure covered in render and painted at the front. It has timber shopfronts and doorways with cast‑iron glazing bars, a shaped timber cornice at the eaves, and a pantile roof with brick chimneys. The front has two jettied upper floors with two windows on each storey. The shopfronts include central paired doorways with fanlights, plate‑glass windows with roller blinds and sloping timber sills, and a recessed glazed door to No. 48. The first‑floor windows are small projecting bays with three single‑pane lights, and the second‑floor windows are short six‑pane sashes. The right‑hand side faces a narrow passageway and has a six‑panel door and Yorkshire sash windows, with three eight‑pane lights at ground level and two nine‑pane lights above. The Norman House stands at the rear. Inside, several historic fireplaces survive, including one from around 1700, together with an early staircase between the first and second floors of No. 50 and an 18th‑century door in its attic.

=== Interior ===
Inside, parts of the timber frame are visible on the ground and second floors of No. 50. On the first floor, the front room of No. 48 has a simple fireplace with a rounded opening, while the front room of No. 50 has a corner fireplace with modest decorative detailing. No. 50 also contains an early staircase between the first and second floors, with slender balusters, turned newels and a shaped handrail. In its attic there is an 18th‑century two‑panel door.

== See also ==
- Grade II* listed buildings in the City of York
- Listed buildings in York (within the city walls, northern part)
