= Minster Close =

Former street in York, England

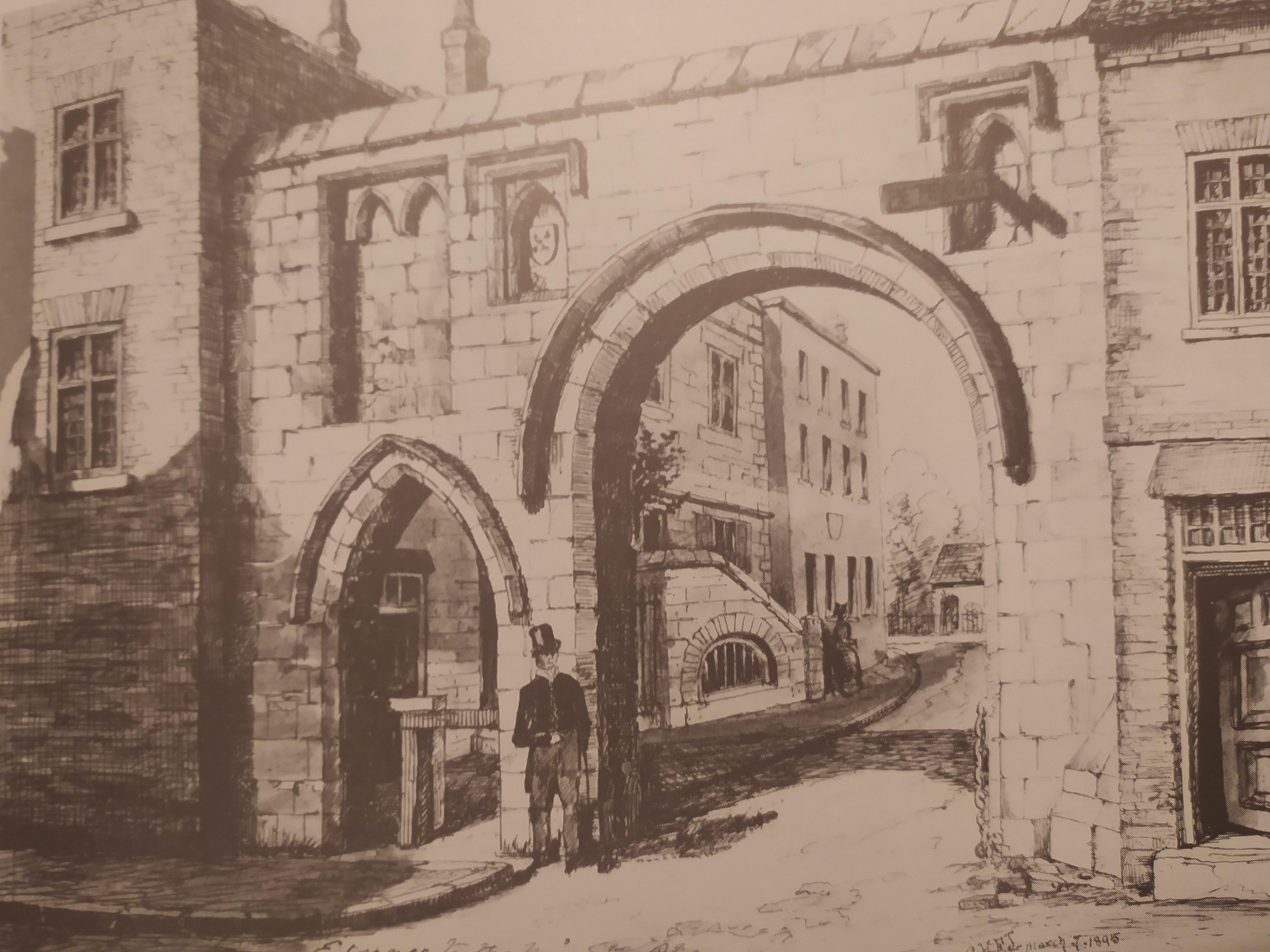
- Former entrance to the Close from Lop Lane
- Location within York
- Maintained by: City of York
- Location: York, England
- Coordinates: 53.9614281°N 1.0848301°W

The Minster Close or Minster Precinct is the area surrounding York Minster. It first appeared in records from the late 13th century, when a wall was constructed around it.

Access to the Minster Close was through one of four gates, on Lop Lane, Minster Gates, College Street and Ogleforth. In 1396, a bridge was constructed over Goodramgate, so that the vicars choral based in Bedern could enter the Close without crossing the public street. Of these entrances, only the College Street one survives in part, as 30 and 32 Goodramgate and 11 and 12 College Street.

In a 1276 survey mentioning both houses and tenants, the street is called clausum cimiterii ecclesie Sancti Petri (St Peter's Close). Buildings around the Minster accumulated and eventually obscured the church, particularly on its southern side. When Augustus Duncombe became dean in 1858, he found that there were no open views of the Minster except from the north – specifically from the Deanery garden. He decided to remedy this by purchasing and demolishing houses between 1859 and 1864 to form Duncombe Place out of the narrow Lop Lane and top of Blake Street.

With the demolition of the walls and the opening out of the close, the name has fallen out of use. The area it covered is now represented by College Green, Deangate, Minster Yard, Ogleforth, Precentor's Court and Dean's Park. A plaque memorialising Minster Close was placed on the Deangate pillars in 1995.
