= 2 College Street =

Listed building in York, England

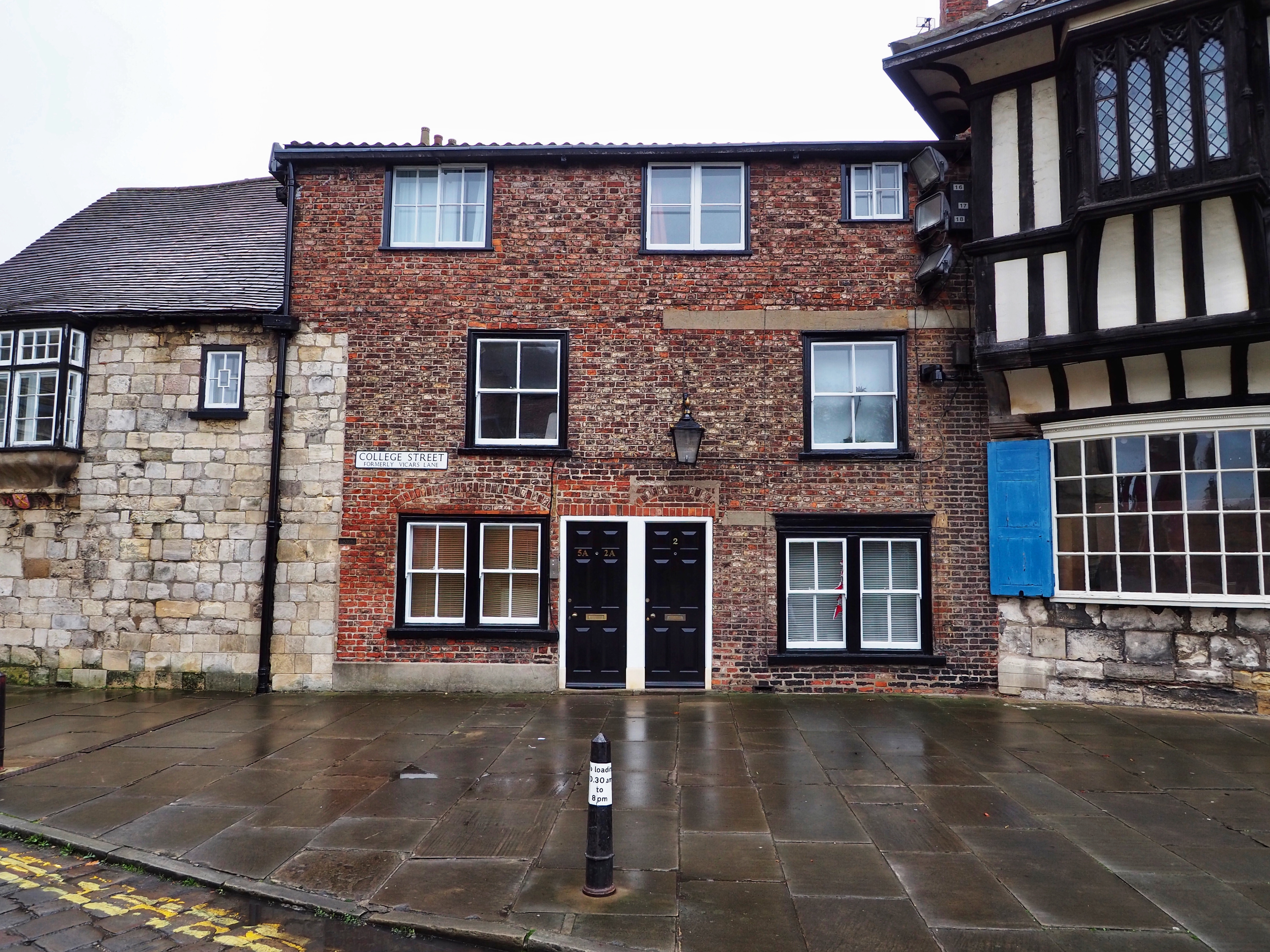
- The building in 2023
- Interactive map of the 2 College Street area

General information
- Status: Converted to holiday let
- Location: York, England
- Coordinates: 53.9624°N 1.0804°W
- Year built: Late 13th or early 14th century
- Renovated: c. 1700 (remodelled); Early 19th century (heightened)

Listed Building – Grade II*
- Official name: 2, College Street
- Designated: 14 June 1954
- Reference no.: 1259189

2 College Street is a Grade II* listed building in the city of York, England. Dating from the late 13th or early 14th century, it originated as part of a longer run of small medieval dwellings and was later altered, heightened and extended. The property stands beside St William's College and near York Minster, with all three buildings facing College Green. It is now used as a holiday apartment marketed as "York Minster View".

== History ==
2 College Street originated as part of a longer run of small medieval dwellings, with No. 1 later absorbed into the range. The surviving structure dates from the late 13th or early 14th century, and elements of its medieval timber frame remain within the roof spaces. The house was altered around 1700, heightened in the early 19th century, and subsequently extended and modified. Its eastern side developed irregularly as later additions enclosed the narrow space between the building and St William's College, incorporating part of the college's west wall within the interior. The property saw further changes during the 19th century, including the insertion of a passageway and the reworking of openings associated with neighbouring premises at 5 Minster Yard.

On 14 June 1954, No. 2 was designated a Grade II* listed building, and in 1968 the site was included within the newly established Central Historic Core conservation area. A further section of the medieval building line is now absorbed into 5 Minster Yard, which is also Grade II* listed. Together with Grade I‑listed St William's College on the opposite side of No. 2, all three properties face College Green and are in close proximity to York Minster. In its present use, the property operates as a holiday apartment known as "York Minster View".

== Architecture ==
The original structure was timber-framed but later given a new front in buff‑orange brick and heightened using pink‑brown brick. It has a pantile roof and a brick chimney. The front is three storeys with a single window bay. At ground level there is a six‑panel door on the left and, beside it, a pair of four‑pane windows with a painted stone sill. The first floor has one four‑pane window, and the top floor has a two‑by‑two casement and a two‑by‑two Yorkshire sash. At the back, the first and second floors have 16‑pane windows.

=== Interior ===
Much of the interior is concealed by later finishes, but several historic features remain. The house contains a closed‑string staircase with rounded balusters, square newels and a plain handrail, and a three‑panel door survives on the second floor. In the attic rooms, parts of the medieval roof structure are visible, including sections of at least four timber trusses. These retain principal rafters, passing braces, struts and carpenters' marks, with further timbers continuing into the adjoining roof spaces. Some elements are exposed within partition walls, while others are partly hidden by modern plaster and paint.

== See also ==
- Grade II* listed buildings in the City of York
- Listed buildings in York (within the city walls, northern part)
