= College Green (York) =

Open space in York, England

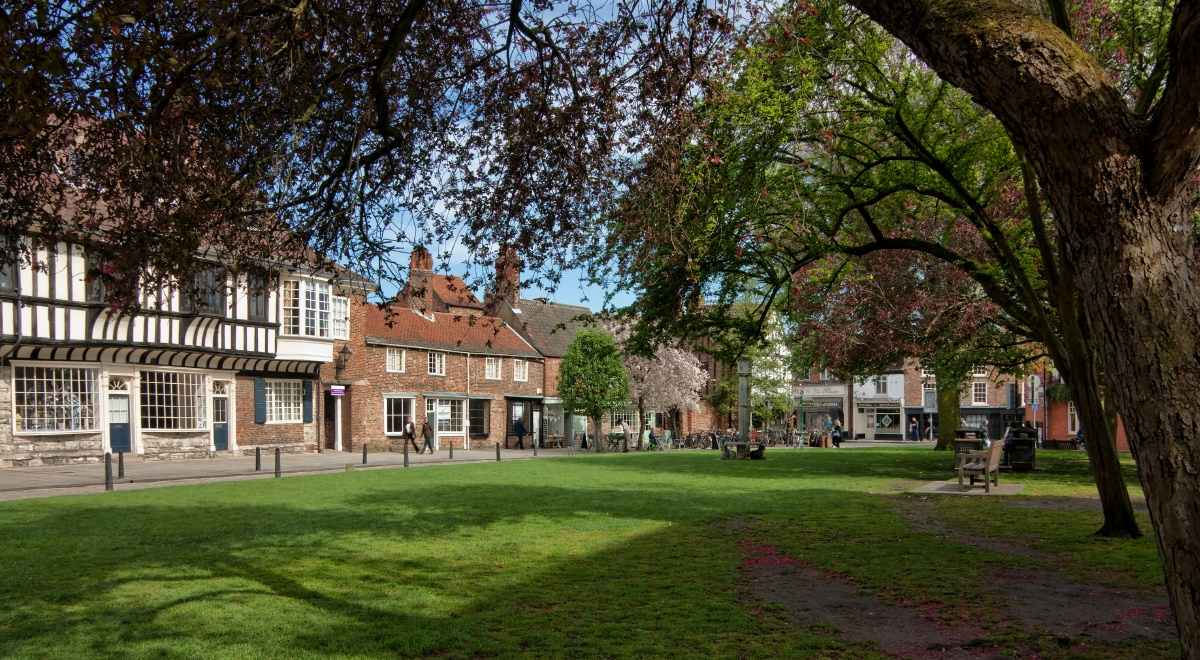
- View across College Green towards College Street and Goodramgate
- Location within York
- Former name: Vicars' Lane
- Namesake: St William's College
- Maintained by: City of York
- Location: York, England
- Coordinates: 53.9621°N 1.0803°W
- North: College Street
- East: College Street
- South: Deangate
- West: Minster Yard

Construction
- Completion: 1862; 164 years ago

College Green is an open space in the city centre of York, England.

== History ==
The green lies within the historic precinct of York Minster. As "Vicars' Lane", it was in existence by the late Mediaeval period, named as it led from York Minster towards the College of Vicars Choral on Bedern. In the 18th-century, it was known as "Little Alice Lane", after someone who lived in the area, then from about 1800 it became known as College Street, for St William's College.

The church of St Mary ad Valvas lay on the south-west side of the street until 1362, when it was demolished in order to build the Lady Chapel of York Minster. In 1749, the Countess of Huntingdon's Connexion built a chapel south-east of the college. By the end of the century, it was used by the Calvinistic Baptists.

South of the Minster, the south-west side was built up with houses. Two were demolished in 1862, and College Green was created. The remainder were demolished between 1905 and 1937 in order to enlarge College Green. In 1955 the road was realigned a little further south-west and the green was enlarged, while a sundial originally from Drakelow Hall was erected on the green.

The green is regularly used as a location for the York Mystery Plays, and it has also been used as outdoor seating for local hospitality businesses.

== Layout and architecture ==
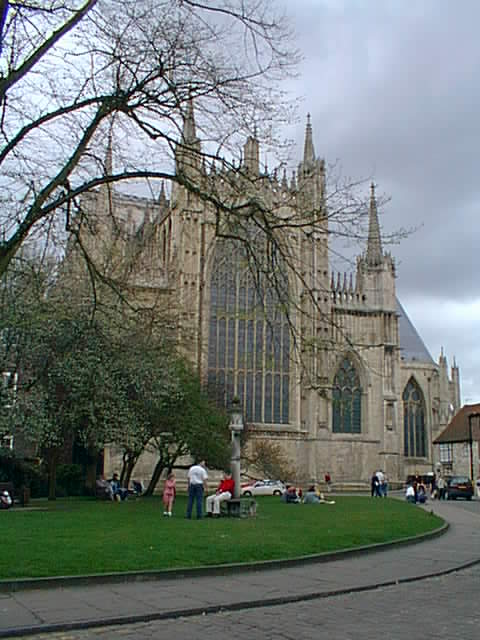
York Minster seen across College Green

College Street runs south-east from Minster Yard, near its junction with Chapter House Street, to a junction with Goodramgate and Deangate. College Green runs along its south-west side. The Queen's Path runs from the south-west side of the street around the south-east side of the Minster.

Notable buildings on the north-east side of the street include 2 College Street, with parts dating back to the 13th century; St William's College, a Grade I-listed building dating from 1465; 8, 9 and 10 College Street, built around 1830; and the early 14th-century 30 and 32 Goodramgate and 11 and 12 College Street, which incorporates part of a former gateway into the Minster precinct.
