= Cross Keys, York =

Listed pub in York, England

Cross Keys
- The pub in 2025
- Interactive map of the Cross Keys area

General information
- Type: Public house
- Location: 34 Goodramgate, York, England
- Coordinates: 53.9618°N 1.0799°W
- Year built: 1904; 122 years ago
- Renovated: 1986 (altered)
- Client: C. J. Melrose and Co.
- Owner: Mitchells & Butlers

Design and construction
- Architect: Frank Raney
- Designations

Listed Building – Grade II
- Official name: The Cross Keys and attached yard gateway and wall
- Designated: 14 March 1997
- Reference no.: 1257733

Website
- Official website

The Cross Keys is a Grade II listed public house on the corner of Goodramgate and Deangate in York, England. An inn on the site is recorded from 1783, and the present building was completed in 1904 to designs by Frank Raney for C. J. Melrose and Co., replacing an earlier structure demolished during the creation of Deangate. The site was incorporated into the Central Historic Core conservation area in 1968. As of June 2025, the freehold is owned by Mitchells & Butlers and operated under their Nicholson's brand.

== History ==
The earliest known reference to an inn on the site dates from 1783. The 1851 directory of Kingston-upon-Hull and York lists the Cross Keys at No. 83, while the 1885 directory for York records Henry Mawer at the Cross Keys Inn, with the address as No. 84. The variation between the directory numbers, and the present address of No. 34, strongly suggests that Goodramgate's numbering has been reorganised since the 19th century, though minor directory inconsistencies are always possible.

The building then standing was demolished in 1903 during the creation of Deangate, and plans for a replacement were approved that October. The present public house, occupying the corner of Goodramgate and Deangate, was completed in 1904 to designs by Frank Raney of Stonegate for C. J. Melrose and Co. The Campaign for Real Ale records that the rebuilding took place on the site of the former gatehouse to York Minster. The 1913 Kelly's Directory of the North and East Ridings of Yorkshire records Mrs Ann Stephenson at the Cross Keys public house at No. 83.

In 1968 the site was included within the newly established Central Historic Core conservation area. In 1986 the separate rooms were opened up to form a single bar. On 14 March 1997, the Cross Keys was designated a Grade II listed building. As of June 2025, the freehold is owned by Mitchells & Butlers, and operated under their Nicholson's brand.

== Architecture ==
The building is faced in orange brick, with the front to Goodramgate finished in glazed tiles and the Deangate side showing timber framing with plaster panels on the upper floor. The roofs are tiled with brick chimneys, and the yard has brick boundary walls with stone details and timber gates. The plan is wedge‑shaped, with angled bays at the corner.

Both fronts are two storeys. The Goodramgate side has five bays arranged symmetrically around a central gabled bay. The ground floor has a raised base and a band at door‑head height. At the centre is a pair of glazed and panelled doors with a small window above, flanked by wide three‑part windows with patterned glass showing the bar names and crossed keys. These openings are set between upright divisions with decorative tops and heavy projecting bands and pediments. The upper windows are sashes with small panes at the top and single panes below, set under shallow brick arches. The central gable has shaped brickwork at the sides and a panel with crossed keys and the date 1904. The window sills are of glazed material, with those on the first floor linked by brickwork to form a continuous band that continues across the first corner bay. A curved eaves cornice runs across both corner bays.

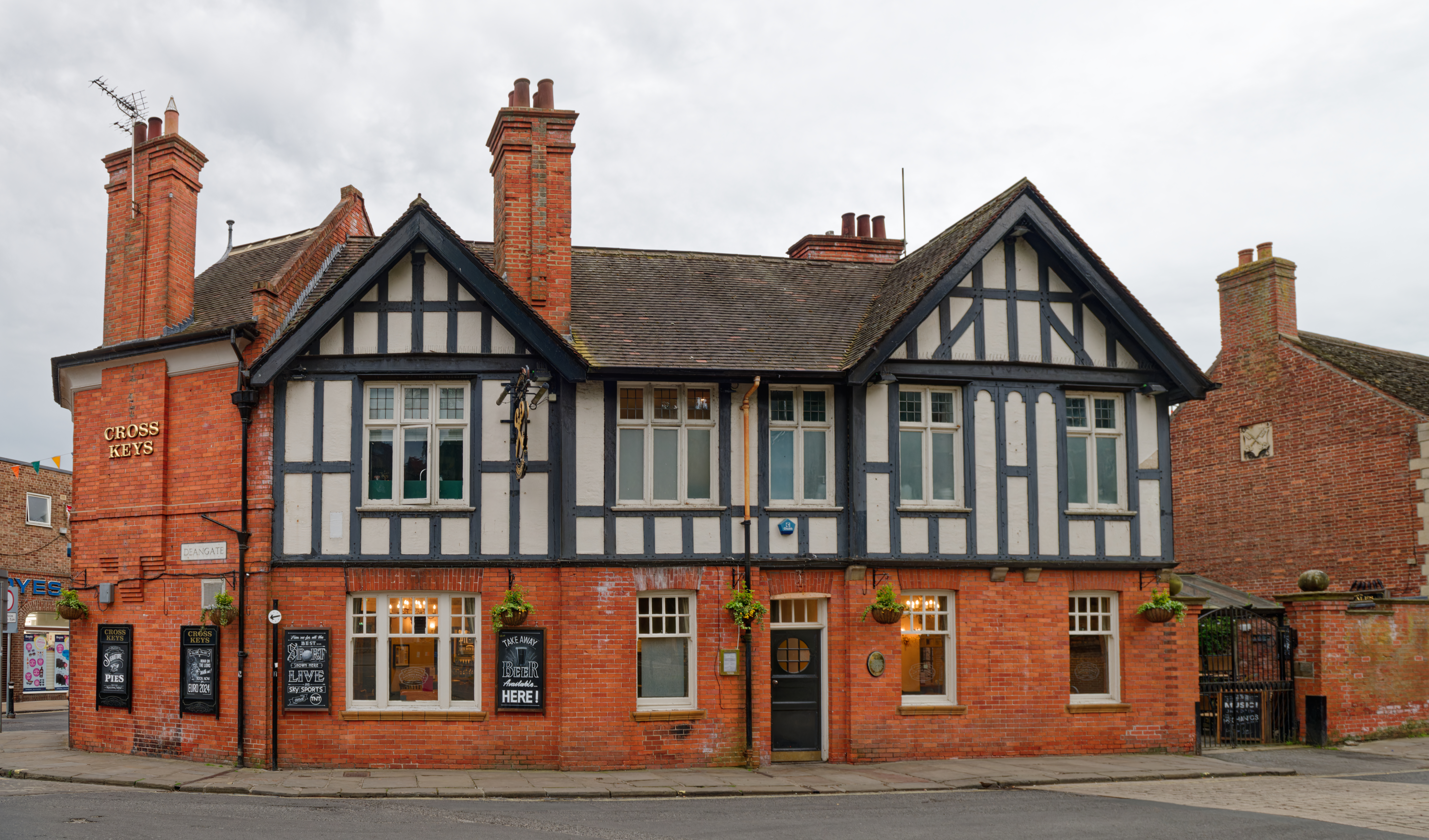
The Deangate front in 2024

The Deangate front has three bays, the outer ones gabled. The centre has a panelled door with a round window and a divided overlight, and a sash window beside it. The right bay has two similar windows; the left bay has a three‑part window with a sash in the middle and narrow lights at the sides. All ground‑floor windows have small‑paned upper sashes and frosted lower panes, with shallow brick arches and glazed sills. The upper windows on this side are divided into smaller sections with casements and small square top lights, set on shaped timber sills.

The corner bay facing Goodramgate has one sash window on each floor, the lower one with frosted glass. The second corner bay has a chimney that projects from the wall and rises through the eaves and roof.

The yard wall is about 1.75 metres (5 ft 9 in) in height and finished with a shaped stone top, rising at intervals into piers capped with moulded cornices and ball finials. The gates are a pair of timber leaves with a shallow curved top, hung on long, forked strap hinges.

== See also ==
- Listed buildings in York (within the city walls, northern part)
