= The Golden Slipper, York =

Listed pub in York, England

The Golden Slipper
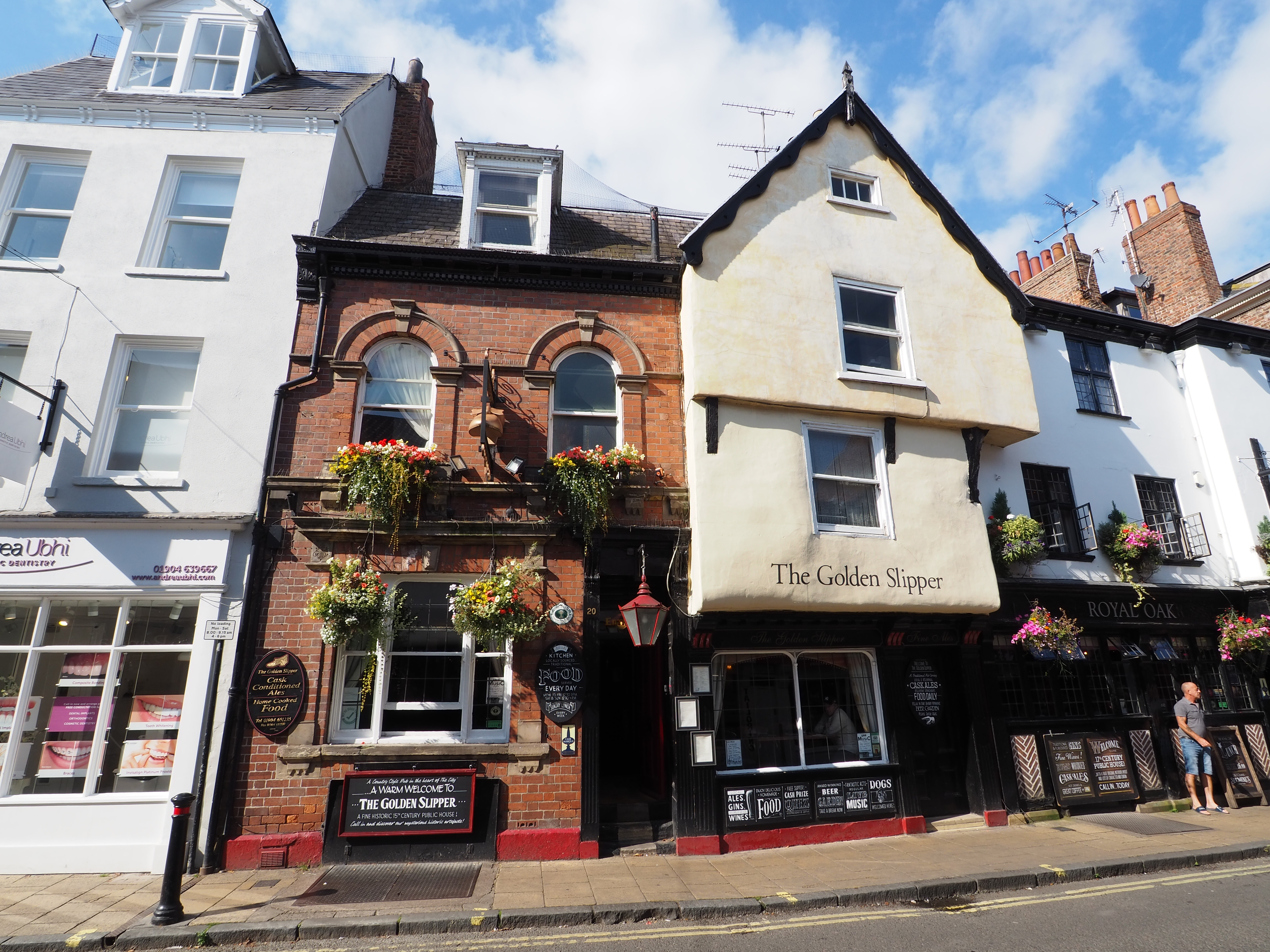
- The pub in 2021
- Former names: The Show; The Slipper

General information
- Type: Public house; originally a house
- Location: 20 Goodramgate, York, England
- Coordinates: 53.9622°N 1.0791°W
- Year built: c. 1500; 526 years ago
- Renovated: 18th century (extended); 19th century (raised); Late 19th century (extended and remodelled)
- Owner: Stonegate

Listed Building – Grade II
- Official name: The Golden Slipper public house
- Designated: 14 June 1954
- Reference no.: 1257765

The Golden Slipper is a Grade II listed public house on Goodramgate in the city centre of York, England.

It was originally constructed about 1500 as a house, with the north-eastern half the building dating from this period. This section has three storeys and is timber-framed. Its facade is jettied to the street, and rendered over. To its right, it originally overhung an alleyway, but the neighbouring Royal Oak has since extended into this space. In the 18th century it was extended to the rear in brick, with an attic added to this section in the 19th century.

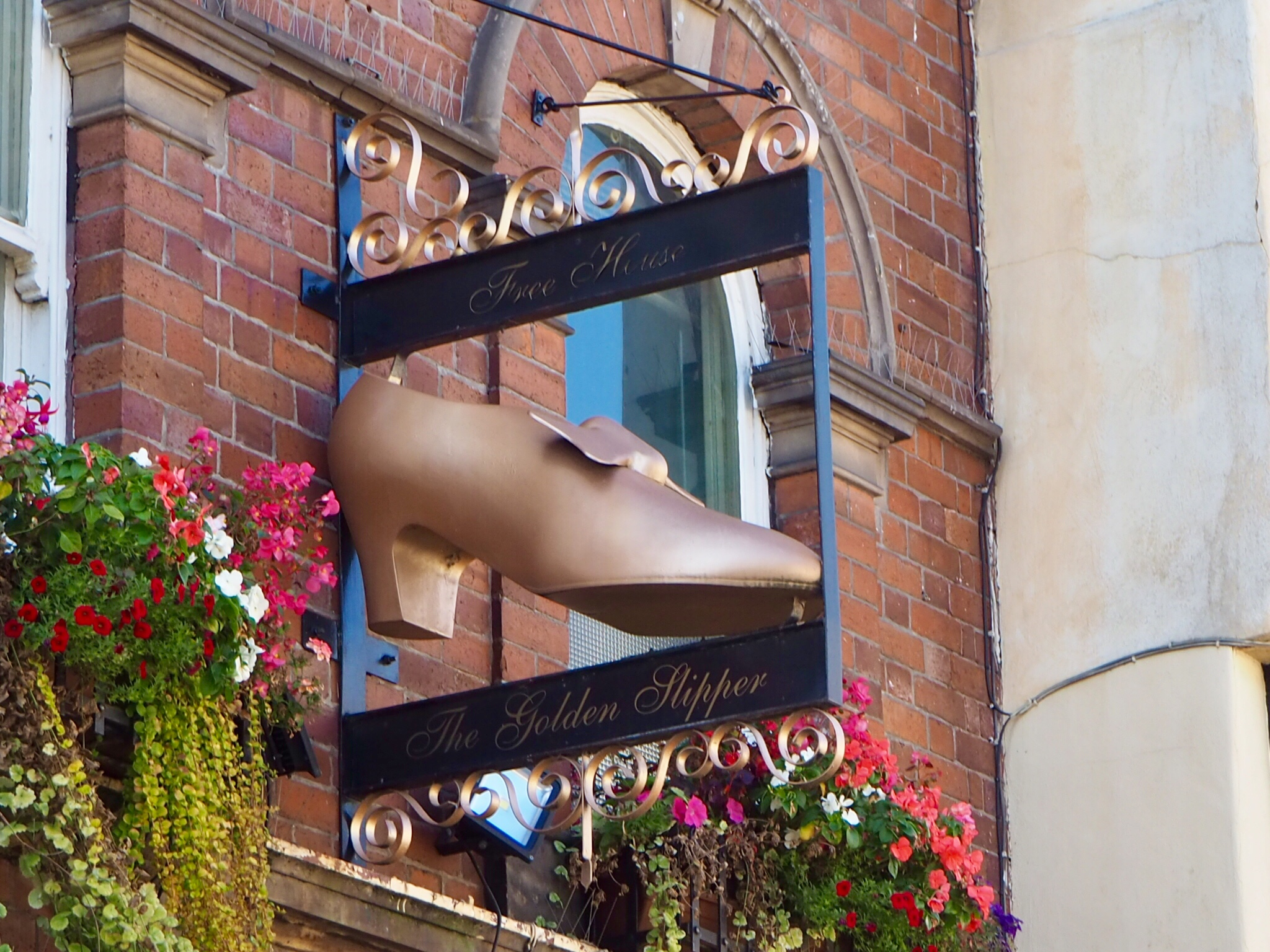
The sign above the entrance

The south-western half of the building dates from the 19th century. It is brick-built and of two storeys, with a basement and attic. Internally, the building has been frequently altered and does not retain any original features. Its ground floor, based around a corridor, is largely Victorian, but was partly redesigned in 1983, against the objections of the Campaign for Real Ale.

The older half of the building may have already been a pub in the 18th century, named The Show, the name taken either from a greyhound, or as an alternative spelling of "shoe". By 1812, it was The Slipper, becoming The Golden Slipper in the 20th century.

There are stories of the pub being haunted, with ghosts said to manifest themselves when the building is being decorated. The haunting was linked to the discovery of a medieval child's shoe in 1984, during work at the pub. The building was later exorcised. As of June 2026, the freehold is owned by Stonegate Pub Company.

== See also ==
- Listed buildings in York (within the city walls, northern part)
