= Snickelways of York =

Small streets and alleys in York, England

Coordinates: 53.958°N 1.082°W

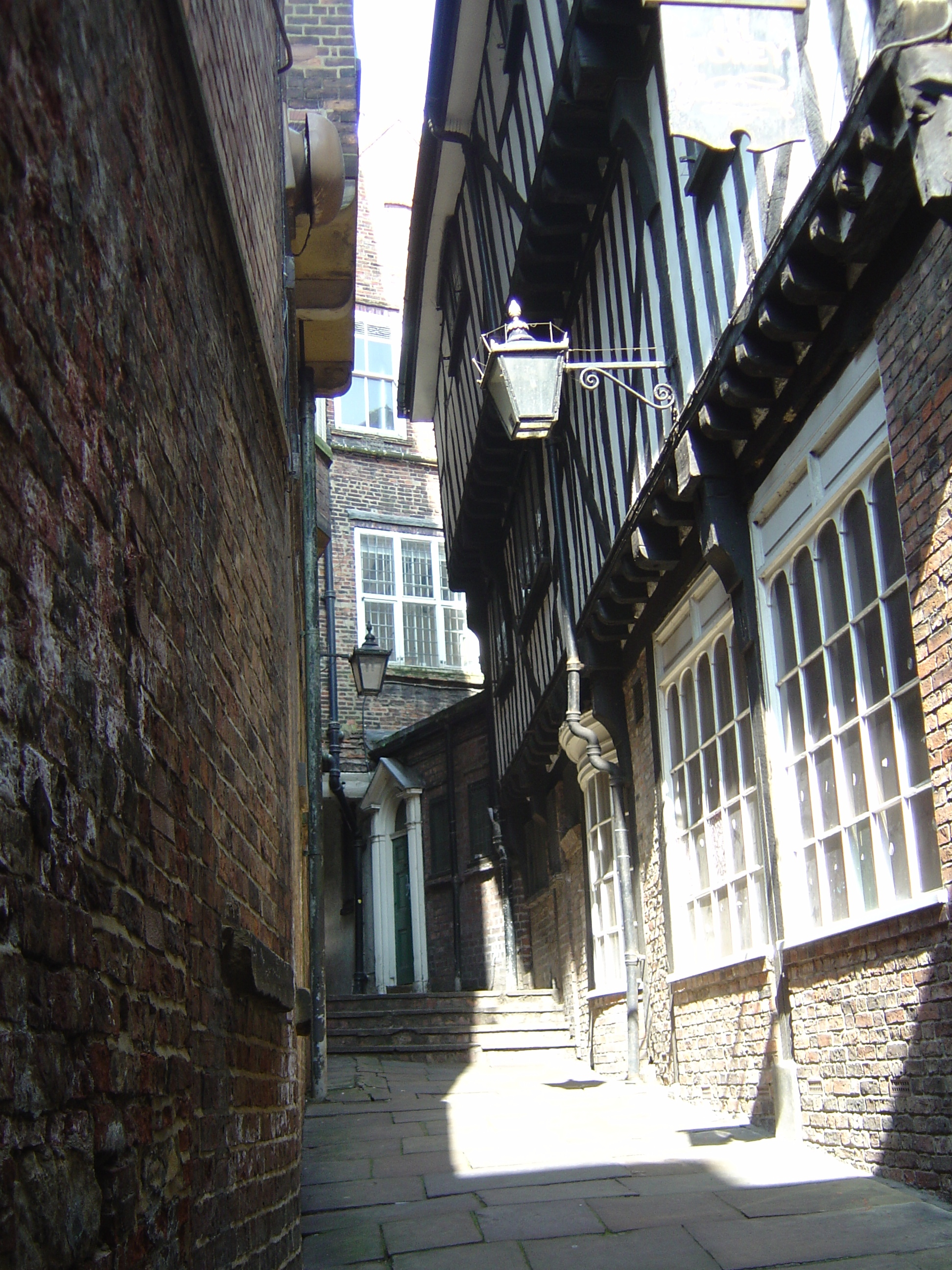
- Lady Peckett's Yard, named after the wife of a former Lord Mayor of York
- Interactive map of Snickelways of York
- Location: York, England

The Snickelways of York, often misspelt Snickleways, are a collection of narrow streets and alleys in the city of York, England. The word Snickelway was coined by local author Mark W. Jones in 1983 in his book A Walk Around the Snickelways of York, and is a portmanteau of the words snicket, meaning a passageway between walls or fences, ginnel, a narrow passageway between or through buildings, and alleyway, a narrow street or lane. Although the word is a neologism, it quickly became part of the local vocabulary, and has even been used in official council documents, for example when giving notice of temporary footpath closures.

== Definition ==
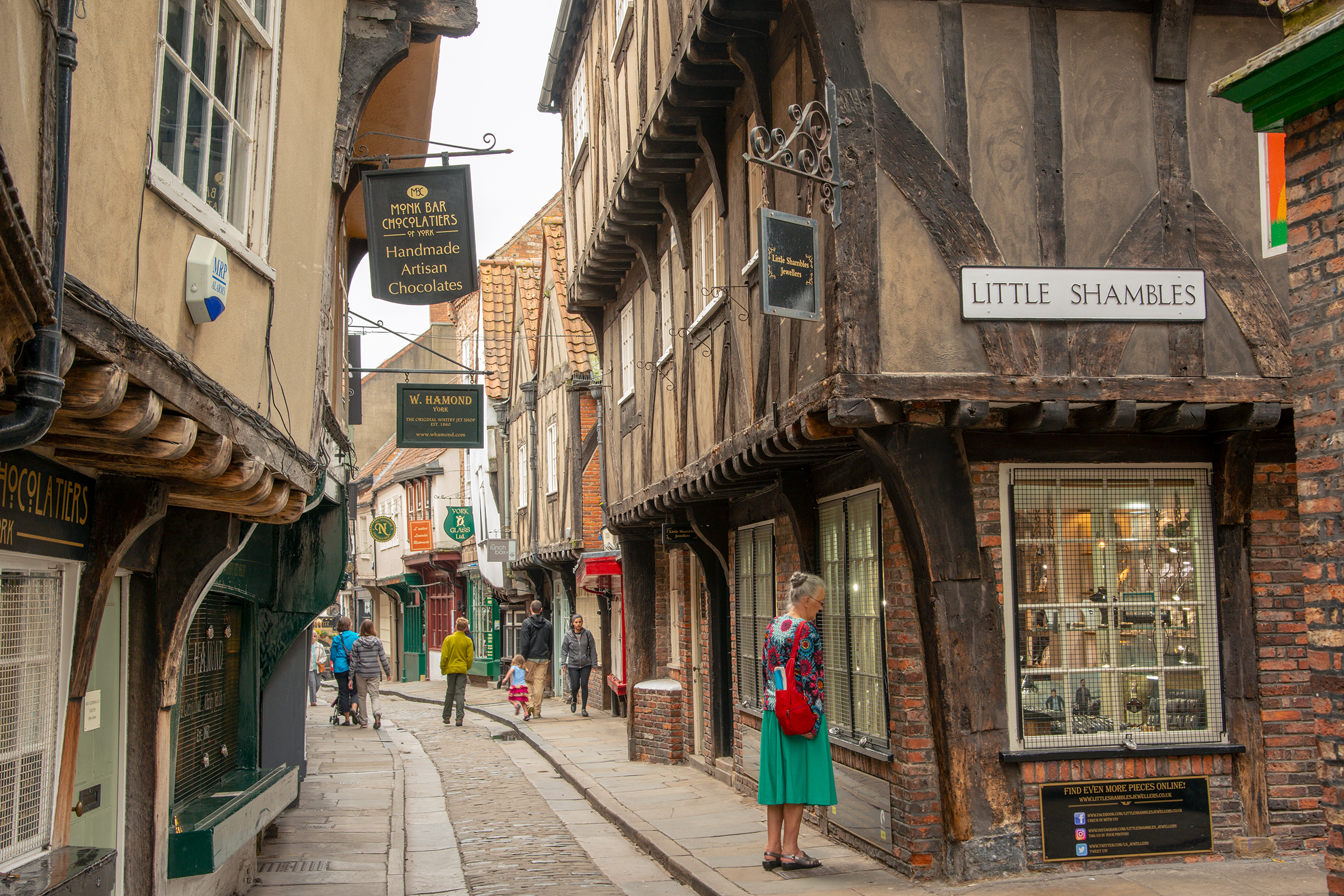
Five snickelways lead off The Shambles

The snickelways themselves are usually small paths or lanes between buildings, not wide enough for a vehicle to pass down, and usually public rights of way. Jones provides the following definition for them:

A Snickelway is a narrow place to walk along, leading from somewhere to somewhere else, usually in a town or city, especially in the city of York.

York has many such paths, mostly mediaeval, though there are some modern paths as well. They have names like any other city street, often quirky names such as Mad Alice Lane, Nether Hornpot Lane and even Finkle Street (formerly Mucky Peg Lane).

== A Walk around the Snickelways of York ==
A Walk around the Snickelways of York, by Mark W. Jones

In 1983 Jones devised a walk taking in 50 snickelways within the city walls. His book, A Walk around the Snickelways of York, soon became a local bestseller. It was unusual in being completely hand-written rather than using typeset printed text, with hand-drawn illustrations, a technique which Jones acknowledged as inspired by the Pictorial Guides of Alfred Wainwright. At least nine editions of the book have been published, each revision incorporating necessary changes, such as the closure of snickelways which were not public rights of way or the opening of new paths.

The popularity of the book led to the author being called to present talks on the Snickelways, complete with a slide show. This in turn led to the publication in 1991 of an expanded, hardback book, The Complete Snickelways of York. This combined the original hand-written text with printed text and photographs. It also included information about Snickelways and other footpaths in the suburbs of York.

== Gallery ==
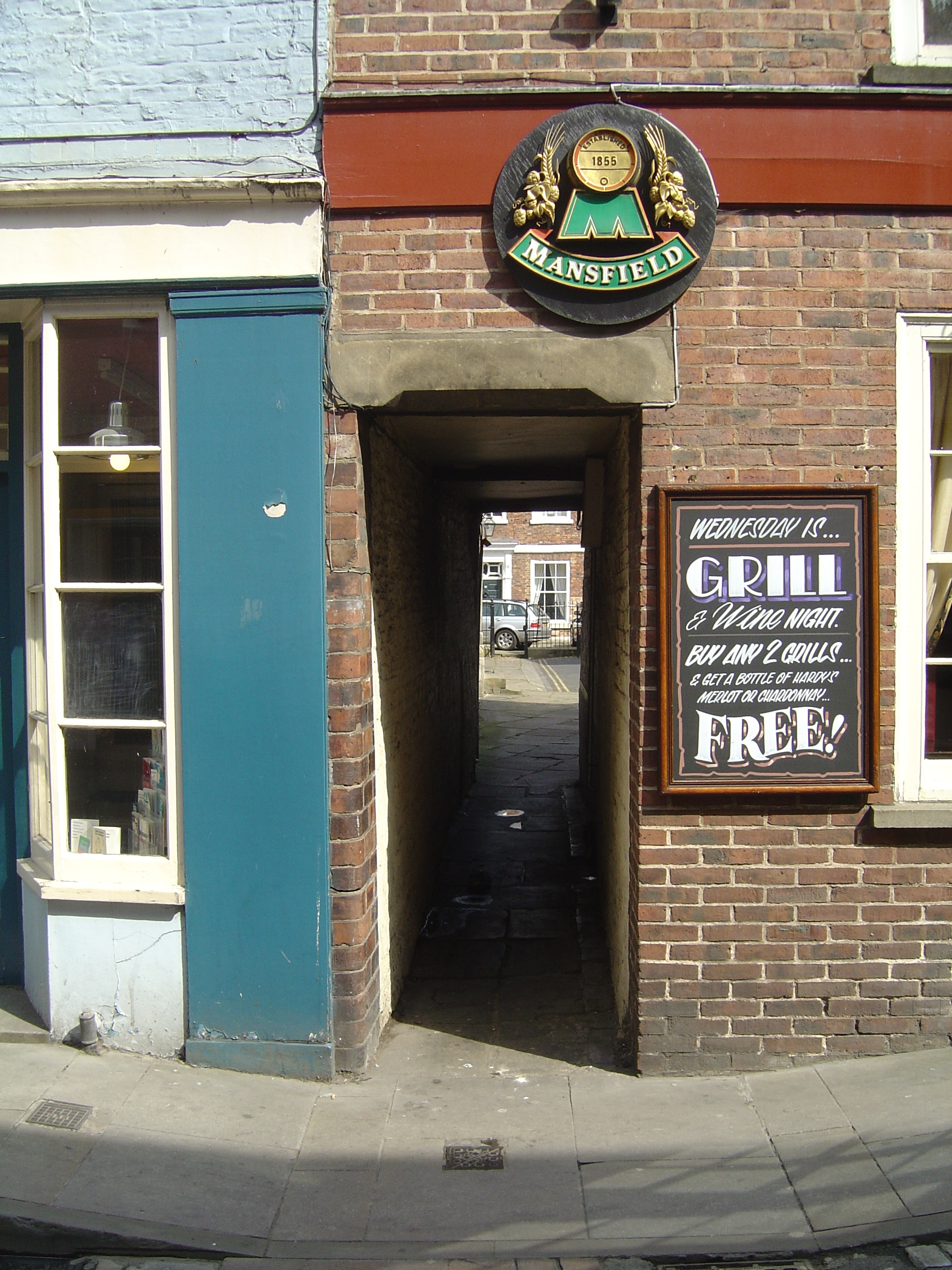
The shortest Snickelway, Hole-in-the-Wall, after the adjacent pub, which may be named after the nearby Bootham Bar.

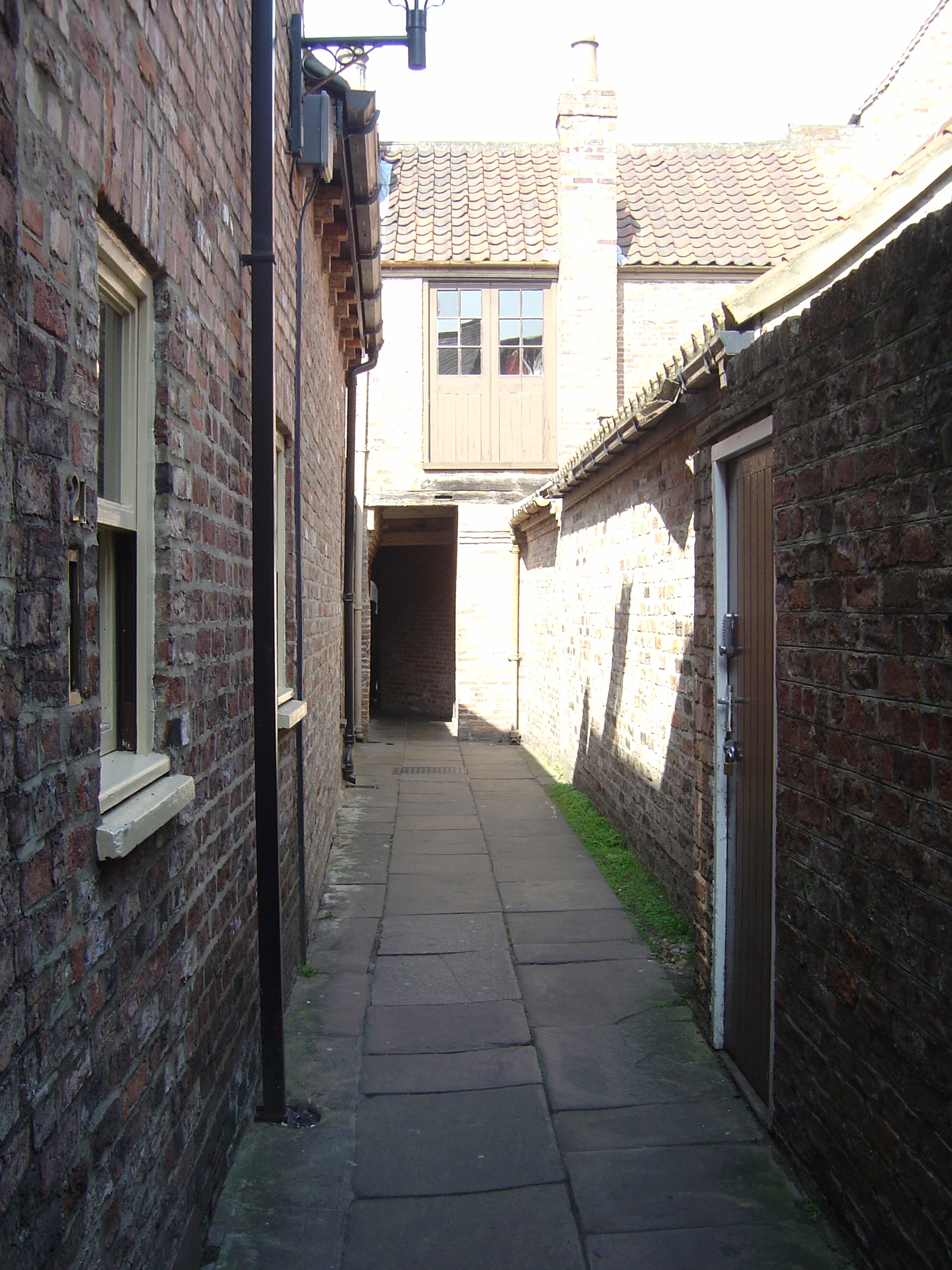
Coffee Yard is the longest Snickelway - nearly 220 feet (67 metres) long.

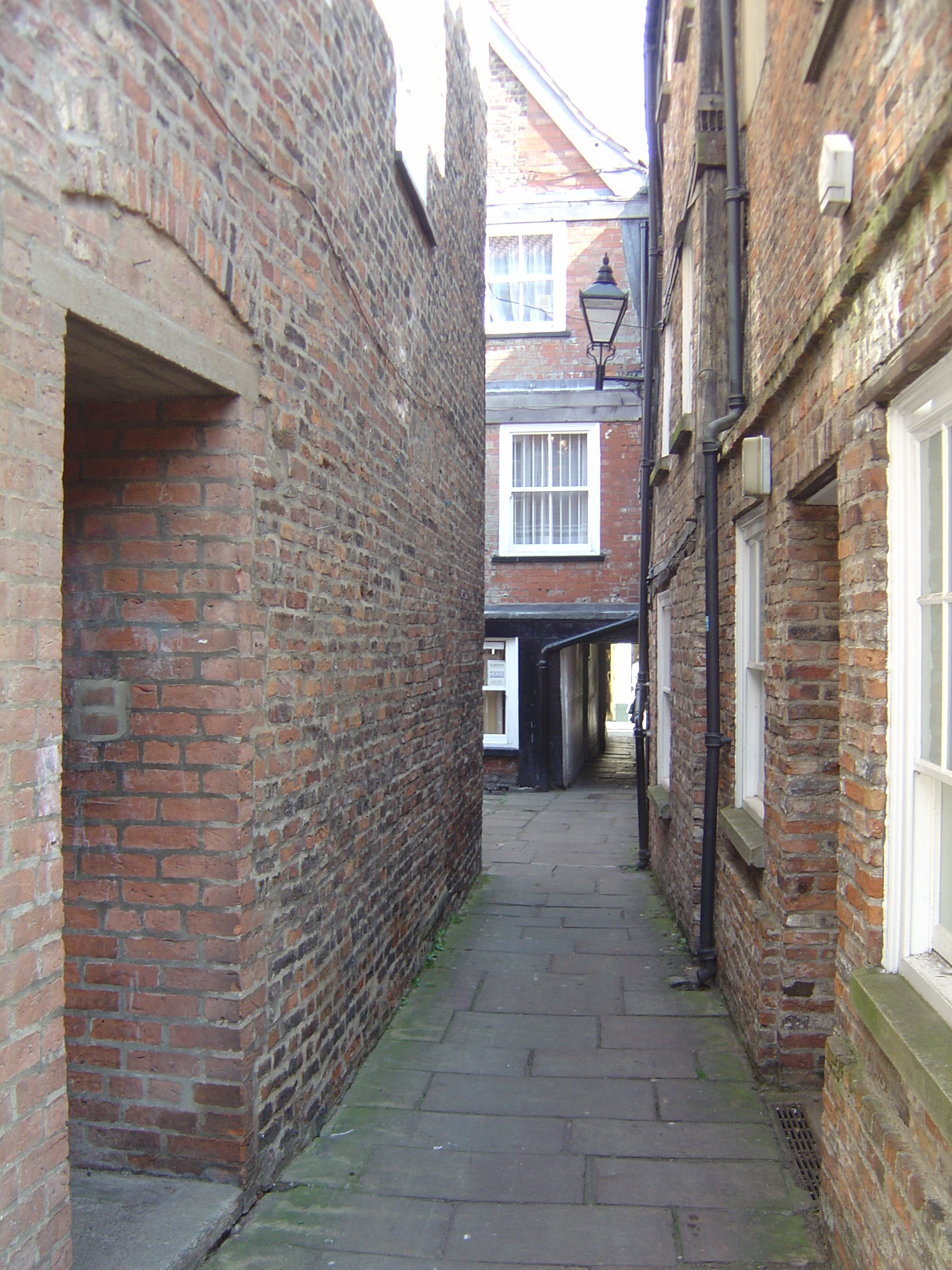
Mad Alice Lane (also known as Lund's Court) – reputedly named after a woman hanged for poisoning her husband.

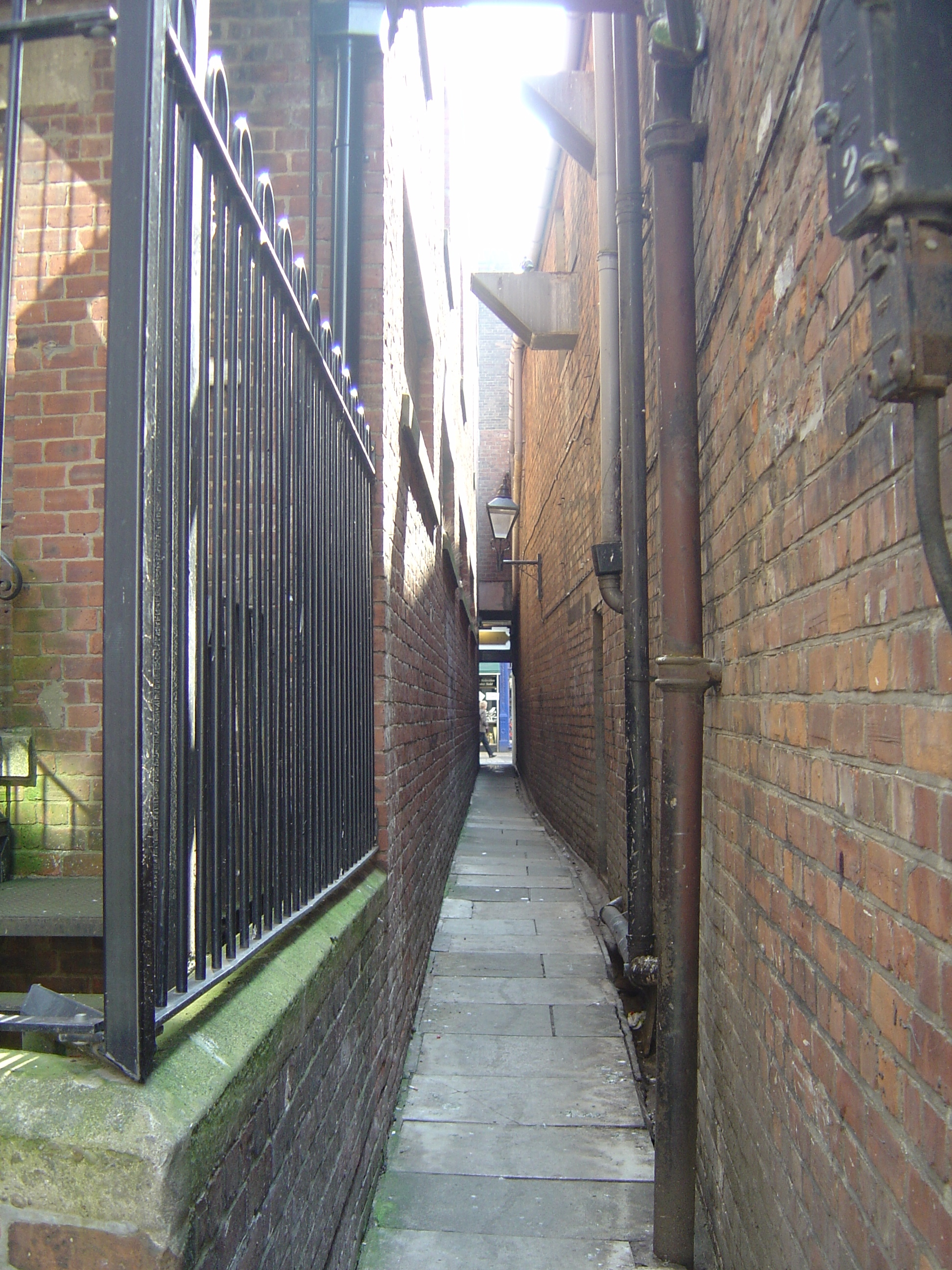
Pope's Head Alley – only 2 ft 7 in (790 mm) wide.

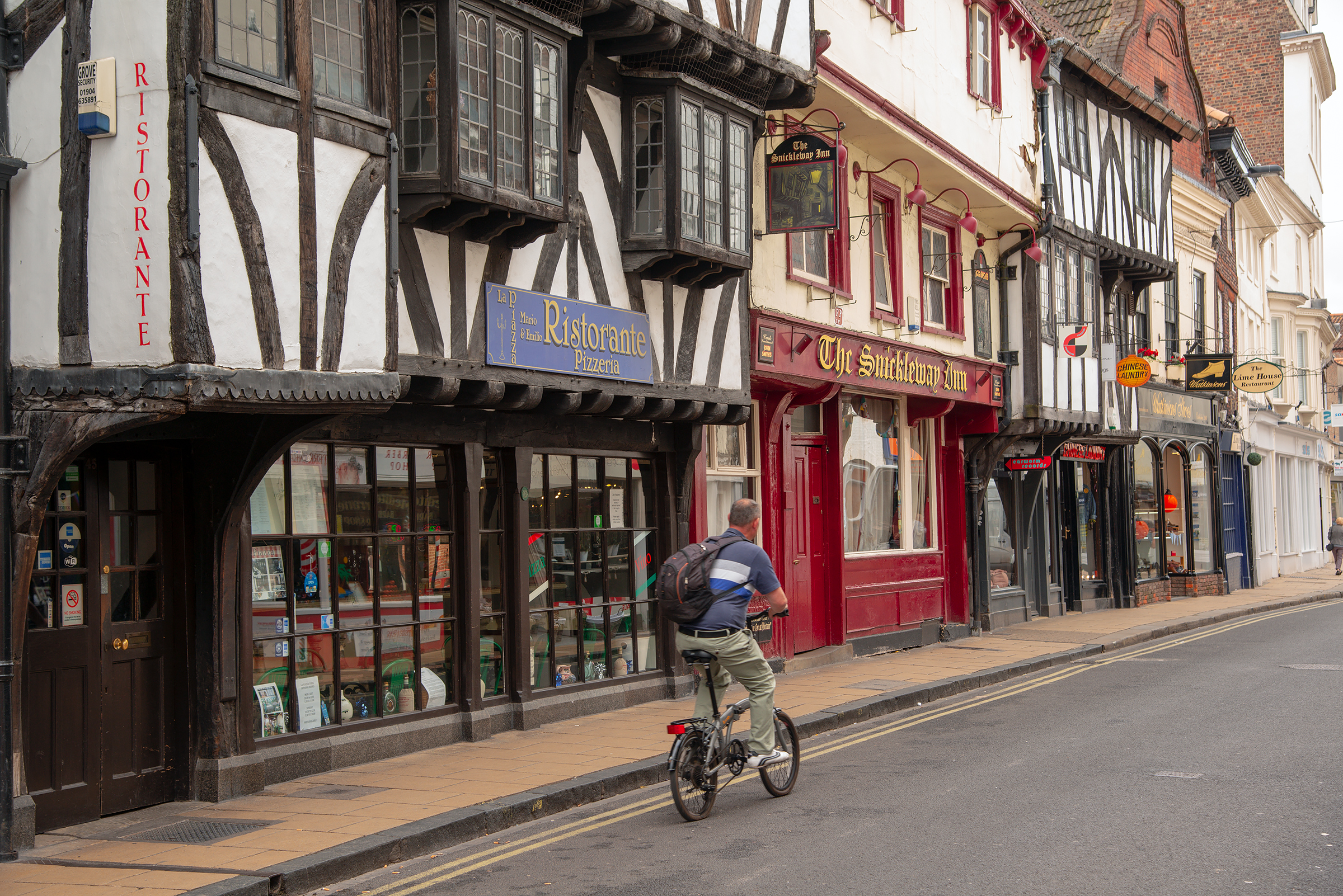
The Snickleway Inn [sic] uses the word for a small lane but is actually on Goodramgate

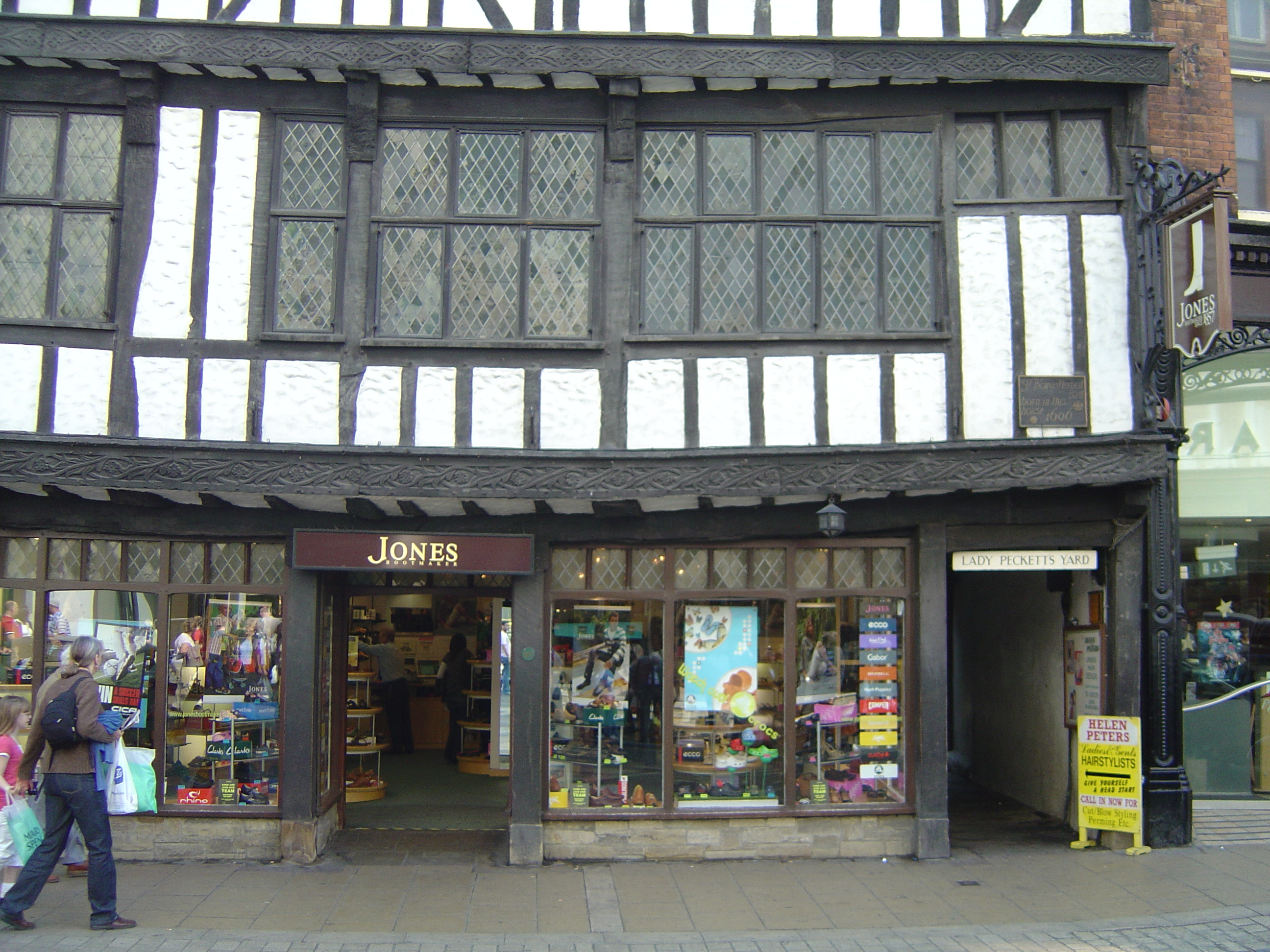
The entrance to Lady Peckett's Yard, leading through the buildings to the right of the shop

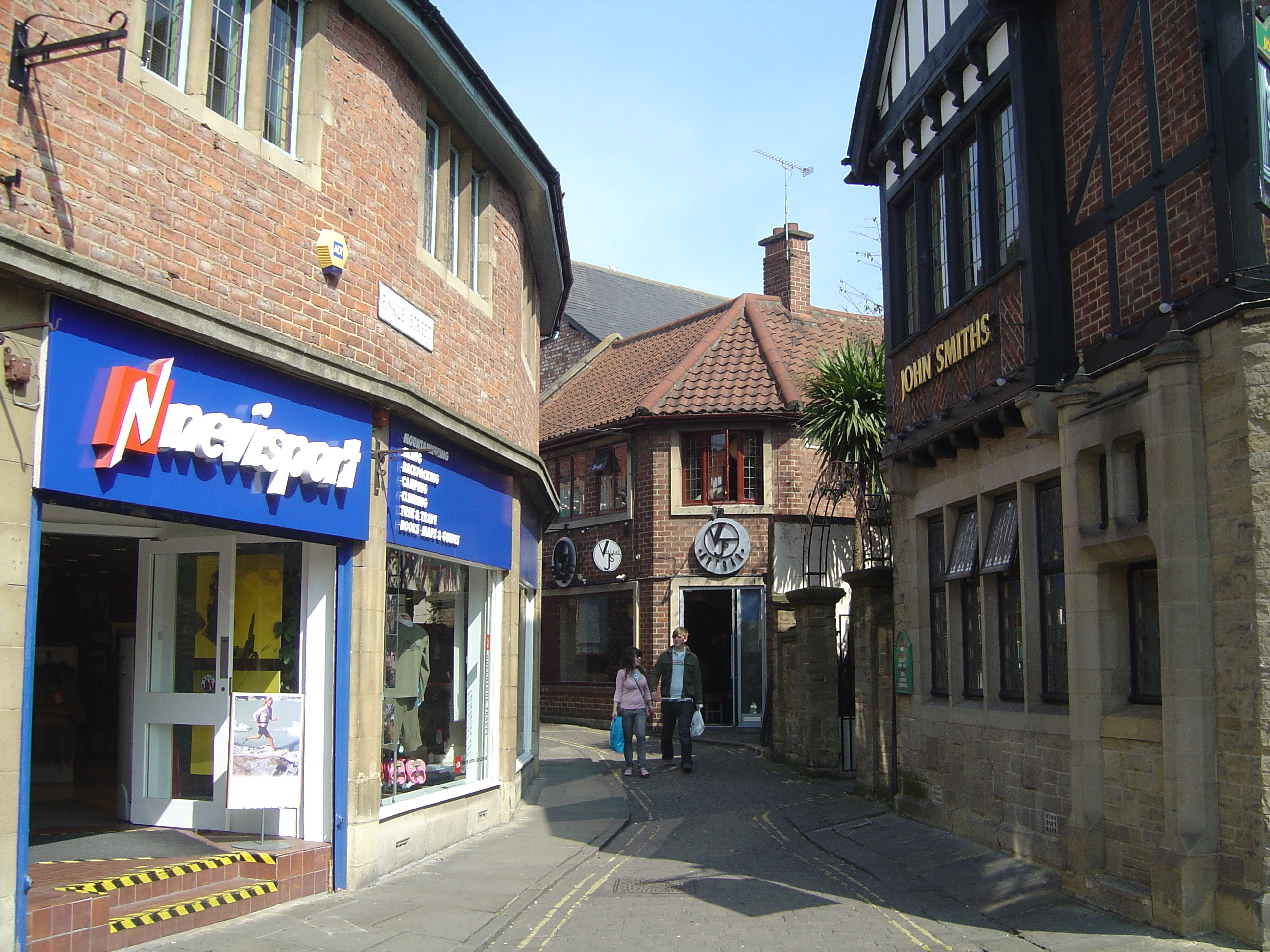
Finkle Street, its name possibly derived from Old Norse or Danish words meaning angle or bend

== See also ==
- Other terms for alley
- The Snickleway Inn
- Vennels of Perth
