= 30–32 Goodramgate and 11–12 College Street =

Listed buildings in York, England

30 and 32 Goodramgate and 11 and 12 College Street
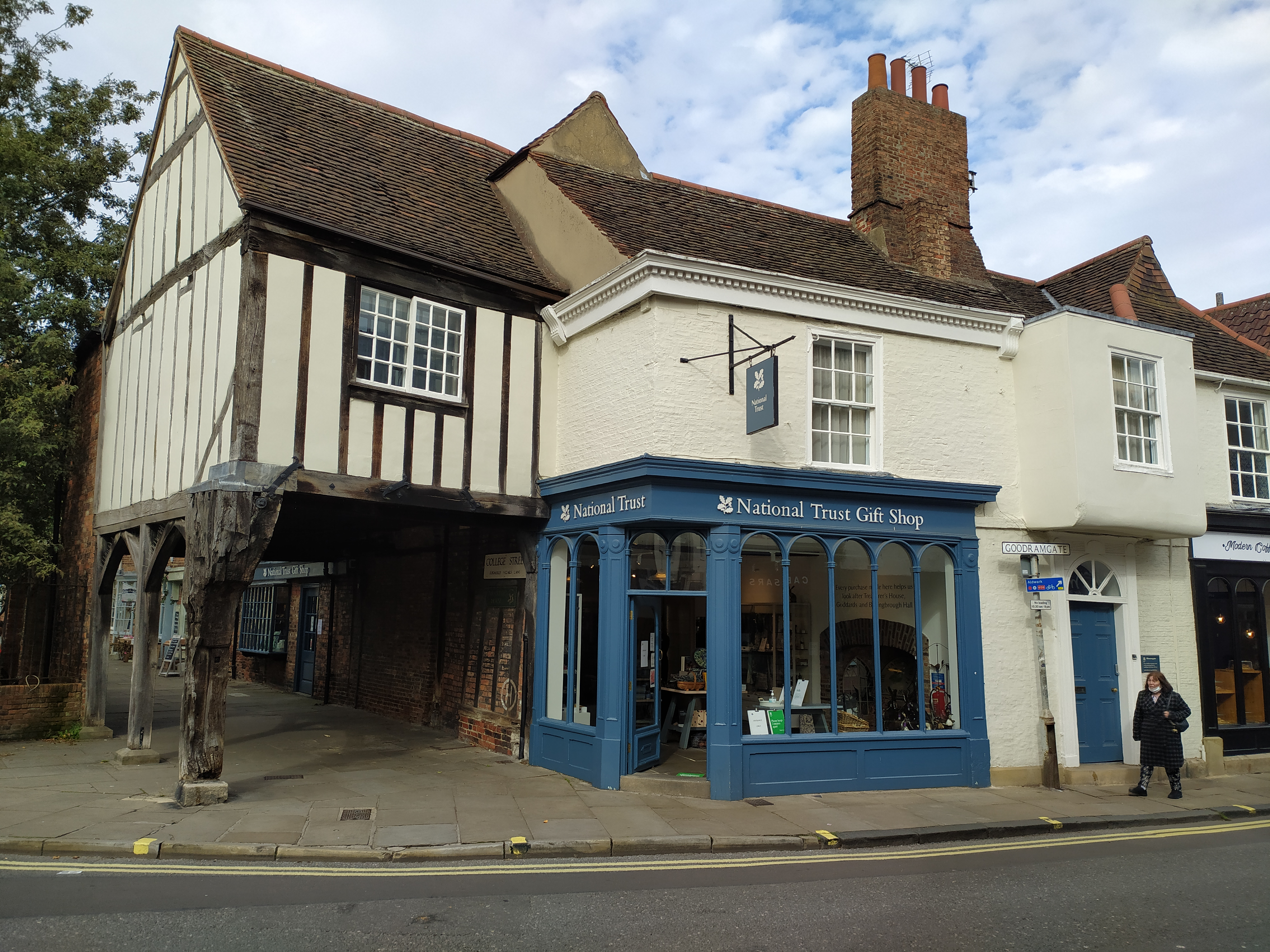
- Building as seen from Goodramgate 11 and 12 College Street

- Location within York City Centre

General information
- Location: Goodramgate and College Street, York, England
- Coordinates: 53°57′43″N 1°04′47″W
- Years built: College Street part: early 14th century Goodramgate part: 1380s–1390s
- Renovated: 18th and 19th centuries

Technical details
- Floor count: 2

Design and construction
- Designations

Listed Building – Grade II*
- Official name: 30 and 32, Goodramgate, 11 and 12, College Street
- Designated: 14 June 1954
- Reference no.: 1257731

30 and 32 Goodramgate and 11 and 12 College Street is a Grade II* listed building in the city centre of York, England.

The building lies on the corner of Goodramgate and College Street. The part facing College Street was constructed in the early 14th century, while the part facing Goodramgate was constructed in the 1380s or 1390s as part of a terrace of houses, replacing a large stone house which belonged to John le Romeyn. The structure also includes a gatehouse which is believed to represent an entrance to the medieval Minster Close, but which was completely rebuilt about 1600. The main parts of the building were altered in the 18th and 19th centuries, when much of the timber was replaced with brickwork.

By 1752, part of the building was in use as the Angel Inn. The Goodramgate façade is of two storeys and four bays, and includes a double-storey gatehouse built in the 18th century. The ground floor of the entire building is currently in use as shops and cafes, with part occupied by the National Trust. It was listed at Grade II* in 1954.

== See also ==
- Grade II* listed buildings in the City of York
- Listed buildings in York (within the city walls, northern part)
