= 5 Minster Yard =

Listed building in York, England

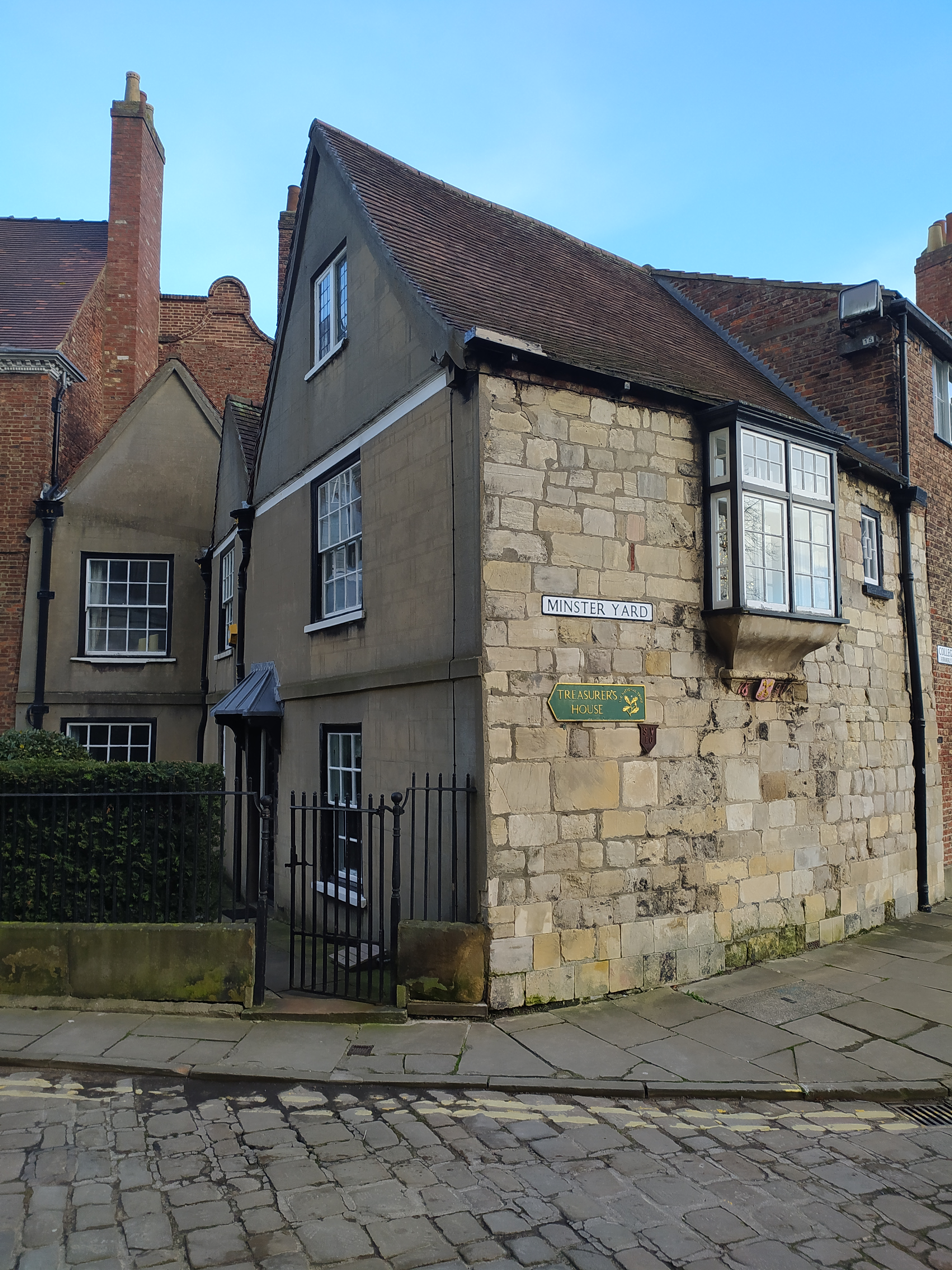
- The building in 2020

- Location within York City Centre

General information
- Location: Minster Yard, York, North Yorkshire, England
- Coordinates: 53.9624°N 1.0807°W
- Completed: c. 1300
- Renovated: 15th century (range added); 16th century (wing added); 19th century (altered)

Technical details
- Material: Timber framed, stone
- Floor count: 2 / 3

Design and construction
- Designations

Listed Building – Grade II*
- Official name: Number 5 and attached front garden railings
- Designated: 14 June 1954
- Reference no.: 1257255

5 Minster Yard is a Grade II* listed building in the city of York, England.

The building is wholly timber-framed and is located with its south side facing Minster Yard. It originated as part of a two-storey row of tenements, built about 1300, the row also having included what is now 2 College Street. From this period survive parts of some roof trusses and a rafter. The main range may have been rebuilt in about 1500. In about 1600, a large chimney stack was added, with a new staircase to its north, and a two-storey wing was added on the north side of the building.

The building was heavily altered in 1891, with its south wall rebuilt in stone, including a prominent oriel window. The west gable end was also rebuilt on a new alignment, and a third storey was added to the eastern half of the building. Internally, an entrance hall was created, and a new staircase added, reusing balusters from about 1700. The western first floor room has a fireplace surround and panelling dating from about 1600, and the eastern ground and first floor also have wooden panelling.

The building was listed in 1954, along with its garden railings and gate posts.

== See also ==
- Grade II* listed buildings in the City of York
- Listed buildings in York (within the city walls, northern part)
