= Wealden Hall, York =

Grade I listed building in York, England

Wealden Hall
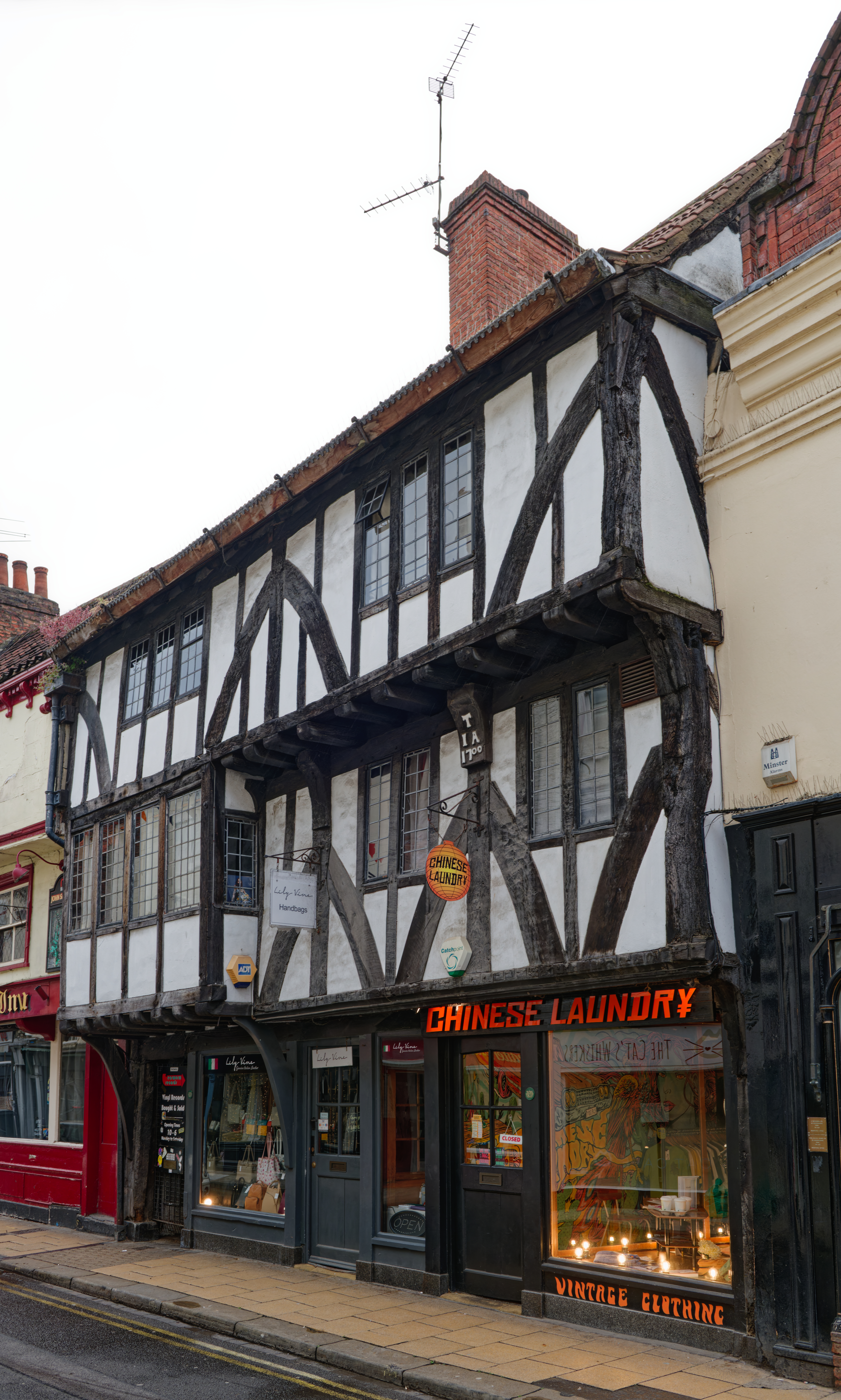
- The building in 2024

- Location within York Central

General information
- Location: Goodramgate, York, England
- Coordinates: 53.9614°N 1.0797°W
- Year built: c. 1500
- Renovated: 1930–31 (restored and extended)

Listed Building – Grade I
- Official name: The Wealden Hall
- Designated: 14 June 1954
- Reference no.: 1257745

The Wealden Hall is a Grade I listed building on Goodramgate in the city centre of York, England.

The building was constructed in about 1500. It is a Wealden hall house, which by the date was a common design in South East England but rare in York. The Wealden Hall and 1 Tanner Row, also in the city, are the two northernmost surviving examples of Wealden halls.

Using the standard Wealden hall design, the building originally had a central hall, with double-storey bays either side. In this case the design was end-on to the street, and, unusually, only the front bays were jettied. In front of the hall a three-storey range was constructed to face the street. Remains of two windows survive from the original construction, although they were originally unglazed and probably closed with shutters. The rear never had any openings, suggesting that it may have abutted another structure. The size of the house and its jettying suggest that it was built for a wealthy owner.

From the 16th century onwards, many alterations were made to the building: new walls and chimneys were added, attics were constructed and a first floor was inserted into the hall. The front of the building was plastered, probably in 1700, a date now inscribed on the front of the building. The eastern part of the front range became a separate building, now The Snickleway Inn.

In 1930 the building was bought by Cuthbert Morrell for restoration, which was conducted by the architect Harvey Rutherford. Among other changes he restored the hall to its former dimensions and removed the plaster from the street front to reveal the timber framing. The building now belongs to the York Conservation Trust and houses shops, with offices above. It has also been used for exhibitions, such as one in 2012 focusing on the culture of homelessness in the city.

== See also ==
- Grade I listed buildings in the City of York
- Listed buildings in York (within the city walls, northern part)
