= Old White Swan =

Listed pub in York, England

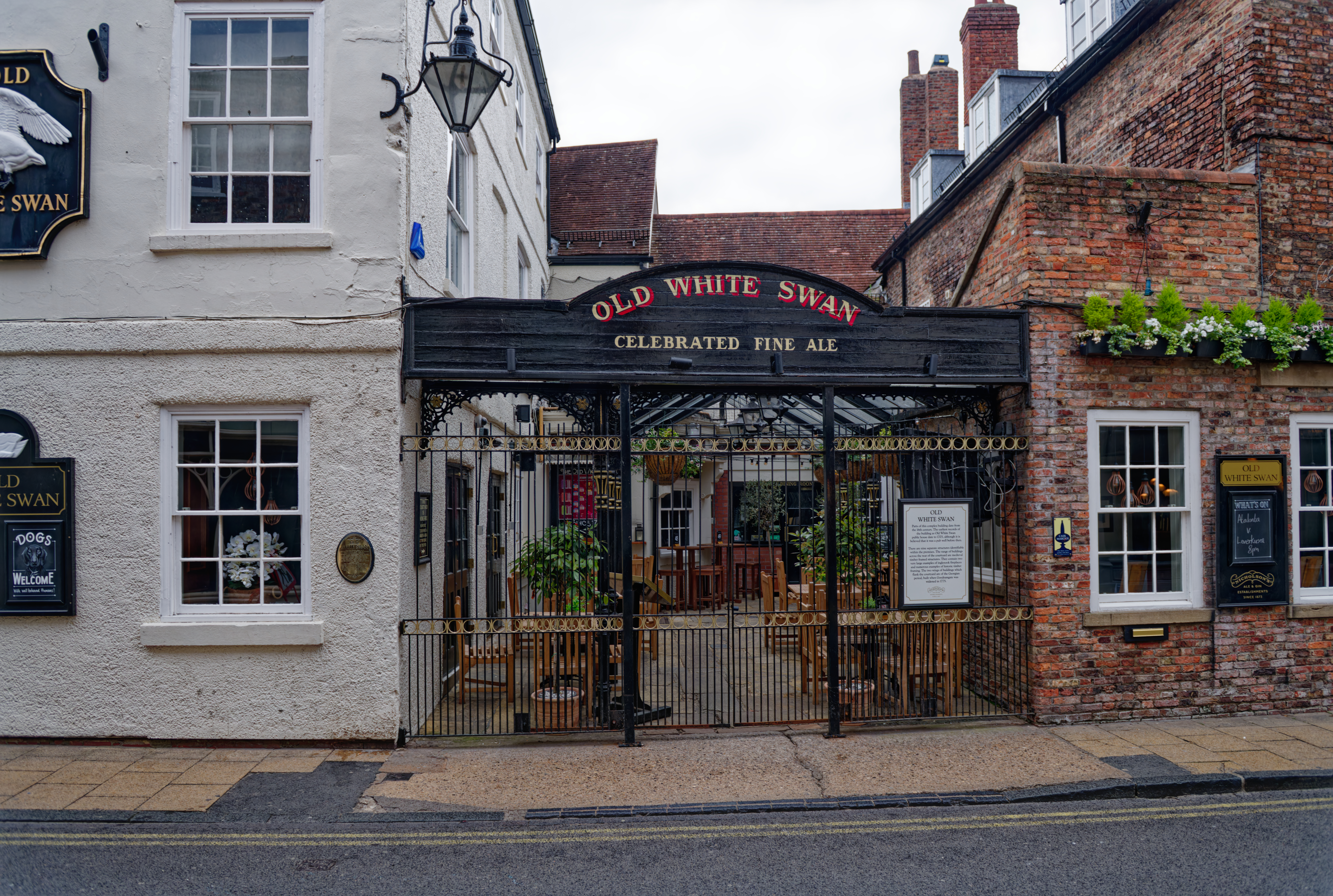
- The pub in 2024
- Former names: White Swan and Sandhill

General information
- Type: Public house
- Location: 76–80 Goodramgate, York, England
- Coordinates: 53°57′38″N 1°04′49″W
- Year built: Early 17th century
- Renovated: Mid and late 18th century (extended); 20th century (extended, altered and renovated)
- Owner: Mitchells & Butlers

Website
- Official website

Listed Building – Grade II
- Official name: The Old White Swan public house
- Designated: 19 August 1971
- Reference no.: 1257711

The Old White Swan is a historic public house in the city centre of York, England. The core of the building is timber-framed and was constructed in the early 17th century. It lay at the back of a coaching yard on the north-western side of Goodramgate, but with another entrance on Low Petergate. Underneath a glass panel in the floor is part of a Roman column, although this is not its original location.

The building was in use as an inn by 1703, making it the third-oldest pub in the city. In this period, part of the building lay in the parish of Holy Trinity King's Court, and part in the Holy Trinity Goodramgate parish. Both claimed the right to charge a rent for the pub, leading its landlord to paint a white line through the courtyard and kitchen, demarcating the boundary, and providing a justification for him to pay only partial rent to each parish. In 1723, the local constables decided to watch for possible Catholic activity in the pub, and spent £1 at the business while doing so — a substantial sum for the period.

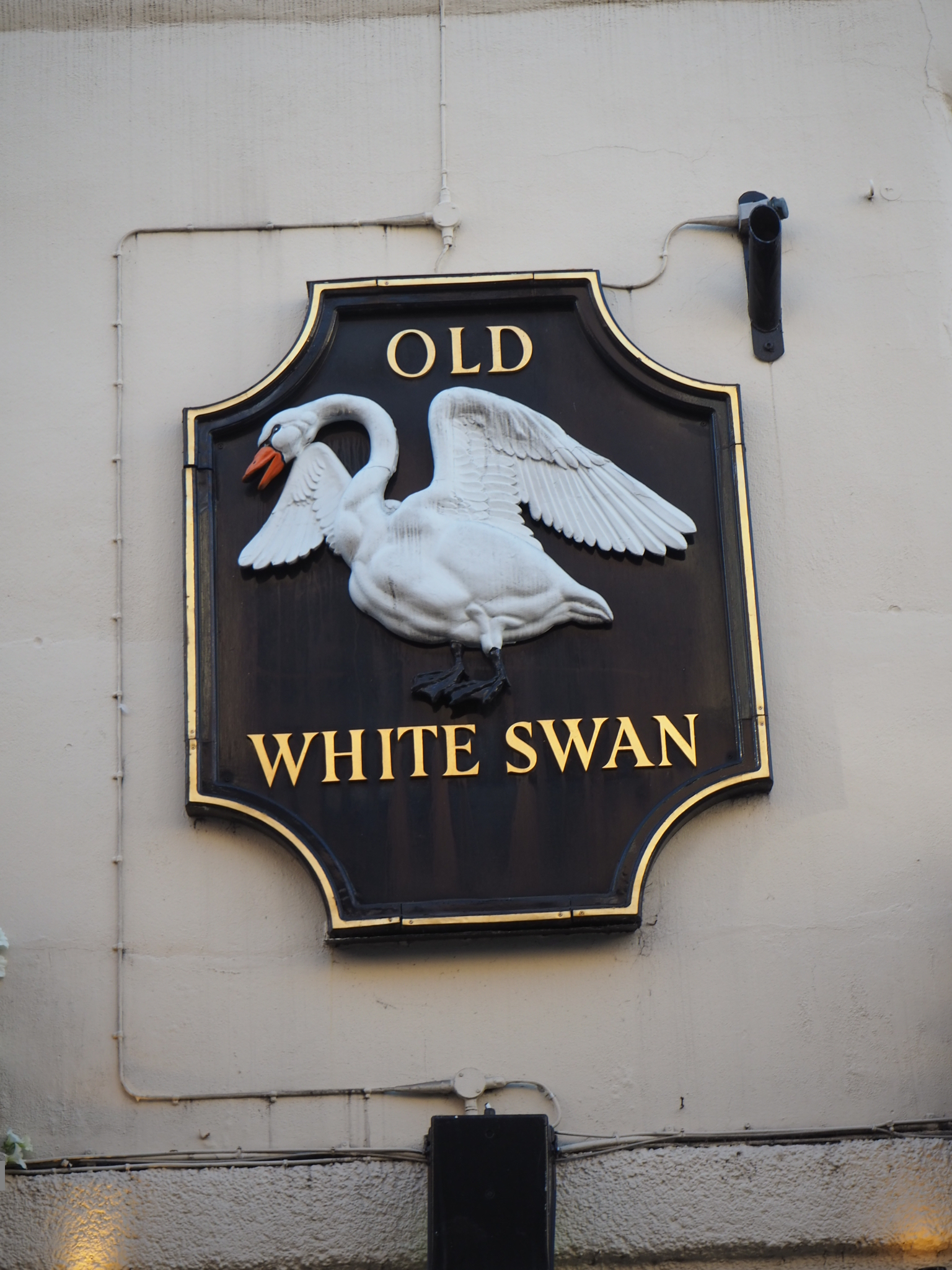
The pub sign

In 1742, the pub was renamed as the "White Swan and Sandhill", but the suffix was dropped again in 1786. Brick extensions were added to either side of the original building in the early and mid-18th century, and the frontage on Goodramgate was rebuilt in 1771, following which this became the principal entrance, with the one on Petergate eventually closed. The side wings were not initially used as part of the inn, but had uses including a barber shop, pigsty and hayloft. The courtyard was occasionally used to host a poultry market, while the pub hosted events including a display of Patrick Cotter O'Brien, claimed as the world's tallest man, and an attempt by a man to eat ten pounds of tripe.

In the late 18th and early 19th century, the inn was the starting point for several stagecoach routes, including one to Glasgow via Durham and Newcastle, and shorter ones to Easingwold and Helperby. A mounting block in the courtyard survives from this period. John Ward Knowles painted a stained glass sign for the pub in 1846, variations on which have been its logo since. In 1885, the pub was renamed as the "Old White Swan", to emphasise its long history.

In 1971, the pub was Grade II listed. A tradition holds that the pub is haunted by the ghosts of a group of Catholics planning an escape to France, who are said to rearrange chairs in a circle and relight a fire overnight.

== See also ==
- Listed buildings in York (within the city walls, northern part)
