= The Snickleway Inn =

Listed pub in York, England

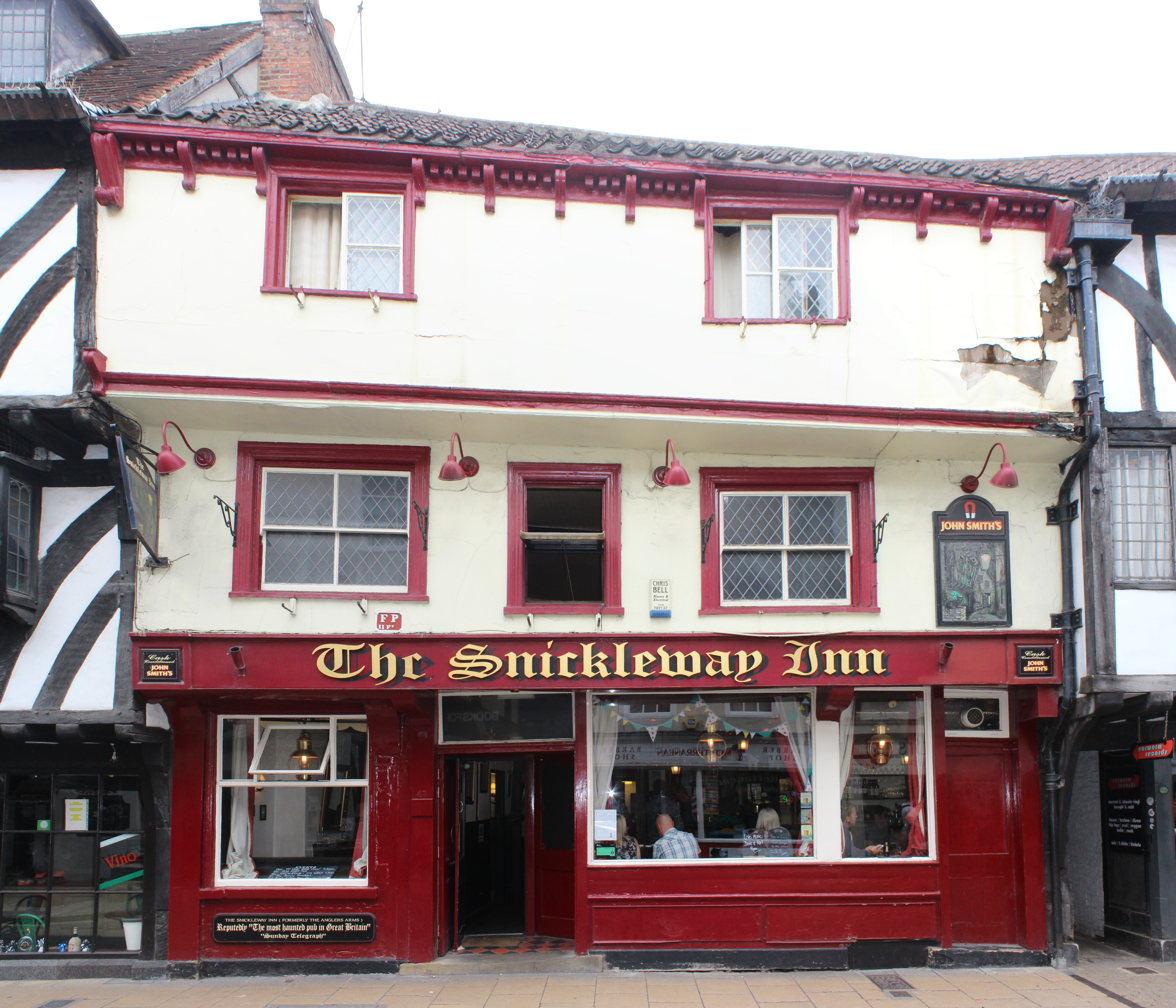
- The pub in 2018
- Former names: Painters' Arms; Square and Compasses; Mason's Arms; The Board; Joiner's Arms; Anglers' Arms

General information
- Type: Public house; originally a house
- Location: 47 Goodramgate, York, England
- Coordinates: 53°57′41″N 1°04′47″W
- Completed: c. 1500; 526 years ago c. 1600 (outbuilding)
- Renovated: Early 17th century (wing added); Mid-19th century (altered and pub front)

Technical details
- Floor count: 3

Design and construction
- Designations

Listed Building – Grade II*
- Official name: The Snickleway Inn and attached buildings at rear
- Designated: 14 June 1954
- Reference no.: 1257742

The Snickleway Inn is a Grade II* listed public house in the city centre of York, England.

The pub lies on Goodramgate, next to the Wealden Hall. The oldest part is the front section of the building, constructed about 1500, at the same time as the neighbouring hall. It has three storeys and is four bays wide. In the 17th century a wing was added, and in the mid-19th century this was altered, while the building was refronted. To the rear, there is an outbuilding, which was constructed in about 1600, and has been extensively rebuilt in several phases. The whole building is timber-framed throughout, with some brick infill, while the front is plastered over.

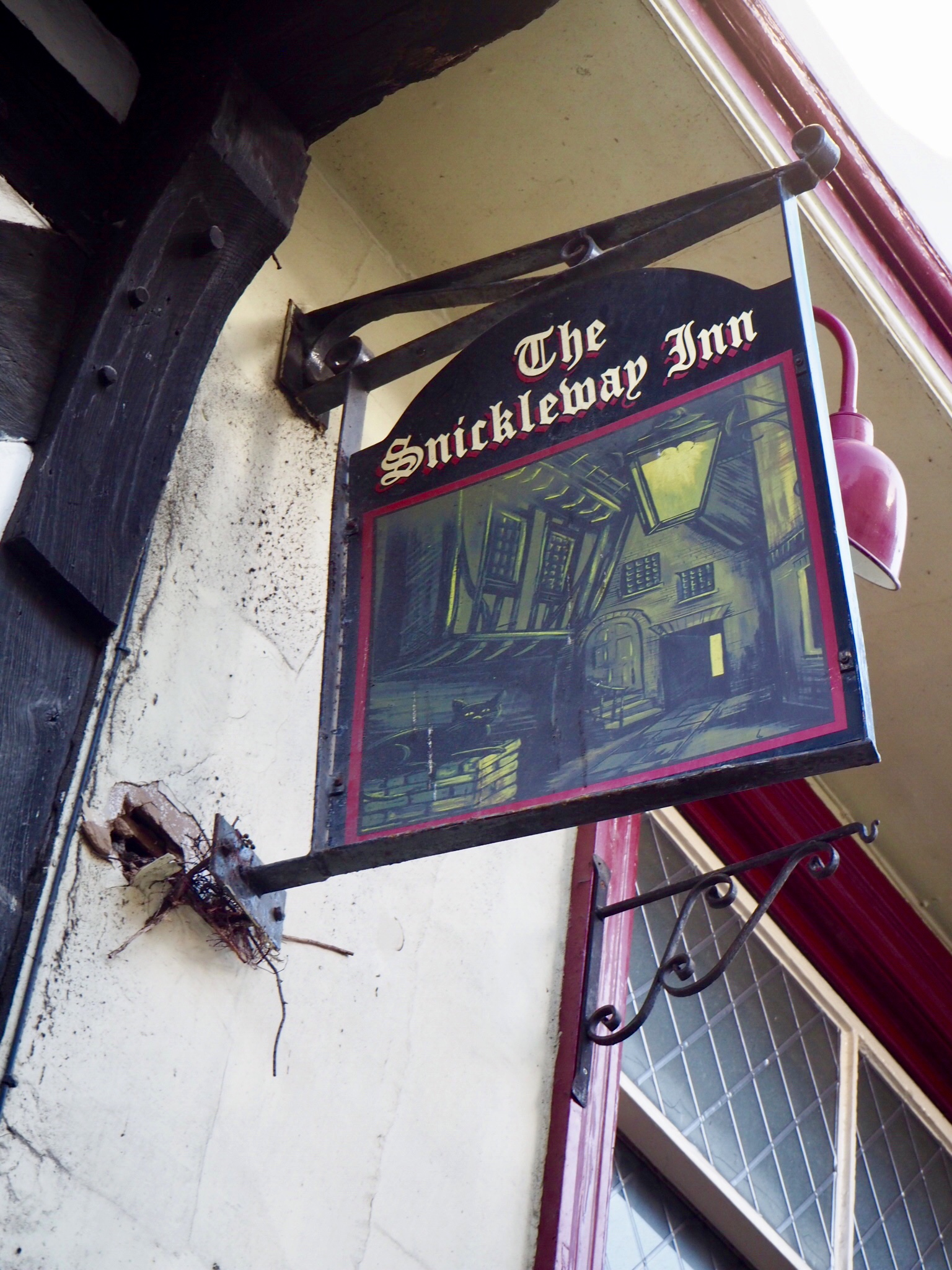
The sign above the entrance

The building has been used as a pub from at least the 18th century. It was originally named the "Painters' Arms", then successively became the "Square and Compasses" (c. 1818), the "Mason's Arms" (c. 1823), "The Board" (c. 1841) and the "Joiner's Arms" (c. 1851). By 1872, it was renamed as the "Anglers' Arms". In 1994, while Frank Cartin was the landlord, it was renamed as "The Snickleway Inn", referencing the snickelways of York, but deliberately misspelling the word, to avoid copyright issues.

The York Press named the pub as one of the five most haunted in the city, claiming that it is home to five spirits, including Mrs Tulliver and her cat, Seamus. Another ghost is said to be Marmaduke Buckle, a disabled man who lived in the early 18th century, who committed suicide while living in the property.

== See also ==
- Grade II* listed buildings in the City of York
- Listed buildings in York (within the city walls, northern part)
