= Augustus Duncombe =

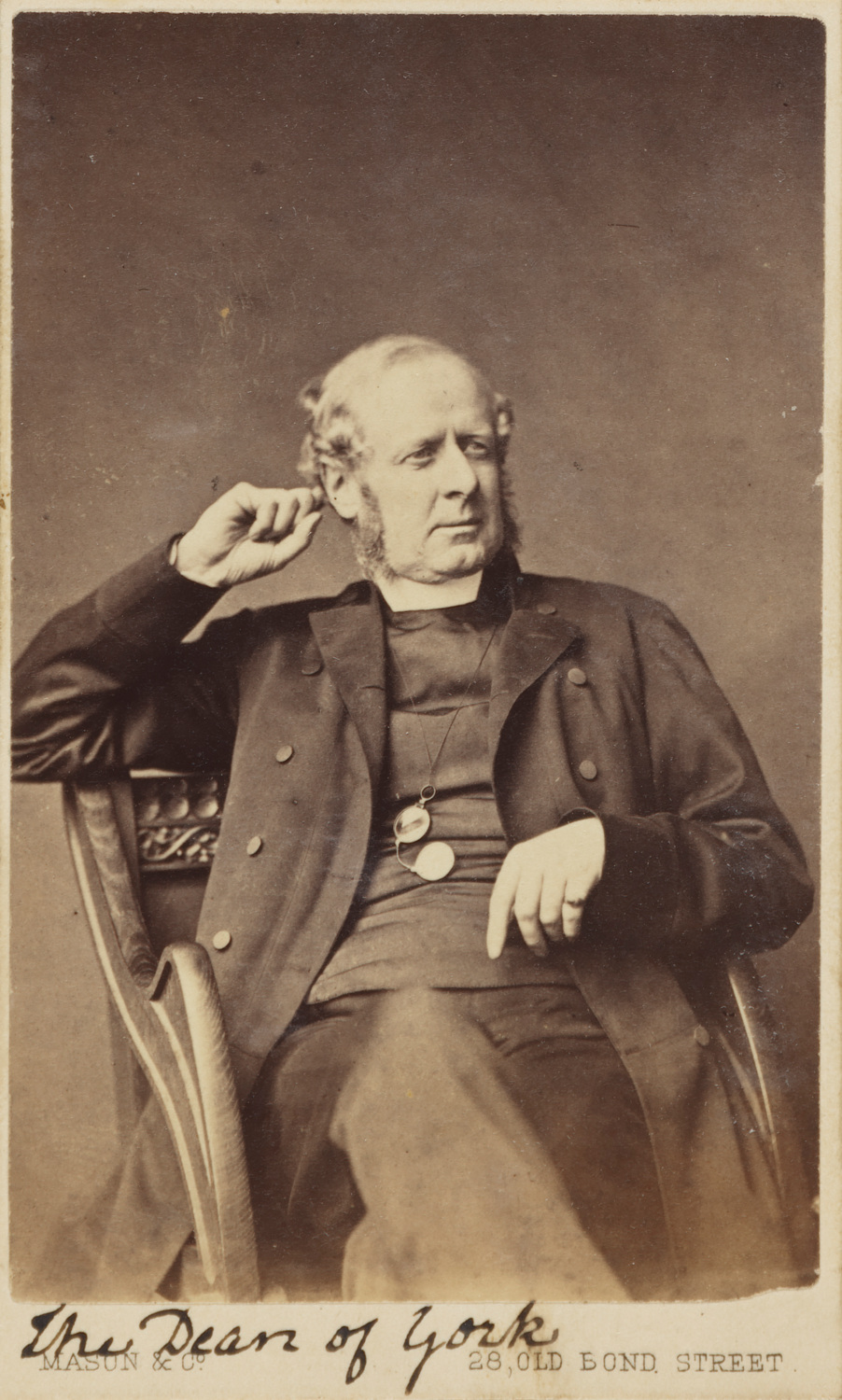
A photograph of Augustus Duncombe, with the text "The Dean of York" written in pen in the bottom margin.

Augustus Duncombe (2 November 1814 – 26 January 1880) was Dean of York from 1858 until his death.

== Biography ==
Duncombe was born the seventh child and fifth son of Charles Duncombe, 1st Baron Feversham, and educated at Worcester College, Oxford. He was Rector of Kirby Misperton, then Prebendary of Bole, before his appointment as Dean. During his tenure, the approach to York Minster from the south-west was widened by the construction (via the demolition of Minster Close) of a spacious approach. It was named Duncombe Place in his honour.

== Marriage and children ==
Duncombe married, on 13 May 1841, Lady Harriet Christian Douglas, the second child of Charles Douglas, 6th Marquess of Queensberry, and founder, in 1870, of York's St Stephen's Orphanage. Lady Harriet died in London on 26 July 1902, at the age of 93. They had three daughters and two sons:

- Major Alfred Charles Duncombe, JP (1843–1925), who was High Sheriff of Staffordshire in 1883; married Lady Anne Florence Adelaide Montagu (d.1940), daughter of the 7th Earl of Sandwich; and died without issue.
- Major Adolphus Montagu Duncombe, JP (1852–1904), Yorkshire Hussars; married Beatrice Dorothy Mary Bridgeman-Simpson (d.1936), daughter of Rev. William Bridgman-Simpson by Lady Frances Laura Wentworth Fitzwilliam (who was a daughter of the 5th Earl FitzWilliam); and died without issue.

Church of England titles
Preceded by William Cockburn	Dean of York; 1858–1880	Succeeded by Arthur Percival Purey-Cust
