= Goodramgate =

Street in York, England

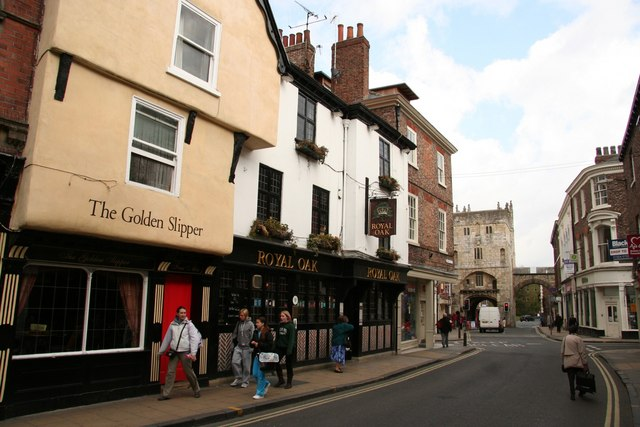
- View east along Goodramgate, to Monk Bar
- Location within York
- Location: York, England
- Postal code: YO
- Coordinates: 53.9615°N 1.0798°W
- South west end: King's Square
- Major junctions: College Green; Deangate; Ogleforth; Aldwark; Bedern
- North east end: Monkgate

Goodramgate is a street in the city centre of York, England.

== History ==
The area now covered by Goodramgate lay within the walls of Roman Eboracum. The street runs diagonally across the line of former Roman buildings, from the Porta Decumana (now King's Square) to the Porta Principalis Sinistra (now Monk Bar). Anglo-Saxon artefacts have been found in the area, while its name dates from the Viking Jorvik era, being derived from someone called "Guthrum" or "Gutherun".

The street was first recorded in about 1180. In the medieval period, it lay in the parish of Holy Trinity Church, although since 1316 the church has been hidden from the street behind Lady Row. The precinct of York Minster lay immediately north of Goodramgate, and until the early 19th century was entered through a gateway; part of this may survive in the rebuilt structure at the entrance to College Street. The original site of the York Dominican Friary may have been on the street, although it moved to Toft Green in 1227. By this time, the street contained some large stone houses associated with wealthy merchants.

Many medieval buildings survive on the street, although some were destroyed when its south-western end was widened in 1771, or when Deangate was constructed in 1906. Several non-conformist churches have existed on Goodramgate, including the Methodist Monk Bar Chapel, while the former lecture hall was used by Baptists and then Presbyterians. Sanderson's Temperance Hotel, later the Victoria Hotel, was used by the Swedenborgians and the Primitive Methodists.

The street has long been a centre for retail, with a market created in 1502 for beds, mattresses and upholstery. It is now lined with shops, bars and restaurants, including two small supermarkets built in the 1960s.

== Layout and architecture ==
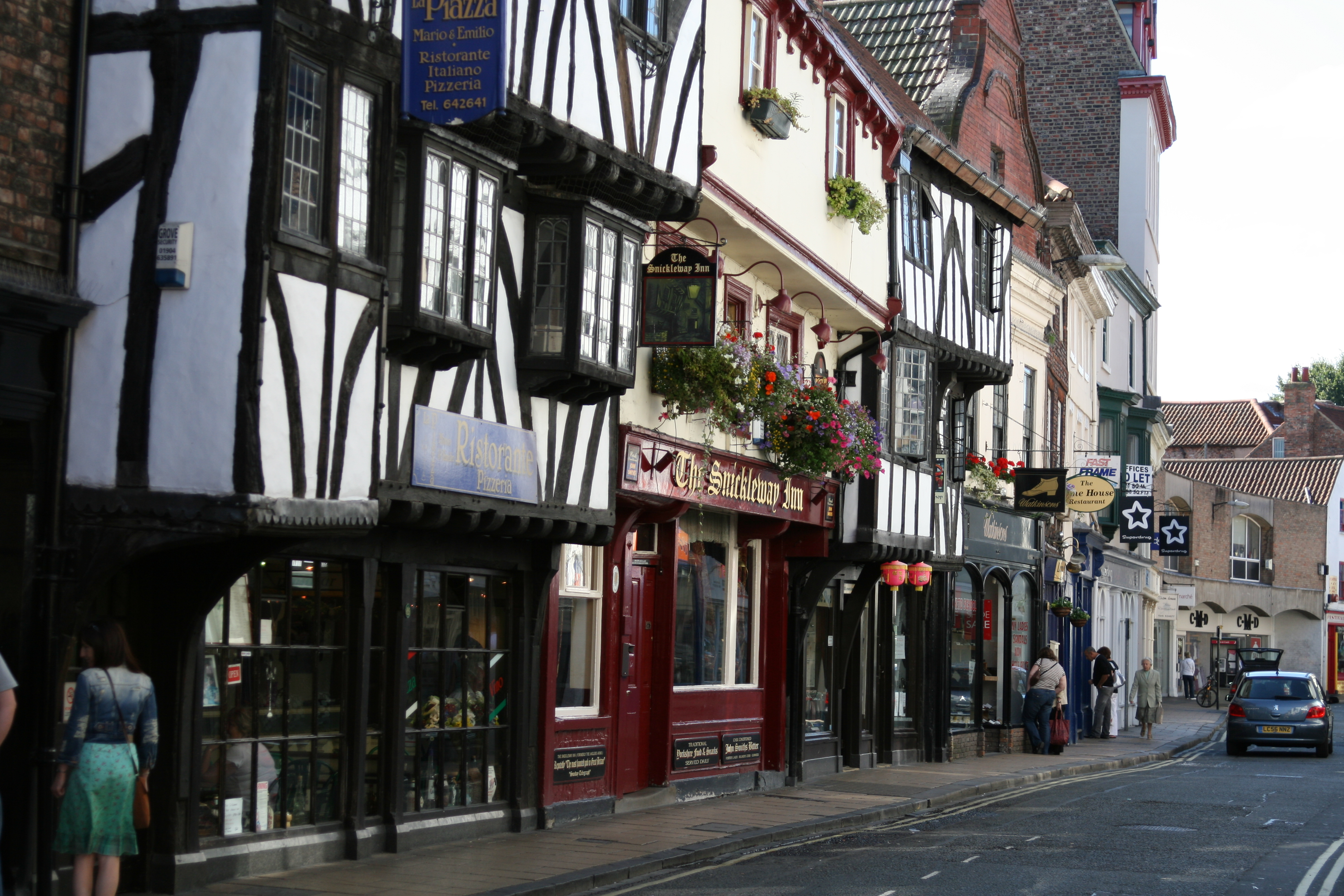
View west along Goodramgate

The street runs north-east from the northern tip of King's Square, where it meets Church Street and Low Petergate, to Monk Bar on the York city walls, beyond which its continuation is Monkgate. College Green lies off the north-western side of the street, where it meets Deangate and College Street. Ogleforth and the snickelway Monk Bar Court also lead off the north-western side, while Aldwark, Bedern, and Powells Yard lead off the south-eastern side.

Notable buildings on the south-east side of the street include the late-19th-century Nos. 1–3; No. 5, a former chapel built in 1858; No. 7, Nos. 9–11, and Nos. 13–15, all from the mid-19th-century; the 16th-century No. 17; No. 19, from around 1700; the mid-18th-century No. 21; No. 23, from about 1800; No. 25, with 16th-century origins; the early 19th-century No. 29; Nos. 31–33, of probable medieval origin; the mid-18th-century No. 39; Nos. 41–45, The Snickleway Inn at No. 47, and Wealden Hall at Nos. 49–51, all built around 1500; the late-17th-century No. 53, partly rebuilt around 1900; the early-18th-century Nos. 55–57A, the late-18th-century No. 57; Nos. 59–61, from about 1700; No. 77 and No. 81, both with 18th-century origins; and the 19th-century No. 83 and Nos. 85–89.

On the north-west side stand Nos. 2–4 from 1845; Nos. 6–10, with 17th-century origins; No. 14 and No. 16, both from the early 18th century; The Royal Oak at No. 18, with probable 15th-century origins; The Golden Slipper at No. 20, built around 1500; 17th-century houses at No. 22 and No. 24; Nos. 30–32, with parts dating from the 1380s; the Cross Keys pub at No. 34, built in 1904; the mid-19th-century No. 36; Nos. 38–40, with probable 15th-century origins; the 19th-century No. 42, No. 44 and No. 46; No. 48, from about 1700; the late-19th-century No. 50; No. 54 and Nos. 56–58, from the 18th century; Lady Row at Nos. 60–72, with Holy Trinity Church behind, both Grade I-listed; the Old White Swan at Nos. 76–80, with a 16th-century core; and the 18th-century No. 82.
