= Bedern =

Street in York, England

Coordinates: 53.9616°N 1.0785°W

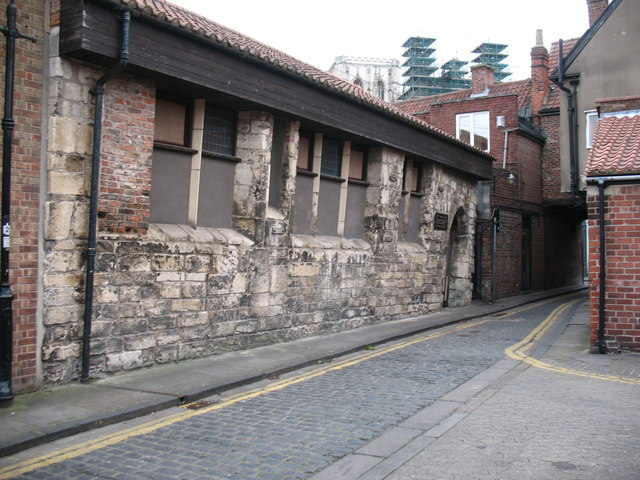
Bedern Chapel

Bedern is a street in the city centre of York, England, which originated as a college for the vicars choral of York Minster.

== History ==
The Bedern College was founded in 1252, to house 36 vicars choral associated with York Minster. The name "Bedern" meant "house of prayer", and was in use by 1270. It was funded by three grants of land in Yorkshire, one in Hampshire, and the rents of 200 houses in York. It was built on land associated with somebody named Ulphus, which was donated by William of Laneham. The buildings consisted of small houses, a chapel, and a dining hall with kitchens, a buttery and a brewhouse, all built around a green. There was also a record room, and behind the buildings lay a garden and an orchard. In 1396, the site was improved by the construction of a latrine, and a bridge across Goodramgate, so that the vicars could enter the Minster Close without crossing the public street.

In 1574, the vicars stopped dining together, and from 1640, the dining hall was leased out. The college was dissolved during the Commonwealth of England, but reformed afterwards. There were aborted plans to establish a university in the college buildings, while from 1644 until 1730, St Peter's School occupied many of them. By 1700, only five of the houses were occupied by vicars, and during the following century, the houses were replaced by newer buildings, while the latrine was rebuilt as a stable.

By the mid-19th century, the street was one of the poorest in the city. Its population had risen to more than 300, and it was largely occupied by recent Irish emigrants. In 1853, the street was extended to the south-east, to reach St Andrewgate. In 1883, the houses on the north-east side, three of which had Dutch gables, were demolished and replaced by the Ebor Buildings and Hawarden Place, but these in turn were demolished in the 1970s.

== Layout and architecture ==
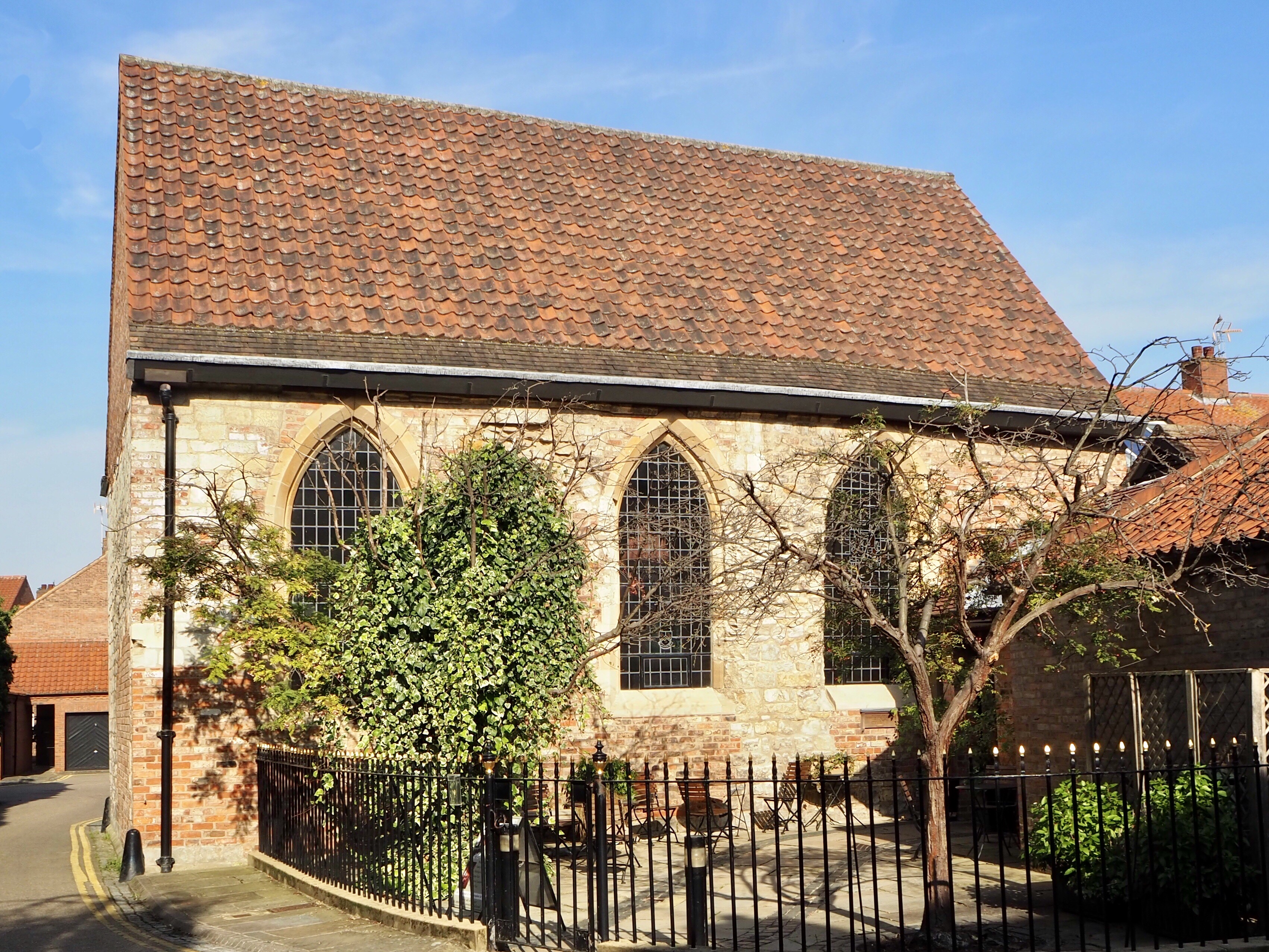
Bedern Hall

The street runs south-east, from Goodramgate to St Andrewgate, accessed at each end via a passageway through 25 Goodramgate. Bartle Garth joins its south-western side.

Two buildings from the college survive: Bedern Hall, and Bedern Chapel. They are both Grade II* listed buildings, and both lie on the south-west side of the street.

=== Bedern Chapel ===
Bedern Chapel was built around 1252, out of Magnesian Limestone. Internally, it is a single space; a gallery was later added but subsequently removed. Two of the vicars choral, Thomas de Otteby and William Cotyngham, paid for it to be enlarged in the 1340s. The north wall was demolished and rebuilt further north, to make the building larger, and the windows were altered in the east and south walls. In 1393, a new marble altar was consecrated.

In the 17th century, the chapel became dilapidated, and its east gable was mostly rebuilt in brick. The chapel was renovated in 1757, and in 1787 a new bell was added. The chapel was damaged in a fire in 1819, and the windows in its north wall were then bricked up. The building was repaired in 1831, but by 1859 it was again in disrepair. By 1925, its north wall was leaning and had to be stabilised. In 1961, its roof was removed and the walls were lowered, the materials being stacked inside and the building being left as a ruin. It was later restored, and has since housed the York Glaziers' Trust.

=== Bedern Hall ===
Bedern Hall is thought to date from the mid-14th century. Its north-west and end walls are of limestone and date from this period, although they incorporate some reused 12th-century stones. The south-east wall was later rebuilt in brick, but retains some 14th-century timber framing above. Its scissor-truss roof also survives. The hall had a service wing to the south east, including a pantry, buttery and, connected by a passageway, a kitchen. This wing was demolished in 1879.

After the dissolution of the college, the hall served in turn as a butcher's, a baker's, and a pork pie maker's curing hall. By the 1960s, the hall was derelict. Its site was excavated by the York Archaeological Trust in 1977, and in 1984, the hall was restored and an extension was added. It is now jointly owned by the Company of Cordwainers, the Gild of Freemen and the York Guild of Building, and served as a venue for community events, conferences and weddings. In May 2021, the venue began opening regularly to the public, with exhibitions and tours showcasing the heritage of the area.

== See also ==
- Grade II* listed buildings in the City of York
- Listed buildings in York (within the city walls, northern part)
