= Deangate =

Street in York, England

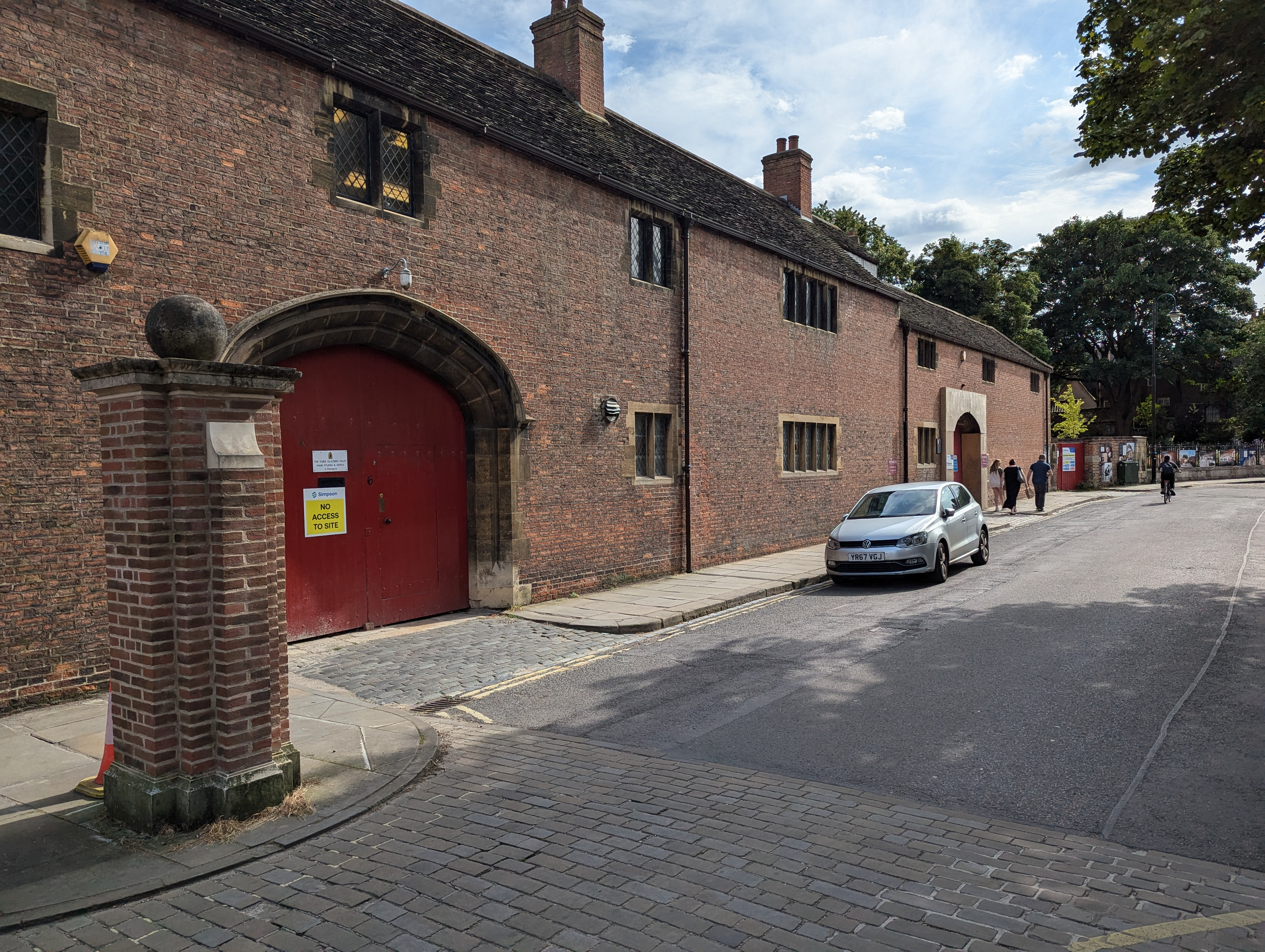
- The Minster Stoneyard on Deangate
- Location within York
- Maintained by: City of York
- Location: York, England
- Coordinates: 53.9617°N 1.0806°W
- East: College Street; Goodramgate
- West: Minster Yard

Construction
- Completion: 1903

Deangate is a street in the city centre of York, England, connecting College Street and Goodramgate with Minster Yard. It was created in 1903.

The street runs east from the middle of Minster Yard to the junction of Goodramgate and College Street. It was constructed as the last part of a scheme to open up traffic flow in the former Minster Precinct. It was given the suffix "-gate" to match many of the older streets in the city. It was designated as part of the A64 road. It became increasingly busy, and by the 1980s was carrying 2,000 vehicles per hour past York Minster, causing damage to its structure and noise pollution. The York Civic Trust launched a campaign to pedestrianise the street, which succeeded in 1991.

The street mostly runs around the side and back of buildings on other streets, with the main structure on the street being the stone yard of the minster.
