= The Royal Oak, York =

Listed pub in York, England

The Royal Oak
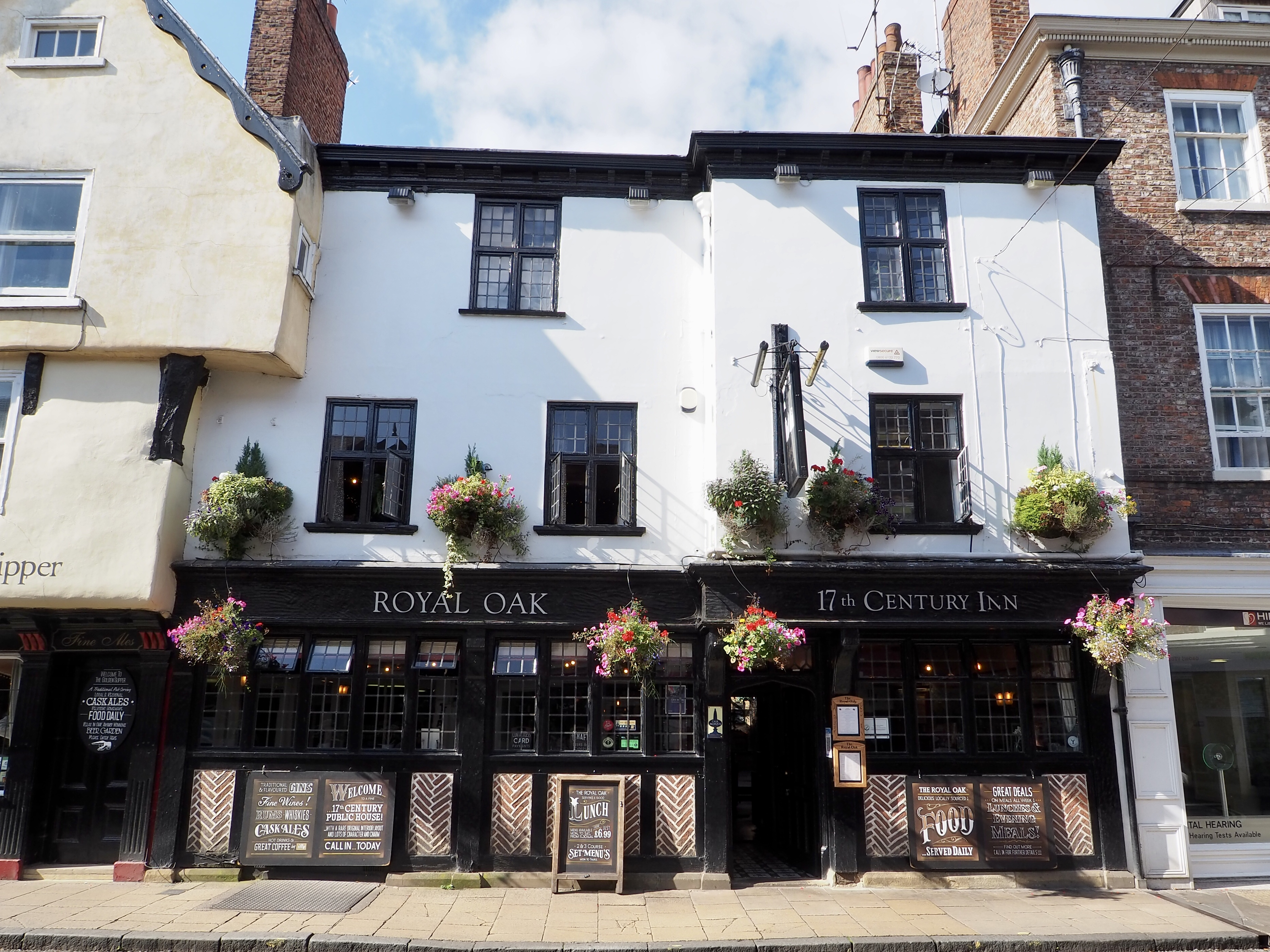
- The pub in 2021
- Former names: Blue Pigg; Blue Boar

General information
- Type: Public house
- Location: 18 Goodramgate, York, England
- Coordinates: 53.9623°N 1.0791°W
- Year built: 15th century (probable)

Website
- royaloakyork.pub

Listed Building – Grade II
- Official name: The Royal Oak public house
- Designated: 1 July 1968
- Reference no.: 1257763

The Royal Oak is a public house on Goodramgate in the city centre of York, England.

The building is believed to date from the 15th century and is largely timber-framed, although much of it has been rebuilt. The north-eastern section is of three storeys and contains one original internal wall, while the south-western section was originally a single-storey hall and contains part of one original partition wall, plus a reset medieval beam.

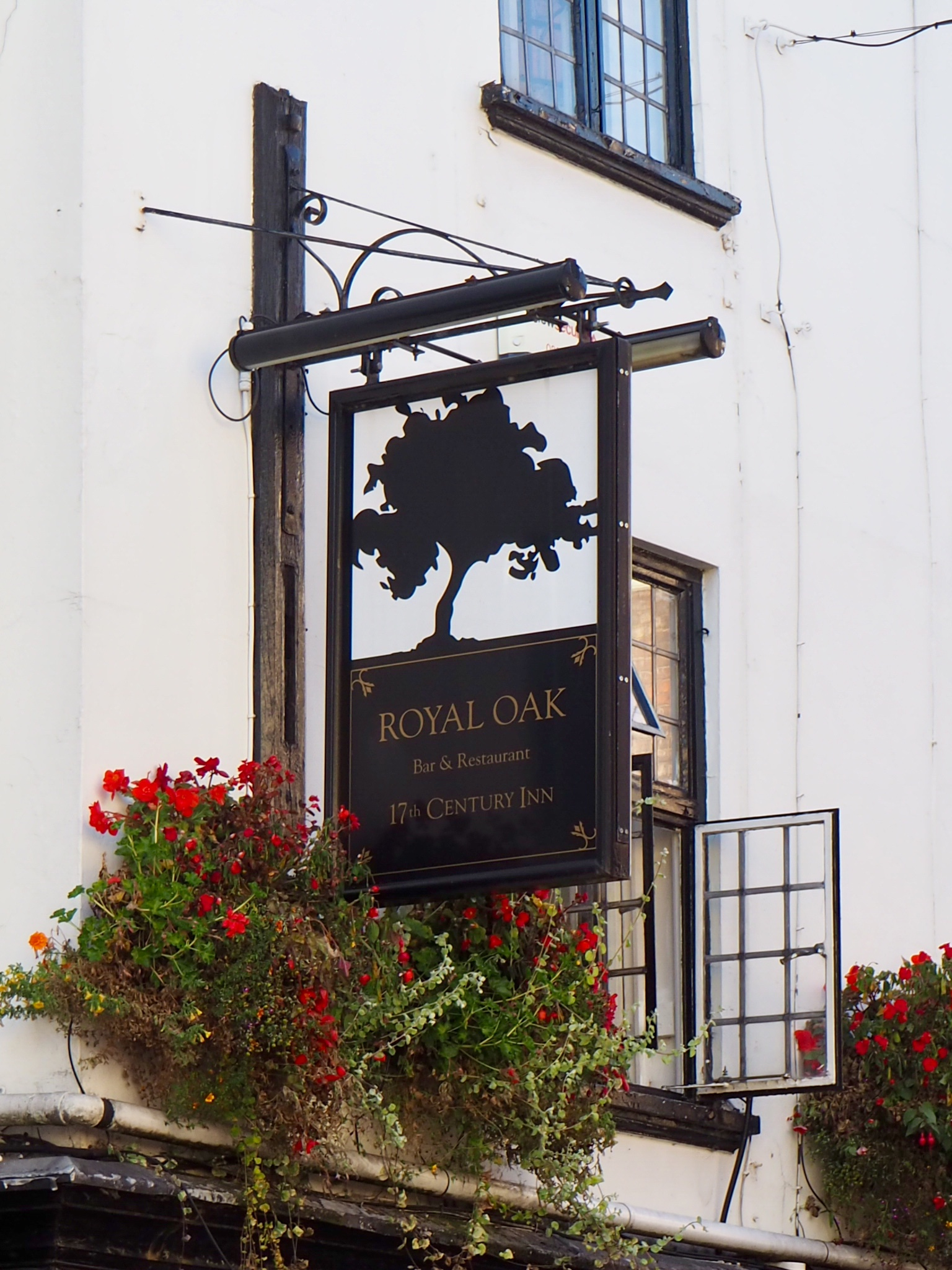
The sign above the entrance

In the 18th century, the north-eastern section was extended to the rear, in brick. Many of the features of the upper floors date from this period, including the staircase. A second storey was added to the south-western section in the 19th century, while in 1934 the ground floor was refurbished, with a new frontage, in the Brewer's Tudor style.

The building was a pub by 1772, when it was known as the Blue Pigg. It later became known as the Blue Boar, and has been the Royal Oak since 1819. From 1894, it was owned by the local John J. Hunt Brewery, while in the mid-20th century, it was acquired by Camerons Brewery.

== See also ==
- Listed buildings in York (within the city walls, northern part)
