= St William's College =

Grade I listed building in York, England

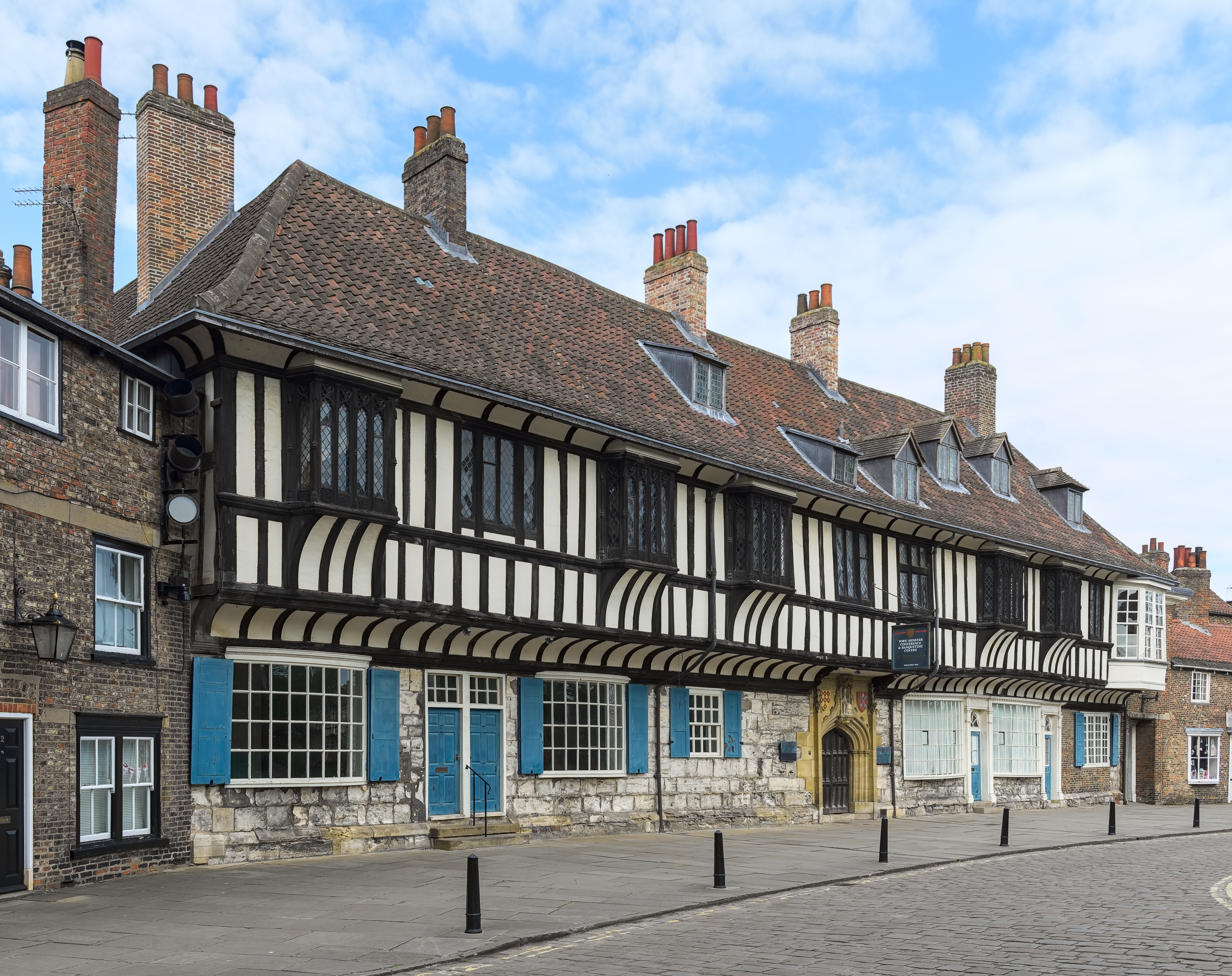

- Location within York Central

General information
- Location: College Street, York, England
- Coordinates: 53.96237°N 1.08012°W
- Year built: c. 1465
- Renovated: Mid-17th century (altered); Early 18th century (remodelled); Late 18th and early 19th century (converted); 1902 (restored)

Technical details
- Floor count: 2 + attic

Design and construction
- Designations

Listed Building – Grade I
- Official name: St Williams College
- Designated: 14 June 1954
- Reference no.: 1258028

St William's College is a medieval building on College Street in York, England, originally built to provide accommodation for priests attached to chantry chapels at nearby York Minster. It is a Grade I listed building.

The college was founded in 1460 by George Neville and the Earl of Warwick to house 23 priests and a provost. It was named after St William of York.

In 1465, work started on the present building. This courtyard structure may incorporate parts of two earlier houses. It included a great hall to the north, with a chapel to its east. The hall survives in part, but its ceiling has been lowered and the plasterwork was replaced in 1910. The posts of a screens passage also remain, the other side of which is the fireplace of the original kitchen. It has been suggested that doorways led off the courtyard to staircases, with rooms for the provost and fellows of the college leading off them. While the college was not a monastic establishment, it was affected by the Dissolution of the Monasteries, as in 1548, the building was converted to a substantial house, with later tenants including Charles Howard, 3rd Earl of Carlisle. Around this time, a single main staircase was added, which survives, while a room to the south-west has remains of wall paintings from this era. In the 17th century, the "Bishop's Chamber" was created on the first floor, to the west of the great hall, and it survives largely intact. In the 18th century, part of the ground floor was used for retail, and bow windows were added, which still survive. Otherwise, the façade generally survives as built, with an ashlar ground floor and a timber-framed, jettied upper floor. The doorway itself is a replacement, but the coats of arms above are from about 1670, and carvings of Saint Christopher and the Virgin and Child either side of the entrance also survive.

== Before restoration ==
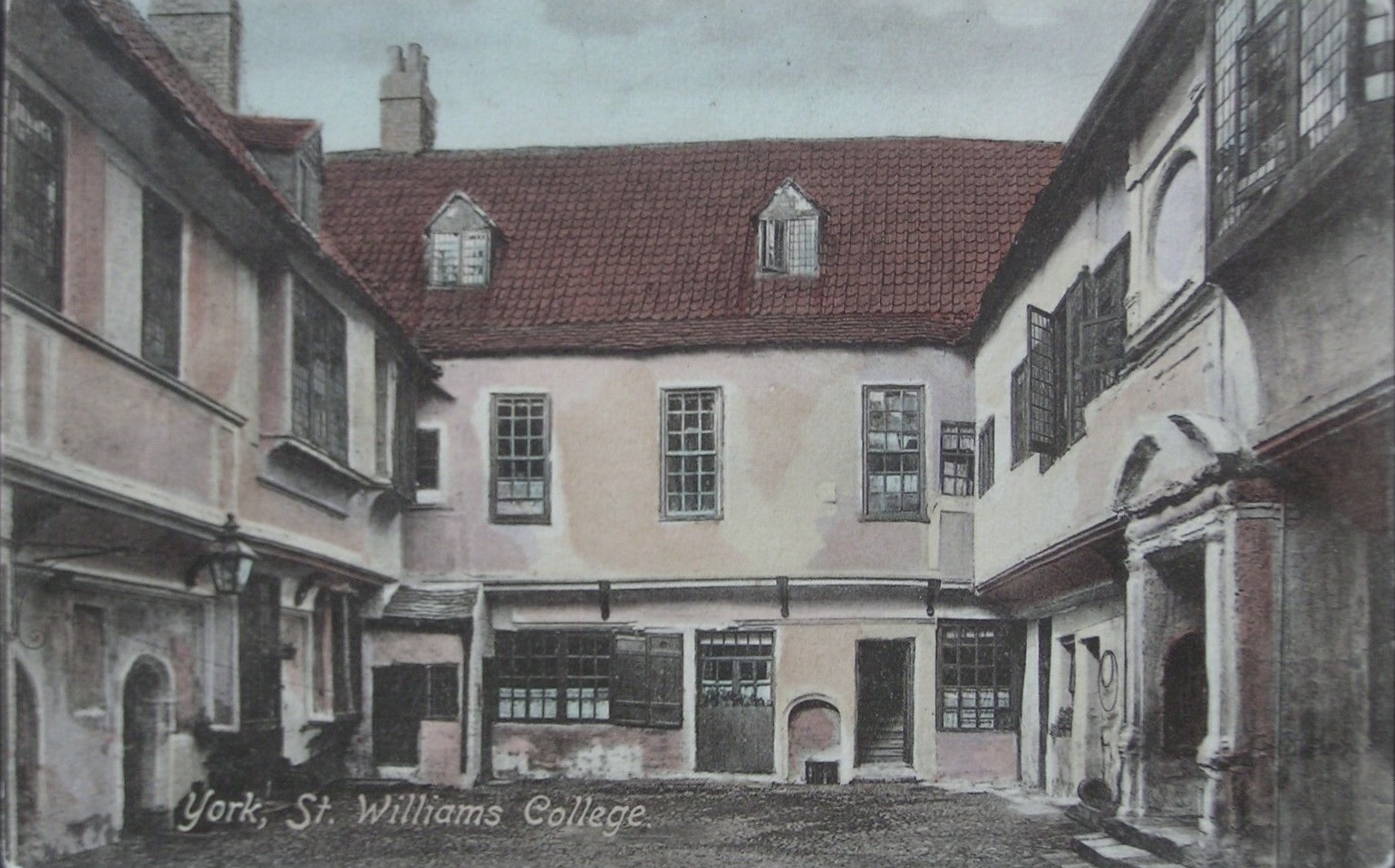
Francis Frith postcard "York, St William's College"

The building was bought by the Province of York in 1902 for use by its convocation, and Temple Moore then restored it. Among his alterations were the creation of the Maclagan Memorial Hall in the upper part of the great hall, where the original roof structure can be seen, although much renewed.

== See also ==
- Grade I listed buildings in the City of York
- Listed buildings in York (within the city walls, northern part)
