= Oratory =

Oratory is a type of public speaking.

Oratory may also refer to:

- Eloquence, fluent, forcible, elegant, or persuasive speaking
- Rhetoric, the art of discourse

== Places ==
- Oratory (worship), a public or private place of divine worship, akin to a chapel
- The Oratory, Liverpool, a former mortuary chapel in Liverpool, England
- Birmingham Oratory
- London Oratory
- Oxford Oratory
- York Oratory
- Petergate House
- More House
- Saint Joseph's Oratory, Montreal, Canada

== Religious orders ==
- Oratory of the Good Shepherd (Anglican)
- Oratory of Jesus, or "French Oratory" (Roman Catholic)
- Oratory of Saint Philip Neri (Roman Catholic)
- Teologisk Oratorium (Lutheran)

== See also ==
- Orator (disambiguation)
- Oratorian (disambiguation)
- Oratorio, a type of musical composition
- Oratory School (disambiguation)
