= Eagle & Child, York =

Listed pub in York, England

Eagle & Child
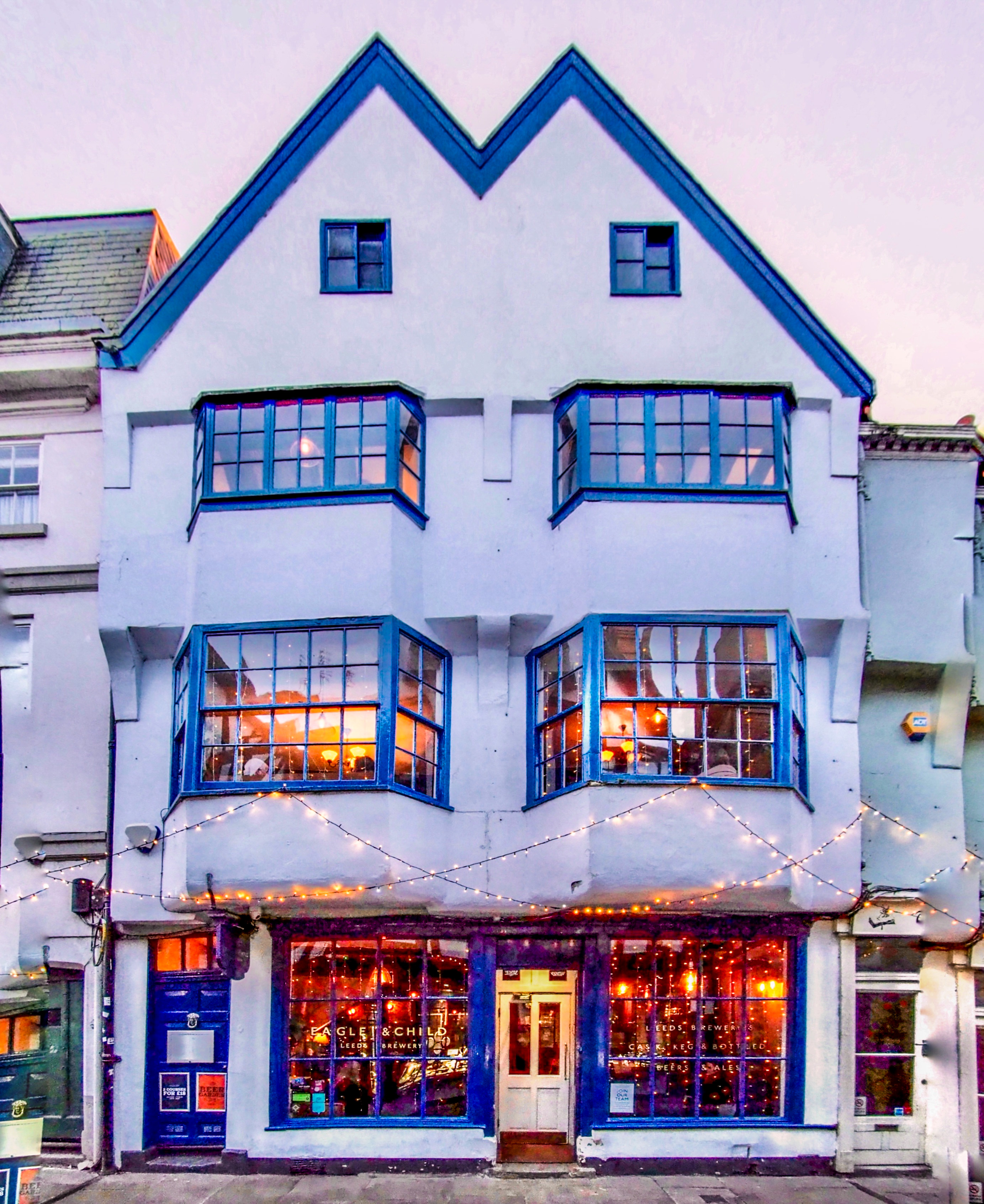
- The pub in 2023

General information
- Location: 9 High Petergate, York, England
- Coordinates: 53°57′45″N 1°05′05″W
- Completed: Early 17th century
- Renovated: Early 18th century (altered and outbuilding added); Mid-19th century (shopfront, altered); 20th century (altered and extended)

Technical details
- Floor count: 3 + attic

Design and construction
- Designations

Listed Building – Grade II*
- Official name: Cottage at rear of Number 11 Number 9 and attached outbuildings
- Designated: 14 June 1954
- Reference no.: 1257621

Website
- eagleandchildyork.co.uk

The Eagle & Child is a pub on High Petergate, in the city centre of York, in England.

The building was constructed in the early 17th century, as a three-storey timber-framed building, with attics and a jettied front. In the 18th century, the building was altered internally, and a brick extension was added at the rear, shared with the neighbouring Petergate House. The building's staircase survives from this period. Late that century, bays were added at the front, which survive at the first and second-floor levels. There is a large chimney between the front and rear rooms of the original part of the building, with fireplaces surviving from the 17th, 18th and early 19th centuries. The building was further altered in the 20th century, and the ground floor shopfront dates from this era.

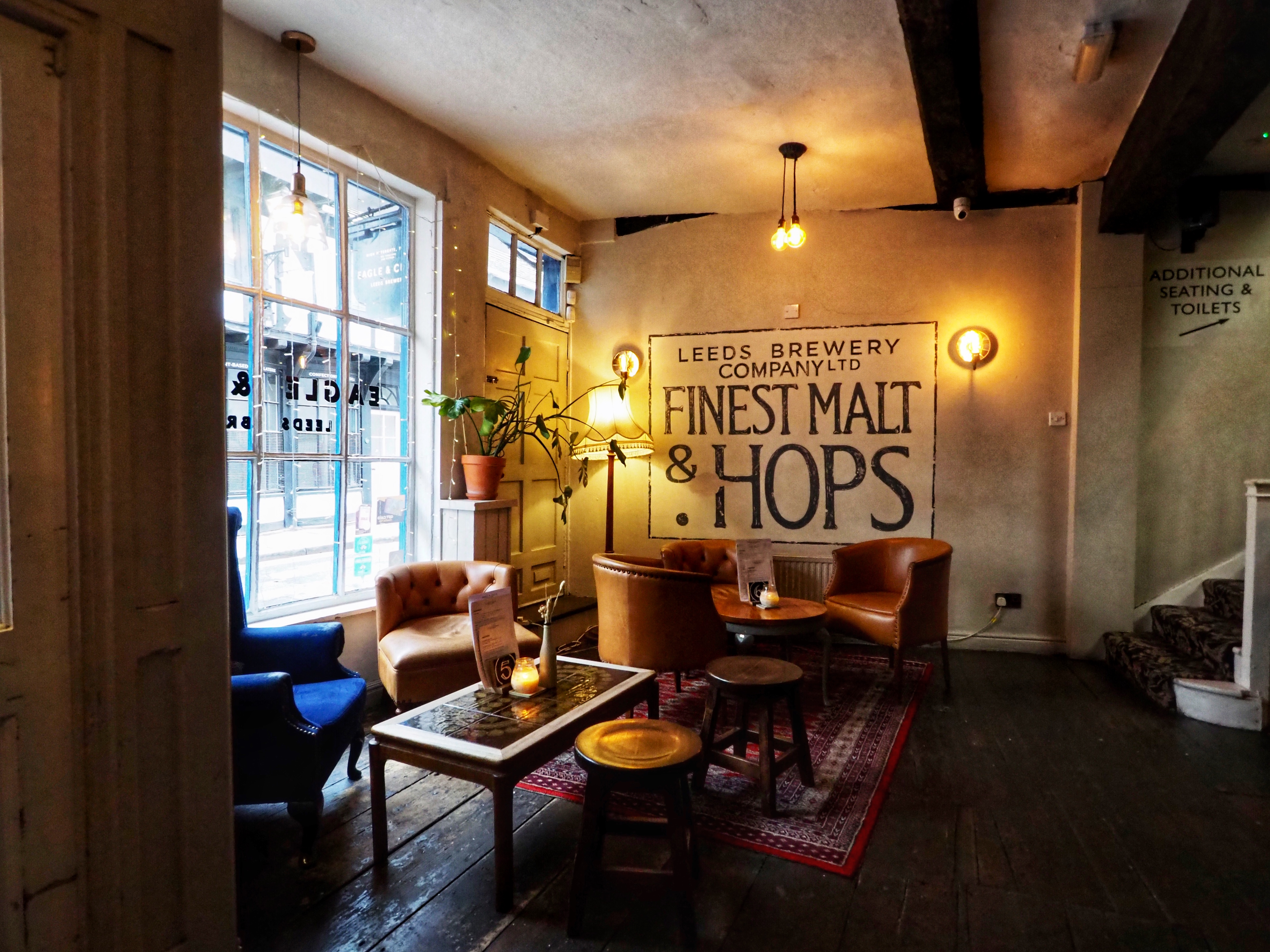
The front lounge

The building has been Grade II* listed since 1954. By the mid-1960s, the building was a restaurant, when the Rolling Stones signed their names in lipstick on the wall of the top floor, graffiti which has been preserved. In 1977, the restaurant became Plunketts, which operated until 2015. That year, the Leeds Brewery converted it into the Eagle & Child pub, the name taken from a pub which operated on The Shambles from the 1700s until 1925. In 2017, it was taken over by Camerons Brewery, who refurbished the pub.

== See also ==
- Grade II* listed buildings in the City of York
- Listed buildings in York (within the city walls, northern part)
