= 55 Low Petergate =

Listed building in York, England

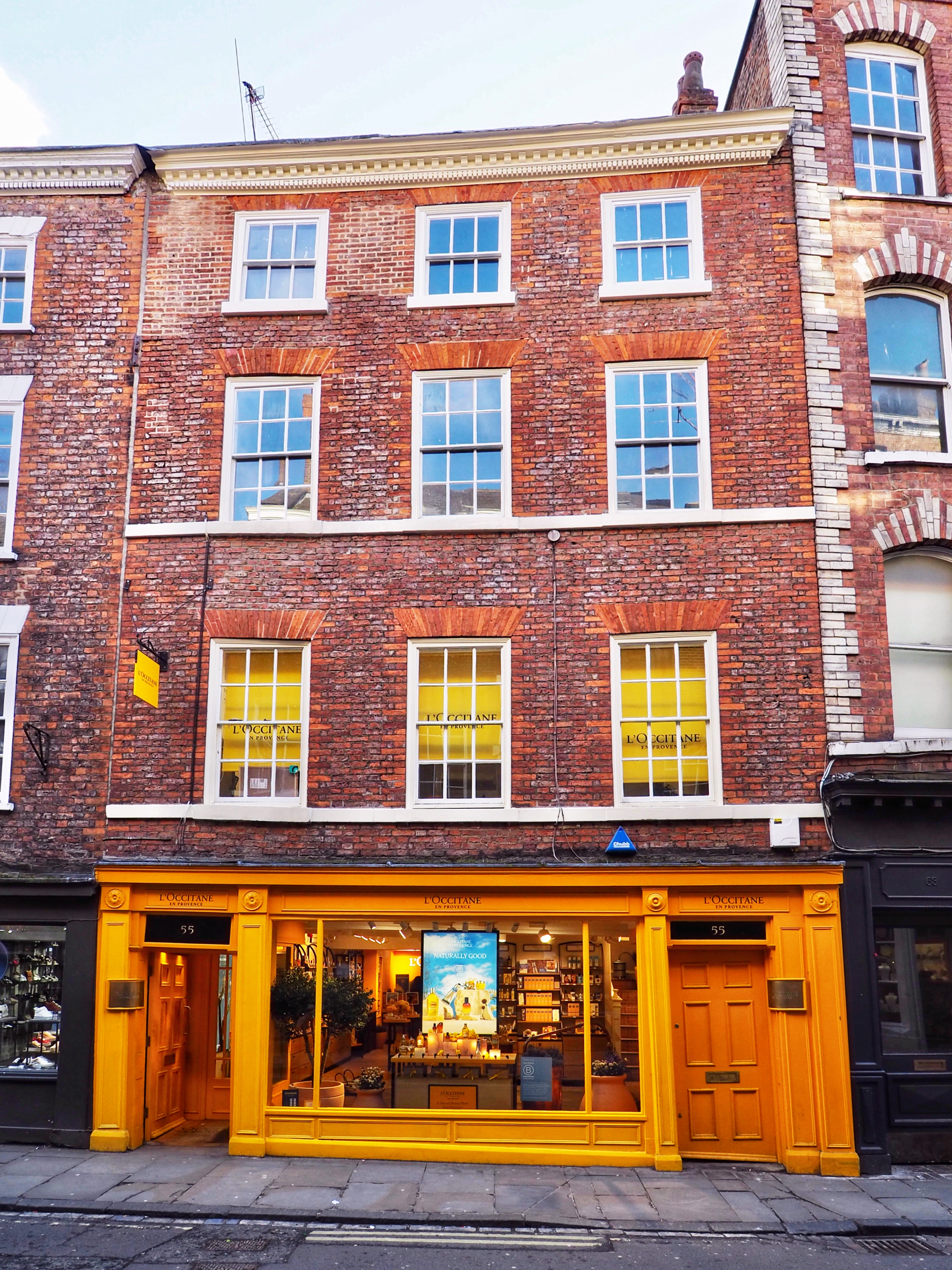
- The building in 2024
- Interactive map of the 55 Low Petergate area
- Former names: 38 Low Petergate

General information
- Location: Low Petergate, York, England
- Coordinates: 53.9607°N 1.0814°W
- Year built: Early 17th century
- Renovated: Mid-18th century (refronted); 19th century (altered) c. 1990 (renovated)

Listed Building – Grade II*
- Official name: 55, Low Petergate
- Designated: 14 June 1954
- Reference no.: 1257435

55 Low Petergate is a Grade II* listed building on Low Petergate in the city of York, England. Built as a house in the early 17th century, it was refaced in the mid‑18th century, adapted for shop use in the 19th century, and renovated around 1990. Formerly known as 38 Low Petergate, it became part of the Central Historic Core conservation area in 1968. It is now occupied by a branch of L'Occitane en Provence.

== History ==
Originally built as a house, it was later converted into a shop. It dates from the early 17th century, with the front rebuilt in the mid‑18th century. The shopfront was altered in the 19th century, and the building was renovated around 1990. It was formerly known as 38 Low Petergate.

On 14 June 1954, No. 55 was designated a Grade II* listed building, and in 1968 the site was included within the newly established Central Historic Core conservation area. It stands between Jackson House at No. 53, and No. 57, which are both listed at Grade II. No. 55 is now occupied by a branch of the French retailer L'Occitane en Provence.

== Architecture ==
The building is timber‑framed and later refaced in orange‑grey brick, with the rear rendered. It has a moulded timber cornice with dentils and modillions, and a pantile roof with a rendered brick chimney. The front is four storeys and three bays. The shopfront has sunk‑panel pilasters with decorative roundels at the top, a panelled fascia and cornice, and a plate‑glass window above a sunk‑panel riser, flanked by two six‑panel doors. The first and second‑floor windows are 12‑pane sashes with painted stone sill bands. The third‑floor windows are squat six‑pane sashes with painted stone sills; the outer ones are blind, flanking the original attic window in the gable. All the windows have flat arches of orange brick.

At the rear, a gabled wing behind the front block has an external stack supporting four diagonally set chimney flues. Most windows are 20th‑century replacements, except for one two‑by‑six Yorkshire sash in the attic. The front block has a cogged brick eaves course.

=== Interior ===
Inside, the ground‑floor front room has large panelled beams exposed. The staircase rises through the full height of the house and is built with a close string, heavy bulbous balusters, a moulded handrail, and panelled newels finished with shaped finials. On the first floor, the front room is divided by a light studded partition wall and has a cornice with dentils and modillions. An original 19th‑century lettered shop window is preserved on display on the first‑floor landing.

== See also ==
- Grade II* listed buildings in the City of York
- Listed buildings in York (within the city walls, northern part)
