= 73–77 Low Petergate =

Listed terrace in York, England

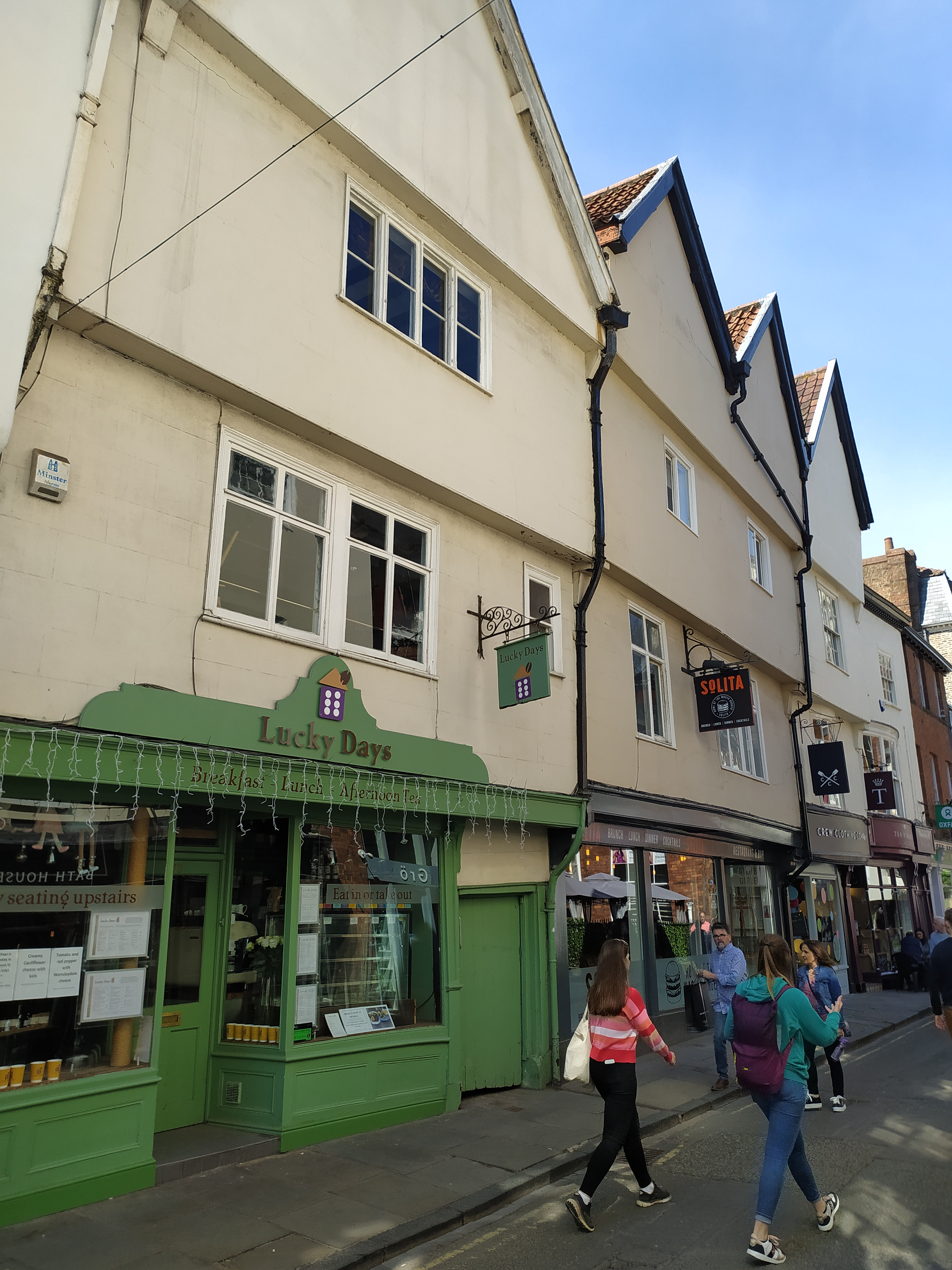
- The terrace in 2021
- Interactive map of the 73–77 Low Petergate area

General information
- Location: Low Petergate, York, England
- Coordinates: 53°57′39″N 1°04′53″W
- Completed: Late 16th century
- Renovated: 19th century (converted to shops); 20th century (altered)

Technical details
- Floor count: 3

Design and construction
- Designations

Listed Building – Grade II*
- Official name: 73, 75 and 77, Low Petergate
- Designated: 14 June 1954
- Reference no.: 1257419

73–77 Low Petergate is a terrace of late 16th-century buildings in York, England. The houses lie on Low Petergate, one of the most important streets in the city centre, now a major shopping street.

The terrace originally consisted of four houses. Each is of three storeys with an attic, and each storey is jettied over the one below. They are timber-framed throughout, and this is largely exposed inside the upper floors. In each building, part of the original staircase from the second floor to the attic survives. In No. 75, a large chimney breast with two hearths survives.

The street fronts are rendered with stucco, with incisions designed to make it resemble ashlar. Nos. 73 and 77 have original gables, while No. 75 has twin gables which were added in the 17th century. Various extensions have been added to the rear of the terrace, with the largest addition being to No. 73.

In the 19th century, the ground floors were converted into three shops, and the shop front of No. 77 survives, while the others were further altered in the 20th century. With the later house at No. 71, and the earlier ones at No. 79 and No. 81, they form a lengthy range of timber-framed buildings which Nikolaus Pevsner described as "impressive". The terrace has been Grade II* listed since 1954.

== See also ==
- Grade II* listed buildings in the City of York
- Listed buildings in York (within the city walls, northern part)
