= 25–29 High Petergate =

Listed buildings in York, England

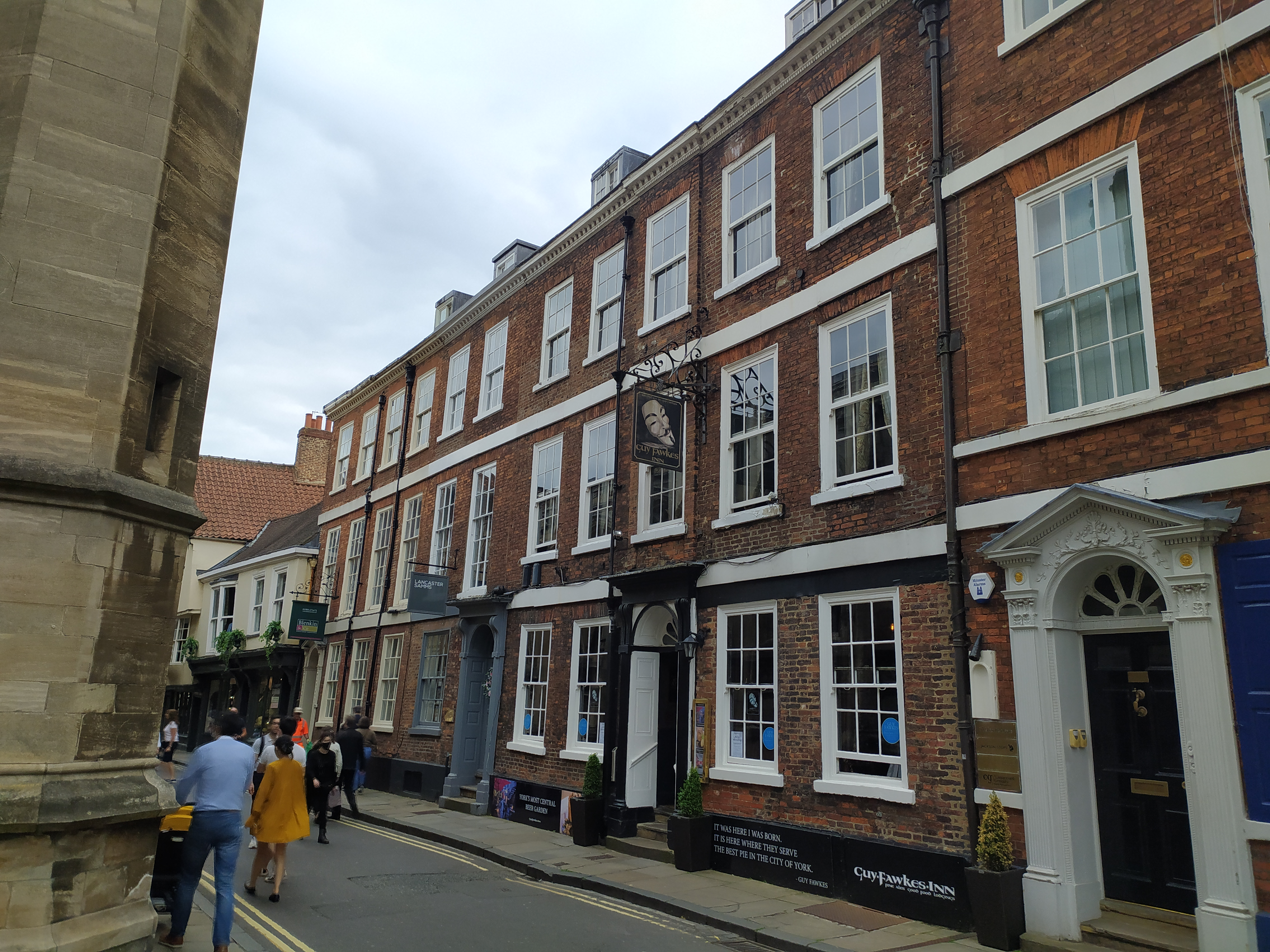
- The terrace in 2021
- Interactive map of the 25–29 High Petergate area

General information
- Location: High Petergate, York, England
- Coordinates: 53°57′42″N 1°04′59″W
- Completed: 1700–1707
- Renovated: Late 19th and 20th centuries (alterations and extensions)

Technical details
- Floor count: 3 + cellar + attic

Design and construction
- Designations

Listed Building – Grade II*
- Official name: Youngs Hotel (Number 25)
- Designated: 14 June 1954
- Reference no.: 1257610

25–29 High Petergate is a Grade II* listed terrace in the city centre of York, England.

The terrace lies on High Petergate, one of the main streets in York. Nos. 27 and 29 were designed by John and George Bowes and completed by 1701, while No. 25 was added in 1707. All three are three storeys tall, with an attic, and built of orange brick, on a stone plinth. Each is of a different width: No. 25 is five bays wide, No. 27 two bays, and No. 29 four bays. The centre bay of No. 25 is slightly forward of the rest of the facade.

Internally, the original staircase of No. 29 remains, while No. 25 has an early 19th-century staircase, and No. 27 was entirely refitted in the 19th century. No. 27 also has some stained glass, designed by Thomas Hodgson in 1801. The front doors all date from around 1800. At the back, all three have gables: curved on No. 25, and Dutch on Nos. 27 and 29.

The three buildings are in commercial use. No. 25 is the Guy Fawkes Hotel, which has a plaque installed by the York Dungeon claiming that Guy Fawkes was born on the site. However, there is no evidence of this, and the York Civic Trust instead argues that he was born on nearby Stonegate.

== See also ==
- Grade II* listed buildings in the City of York
- Listed buildings in York (within the city walls, northern part)
