= 2–2A High Petergate =

Listed building in York, England

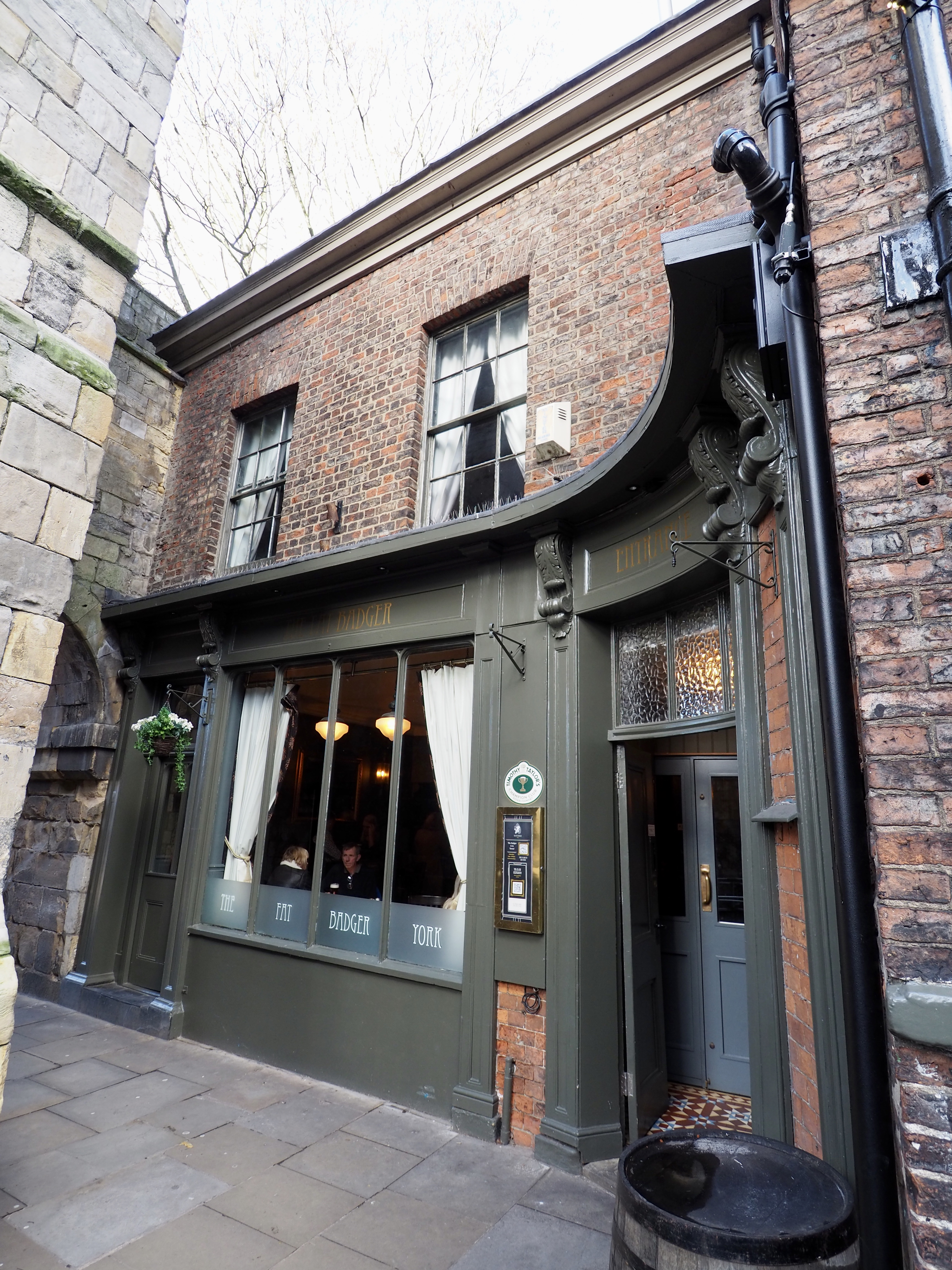
- The building in 2023, with part of Bootham Bar in view (left)
- Interactive map of the 2–2A High Petergate area

General information
- Location: High Petergate, York, England
- Coordinates: 53.96278476°N 1.084838322°W
- Completed: c. 1840

Listed Building – Grade II
- Official name: 2 and 2A, High Petergate
- Designated: 1 July 1968
- Reference no.: 1257613

2–2A High Petergate is a historic building in York, England. A Grade II listed structure, it stands next to Bootham Bar and is partly built into it, at the opposite end of High Petergate from York Minster. It dates from around 1840, with a shopfront added in the following century.

As of 2023 the building, and the neighbouring No. 4, formerly the Bootham Bar Hotel, is occupied by the twelve-bedroom inn The Fat Badger, which opened in May 2022. The inn's bar occupies the ground floor of Nos. 2 and 2A, with guest rooms on the first floor. The Fat Badger replaced the previous inn, the Lamb & Lion.

== Architecture ==
The building is constructed of orange‑grey brick on the front and a different brick pattern at the rear, with a timber shopfront and cornice, and a slate roof with brick chimneys. It has two storeys with a two‑window front. The shopfront is set between panelled uprights beneath a wide panelled fascia and a shaped cornice on decorative brackets. A four‑light window stands above a raised panelled base, with two curved panelled doors to the right that have a blocked overlight and meet the neighbouring property at No. 4. To the left is a four‑panel door with an overlight. The upper windows are 12‑pane sashes with slender glazing bars and gently arched brick heads, and a moulded cornice runs along the eaves. The interior has not been inspected.

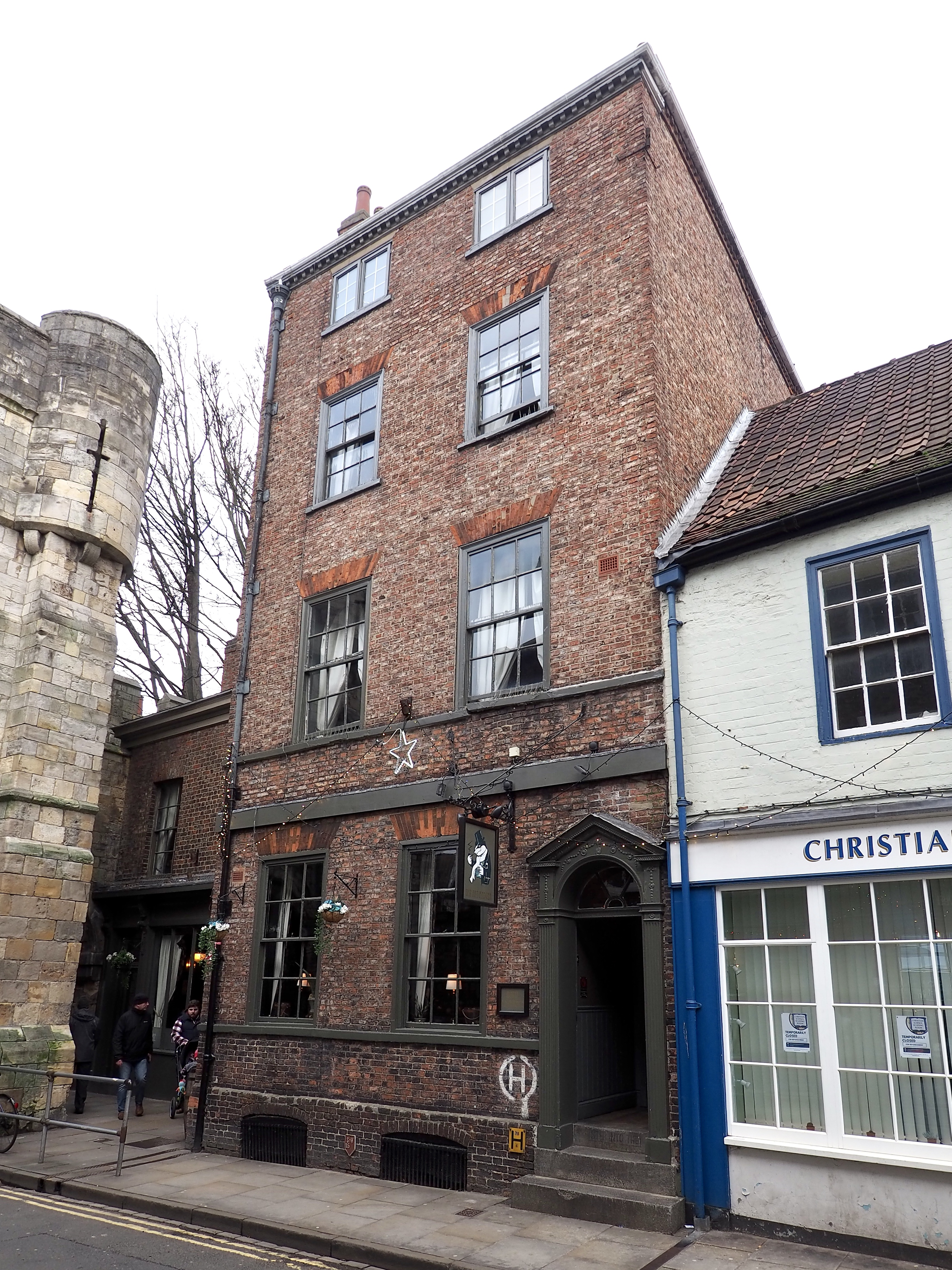
The former Bootham Bar Hotel at No. 4

== See also ==
- Listed buildings in York (within the city walls, northern part)
