= 79 Low Petergate =

Listed building in York, England

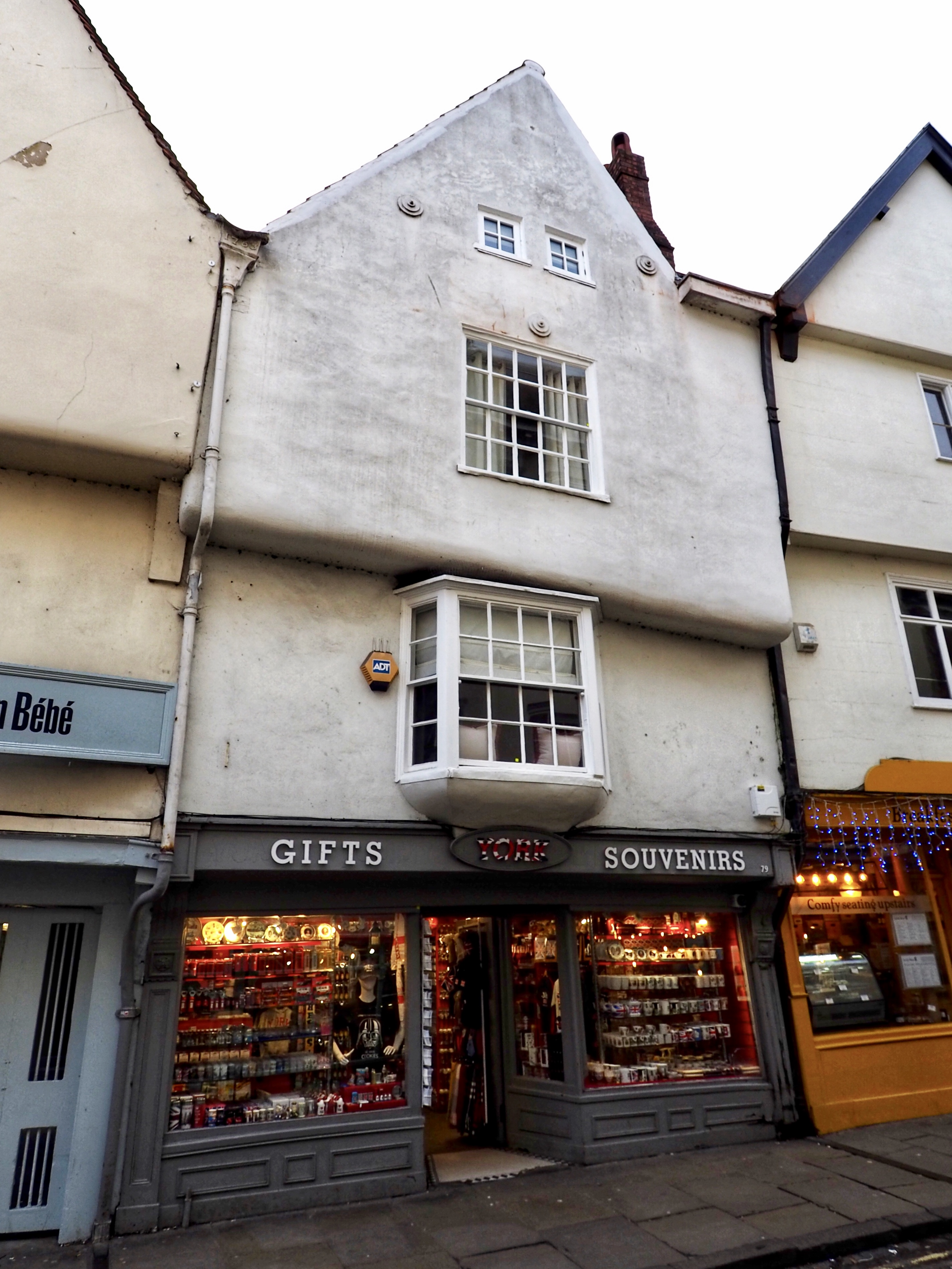
- The building in 2024
- Interactive map of the 79 Low Petergate area
- Former names: 49 Low Petergate

General information
- Type: Shop (originally a house)
- Location: Low Petergate, York, England
- Coordinates: 53.9607°N 1.0814°W
- Year built: Early 15th century
- Renovated: 16th century (extended); 19th century (altered)

Listed Building – Grade II*
- Official name: 79, Low Petergate
- Designated: 14 June 1954
- Reference no.: 1257424

79 Low Petergate is a Grade II* listed building on Low Petergate in the city of York, England. Dating from the early 15th century, it was originally built as a house and has been altered extensively over time, including the addition of a later front and an extension into a 16th‑century rear range shared with Nos. 73–77. The building is now occupied by a gift and souvenir shop.

== History ==
Originally built as a house in the early 15th century, the building has since undergone major alterations and was given a new front at a later date. It was extended into a 16th‑century rear range shared with Nos. 73–77, and the shopfront was altered in the 19th century. It was formerly known as 49 Low Petergate.

On 14 June 1954, No. 79 was designated a Grade II* listed building, and in 1968 the site was included within the newly established Central Historic Core conservation area. It stands next to No. 81, which is also listed at Grade II*. No. 79 is now occupied by a gift and souvenir shop.

== Architecture ==
The front section of the building is two bays deep and linked by a short passage to a one‑bay extension. Both parts are timber‑framed; the main block has stucco on its front and rear walls, while the extension is finished in rendered brick. The roof is covered with pantiles and has a brick chimney, and the ground floor contains a timber shopfront.

The building has three storeys and an attic, with a single gabled front and jettied upper floors. The shopfront is set between decorative pilasters and has angled plate‑glass windows flanking a glazed, panelled door. The first floor has a canted oriel window with a 16‑pane sash, the second floor a 20‑pane sash, and the attic two fixed four‑pane lights. A rainwater head shaped as a winged cherub and dated 1763 is fixed to the left side.

At the rear, the main block has a gabled end with its timber truss visible. The extension behind it is also gabled and has two storeys and an attic, with a modern door and a four‑pane sash at ground level, a 16‑pane sash above, and a nine‑pane fixed light in the attic.

=== Interior ===
The building shows exposed structural timber in various places across all floors. On the ground floor, the shop contains a hearth with a timber beam above it, and the rear room has a fireplace with a timber lintel.

On the first floor, the landing has a staircase balustrade with thick turned balusters, a column‑shaped newel and a curved moulded handrail. The rear room contains a fireplace with a decorated basket grate set in a plain surround with a moulded shelf.

The second floor has a similar fireplace, fitted with a later round‑headed grate. In the attic, part of the crown‑post truss remains visible in the front wall, the next truss has been altered, and a large brick firehood survives.

== See also ==
- Grade II* listed buildings in the City of York
- Listed buildings in York (within the city walls, northern part)
