= Second Boer War Memorial, York =

Listed memorial in York, England

Second Boer War Memorial
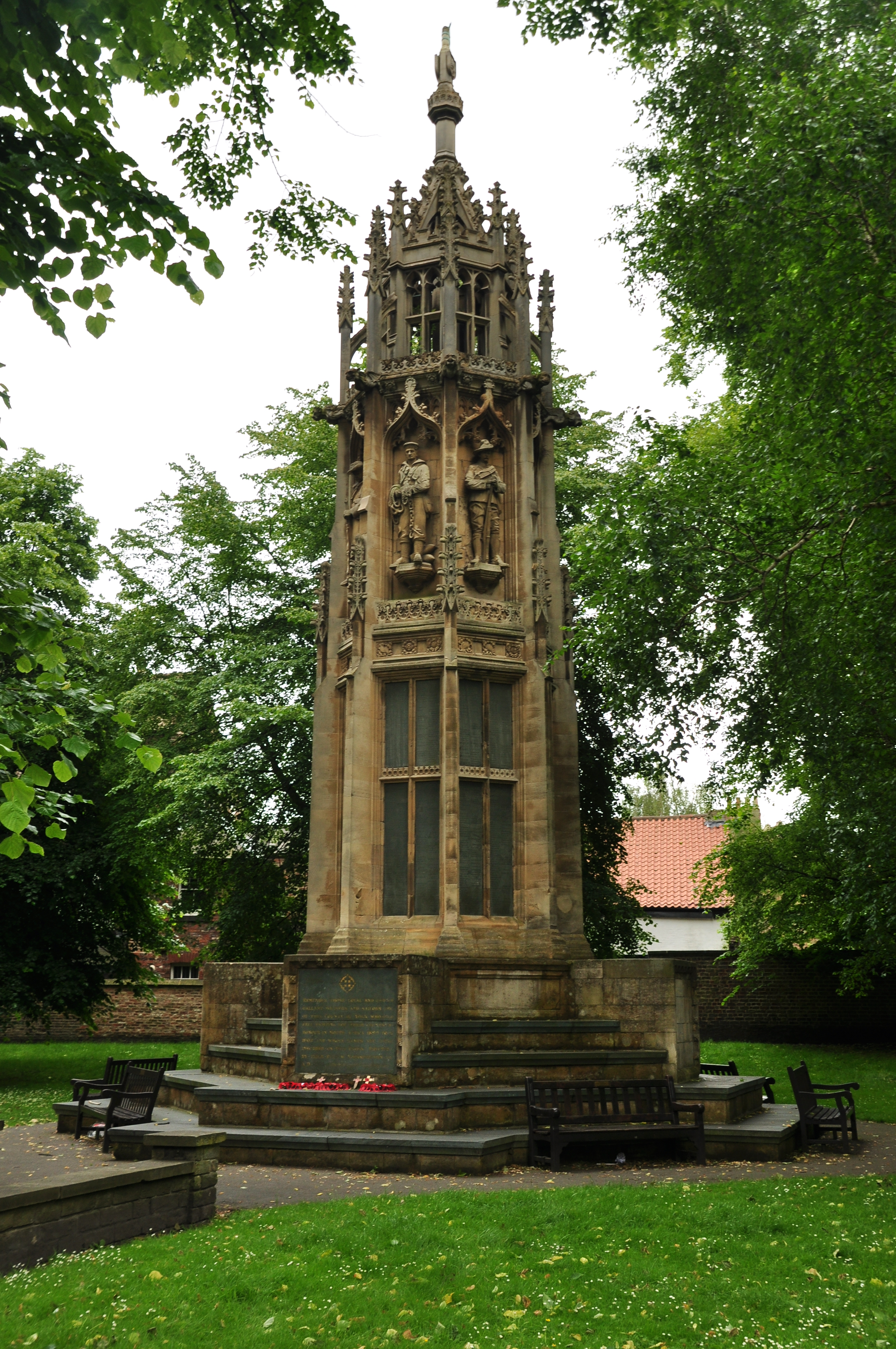
- The memorial in 2016
- Interactive map of the Second Boer War Memorial area

General information
- Architectural style: Perpendicular Gothic
- Location: Duncombe Place, York, England
- Coordinates: 53.9617°N 1.0837°W
- Completed: 1905

Design and construction
- Architect: G. F. Bodley
- Designations

Listed Building – Grade II*
- Official name: South African War Memorial
- Designated: 1 July 1968
- Reference no.: 1257874

The Second Boer War Memorial (officially listed as the South African War Memorial) lies in the city centre of York, England.

The war memorial lies on Duncombe Place, near York Minster. It commemorates the soldiers from Yorkshire who died in the Second Boer War, between 1899 and 1902. In total, there are 1,459 names on the memorial. It was designed by G. F. Bodley and constructed by Robert Bridgeman & Sons.

The memorial is in the Perpendicular Gothic style and is built of Ketton stone. It stands on an octagonal stepped base, and its upright is also octagonal, with buttresses and topped with finials. Its top is in a lantern form, and atop that is a cross and small shield. The front has eight niches, holding a statue representing different forces: a sailor, cavalryman, artilleryman, infantryman, imperial yeoman, militiaman, volunteer and nurse. The initial statue of a sailor showed him holding a Lee-Enfield Magazine Rifle Mark I, which was rejected as overly aggressive, and instead installed at the library in Lichfield.

The memorial was unveiled on 3 August 1905, in the presence of Frederick Roberts, 1st Earl Roberts. In 1961, the memorial was struck by lightning. In 1968, it was Grade II* listed.

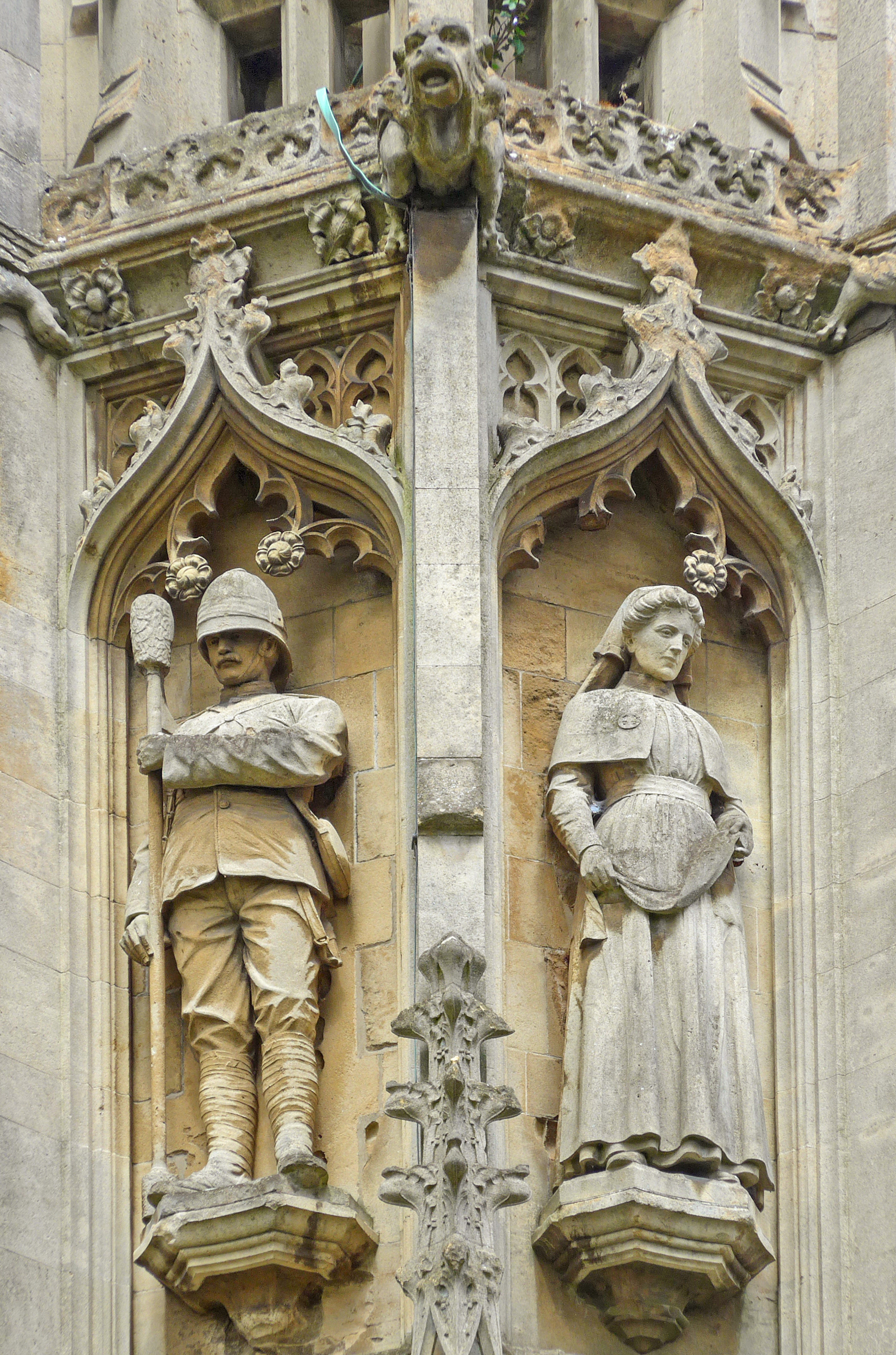
Two of the statues

== See also ==
- Grade II* listed buildings in the City of York
- Grade II* listed war memorials in England
- Listed buildings in York (within the city walls, northern part)
