= Oratorian =

An Oratorian is a member of one of the following religious orders:

- Oratory of Saint Philip Neri (Roman Catholic), who use the postnominal letters C.O.
- Oratory of Jesus (Roman Catholic)
- Oratory of the Good Shepherd (Anglican)
- Teologisk Oratorium (Lutheran)

== See also ==
- Oratory (disambiguation)
