= Masonic Hall, Duncombe Place =

Listed building in York, England

Masonic Hall
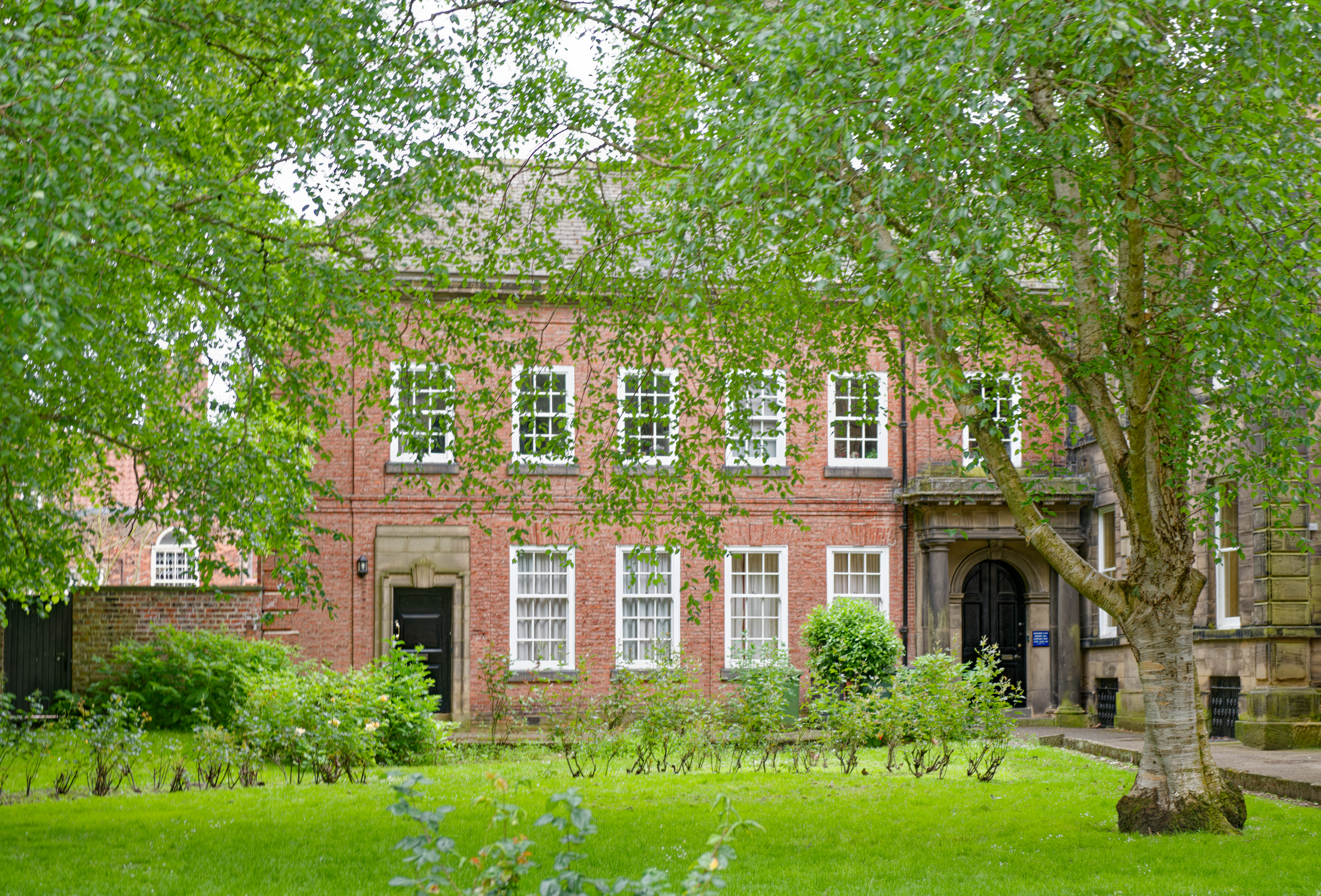
- The building in 2024

- Location within York City Centre

General information
- Type: Masonic Hall
- Location: Duncombe Place, York, England
- Coordinates: 53.96137°N 1.08394°W
- Year built: 1862–63
- Renovated: 1866 (altered); Early 20th century (extended)

Design and construction
- Architects: John Edwin Gates and J. Barton-Wilson

Listed Building – Grade II
- Official name: Masonic Hall
- Designated: 14 March 1997
- Reference no.: 1257873

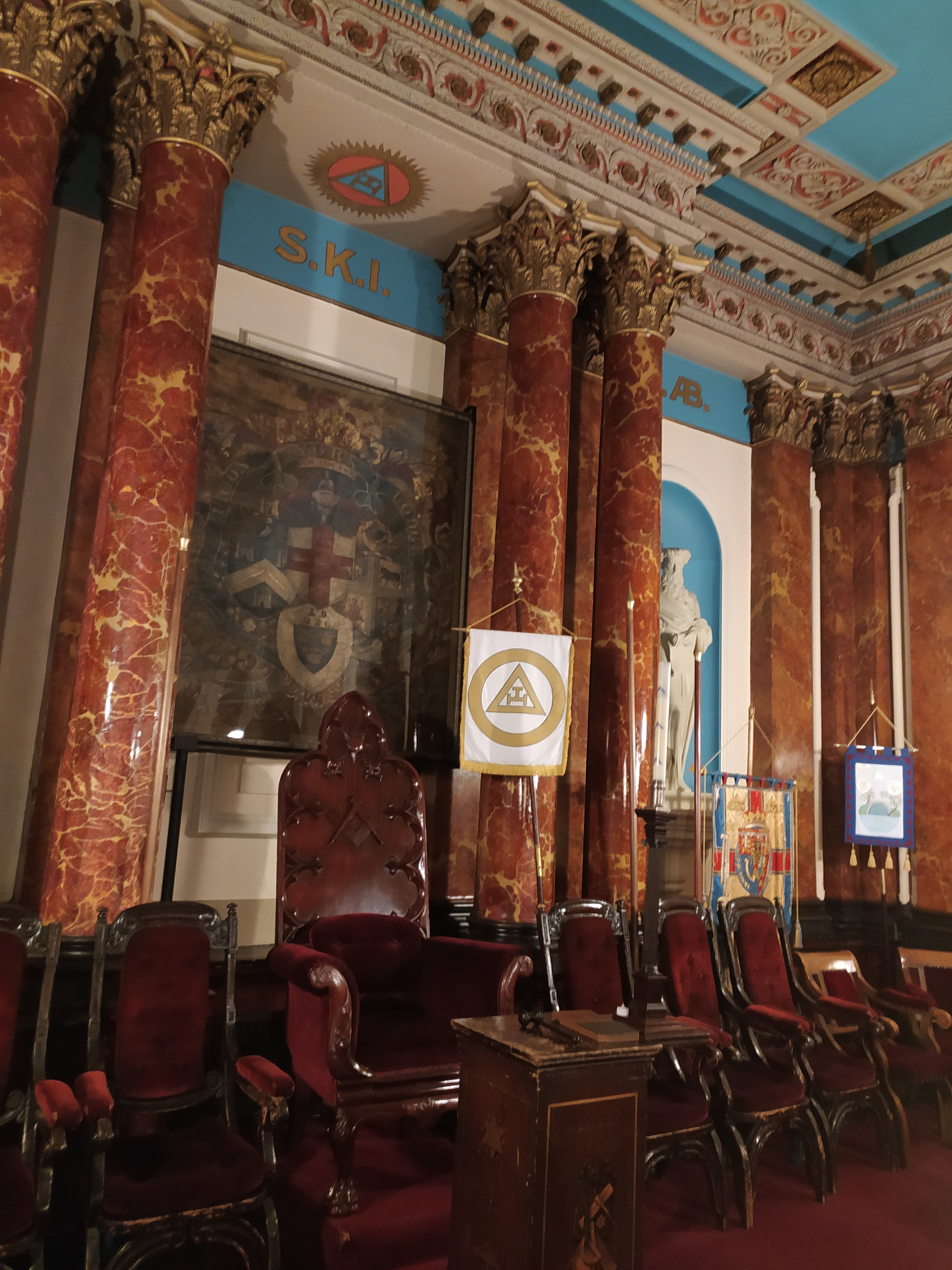
Interior of the hall

The Masonic Hall is a historic building on Duncombe Place in York, England. The building was designed by John Edwin Gates, a member of the York Lodge, and the Lodge Room interior was designed by J. Barton-Wilson, a fellow freemason from London. The foundation stone was laid in the north-east corner of the Lodge Room by the Worshipful Master, William Lawton, on 8 September 1862, with a jar of mementos placed beneath it. Construction finished in 1863, and the hall was consecrated on 2 June.

Alterations followed in 1866, when the front elevation was dismantled and rebuilt 12 feet (3.7 m) further forward. This allowed the Banqueting Room on the first floor to be enlarged, the original winding staircase to be replaced with the present square staircase, and the porch entrance to be moved to its current position. A large extension was added in the early 20th century to provide offices and accommodation for a caretaker.

The hall has two storeys with a basement below. The original building, including the masonic hall itself, is constructed of grey brick, while the extension is in red brick. The entrance is now through the extension. The front elevation includes moulding decorated with masonic symbols. The library contains 18th-century panelling and a fireplace of similar date.

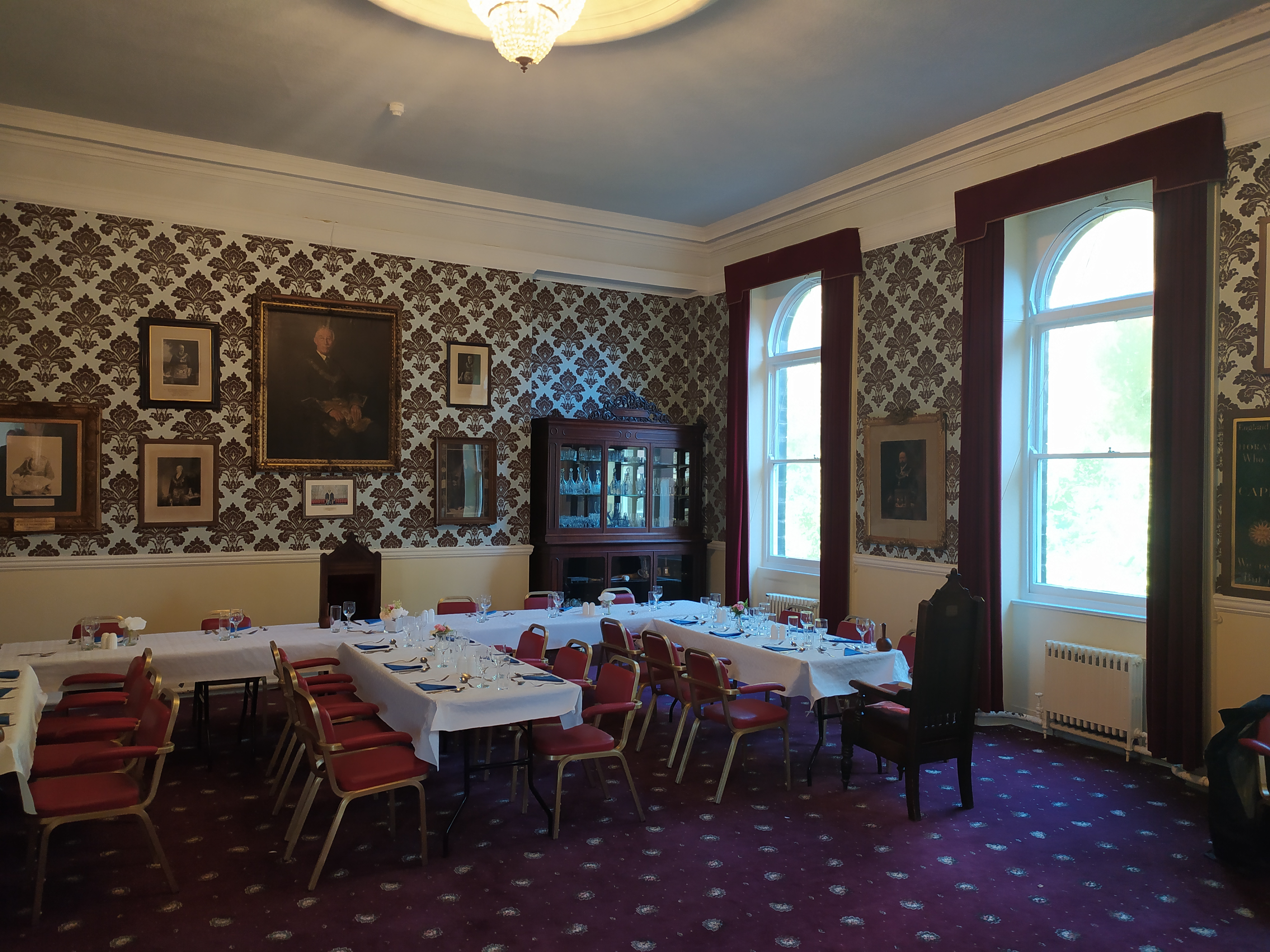
First floor dining room

The building was transferred to the Duncombe Place Masonic Hall Charitable Trust in 1993, with the aim of preserving "The Masonic Hall, Duncombe Place" for the benefit of the City of York and the nation. It is home to several masonic lodges, including Albert Victor Lodge 2328 and York Lodge 236, the oldest masonic lodge in York today, founded as the Union Lodge in 1777. From 1806, the lodge met at 7 Little Blake Street, but that building was demolished during the creation of Duncombe Place, prompting the construction of the present hall. It is the oldest purpose-built masonic hall in the city.

The building was Grade II listed in 1997.

== See also ==
- Listed buildings in York (within the city walls, northern part)
