= 41 and 43 Low Petergate =

Listed building in York, England

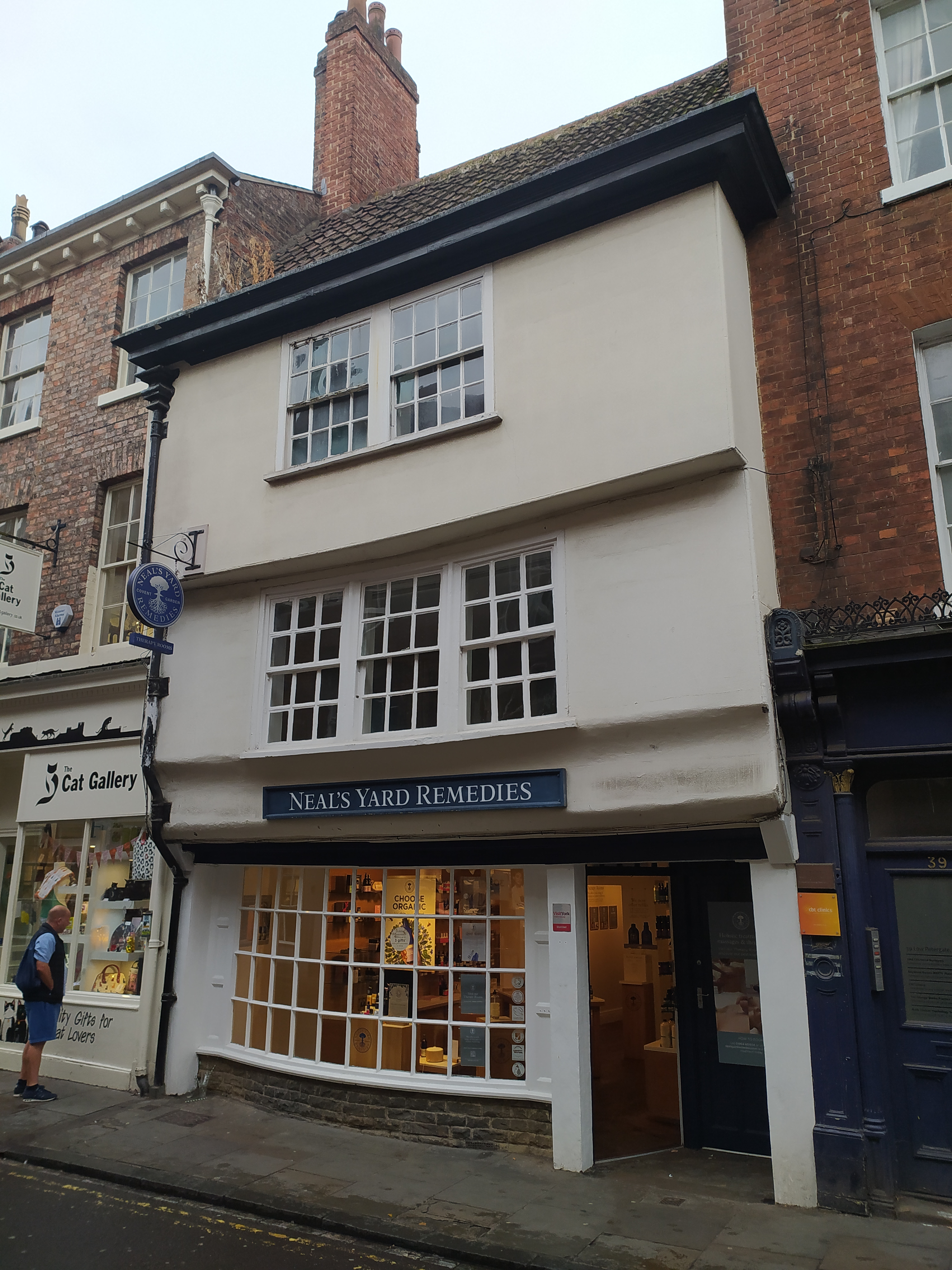
- The building in 2022

- Location within York Central

General information
- Location: Low Petergate, York, England
- Coordinates: 53°57′41″N 1°04′56″W
- Completed: Late 14th century
- Renovated: Early 18th century (altered and extended); 20th century (altered)

Technical details
- Floor count: 3

Design and construction
- Designations

Listed Building – Grade II*
- Official name: 41 and 43, Low Petergate
- Designated: 14 June 1954
- Reference no.: 1257454

41 and 43 Low Petergate is a historic building in the city centre of York, England.

The building lies on Low Petergate, one of the main streets in the city centre. The front section is a timber-framed building dating from the late 14th century. It was extended to the rear, in brick, in the 18th century. At the time, it was used as a coffee shop, and it remained the Garrick Coffee House until 1860. The building was Grade II* listed in 1954. Since 2011, it has housed a branch of Neal's Yard Remedies.

The front of the three-storey building is jettied, with the timberwork covered in plaster and whitewashed. At ground floor level is a timber shopfront, with a 20th-century bow window. The upper floors have sash windows dating from the 1760s. The cornice has an elaborate drainpipe head, decorated with rosettes. The rear is also of three storeys, the left bay having a round-headed staircase window, with a sash above. Inside, much timber framing is visible, as is the crown post roof in the front section. Early features include the cellar door, the 18th-century first floor staircase, and a ladder staircase to the attic, along with 17th and 18th-century panelling and doors in the front and back rooms on the first and second floors.

== See also ==
- Grade II* listed buildings in the City of York
- Listed buildings in York (within the city walls, northern part)
