= Orator (disambiguation) =

An orator is a person who speaks in public.

Orator may also refer to:

== People ==
- Attic orators
- Public Orator, a person acting as the voice of a university

=== Given name & nickname ===
- Orator Fuller Cook (1867–1949), American botanist and entomologist
- Orator Henry LaCraft (1850–1940), American politician
- Orator O'Rourke (1850–1919), American baseball player
- Orator Shafer (1851–1922), American baseball player

== Art, entertainment, and media ==
- Orator (comics), a character in the Marvel Universe
- The Orator, 2011 film
- Orator (Cicero), a text by Marcus Tullius Cicero written in 46 B.C.
- De Oratore ("On the Orator"), a dialogue by Cicero written in 55 B.C
- The Orator, a collection of short stories by Edgar Wallace
- The Orator, a Roman-Etruscan bronze sculpture from the late second century or early first century BCE

== See also ==
- Lecturer
- Oratory (disambiguation)
