= Duncombe Place =

Street in York, England

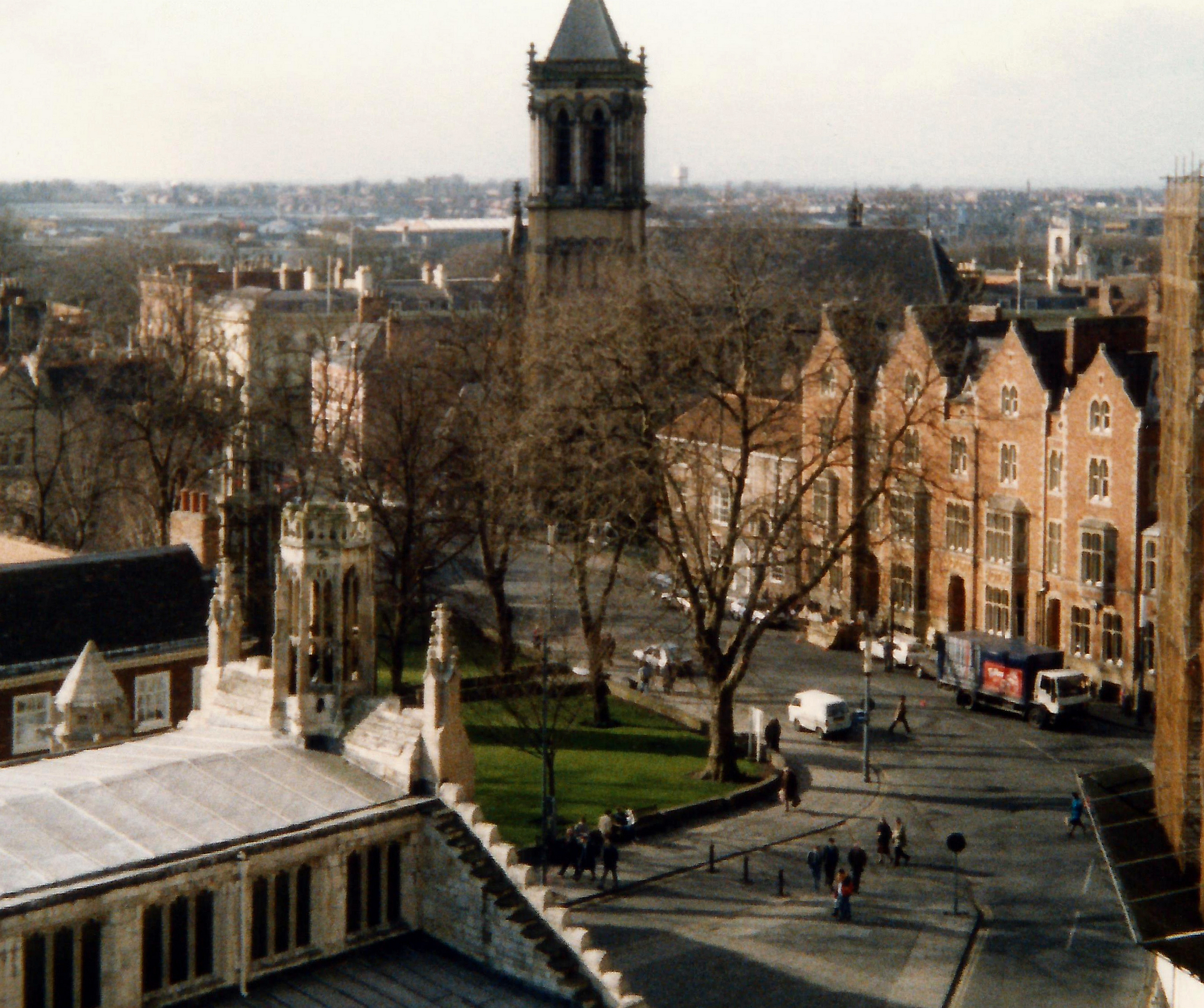
- Duncombe Place, seen from York Minster
- Location within York
- Former names: Lop Lane; Little Blake Street
- Location: York, England
- Coordinates: 53.9617°N 1.0844°W
- South west end: Blake Street; Museum Street; St Leonard's Place
- North east end: High Petergate; Minster Yard; Precentor's Court

Duncombe Place is a street in the city centre of York, in England.

== History ==
The street was first mentioned in 1346 as Lop Lane, and it later became known as Little Blake Street. Initially a very narrow street, the eastern entrance to St Leonard's Hospital lay on its north-western side. It was widened in 1785 to 15 feet, and then in 1864 to more than 100 feet. This led to the demolition of most of the existing buildings on what was then Minster Close, but some survive on the north-west side. Elsewhere, landmark late-Victorian buildings now line the road. In 1880, it was renamed "Duncombe Place", after Augustus Duncombe, the Dean of York.

The street has a long history of Catholic worship, with a house, probably 7 Little Blake Street, occupied by a priest as early as 1688, and by 1764, 170 Catholics were meeting in a chapel there, dedicated to St Wilfrid. In 1806, it was sold to the freemasons, but the York Oratory, the city's main Catholic church, was built on the street in 1864.

== Architecture ==
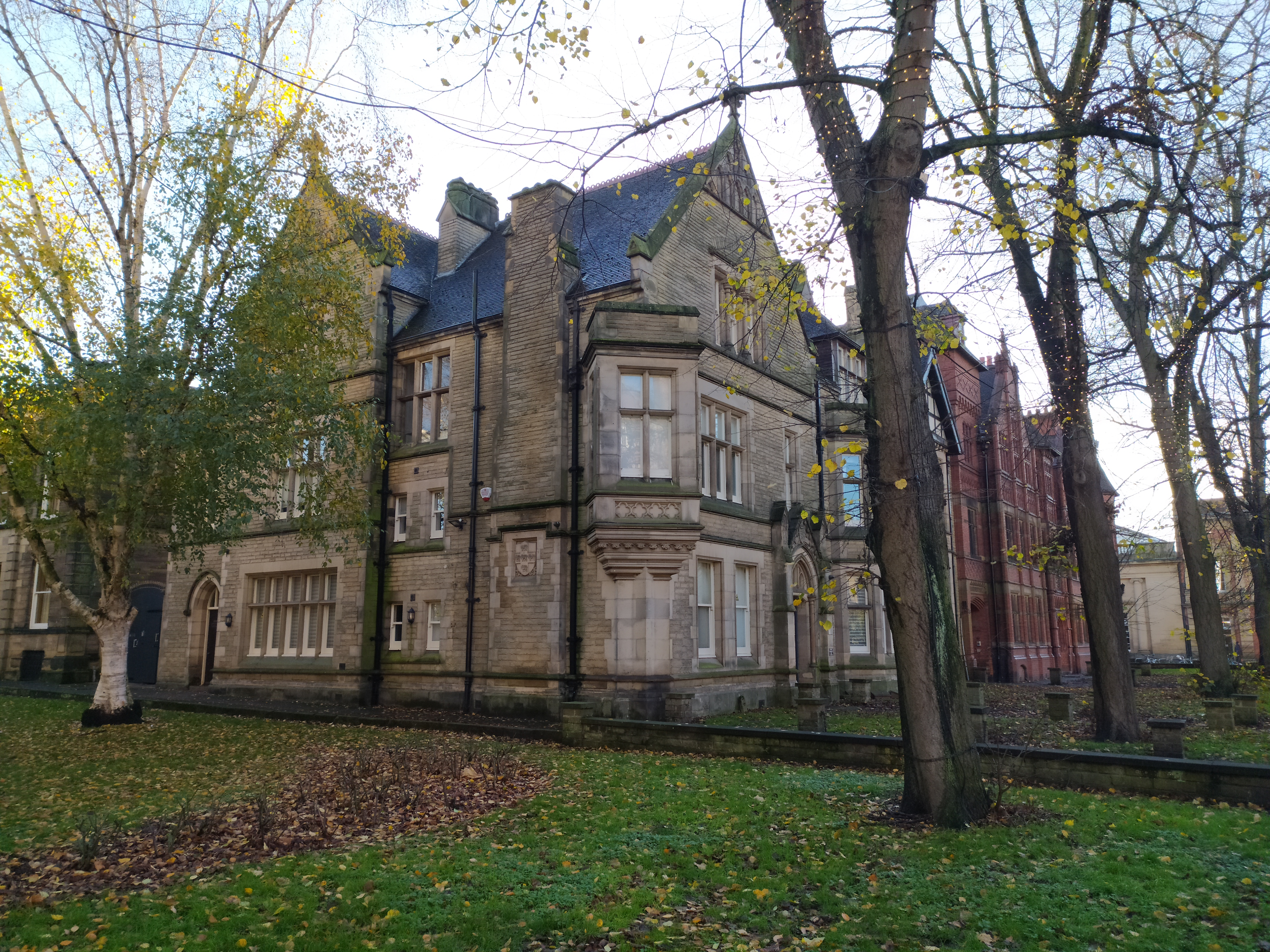
Buildings on the south east side of Duncombe Place

The street runs north-east from the junction of Blake Street, Museum Street and St Leonard's Place, to the front of York Minster, where Petergate, Minster Yard and Precentor's Court meet. It is the main approach to York Minster for visitors arriving from York railway station.

Almost all the buildings on the street are listed. The north-west side is dominated by the York Oratory, the city's main Catholic church, the other buildings being The Red House, built in 1714; the 18th-century Theatre House, with some 13th-century masonry in its basement; and the Dean Court Hotel. On the south side lie the former York Dispensary; the Crown Buildings, originally the city's probate offices; and a Victorian Masonic Hall. There is also a garden containing the city's Second Boer War Memorial. On the north-west side of the street is a listed K6 telephone kiosk.
