= The Adams House, York =

Listed building in York, England

The Adams House
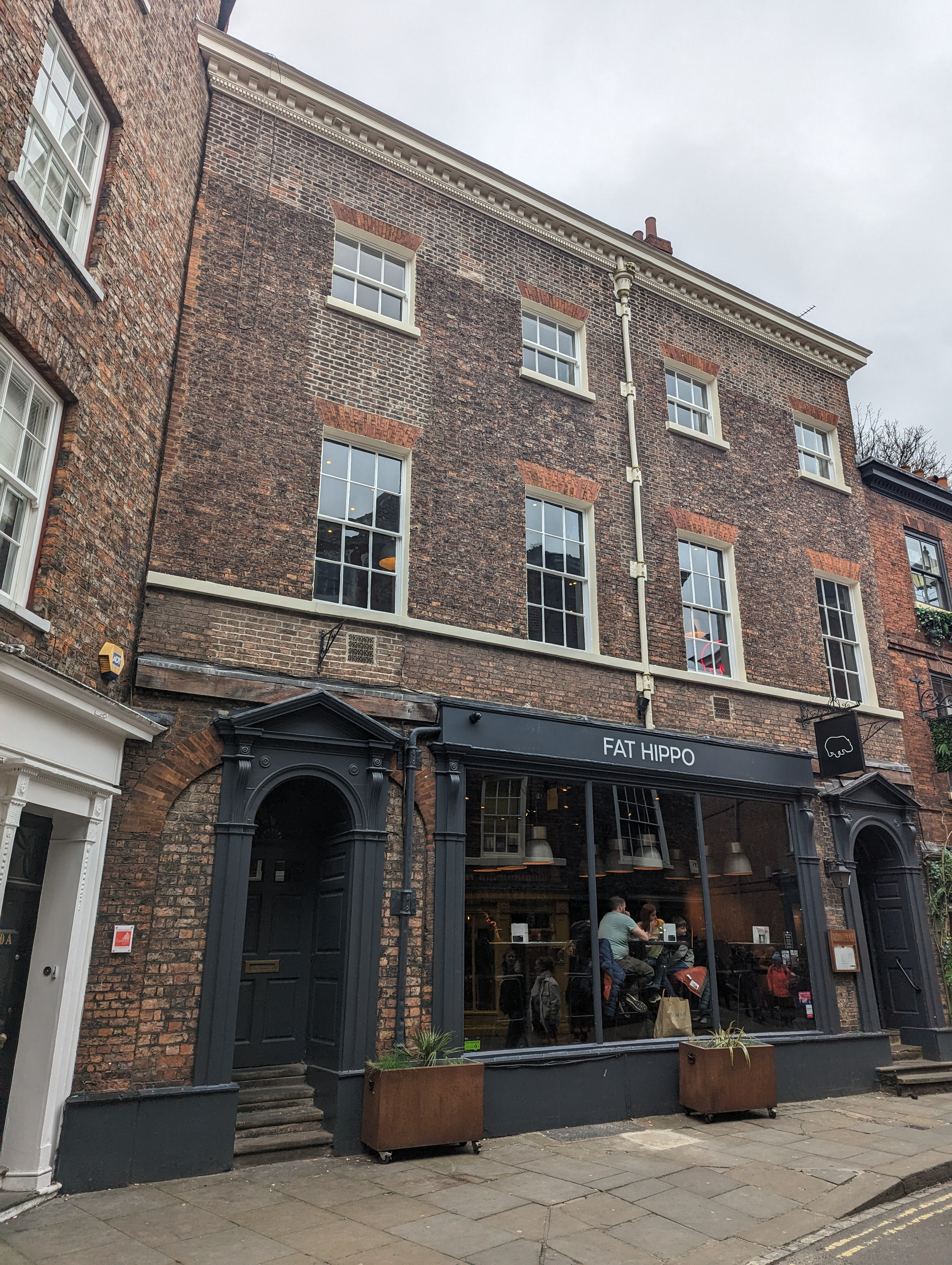
- The building in 2024
- Interactive map of the The Adams House area

General information
- Location: 52 Low Petergate, York, England
- Coordinates: 53°57′41″N 1°04′54″W
- Completed: 1772
- Client: John Fountayne

Technical details
- Floor count: 3

Design and construction
- Designations

Listed Building – Grade II*
- Official name: The Adams House
- Designated: 14 June 1954
- Reference no.: 1257433

The Adams House is a historic building in the city centre of York, England.

The house lies on Low Petergate, one of the main streets in the centre of York. It was built in 1772 for John Fountayne, the dean of York. It originally incorporated a ground floor passageway through which the deanery could be accessed. Construction cost £1,353 (equivalent to £178,757 in 2025), and the building was immediately let to one of the cathedral vergers, who then sub-let it. At a later date, the ground floor was converted into a shop, incorporating the former passageway.

The building was Grade II* listed in 1954. For some time, it was a branch of Café Rouge, before becoming Jimmy's cafe-bar, and in 2022, a Fat Hippo burger bar.

The three-storey building is built of brick on a stone base. The original entrance doorway survives, with a second entrance having been created when the passageway was removed; the remainder of the ground floor facade is a shopfront, in similar style. There is a decorated cornice, and an original drainpipe head, with the crest of an elephant, the emblem of Fountayne. The rear facade is plainer, with various sash windows, and some blocked windows.

Inside, the ground floor has been altered, but many rooms on the upper floors retain their original plasterwork and fireplaces, the grandest being in the first floor saloon. Two original staircases also survive.

== See also ==
- Grade II* listed buildings in the City of York
- Listed buildings in York (within the city walls, northern part)
