= York Dispensary =

Listed building in York, England

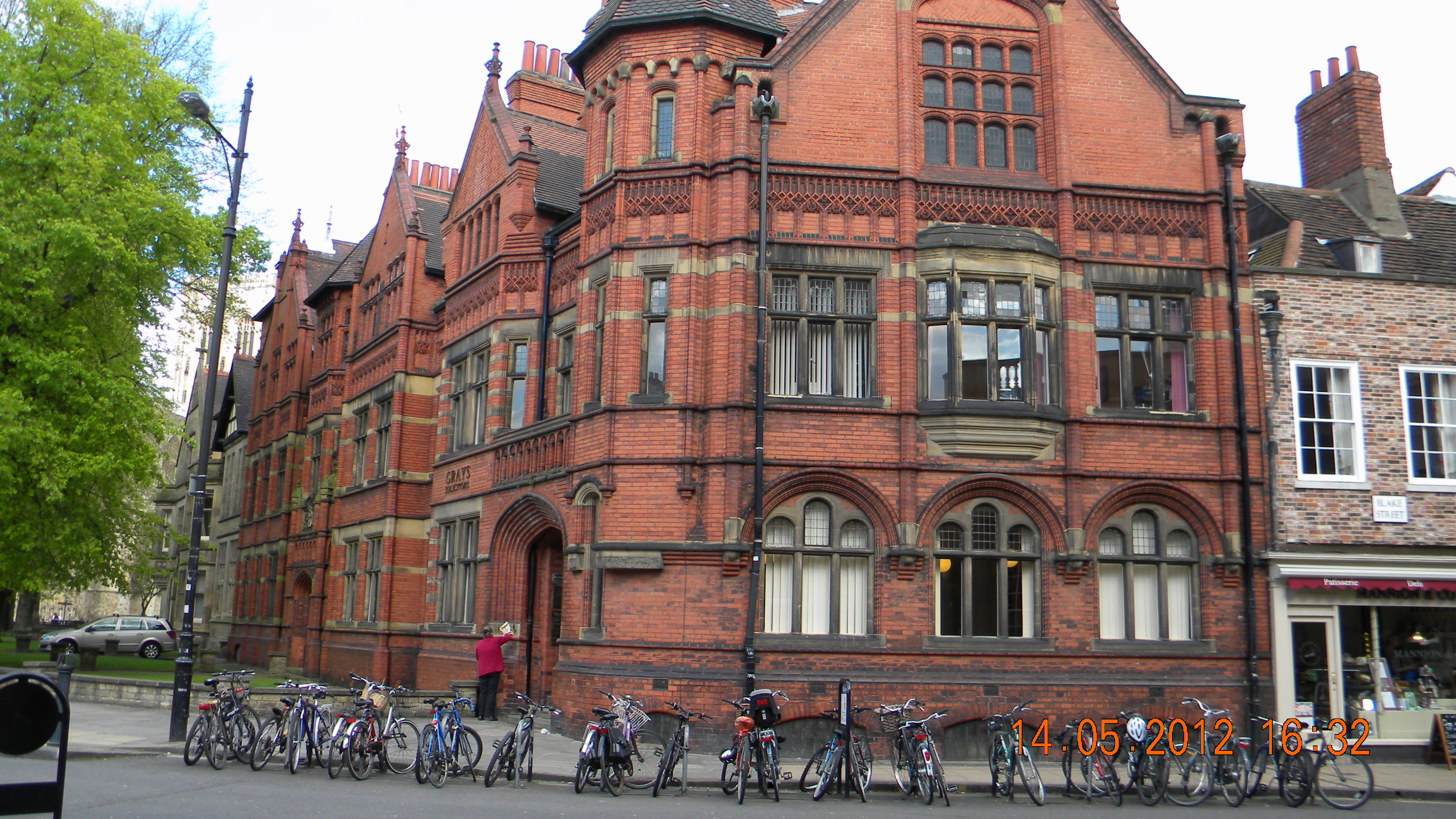
- The building, seen from Blake Street, in 2012

- Location within York City Centre

General information
- Status: Converted to offices
- Type: Medical dispensary and offices (former)
- Architectural style: Jacobethan Revival
- Location: 8 Duncombe Place, York, England
- Coordinates: 53.96129°N 1.08465°W
- Year built: 1897–1899
- Client: Messrs Gray, Dodsworth and Cobb

Design and construction
- Architect: Edmund Kirby

Listed Building – Grade II
- Official name: Number 8 and Grays Dispensary
- Designated: 13 October 1975
- Reference no.: 1257867

The York Dispensary is a historic building on Duncombe Place in the city centre of York, England.

The York Dispensary was established in 1788 in a room at Merchant Adventurers' Hall. It provided free treatment to poor patients, and its doctors undertook home visits when necessary. In 1808 it moved to a house on St Andrewgate, then in 1829 to a purpose-built building on New Street. In 1899 it required larger premises and relocated to a new building on Duncombe Place, designed by Edmund Kirby and constructed at a cost of £6,000. The dispensary closed in 1948 following the founding of the National Health Service, and the following year the building became a health service centre run by the city corporation. It was designated Grade II in 1975, and by 1991 had been converted to office use.

The solicitors' offices in 2024

Kirby was originally commissioned by the firm of solicitors Messrs Gray, Dodsworth and Cobb to design offices. When the neighbouring site was purchased by the dispensary, it also engaged Kirby and asked him to construct both buildings in the same style.

The building is constructed of red brick, with moulded brick dressings, stone window surrounds, tiled roofs, finials in terracotta and wrought iron, and a weathervane in the form of a snake. It has two main storeys, a basement and an attic, with various gables and turrets. The former dispensary has an arched entrance with its original double doors, and a carved stone panel above displaying the city's coat of arms and the text "YORK DISPENSARY". There is also an arched carriage entrance with wrought-iron gates, with "PATIENTS ENTRANCE" inscribed above. Inside, the original dispensary and office staircases survive, as do various doors, architraves and cornices.

== See also ==
- Listed buildings in York (within the city walls, northern part)
