= 81 Low Petergate =

Listed building in York, England

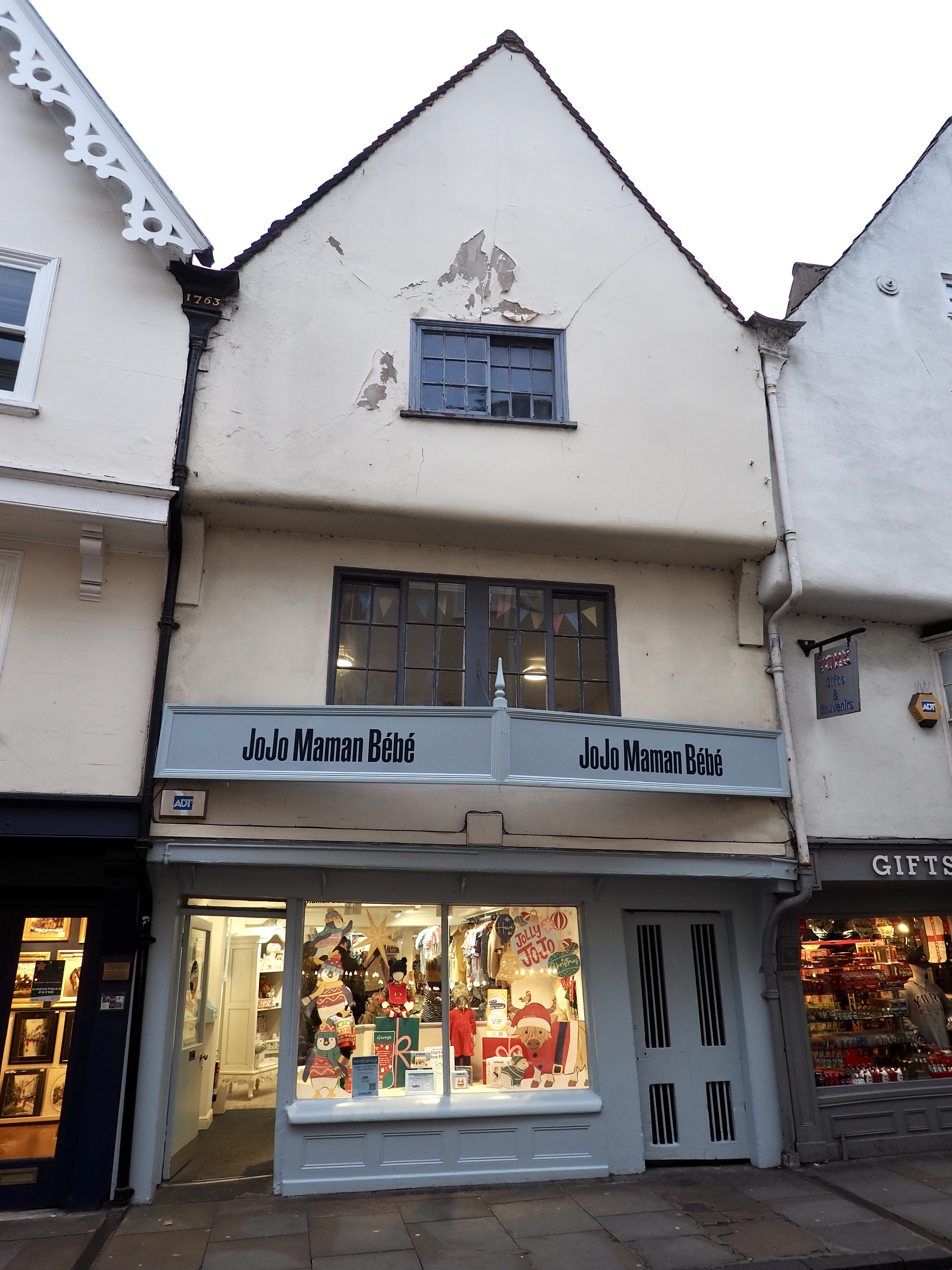
- The building in 2022
- Interactive map of the 81 Low Petergate area
- Former names: 50 Low Petergate

General information
- Type: Shop (originally a house)
- Location: Low Petergate, York, England
- Coordinates: 53.9607°N 1.0812°W
- Year built: 15th century
- Renovated: Early 18th century (rear rebuilt); 19th century (shopfront)

Listed Building – Grade II*
- Official name: 81, Low Petergate
- Designated: 14 June 1954
- Reference no.: 1257389

81 Low Petergate is a Grade II* listed building on Low Petergate in the city of York, England. Built as a house in the 15th century, it was rebuilt at the rear in the early 18th century and enlarged at various points, with its front adapted for shop use in the 19th century. The building became part of the Central Historic Core conservation area in 1968. It stands between No. 79, also listed at Grade II*, and No. 83, listed at Grade II, and is now occupied by JoJo Maman Bébé.

== History ==
Originally built as a house in the 15th century, the building was later rebuilt at the rear in the early 18th century and has been enlarged at several points since. Its front was adapted for shop use in the 19th century. It was formerly known as 50 Low Petergate.

On 14 June 1954, No. 81 was designated a Grade II* listed building, and in 1968 the site was included within the newly established Central Historic Core conservation area. It stands between No. 79, also listed at Grade II*, and No. 83, listed at Grade II. No. 81 is now occupied by JoJo Maman Bébé.

== Architecture ==
Built with a timber frame and later given a stuccoed front, the building has an orange‑brown brick rear and a tiled roof with brick chimneys. It rises three storeys to a single gabled front, with the upper floors projecting slightly over the street. The ground floor has a shopfront with a two‑light window and a shaped sill, set above panelled risers, with a part‑glazed door to one side and a later passage entrance to the other. The upper floors contain Yorkshire sash windows, with larger panes on the first floor and narrower ones above. At the back, the upper storey has a small casement window set beneath a shallow brick arch. Internally, little of the original fabric survives, apart from an exposed cambered tie‑beam with a curved brace to the central truss on the second floor.

== See also ==
- Grade II* listed buildings in the City of York
- Listed buildings in York (within the city walls, northern part)
