= Petergate =

Street in York, England

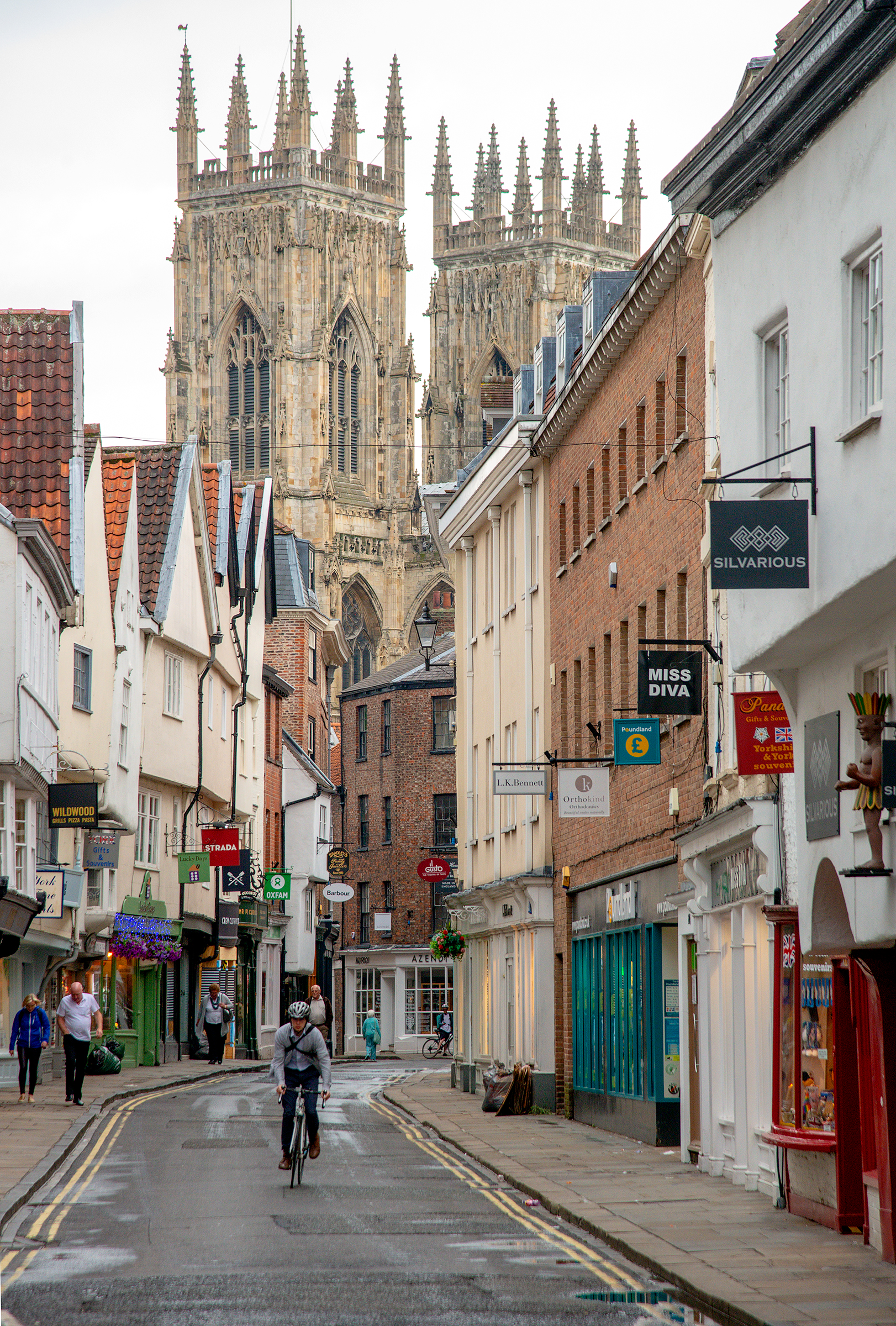
- View north-west along Low Petergate, with York Minster in the background
- Location within York
- Location: York, England
- Coordinates: 53.9614°N 1.0824°W
- North west end: Bootham
- Major junctions: Duncombe Place; Precentor's Court; Minster Yard; Stonegate; Minster Gates; Grape Lane
- South east end: King's Square

Petergate is a street in the city centre of York, England. It is divided into High Petergate and Low Petergate. The well-known view of York Minster from Low Petergate is described by the City of York Council as "excellent".

== History ==
Petergate generally follows the course of the via principalis of Roman Eboracum, which ran from the Porta Principalis Dextra, now Bootham Bar, to the Porta Principalis Sinistra, in what is now King's Square. The main deviation from the Roman route is around its junction with Grape Lane, and this has been associated with destruction occurring when the Great Heathen Army entered York in 866. Based on archaeological records, the York Civic Trust argues that the street fell out of use immediately after the Roman period, but was re-established while the Roman walls still survived. This may have been as early as 627, when the first York Minster was built. In its early years, the minster had a large cemetery, which extended as far as Petergate, around its junction with Stonegate.

The current property boundaries largely date from the 10th century, and the street has always been a desirable area, with its junction with Stonegate a particularly high-status location. In the medieval period, the street lay immediately outside the precinct of the minster. As the minster is dedicated to Saint Peter, this led to the name "Petergate", which was first recorded in about 1190. In 1283, a wall was constructed around the precinct, with gateways opposite Duncombe Place and Stonegate. Buildings on the north-east side of the street were built up against the wall. Almost the whole street lay within the parish of St Michael-le-Belfrey, the church, on the street and next to the Minster, having been first recorded in 1294.

The street remained important over the following centuries, and in the 17th century, the Talbot Inn was established, one of the main inns in the city. In the 18th and 19th centuries, parts of the street were rebuilt, and buildings around the front of York Minster were demolished, to open up access to it. Despite this, numerous Mediaeval buildings survive, all in commercial use.

== Layout and architecture ==
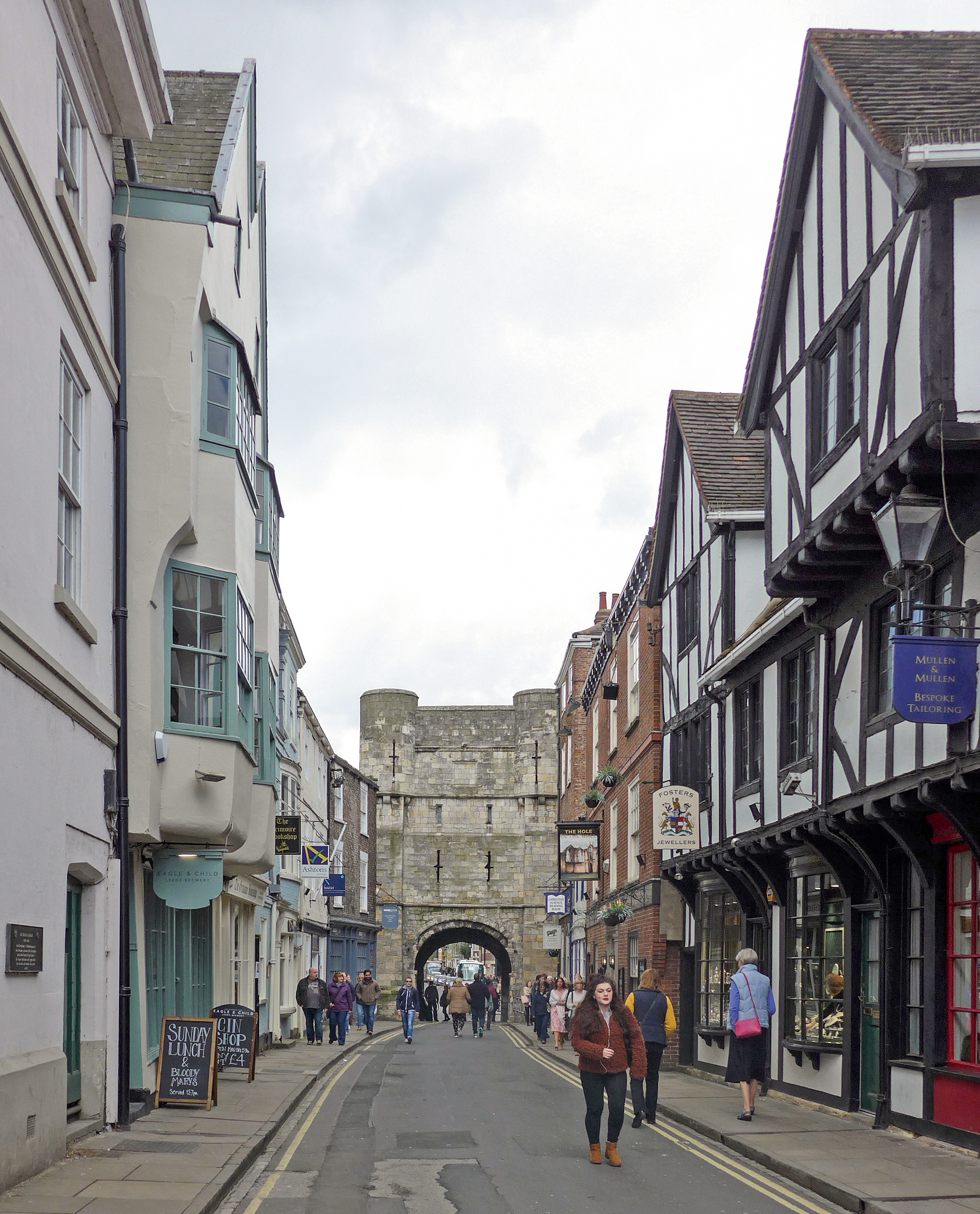
Looking north along High Petergate, towards Bootham Bar

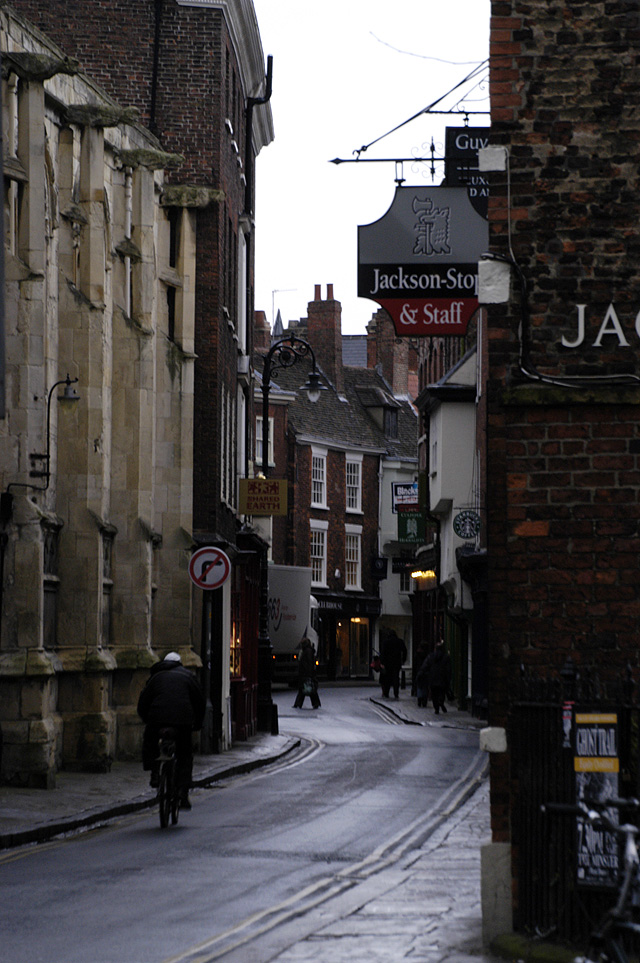
View south on High Petergate, towards Low Petergate

High Petergate starts at Bootham Bar on the York city walls, where Bootham terminates, and it runs south-east. Immediately beside the walls is the Grade-II listed building at 2–2A High Petergate, built around 1840 and today occupied by The Fat Badger inn. The Hole-in-the-Wall snickelway (also known as Little Peculiar Lane), the shortest official snickelway in the city, leads off its north-east side. At the front of York Minster, it opens up to form a major junction with Duncombe Place, Precentor's Court and Minster Yard, with access also to Dean's Park. The next junction is with Stonegate and Minster Gates, past which the street continues as Low Petergate. Grape Lane leads off the south-west side, as does the snickelway Lund's Court, while another snickelway, Hornpot Lane, leads off the north-east side. The street ends at King's Square, where it meets Church Street and Goodramgate. Until the creation of King's Square in the 18th century, it was considered to continue slightly further, to a junction with St Andrewgate, Colliergate and King's Court.

The north‑east side of High Petergate includes No. 4 (1782, possibly designed by Peter Atkinson), No. 8 (with a 14th‑century roof truss), the Hole in the Wall pub (mostly 18th‑century but with some earlier timber framing), Nos. 12–18 (early 20th‑century range built in imitation of an earlier building which stood on the site), Nos. 24–36 (1838, incorporating Georgian fabric), St Michael‑le‑Belfrey church, and No. 38 (15th century). The south‑west side includes No. 3 (mostly early 18th century but with some earlier timber framing), No. 5 (16th‑century origins), No. 7 (16th century), the Eagle & Child pub (17th century), Petergate House (18th century), and Nos. 17–19 (17th century). Beyond Duncombe Place are No. 23 (Grade I), Nos. 25–29 (18th century), No. 31 (15th‑century origins), and Nos. 33–35 (timber‑framed).

The street numbering continues in Low Petergate, with Nos. 37–39. On the north-east side lie No. 40 (adjoining 2–8 Minster Gates), Nos. 48–50 (with some medieval stonework in the basement), Adams House (18th century), Nos. 56–60 (built by John Stockdale in about 1500), the former York College for Girls, Nos. 64 and 66 (incorporating part of the former Talbot Inn, and with 15th-century origins), No. 74 (built as a house in the 17th century), it formerly served as the Petergate frontage to the Old White Swan Inn. In 1552 both properties were in the possession of Robert Hall; No. 76 (15th century), and No. 78 (17th century). On the south-west side are Nos. 41 and 43 (14th century), Nos. 49 and 51 (medieval origins), Nos. 55 and 57 (both 17th century), No. 67 (14th century), and then a timber-framed row, seven of which have their gable ends facing the street: No. 71 (17th century), Nos. 73–77 (16th century), No. 79 (early 15th century), No. 81 (15th century), and No. 83 (built about 1600). No. 87 has 14th-century origins, No. 89 is 17th century, and Nos. 91–93 have some 17th-century material.
