= JoJo Maman Bébé =

UK maternity and baby clothing retailer

JoJo Maman Bébé Ltd
- Company type: Private
- Industry: Clothing retailer
- Founded: 1993; 33 years ago
- Founder: Laura Tenison
- Headquarters: London, UK
- Number of locations: 40 stores (2026)
- Products: Maternity clothing; Baby clothing; Children's clothing
- Website: jojomamanbebe.co.uk

JoJo Maman Bébé is a multi-channel retailer of children's clothing, baby clothing and maternity wear, with stores in the United Kingdom and Ireland. Founded as a mail-order seller in 1993, it was acquired in 2022 by Next and an investment group.

== History ==
JoJo Maman Bébé was launched in 1993 by Laura Tenison as a mail-order catalogue specialising in maternity wear and children's clothes, after she spent time in hospital following a car accident, where a young mother on her ward expressed frustration at the lack of variety in children's clothes available via mail order. As founder and managing director, Tenison was awarded an MBE for services to business in South Wales in 2004.

In addition to mail-order and online sales, the company later opened 45 brick-and-mortar stores by March 2012 and 87 by April 2022. JoJo Maman Bébé's head office is registered in Battersea, London.

The company was acquired in April 2022 by Next plc and an investment group led by the hedge fund Davidson Kempner, with Tenison stepping down as CEO and commercial director Gwynn Milligan succeeding her. In 2025, Mark Wright succeeded Milligan as CEO.

== Products ==
JoJo Maman Bébé is a British retailer specialising in baby, children's and maternity clothing. Its early product range was inspired by traditional French Breton-style nautical clothing, and the company later expanded into a broader range including nursery products, gifts and toys for babies, toddlers and pre-schoolers. JoJo has since become known for its focus on practical clothing and accessories designed for children and family life, as well as for its baby gifting range. In 2025, the company launched its JoJo Junior collection, expanding their size range to include older children.

== Awards ==
The company has been nominated for several distinctions, including:

- The Mother & Baby Awards, Best Baby Gift, 2026
- City Kids The Green Awards Fashion, Best Fashion Retailer, 2025
- HIT Heroes, Best Community Outreach Employer of the Year, 2023
- Dotties Awards, Best Performing Campaign of the Year by an Ecommerce Brand, 2022
- Progressive Preschool, Best Multiple Retailer of Preschool Products 2022
- Family Awards Gold Winner, Best Toddler Fashion Brand, 2018
- Ecomd Direct Commerce Awards, Best Overall Business and Outstanding Customer Service, 2017
- NPPA Ireland, Best Health and Well Being Product for Mum (Breastfeeding Pillow), 2017
- Progressive Preschool, Best Preschool Retailer and Best Multiple Retailer Initiative, 2017
- Zazu, Best Retailer Award, 2016
- Little London, Best Maternity Fashion, 2016
- Little London Magazine, Best Online Retailer, 2015
- Circular Economy Champions Awards, 2015
- Leading Wales Awards, Best Company Award 2010
- Prima Baby Reader Awards, Best Children's Wear Website and Best Maternity Lingerie, 2010
- Drapers Children's Wear Retailer of the Year 2009
- Prima Baby Fashion Awards, Best Catalogue/Mail-order Service 2008
- Member of Courvoisier Future 500 of Fashion & Retail 2007
- Pregnancy & Birth Best for Underwear Bloom Award 2007
- Prima Baby Pregnancy Reader Awards Best Buy, Mail Order 2007
- Fast Growth Business Awards, Retail/Leisure Female Entrepreneur and Retail Business of the Year, 2007
- Practical Parenting Baby & Toddler Fashion Award and Maternity Fashion Award, 2007
- Nominated a Superbrand in 2005

== Social Responsibility ==
JoJo Maman Bébé was the first children's wear brand in the UK to achieve a B Corp (Better Corporation) certification, demonstrating a commitment to people, planet and profit. Reflecting that commitment, the company incorporated certified materials into its mix, including GRS recycled materials, FSC-certified wood and organic cotton. Donation and community grant campaigns such as From A Mother To Another and Helping Hands support this pledge.

In 2025, JoJo Maman Bébé partnered with thelittleloop to launch their pre-loved clothing platform JoJo Reloved, intending to help families trade in outgrown clothes so they stay in circulation for longer.
