= More House =

Listed chaplaincy in York, England

- University of York Catholic Chaplaincy
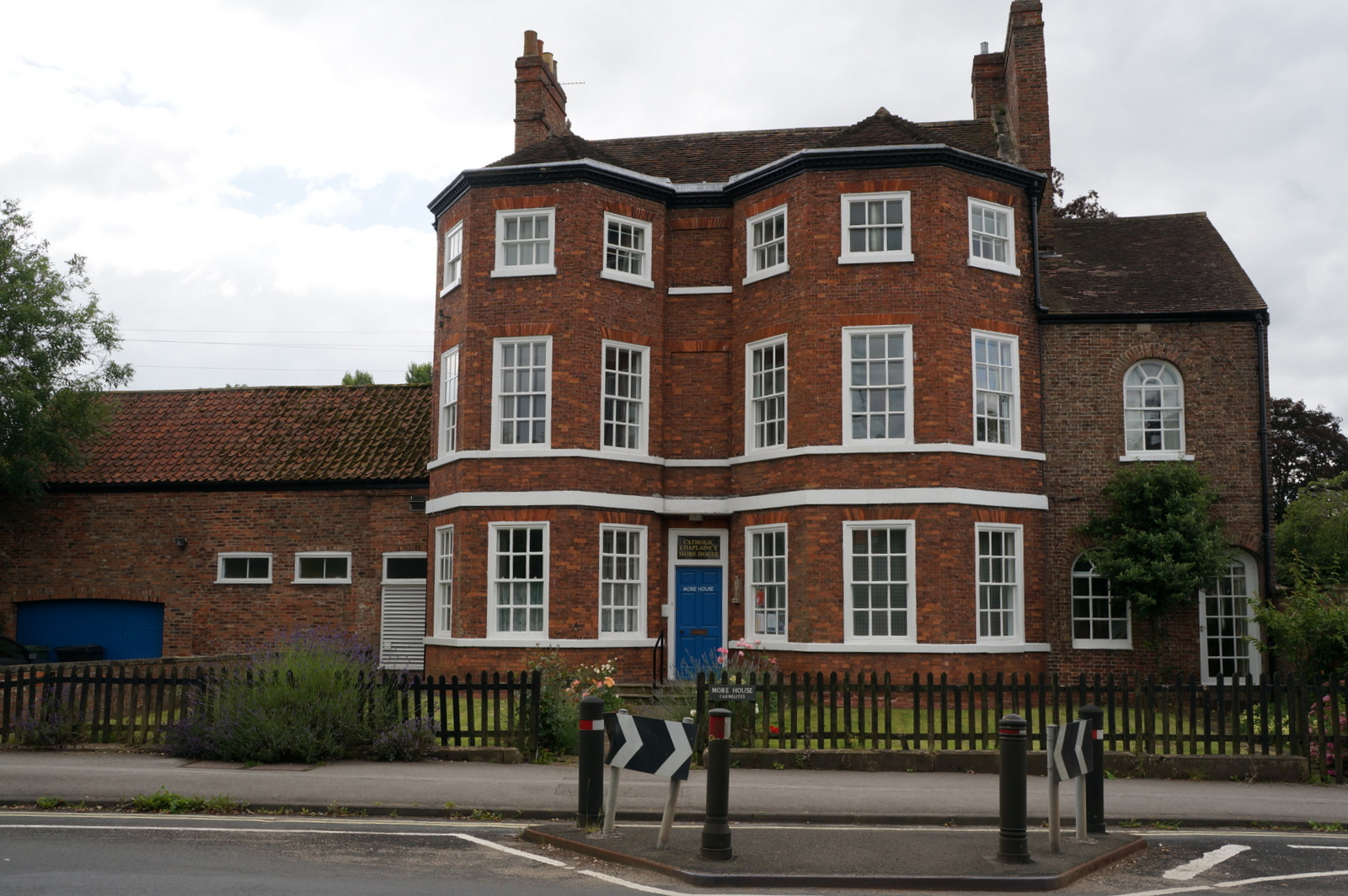
- More House
- 53.94441°N 1.04973°W
- OS grid reference: SE 624 502
- Location: Heslington, York
- Country: England
- Denomination: Roman Catholic
- Tradition: Oratory of Saint Philip Neri
- Website: UYCC.org

History
- Former name: The Old Vicarage
- Dedication: Saint Thomas More

Architecture
- Functional status: Active
- Heritage designation: Grade II
- Designated: 17 November 1966
- Years built: 18th century

Administration
- Diocese: Middlesbrough
- Deanery: Saint Wilfrid

More House is the Catholic chaplaincy for the University of York in Heslington, York. The building itself dates from the late 18th century. The chaplains were formerly Carmelite friars resident in the building, but since 2021 priests from York Oratory have been ministering to the chaplaincy. It is located on Main Street in Heslington, which is towards the south edge of the university's Campus West. It is a Grade II listed building.

== History ==
In the late 18th century, the house was constructed. From 1809 to 1814, Sydney Smith lived there while his rectory in Foston was being rebuilt. The stables of the house were used to house Charles XII, who won the St Leger at Doncaster in 1839. From 1869, the parish of St Paul's Church in Heslington was styled as a vicarage, having previously been a perpetual curacy. No parsonage existed until 1871, when the townhouse was provided by the Yarburghs. In 1965 a new house on School Lane, Bede House, opened as the parsonage and for the Anglican chaplaincy. Bede House was built by York Diocese. The last vicar to live there sold half of the grounds to himself in 1964 to retire to, where he built Orchard House. In the 1960s the house became owned by the Diocese of Middlesbrough and renamed More House after Saint Thomas More. In 1967, the Catholic chaplaincy was started at More House. The first Catholic chaplain was a Benedictine monk from Ampleforth Abbey. However, the university chaplaincy was founded in 1964. The current chaplaincy operates on a ecumenical covenant signed 24 November 1998, which has been reaffirmed on several occasions. Copies of these confirmations are framed in the main common room of More House.

Dom David Knowles stayed at the house during a visit to the university in 1970.

Until 1995 More House was largely student accommodation, while the chaplains has been solitary residents or non-occupants. In 1995 a Carmelite community of five friars was established at More House, and two of the friars began working as full-time chaplains at the university. The arrival of a permanent monastic community caused some resistance from fringes of the Christian community at the university, with some members of the Christian Union refusing to enter More House. Efforts to build links both with the Christian community, but also with Jewish and Muslim communities, who grew accepting of the new arrangement through shared events and being able to hold their own events at More House. With time, More House hosted the Jewish Society's Purim on a regular basis, as well as the Christian Union's Alpha Course and even the Pagan Society's summer picnic. Connections were made beyond spiritual communities, and York Pride felt comfortable to hold events at More House. When some raised concerns that the Carmelites were being welcoming to groups at odds with Christian doctrine, the Carmelites highlight how central the virtue of vacare Deo (openness to God) is to their order. The Carmelites continued to serve as the chaplains of the Catholic community until 2021.

The Carmelites previously worked in York from 1250 to 1538 at York Carmelite Friary, but they surrendered their friary during the Reformation.

In 2021, Oratorians from the Oratory Church of Saint Wilfrid in York were invited to minister to the chaplaincy, with Fr. Richard Duffield appointed as chaplain.

== CaSSoc ==
CaSSoc
- Catholic Students' Society
- Named after: Cassock
- Type: Student Society
- Purpose: The support of the Catholic Faith in the University of York
- Location: More House, York
- Co-President: Alexander Steel; Emily Harrison
- Affiliations: University of York Students' Union
- Website: cassocyork.weebly.com
- Formerly called: The Thomas More Society

More House hosts most meetings of the University of York Catholic Students' Society (CaSSoc), which occur every week during term time on Thursdays. In October 2022 the CaSSoc St Vincent de Paul group (SVP1833) held a sponsored sleepout in the grounds of More House to raise funds to cover the cost of a campaign to support the homeless in York. Seven members of the group participated, which raised £730. In the 2021 YUSU Awards Extravaganza, CaSSoc won in the 'Faith Society' category. In the YUSU Activity Awards 2023, CaSSoc won 'Faith Society of the Year.

The Catholic society at the university were originally The Thomas More Society (TomSoc), with St Thomas More as their patron. He remains the patron of the CaSSoc. The name initially changed to Cassoc, before changing to the current form of CaSSoc.

The society is run by a committee, with a recent tradition dictating that of the two co-presidents, one is male and one female. However, during February 2025 two male co-presidents were elected due to the absence of female candidates. An older tradition is that of the position of Dennis, who is responsible for the traditions of the society. Events are hosted throughout the academic year and are a great variety, from rosary nights, guided reflections, and speakers to pub crawls, film nights, and religious-themed parties.

== See also ==
- Petergate House
- York Oratory
