= York Oratory =

Listed church in York, England

- Oratory Church of Saint Wilfrid, York
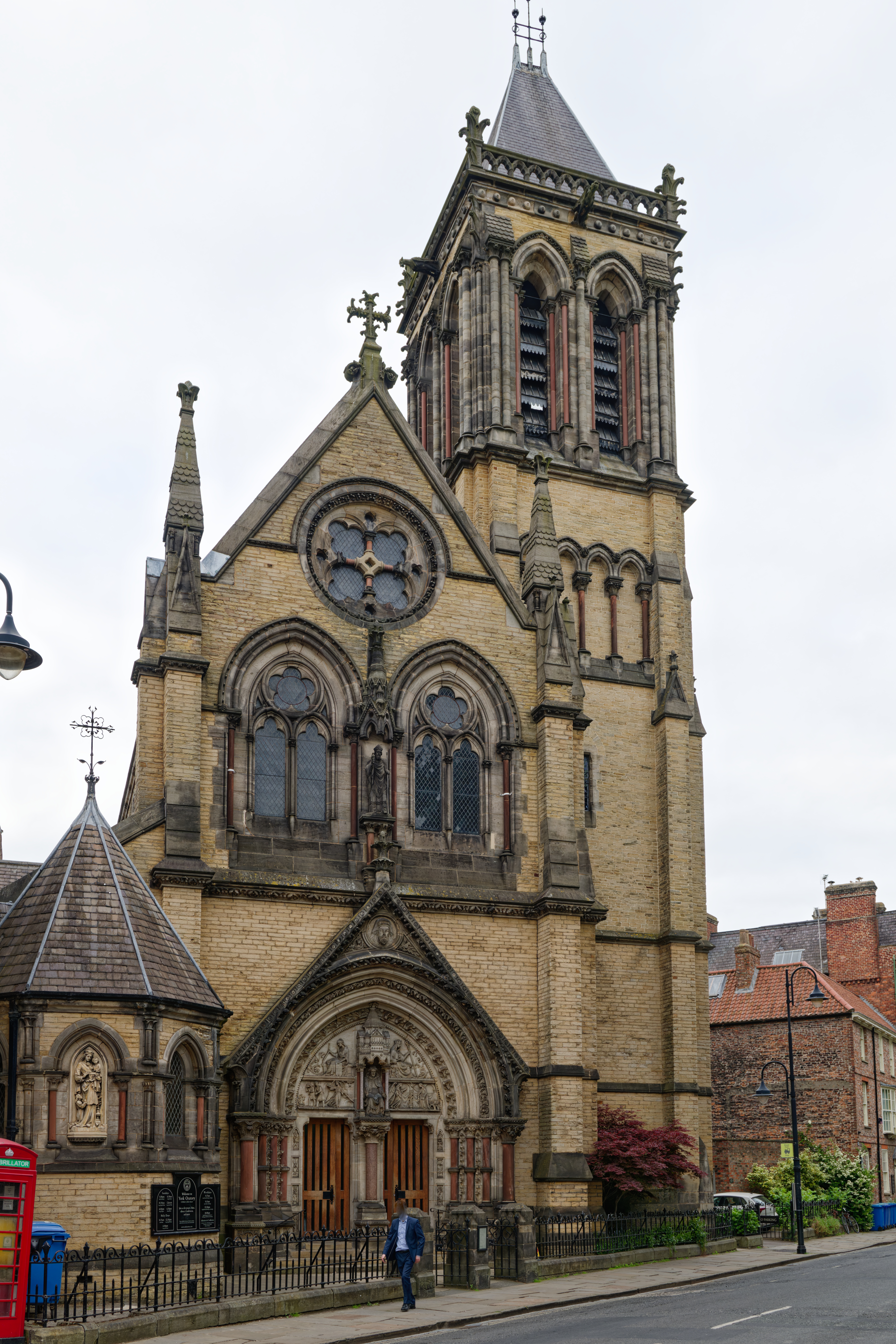
- The building in 2024

- Location within North Yorkshire
- 53.961819°N 1.084766°W
- OS grid reference: SE 60151 52127
- Location: Duncombe Place, York
- Country: England
- Denomination: Roman Catholic
- Tradition: Oratory of Saint Philip Neri
- Website: yorkoratory.com

History
- Dedication: Saint Wilfrid
- Consecrated: 14 July 1945

Architecture
- Heritage designation: Grade II listed
- Architect: George Goldie
- Completed: 1864
- Construction cost: £10,000

Specifications
- Length: 96 feet (29 m)
- Width: 51 feet (16 m)
- Height: 147 feet (45 m)

Administration
- Province: Archdiocese of Liverpool
- Diocese: Diocese of Middlesbrough
- Parish: Saint Wilfrid, York

Clergy
- Priest(s): Very Rev'd Fr Richard Duffield, Cong. Orat. (Provost), Rev'd Fr Daniel Seward, Cong. Orat. (Parish Priest) Rev. Fr. Stephen Brown, Cong. Orat. Rev. Fr. David Chadwick, Cong. Orat.

The Oratory Church of Saint Wilfrid, York (or York Oratory for short) is a Catholic church in York, England. It is located on Duncombe Place, just down the road from York Minster. While there is evidence of a church dedicated to Saint Wilfrid in York dating back to the medieval times, the current church building was constructed from 1862 to 1864 in the Gothic Revival style. It is a Grade II listed building.

== History ==
In the early 1500s, Saint Wilfrid's was an advowson of the Benedictine Saint Mary's Abbey, York.

By 1585 the parish could no longer support itself. The church fell into disuse and was ultimately demolished. It was eventually built over and the parish united with Saint Michael le Belfry.

Saint Wilfrid's parish was revived in 1742 when a Catholic mission was established in Little Blake Street under Thomas Daniel. The Mission was founded by the Vicar Apostolic of the Northern District of England, Edward Dicconson. It became the centre of Catholic worship in York. The Mission was established at number 7 Little Blake Street (now Duncombe Place), which was called Chapel House. The chapel continued until 1802 when another chapel was built on the opposite side of the street. At this time there were still strong anti-Catholic feelings, so the chapel was built in a Noncomformist design. The chapel could hold 700 people but the Catholic population continued to grow, so plans were drawn up to build a larger and a more architecturally authentic Catholic church. The new church would be built on the same site as the chapel. The foundation stone was laid in April 1862 by Bishop Cornthwaite. The construction was completed in 1864, with the cost amounting to £10,000. Cardinal Wiseman opened the church in June 1864. It was considered to be "one of the most perfectly finished Catholic Churches in England, rich in sculpture, stained glass and fittings".

The construction coincided with the York Corporation's plan to build a new approach road to Lendal Bridge. This involved the widening of Little Blake Street and the destruction of houses on the East side of the street, including the original house where the mission started. The church was built to be attractively positioned on this new route.

Once completed, Saint Wilfrid's became the Pro-Cathedral Church of the Beverley Diocese. This ended in 1879 when the diocese was split into the Diocese of Leeds and Diocese of Middlesbrough according to the River Ouse.

In 2013, the Bishop of Middlesbrough invited the Fathers of the Oxford Oratory to establish an oratory and entrusted Saint Wilfrid's to them. In November 2019, the York Oratory was established as an independent house.

== Present church ==
The Church of St Wilfrid is often known by Catholics as the "Mother Church of the City of York", since its history connects it to the first, hidden revival of the Catholic faith in this city.

== Architecture ==
Part of the porch way, believed to belong to the original Saint Wilfrid's Church, was found under the floor of the Assembly Rooms during the 19th century renovations.

The church became a Grade II listed building in 1968.

It is in the French Gothic Revival style. The arch over the main door is the most detailed Victorian carving in York.

The architect of the building was George Goldie.

=== Tower ===
The tower is some 147 feet (45 m) tall and is visible around much of York. The design of the tower makes it appear as though the oratory is taller than the Minster in the background; it is only when a person has passed the Oratory Church that they can see the Minster is taller.

The tower holds a fine peal of ten bells, in addition to an Angelus bell (added in 2019 and named "John Henry") with the heaviest eight bells dating from 1938. The chime was cast at the foundry of Gillett & Johnston in Croydon, and installed at Saint John's Church in Thornham. The bells became available in 1993, and relocated to Saint Wilfrid's. Two lighter bells were added in 1995 to create a peal of ten. They were cast by John Taylor & Co of Loughborough. One is inscribed "Saint Wilfrid"; the other bears the inscription "Ringers ring with one accord. Make beautiful music to praise the Lord".

=== Furnishings ===
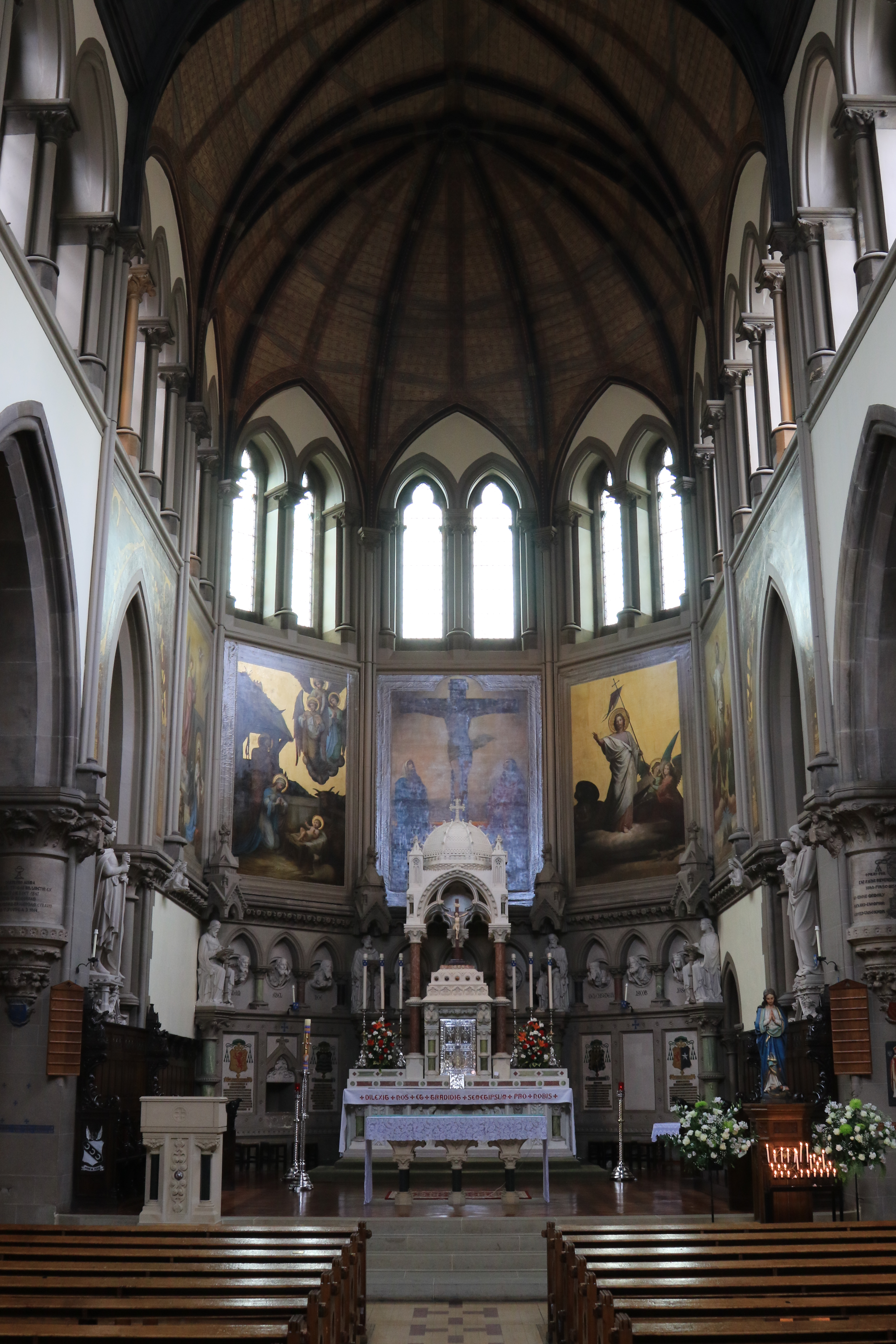
Interior of the Oratory Church of Saint Wilfrid

The altar rails at the Oratory are very fine and of particular note. They were made in 1948 by Wilfrid Dowson, from Kirkbymoorside, who was responsible for some work at York Minster, as well as the Queen's Gates at Saint George's Chapel in Windsor Castle. The rails were altered and temporarily removed in February 2007. The organ is an 1867 Forster and Andrews, restored in 1998 by Harrison & Harrison.

== Parish ==
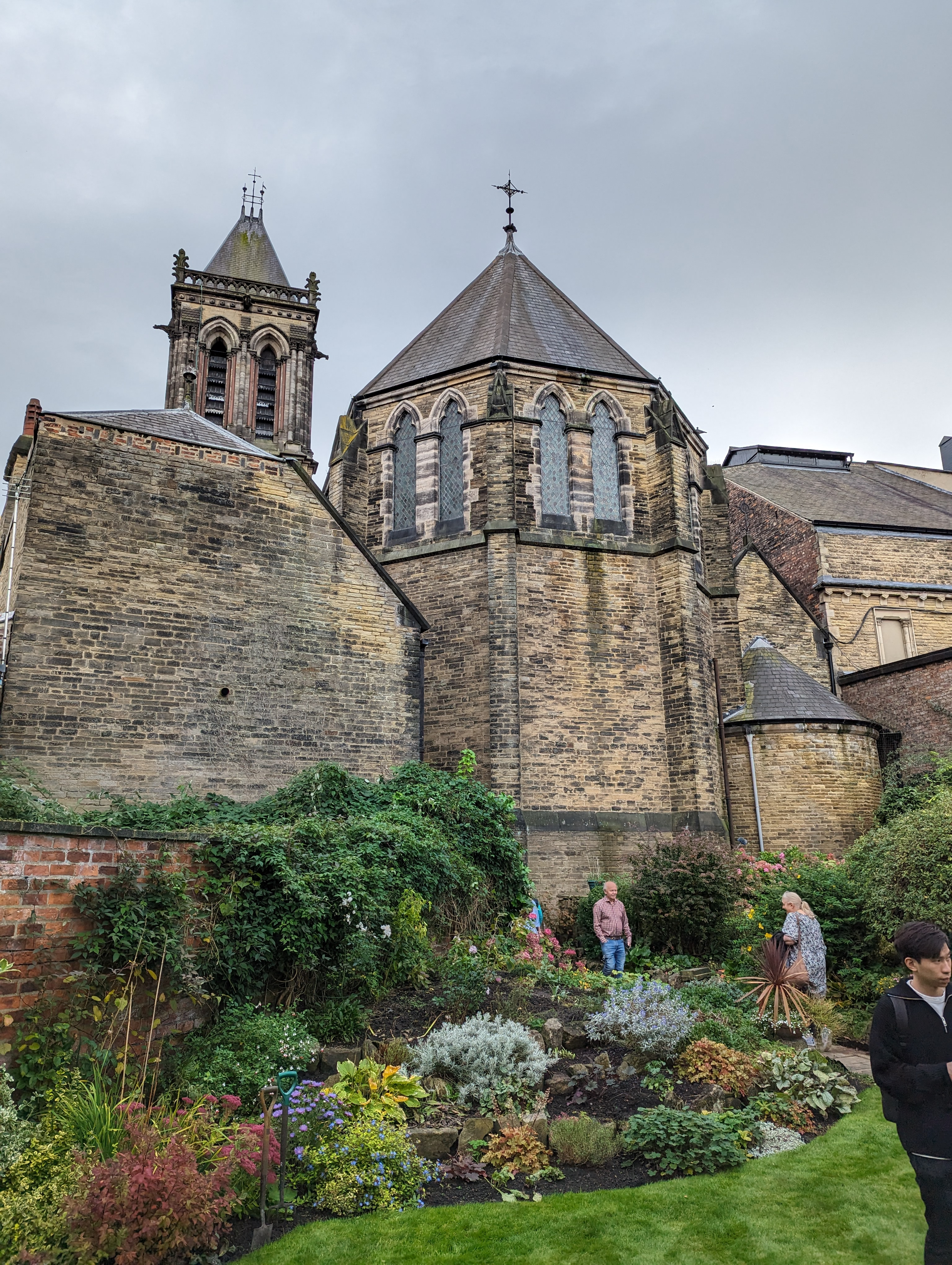
Rear of the church, seen from the garden

The church has daily Mass. The Traditional Latin Mass is celebrated at 8:15 am from Monday till Friday, 9:15 am on Saturday (Low Mass) and on Sunday at 12:00 pm (Sung Mass). The Novus Ordo Mass is celebrated in English at 12:10 pm daily, 5:00 pm on Saturday (Vigil Mass) and on Sunday at 8:30 am (Low) and 10:30 am (Sung).

The church has sung Vespers at 4:00 pm and (immediately following) Benediction at 4:30 pm every Sunday.

The Oratory is known for its high standard of music. A voluntary choir sings at the 10.30 am English Mass, and professional singers at the 12 noon Latin Mass, performing chant, polyphony and other works from the Catholic choral tradition.

The Oratory offers four choral scholarships through the University of York to both undergraduate and postgraduate female and male students: sopranos, altos, tenors and basses to form a quartet.

The church's rectory is in Petergate House.

== See also ==
- Listed buildings in York (within the city walls, northern part)
- More House
- Petergate House
