= Petergate House =

Listed building in York, England

Coordinates: 53°57′44″N 1°05′04″W

- Oratory House
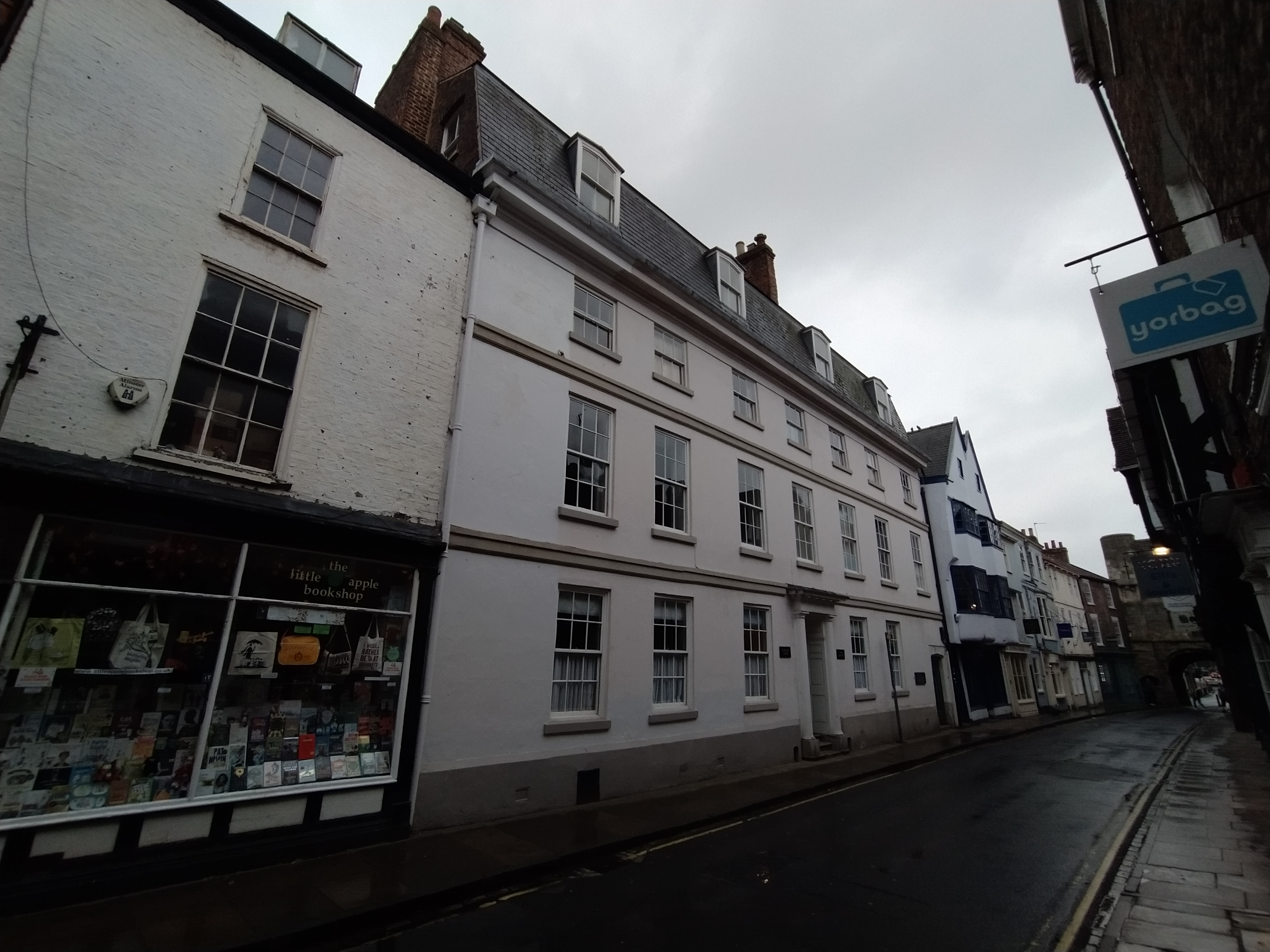
- Petergate House in 2021
- Petergate House
- Location: High Petergate, York, England
- Denomination: Roman Catholic
- Tradition: Oratory of Saint Philip Neri

History
- Former name: The Rectory

Architecture
- Functional status: Active
- Heritage designation: Grade II*
- Designated: 14 June 1954
- Years built: Early 18th century

Petergate House (or Oratory House) is a Grade II* listed building on High Petergate in the city centre of York, England.

A previous building on the site was constructed in about 1500, and its later owners included Thomas Herbert and Henry Swinburne. William Turner bought it in 1723, and largely demolished it, only a single passageway surviving. The new house was of three storeys and seven bays, with a stucco front, lined to resemble stonework, while the rear is of brick.

In the 19th century, a new mansard roof was added, as was a two-storey semicircular bay to the rear. The interior was also largely remodelled, and the staircase was altered and moved. From the original fittings, several fireplaces survive, as does much of the decoration of the left-hand front room on the ground floor. The top of the staircase includes some reused balusters from about 1700.

The building serves as the rectory for the York Oratory. It is the home of the Fathers of the Oratory and its garden is occasionally opened to the public.

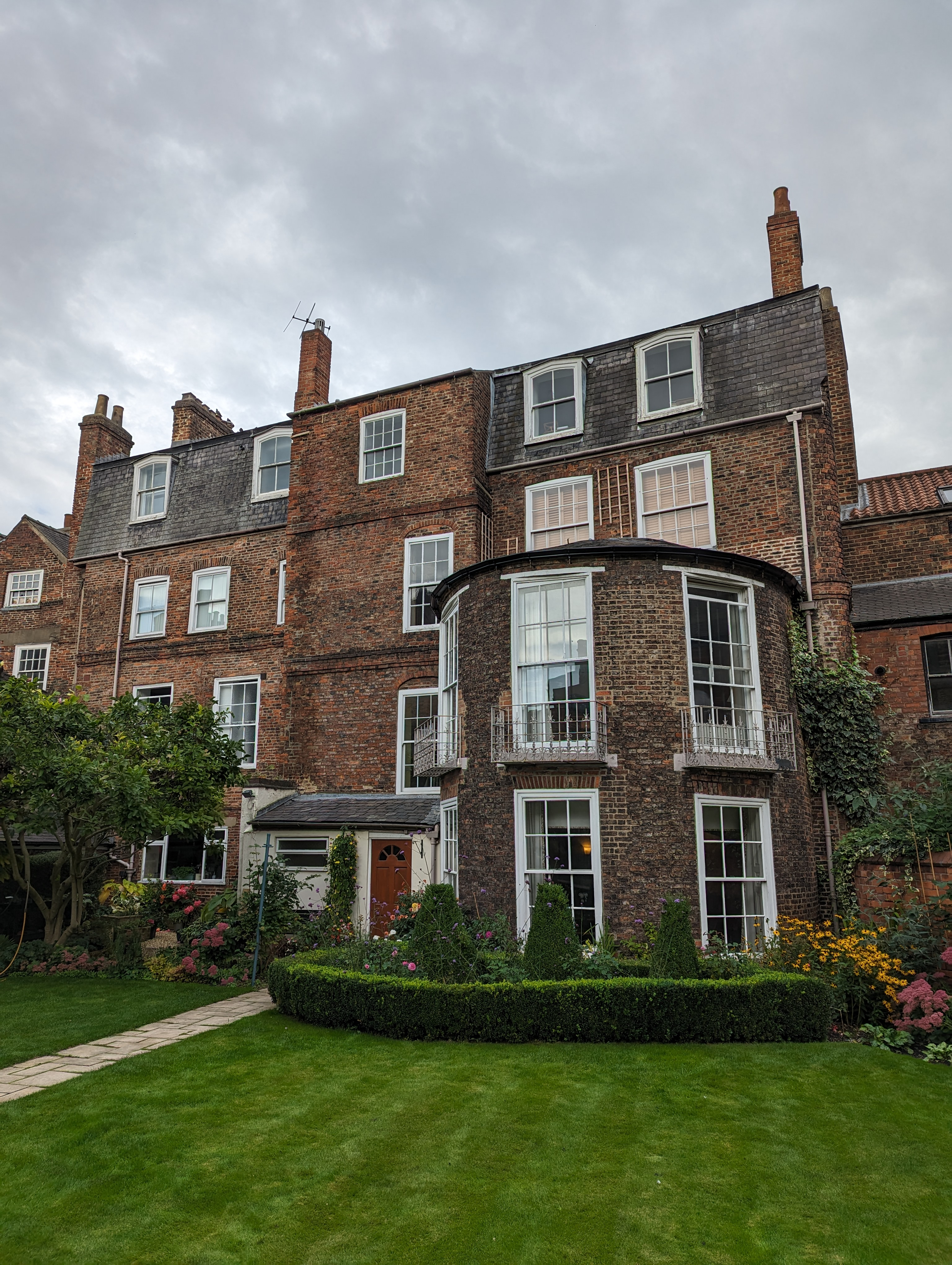
Rear of the house, seen from the garden of York Oratory

== See also ==
- Grade II* listed buildings in the City of York
- Listed buildings in York (within the city walls, northern part)
- More House, the Catholic chaplaincy for the University of York
