= Purey-Cust Chambers =

Listed building in York, England

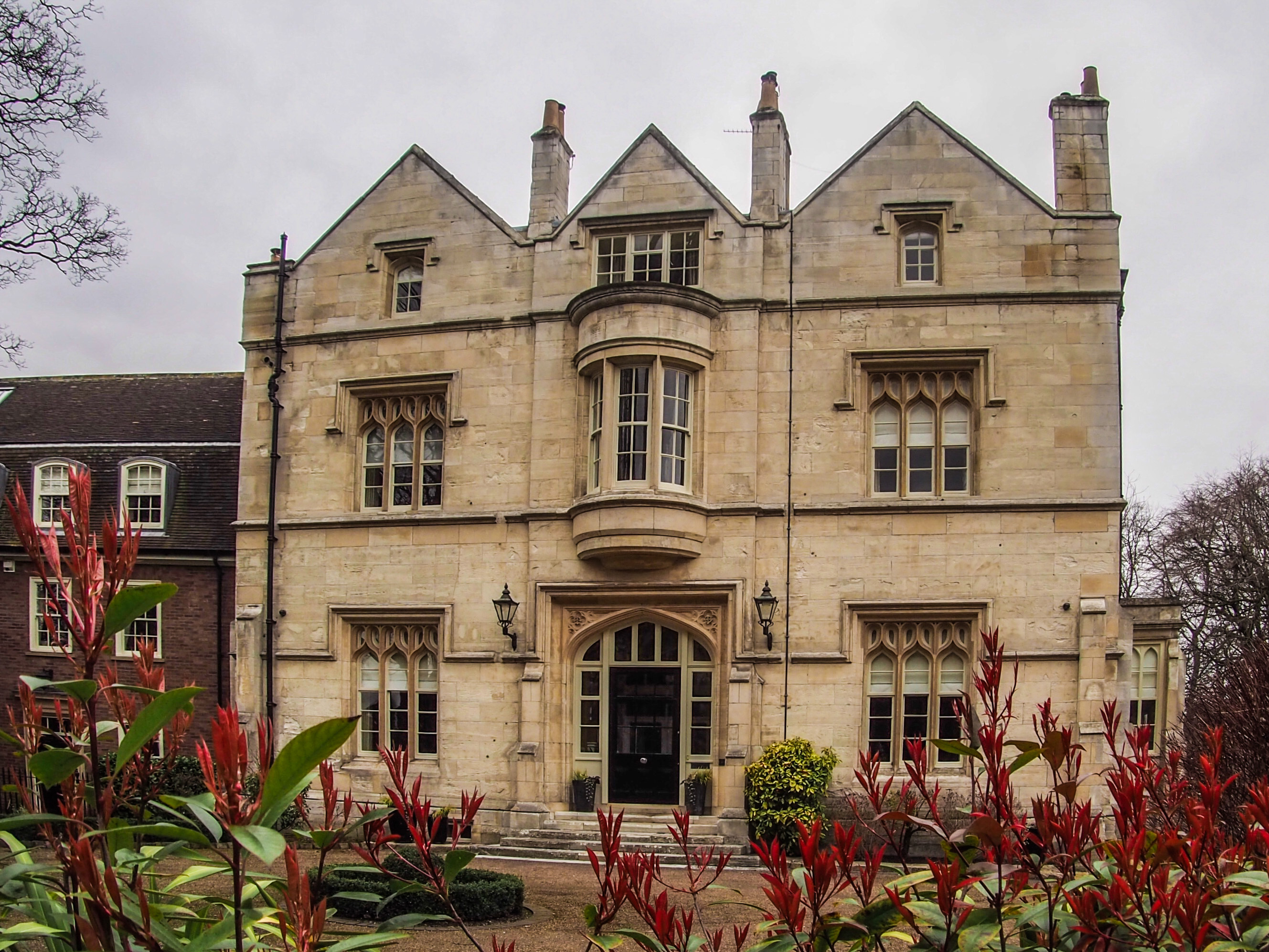
- The building in 2023
- Interactive map of the Purey-Cust Chambers area

General information
- Architectural style: Gothic
- Location: Dean's Park, York, England
- Coordinates: 53.963038°N 1.083616°W
- Completed: 1825 (201 years ago)

Design and construction
- Architect: Richard Hey Sharp

Listed Building – Grade II
- Official name: Purey Cust Chambers
- Designated: 24 June 1983
- Reference no.: 1257882

Purey-Cust Chambers is a historic building in York, England. It stands beside Dean's Park, which is overlooked by York Minster. Now Grade II listed, it dates from 1824–25, and is adjoined to the northern end of the more modern Purey-Cust Lodge. The site it occupies was formerly that of York Minster Stoneyard.

The building was designed in the Gothic style by Richard Hey Sharp for York Minster's Dean and Chapter.

== Architecture ==
The front is built in Magnesian Limestone with a slate roof edged in stone and ashlar chimneys.

The building has two storeys with attic rooms, set on a moulded plinth and marked by stepped buttresses, with three gabled bays. Stone steps lead to a glazed, flush‑panelled door set in a square frame with a four‑centred head and carved spandrels, flanked by small buttresses. The ground‑floor windows on either side have three ogee‑arched lights with tracery, all beneath tall hood moulds. Above, the centre bay has a semi-circular oriel with three eight‑pane sashes, a deep frieze and a moulded cornice; the outer first‑floor windows match those below, all on a continuous sill band. Attic windows are square‑headed with hood moulds: the centre has three altered lights, the outer ones each a single light with a four‑centred head, with a moulded band above.

The right return has two storeys and an attic, arranged in five bays with a gabled centre. A flat‑roofed porch projects at the left, its former doorway converted into a tall two‑light window with mullions, transoms and a moulded parapet. To its right is a half‑glazed door with a tall overlight. Most windows are paired lancets, those on the ground floor with transoms and square heads under hood moulds, and those above on a sill band. Over the porch is a two‑leaf glazed and panelled door. The attic gable contains a later two‑light window, with a moulded band above.

== See also ==
- Listed buildings in York (within the city walls, northern part)
- Purey-Cust Lodge boundary wall
