= Purey-Cust Lodge boundary wall =

Grade II listed building in York, England

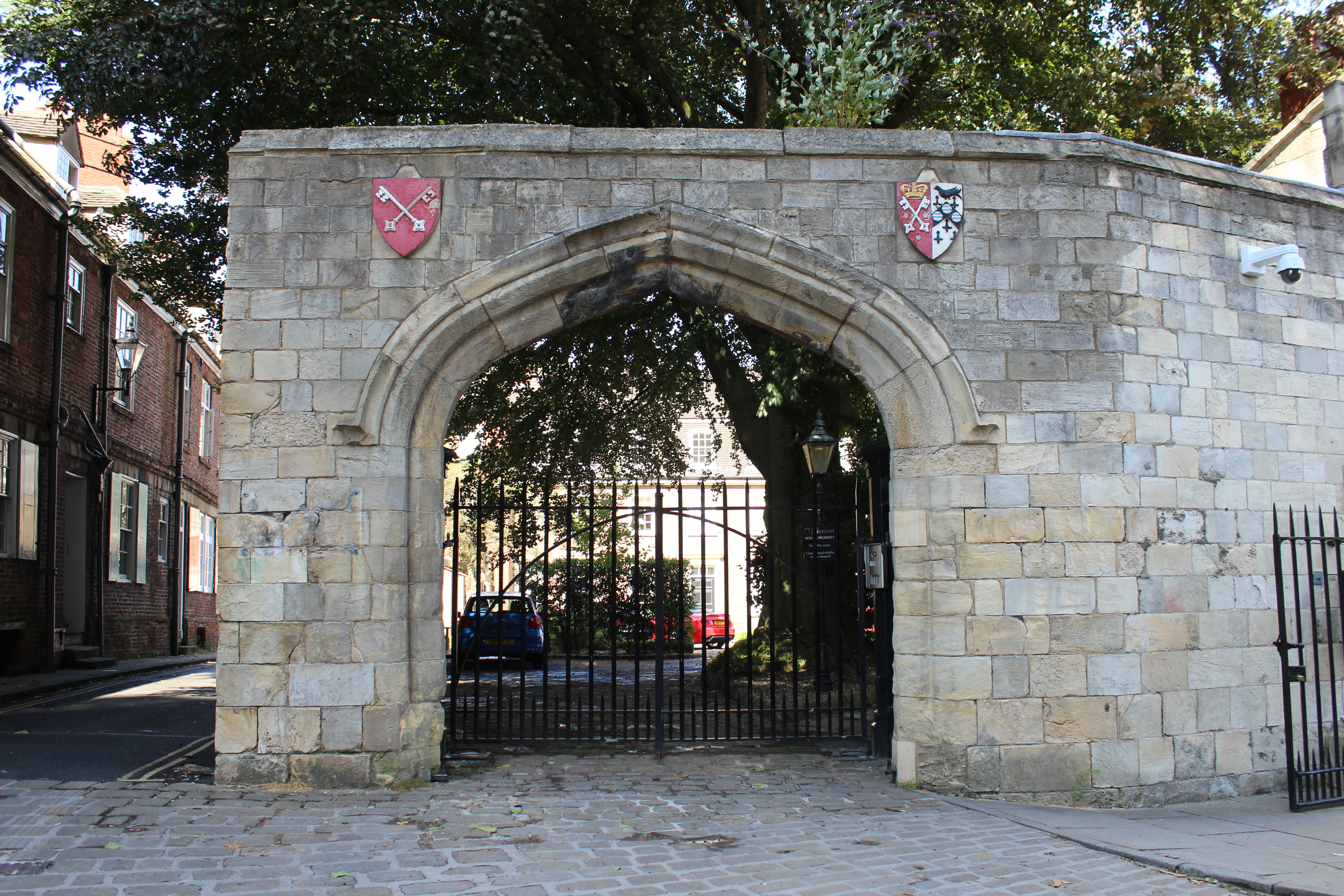
- Interactive map of the Purey-Cust Lodge boundary wall area

General information
- Location: Purey-Cust Lodge, York, North Yorkshire, England
- Coordinates: 53.96257613°N 1.08351359°W
- Completed: 19th century

Purey-Cust Lodge boundary wall is an historic structure in the English city of York, North Yorkshire. A Grade II listed building, it dates to 1845.

Originally the lodge, walls and gateways to the stone yard of York Minster, since around 1916 it has functioned as the entrance and boundary wall of Purey-Cust Lodge.

The height of the wall varies from around 6 metres (20 ft) in its main section, up to around 8.5 metres (28 ft) at the rear of the lodge and down to around 4.5 metres (15 ft) for the section that runs along Precentor's Court.

There are three gates, two of which feature nail-studded boarded gates; the third is an iron gate providing access to lodge's driveway. This gate is flanked by the coats of arms of St Peter and the Deanery of York.

To the right of the iron gate, the wall is habitable. It features windows, at two levels, of single or paired square-headed lights with diamond lattice glazing. On the garden side, the lodge is of two low storeys. The ground-floor windows include one- and two-light small- and large-pane casements, as well as a 2x2 and a 2x6-pane Yorkshire sash. On the first floor, there are three 2x2s. The interior of the walls has not been inspected.

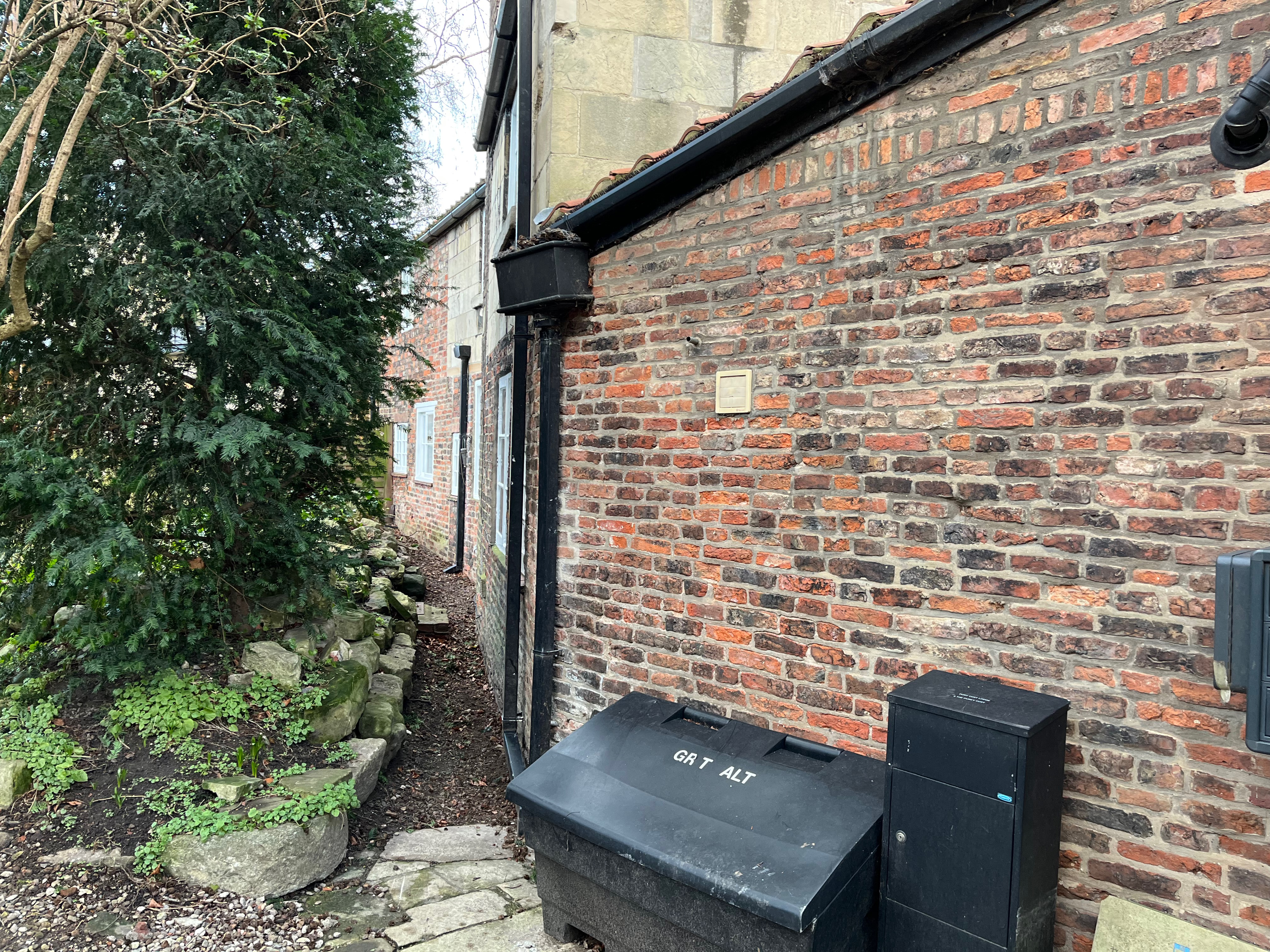
Windows on the interior of the wall to the right of the main gate

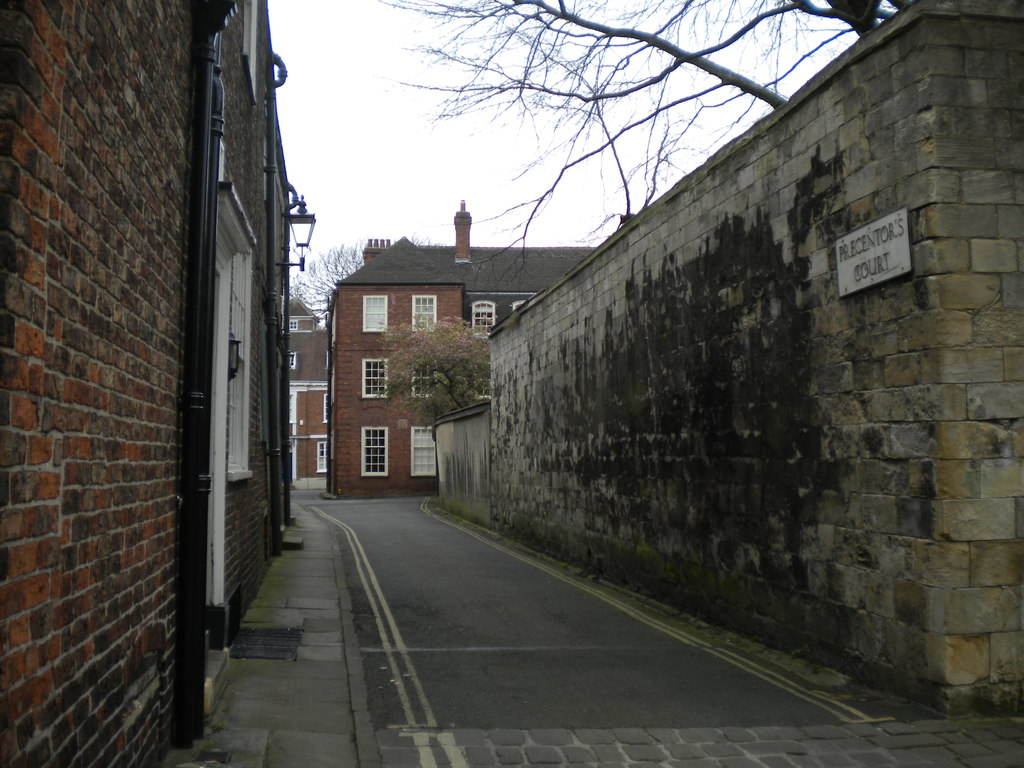
The wall forms the northern side of most of Precentor's Court

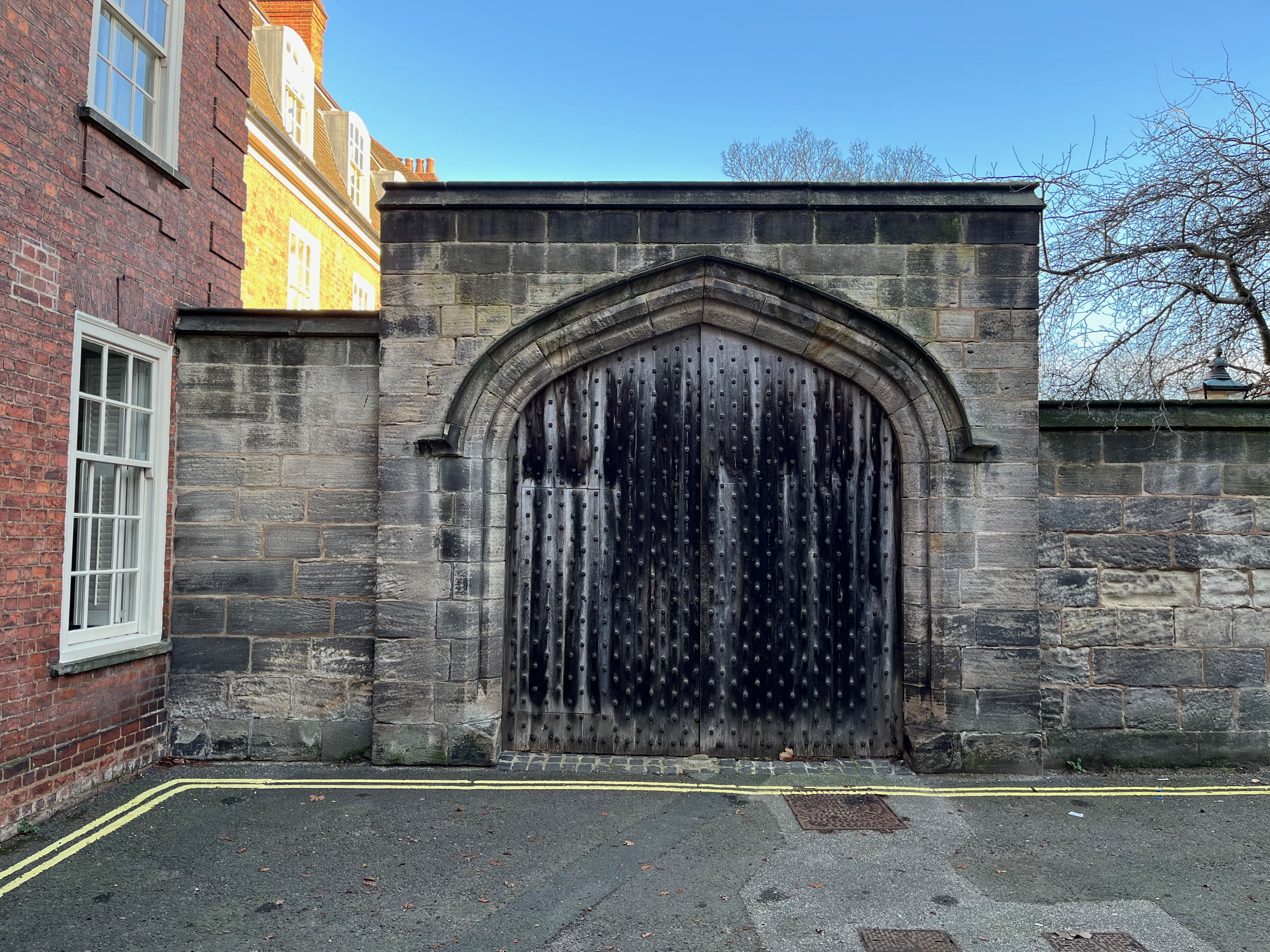
Gate into Purey-Cust Lodge from Precentor's Court

== Composition ==
Per Historic England, the wall is composed of orange-brown and orange-grey brick "in various bonds", as well as magnesian limestone ashlar. The pent pantile roof has brick stacks. The side of the wall facing Precentor's Court is rendered and incised, while the interior side is orange brick in an English garden-wall bond. The copings are moulded stone or pantile.

== See also ==
- Purey-Cust Chambers
