= Dean Park =

Dean Park may refer to:

- Dean Park, New South Wales, Australia, a suburb of the City of Blacktown
- Dean Park Cricket Ground, a cricket ground in Bournemouth, England
- A park in Kilmarnock, Scotland

See also:

- Dean's Park, a park in York, England
