= Archbishop's Palace, York =

Grade I listed building in York, England

Archbishop's Palace
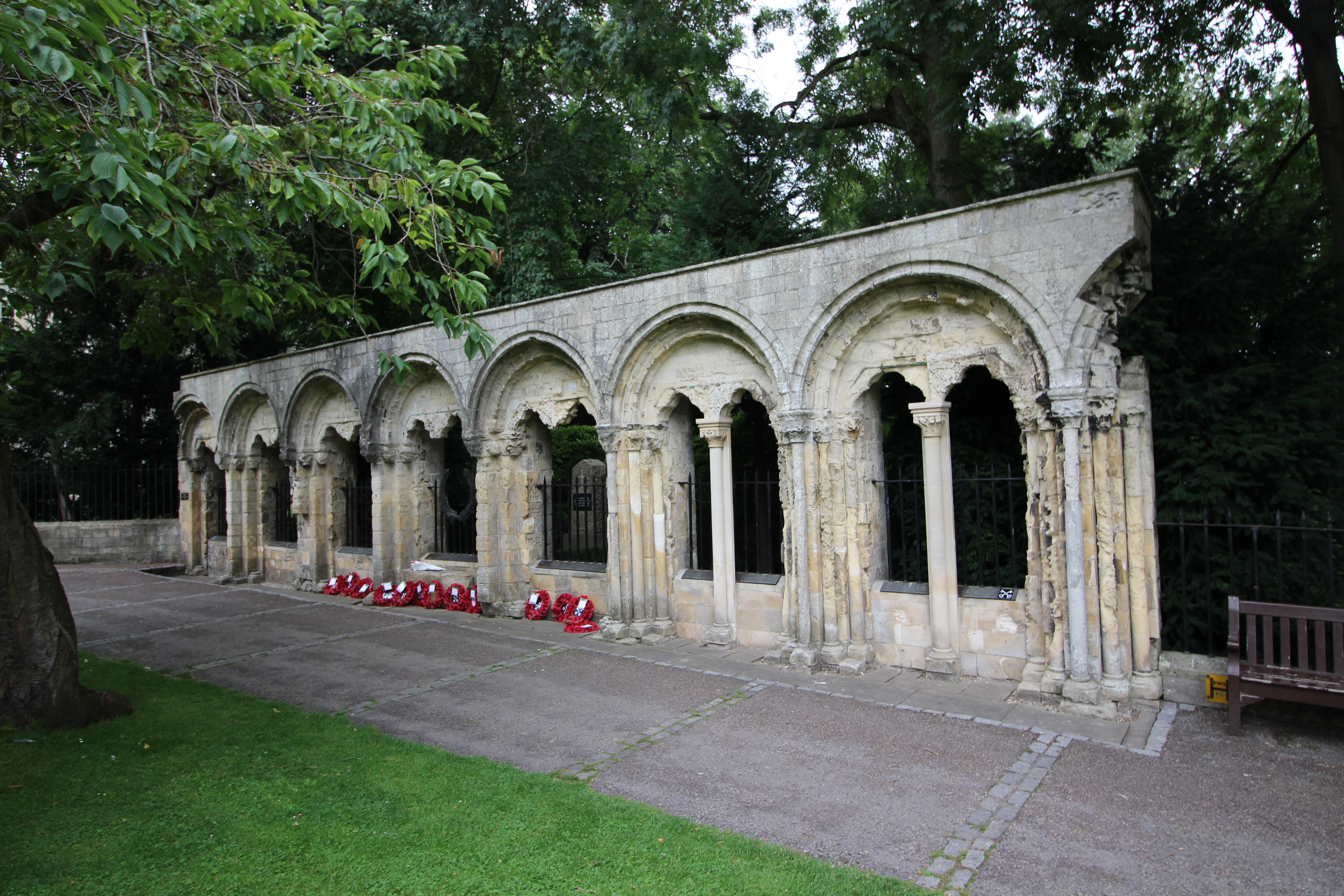
- 12th-century arcade from the palace

- Location within York City Centre

General information
- Status: Ruins
- Location: Dean's Park, York, England
- Coordinates: 53.9632°N 1.0830°W
- Year built: Late 12th century
- Renovated: 1987 (restored)

Listed Building – Grade I
- Official name: Arcade of former Archbishops Palace and attached railings and gates
- Designated: 14 June 1954
- Reference no.: 1257919

The Archbishop's Palace was the residence of the Archbishop of York during the later Middle Ages. It lay immediately north of York Minster, and its grounds are now known as Dean's Park.

== Construction ==
York Minster was severely damaged by a fire in 1137. Roger de Pont L'Évêque, Archbishop of York from 1154 to 1181, rebuilt the minster, and appears to have also begun the construction of the palace. In 1179, the college and chapel of St Mary and All Angels, also known as St Sepulchre, was built next to the palace, and the history of the structure became intertwined. In 1268, the grounds of the palace were extended up to the city walls.

The palace was used for a wide variety of purposes. The justices of oyer and terminer sat there in 1275, while in 1327–1328, Edward III of England based his court at the palace while he was leading a campaign against the Scots; the palace was altered at great expense to host him. By 1385, it also housed the archbishop's prison, probably in the crypt below St Sepulchre's Chapel. In 1400, a new chamber was added from which Henry IV of England could watch a tournament being held in the palace grounds. Richard III of England stayed at the palace in 1483, as did Henry VII of England in 1487, and Margaret Tudor in 1503.

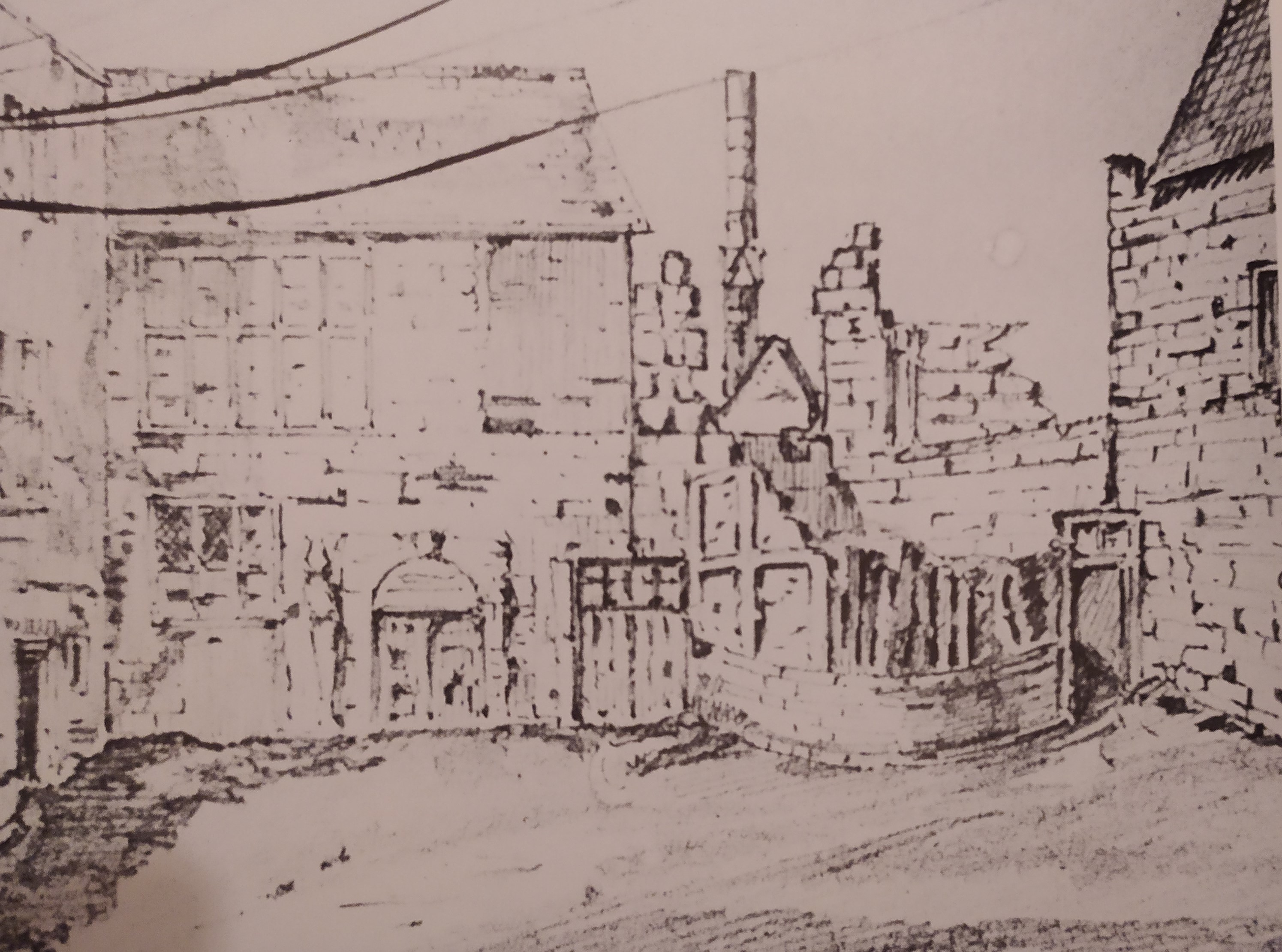
Ingram's House, shortly before demolition

St Sepulchre's College was dissolved in 1547, while in the 1560s, Thomas Young removed the lead from the palace's roof. This was supposedly to purchase Grays Court for his son, George, the building probably being extended in part with stone taken from the palace. By 1616, the palace was in ruins, and the grounds were sold to Arthur Ingram. He rebuilt part of the palace as his own house, and laid out gardens in the remainder of the grounds, which include a fishpond, tennis court and bowling green. Charles I of England stayed in the house in 1642, but after Ingram's death, his descendants divided the property into small tenements and let them out.

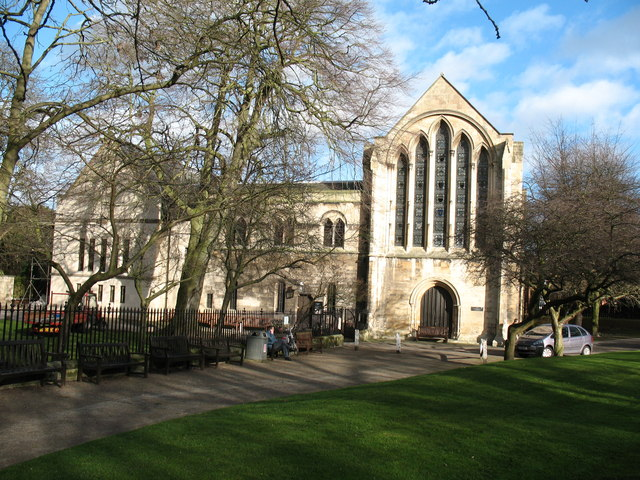
Minster Library, former chapel of the palace

In 1734, a theatre was built on the site of the tennis court. In 1780, the former great hall of the palace was rebuilt as a riding school, noted in 1785 as the site of an early balloon ascent. In 1799, a panorama depicting the Royal Navy at the Spithead review was displayed in the building. By this time, Ingram's house was largely in ruins. York Minster purchased the whole site in 1814, and demolished Ingram's house, using the site for its stone yard, and also demolished the riding school. The palace's former chapel was restored for use as the minster library, and is now known as the Old Palace. In 1823, the remainder of the site was again laid out as the Deanery Gardens. Demolition of some sheds revealed a 12th-century arcade from the original palace.

More recently, the grounds have become known as Dean's Park, and the stone yard has moved to Deangate. During the Second World War, the park was excavated to house water tanks, but it has since been restored. In 1987, the arcade was rededicated as a war memorial to the dead of the world wars and 19th-century conflicts, and since 1997 it has been Grade I listed.

== See also ==
- Grade I listed buildings in the City of York
- Listed buildings in York (within the city walls, northern part)
