= Purey-Cust Lodge =

Listed building in York, England

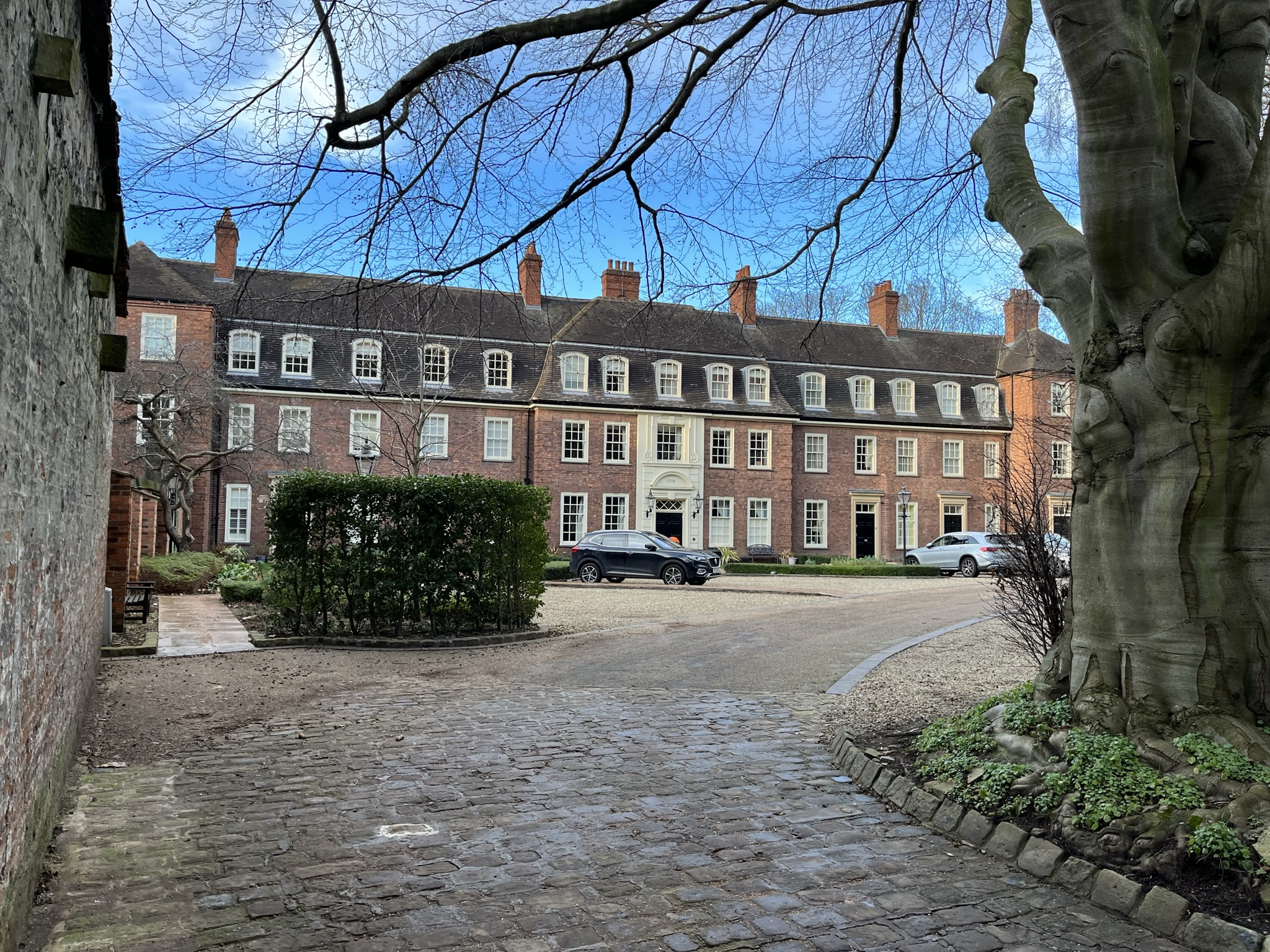
- The northern sections of the building in 2023. Its car park was built on the gardens of the property
- Interactive map of the Purey-Cust Lodge area

General information
- Status: Converted to residential
- Location: Dean's Park, York, England
- Coordinates: 53°57′46″N 1°05′03″W
- Completed: 1845

Design and construction
- Designations

Listed Building – Grade II
- Official name: Purey Cust Lodge, attached walls and gateways
- Designated: 24 June 1983
- Reference no.: 1257883

Purey-Cust Lodge is a historic building in the Dean's Park area of York, England. Now Grade II listed, it dates from 1845. Before its construction, the site was occupoied by the York Minster Stoneyard.

The lodge takes its name from Arthur Purey-Cust, who served as dean of York from 1880 to 1916.

Its southern boundary wall forms part of the western end of Precentor's Court, a medieval cul-de-sac. At the eastern end of the street is the gate leading to and from the lodge's former gardens. This gate once opened directly onto the Minster stoneyard, in the shadow of York Minster.

== History ==
In 1914, two years before his death, Arthur Purey-Cust funded the establishment of the Purey-Cust Nursing Home in the lodge, with its aim being to provide low-cost healthcare to those who could not afford such treatment at the normal rate.

After around three decades of success, the introduction of the National Health Service in 1948 made the nursing home's existence redundant.

In 1968, an agreement was reached with Nuffield Hospitals whereby, in return for a long lease on the property, Nuffield would fund a major refurbishment to the buildings, with the plan to use them as a private hospital.

After two decades, it was decided that Purey-Cust Lodge could no longer meet the requirements of a modern hospital. After Nuffield moved out, the buildings lay empty.

The Purey-Cust trustees sold the buildings in 2013 to a private developer. They were turned into high-end residential accommodation.

== Architecture ==
The lodge is built in orange‑brown and orange‑grey brick with dressed limestone, and has a pent roof covered with pantiles and finished with brick chimneys. Much of the surrounding wall is of squared limestone blocks laid in regular courses; the section facing Precentor's Court is rendered and lined to resemble stone, while parts of the inner face are in orange brick. The wall tops are finished either with moulded stone or with pantiles.

On the street side, the wall stands at roughly 6 metres (20 ft) high, rising to about 8.5 m (28 ft) behind the lodge and dropping to around 4.5 m (15 ft) along Precentor's Court. It contains three gateways, each formed by a four‑centred arch with moulded surrounds; two are closed with boarded gates studded with nails, while the third, which leads to the hospital, is open and marked by shields showing the arms of St Peter and of the Deanery of York. The lodge entrance is a boarded door with nail studs set in a shouldered arch to the right of the hospital gateway. Further along, windows on two levels have single or paired square openings with diamond‑pattern glazing set in chamfered surrounds.

On the garden side, the lodge has two low storeys. Ground‑floor windows vary in size and type, including one and two‑light casements with small or larger panes, a Yorkshire sash with two rows of six panes, and another with two rows of two panes. The first floor has three Yorkshire sashes, each with two panes over two.

== Notable staff ==
Margaret Morgan (1865–?) was matron of the York Nurses Home / Purey-Cust Nurses Home from 1905 to 1919. She trained at The London Hospital under Eva Luckes between 1888 and 1890, and then served five years as an assistant matron. From 1901 to 1904 she was matron of Addenbrooke's Hospital. During the First World War she was a matron in the QAIMNSR at the Haxby Road Extension Military Hospital in York between 1915 and 1917.

== Gallery ==
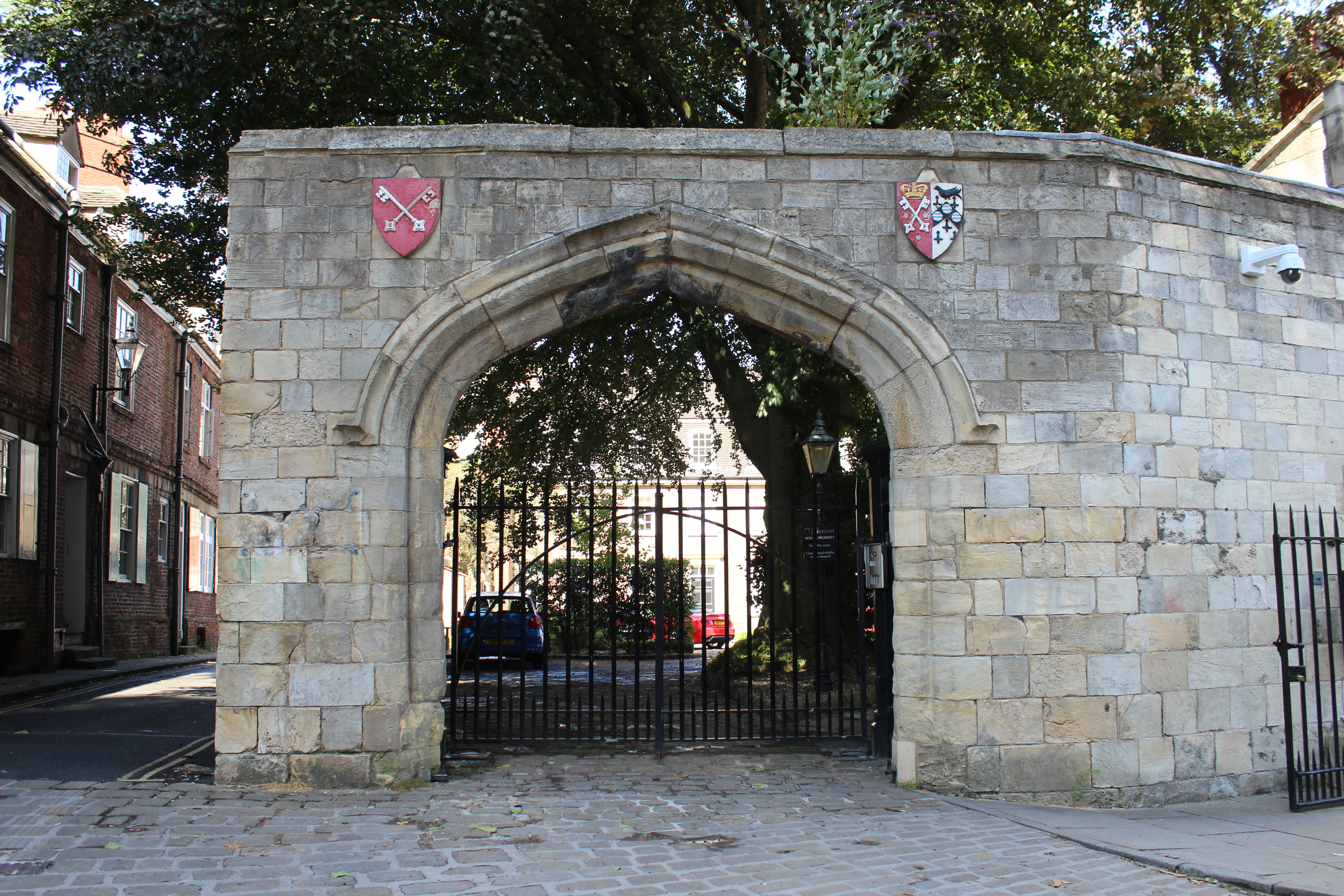
The gate to the lodge, beside Precentor's Court. The shields of arms belong to St Peter and the Deanery of York

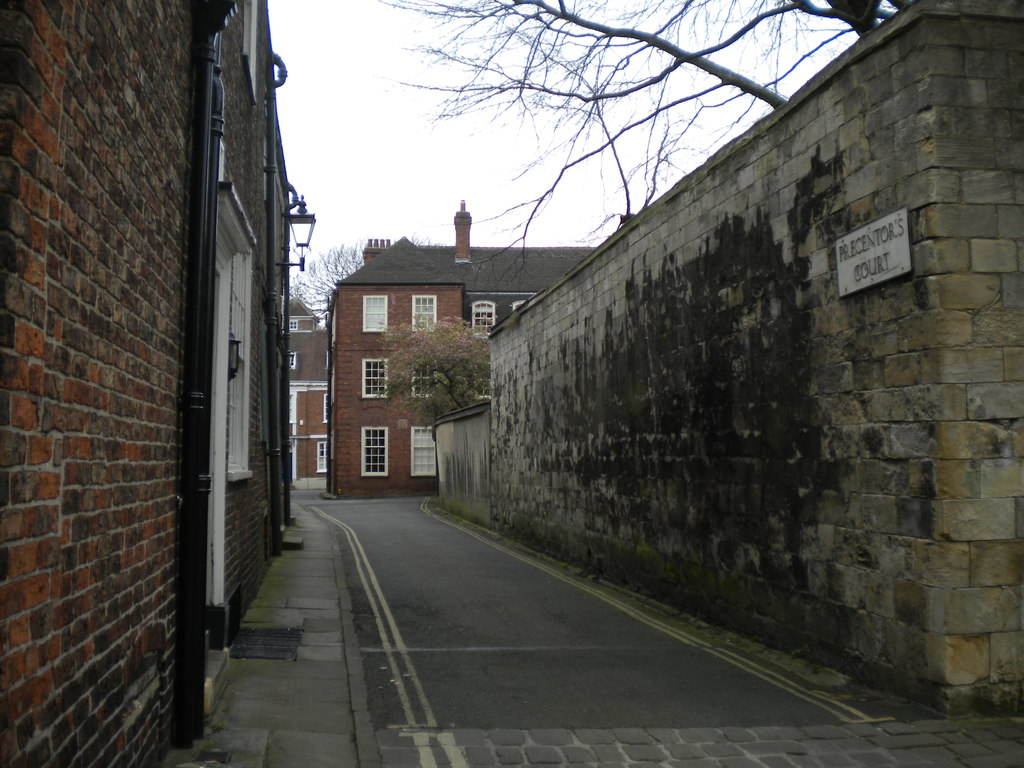
The southern end of the lodge protruding into Precentor's Court

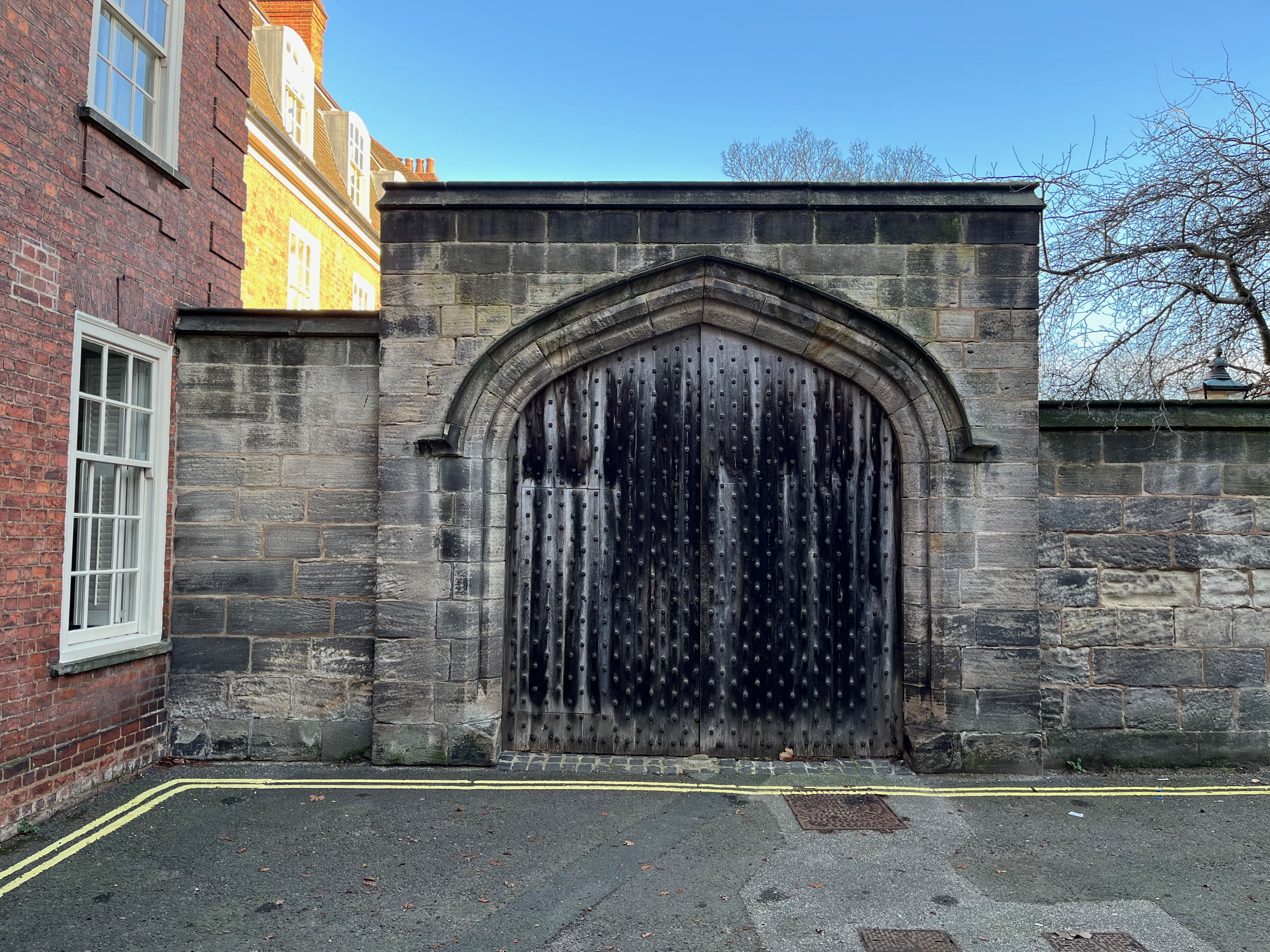
Gate into Purey-Cust Lodge from Precentor's Court

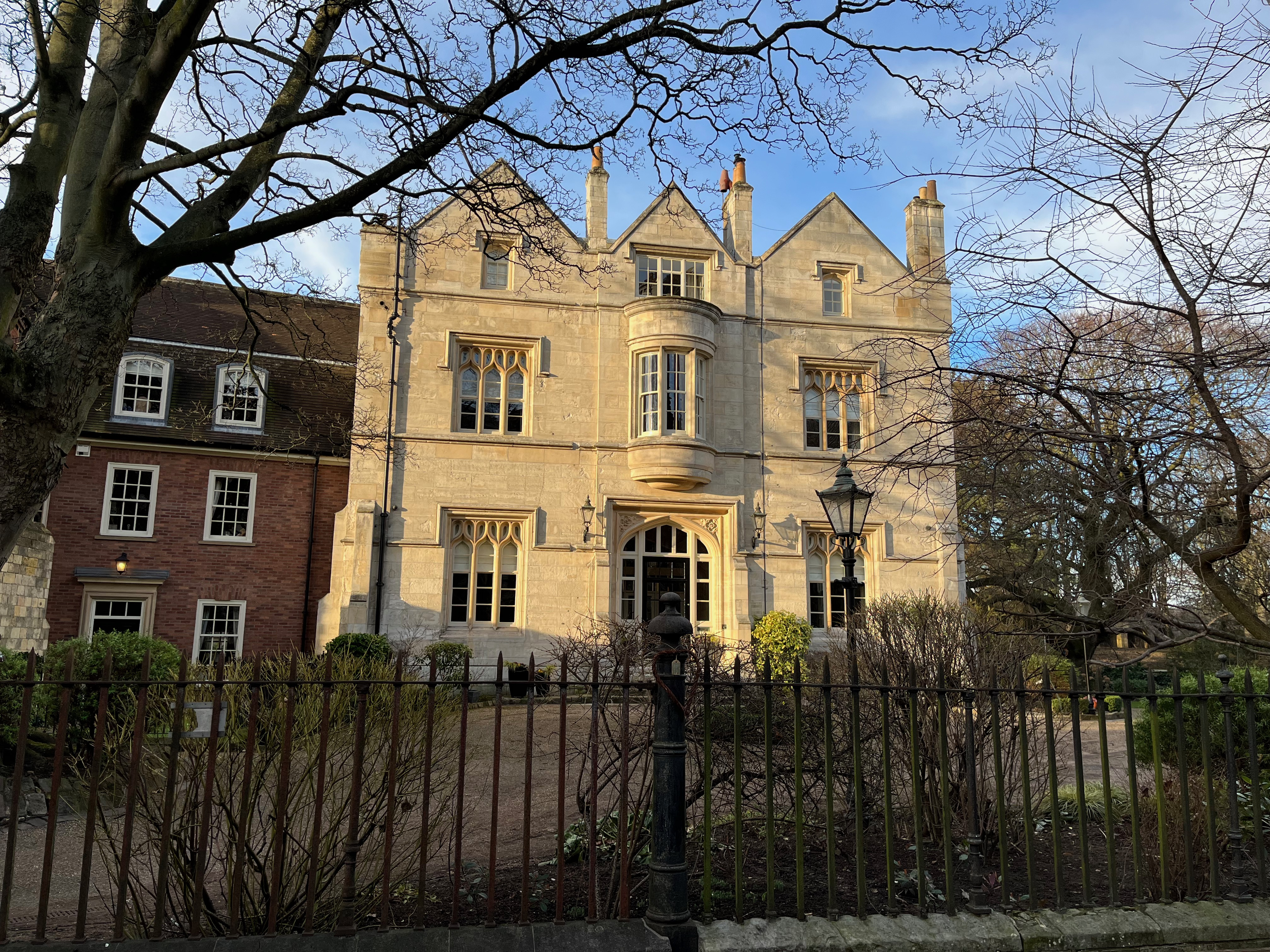
The older northern end, Purey-Cust Chambers, overlooking Dean's Park

== See also ==
- Listed buildings in York (within the city walls, northern part)
- Purey-Cust Lodge boundary wall
