= Nathan Drake (artist) =

English artist

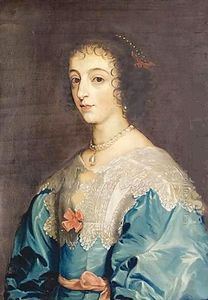
Portrait of Henrietta Maria by Drake

Nathan Drake (c. 1728 – 19 February 1778) was an English artist and a fellow of the Society of Artists.

== Biography ==
Lincoln-born Drake was the son of the Rev. Samuel Drake, rector of St Mary's, Nottingham. He was apprenticed to his uncle, a cabinetmaker in York, where he appears to have settled in 1752 and spent much of the rest of his life.

It is not known where he studied to be an artist. He worked as a portrait, landscape, topographical and sporting painter, and has been called "the archetypal painter of the provincial sporting scene". His hunting scenes often include a view of a country house, an example being William Tufnell and his Hounds at Nun Monkton Priory, York (signed and dated 1769; priv. col.).

In 1771 Drake was elected a fellow of the Society of Artists and two years later exhibited with the society.

Drake died on 19 February 1778, and was buried in the church of St Michael-le-Belfrey in York.

== Works ==
Some of his better-known works are:

- View of Boston (Lincolnshire), engraved by J. S. Muller in 1751—This is his earliest known work.
- A view Newport Arch, Lincoln (1751?) is in the Usher Gallery, Lincoln
- The South East View of the City of York was engraved on copper by Charles Grignion and published in 1756 under the title The Prospect of a Noble Terras Walk—This work has been called "undoubtedly the most ambitious graphic representation of York produced in the middle years of the eighteenth century". Two original paintings of this scene are in the York Art Gallery.
- Francis Drake (1756), was engraved in mezzotint by Valentine Green in 1771—Francis Drake (1696–1771) was an antiquarian and remote relative. The painting is in York Art Gallery.

John Ingamells states that "After [1756] Drake then ‘met with little encouragement and was more successful in miniature’ and a miniature signed ND (now in York Art Gallery) of an unknown man is probably by him".

His topographical subjects, such as The Newport Arch, include groups of figures recalling Canaletto or Samuel Scott. Drake's portraits are only few, but there is a small signed oil of a Sportsman (London, Apsley House, Wellington Mus.). Several of his views, as well as his illustrations to James Thomson's The Seasons, were engraved.

== Family ==
Drake married Martha Carr at St Michael-le-Belfrey. In 1763, they moved into Precentor's Court, which became their family home. It was there that their two sons were born:

- Nathan (1766–1836), a physician and essayist;
- Richard (b. 1767), a surgeon.
