= Nathan Drake (essayist) =

English writer on Shakespeare (1766–1836)

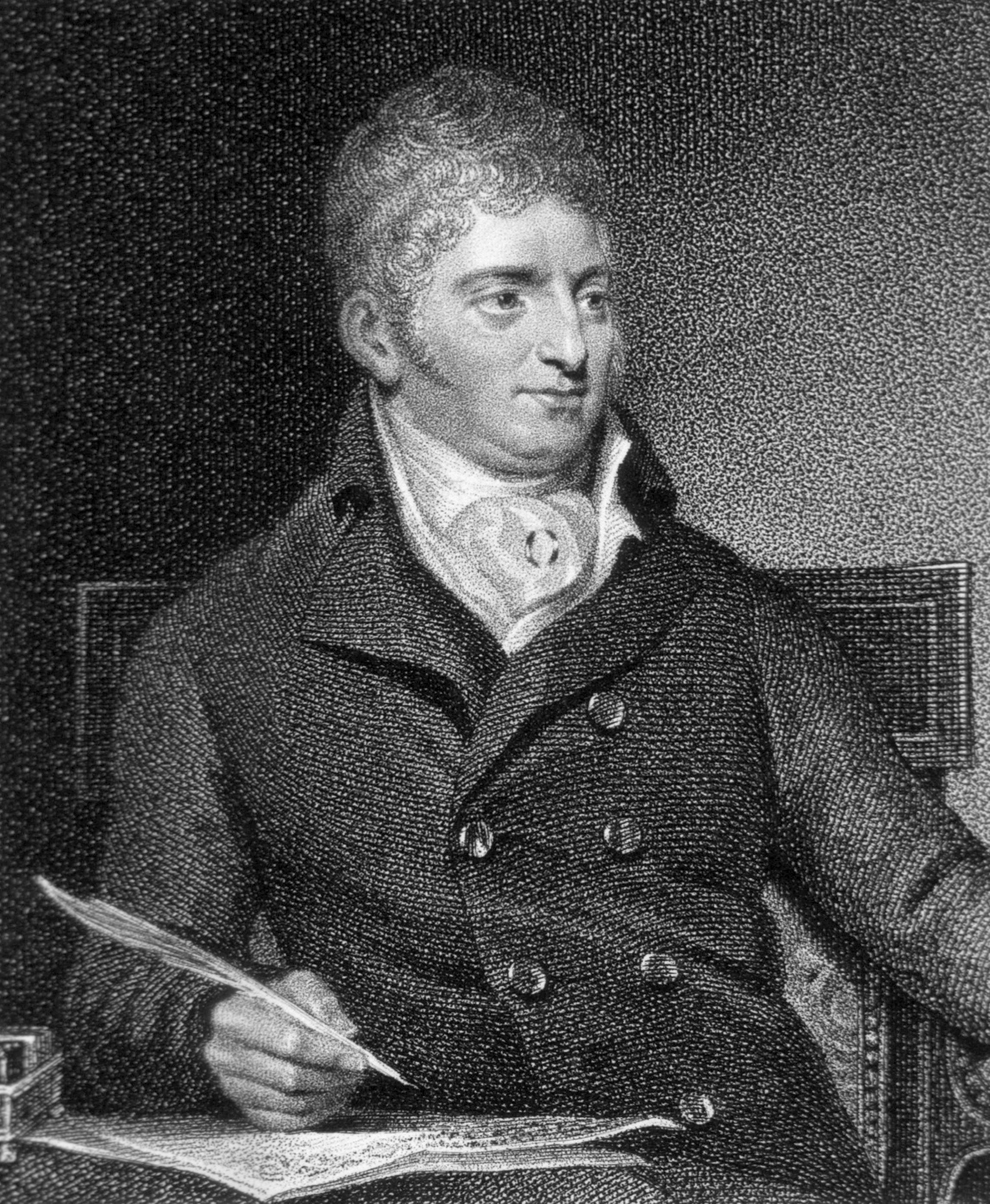
Nathan Drake, engraved after Henry Thomson

Nathan Drake (15 January 1766 – 7 June 1836), English essayist and medical doctor, was born in York, at the family home in Precentor's Court, as the son of Nathan Drake, an artist. He is known for a book summing up knowledge of Shakespeare available at the time.

== Biography ==
Drake was apprenticed to a doctor in York in 1780, and in 1786 proceeded to Edinburgh University, where he took his degree as MD in 1789. In 1790 he set up as a general practitioner at Sudbury, Suffolk, where he became an intimate friend with John Mason Good (died 1827). In 1792, Drake relocated to Hadleigh, where he died in 1836.

== Bibliography ==
Drake's works include several volumes of literary essays and some papers contributed to medical periodicals.

However, Drake's prime work was Shaksperiana: or, Sketches of Shakespeare's character and genius... Now first collected... by Nathan Drake, etc., i. e. Shakespeare and his Times, including the Biography of the Poet, Criticisms on his Genius, and Writings; a new Chronology of his Plays; a Disquisition on the Object of his Sonnets; and a History of the Manners, Customs and Amusements, Superstitions, Poetry and Elegant Literature of his Age, 2 vols, 1817. The titles of its editions give the scope of this ample study, which has the merit, says G. G. Gervinus, "of having brought together for the first time into a whole the tedious and scattered material of the editions and the many other valuable labours of Tyrwhitt, Heath, Ritson, etc." on Shakespeare.

An important medical work of Drake's is On the Use of Digitalis in Consumption (five papers published in the Medical and Physical Journal, London, 1799–1800). His Literary Hours (1798) were highly popular early in the 19th century (4th ed., 1820). Drake is also credited with discovering the merits of the poet Henry Neele.
