= 10 Precentor's Court =

Listed building in York, England

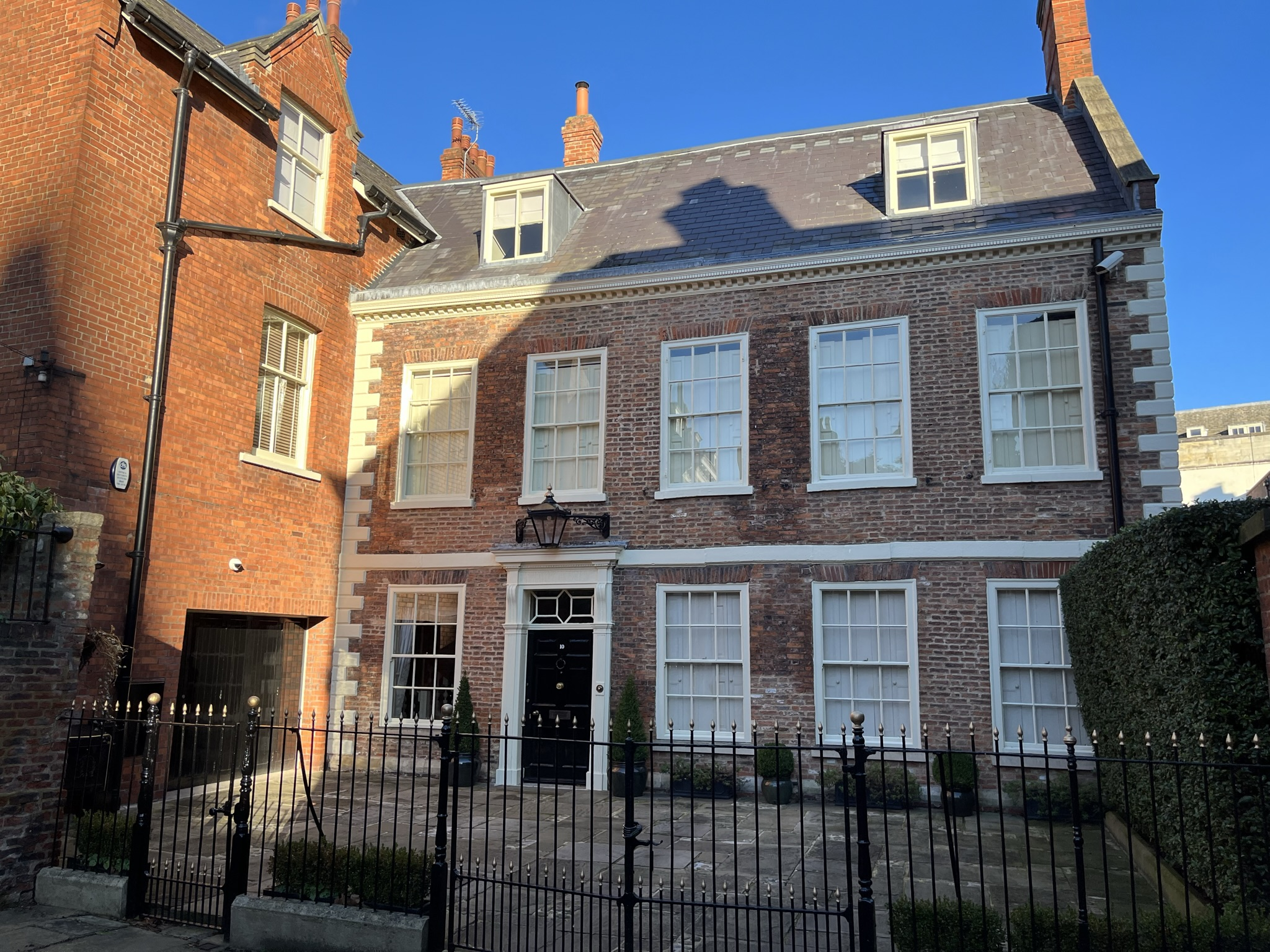
- The building in 2023
- Interactive map of the 10 Precentor's Court area

General information
- Location: Precentor's Court, York, North Yorkshire, England
- Coordinates: 53.9629°N 1.0842°W
- Completed: Early 18th century
- Renovated: c. 1900

Design and construction
- Designations

Listed Building – Grade II*
- Official name: 10, Precentors Court
- Designated: 14 June 1954
- Reference no.: 1256869

10 Precentor's Court is a historic building in the city of York, North Yorkshire, England. It is Grade II* listed, and stands at the western end of Precentor's Court.

Parts of the house date to the 15th century: stone walls on three sides of the building, and in the entrance hall, the arch of a fireplace. The remainder of that house was demolished in the early 18th century, when the present building was constructed, with a new brick facade facing Precentor's Court. The building was altered internally in the mid-19th century, when a bay was added to the rear. In about 1900, the north-west wing of the house was entirely rebuilt, and the roof of the building was raised, adding an attic.

Inside the house, in the ground-floor study, there are 16th-century beams, 17th-century panelling and an 18th-century fireplace. The staircase is early 18th century but has been rebuilt, while the north-east bedroom has an 18th-century fireplace, moved from elsewhere.

The gates and railings in front of the house are Grade II listed.

Reverend George Addleshaw (1906–1982) lived at the property in 1952.

== See also ==
- Grade II* listed buildings in the City of York
- Listed buildings in York (within the city walls, northern part)
