= Minster Court =

Listed buildings in York, England

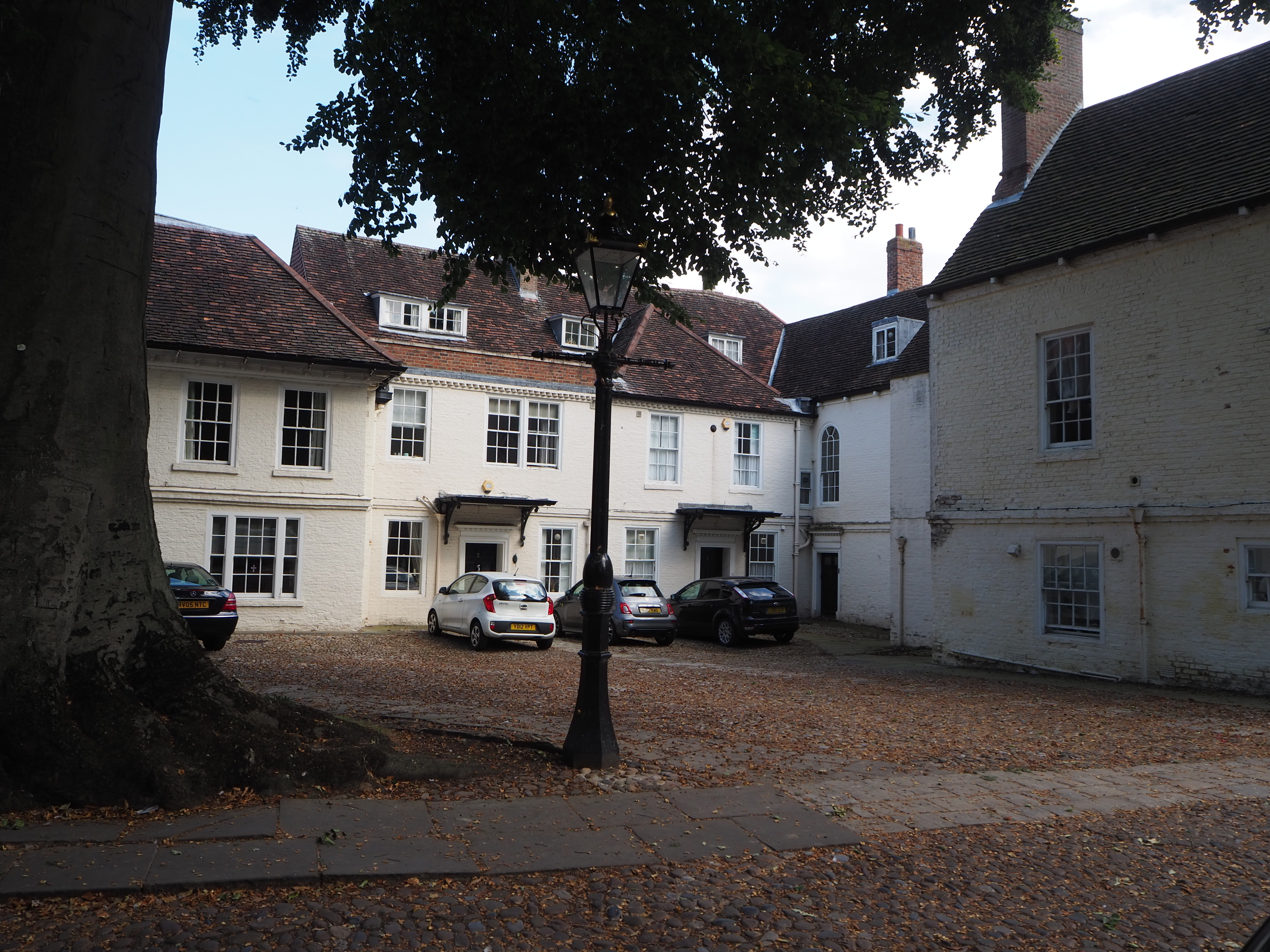
- The north-east range and south-east wing of Minster Court

- Location within York City Centre

General information
- Location: York, England
- Coordinates: 53°57′48″N 1°04′53″W
- Completed: 14th, 15th and 16th centuries
- Renovated: Early 17th and 18th centuries (remodelled); Early 19th and 20th centuries (altered and extended)

Technical details
- Floor count: 2 + attic

Design and construction
- Designations

Listed Building – Grade II*
- Official name: 1, 2, 2A, and 3, Minster Court
- Designated: 14 June 1954
- Reference no.: 1257243

Minster Court is a Grade II* listed group of buildings lying off Minster Yard, in the city centre of York, England.

== History ==
The complex consists of four houses, on three sides of a courtyard: No. 1 in the north-west wing, Nos. 2 and 2A in the north-east range, and No. 3 in the south-east wing. There was formerly a fourth range, almost closing in the courtyard, but that was demolished in the 1820s.

In the 1850s, the building was purchased by Robert Corbet Singleton. More recently, it has been used as housing for people connected with nearby York Minster, including the minster organist and several canons.

== Architecture ==
The north-west and south-east wings have partly medieval stone walls, while the other walls are of 18th-century brick, probably replacing timber framing. The north-east range has three roofs, dating from the 14th, 15th and 16th centuries. The range was altered in the early 17th century, from which period dates one of its ground floor ceilings, but most of the range was further altered over the following 150 years. In the 18th century, the north-west wing was heightened and extended to the south-west.

In the 18th century, a storage building was constructed to the north-east of the complex. In 1850, it was extended to adjoin the complex, and an organ was installed. From 1945, it was converted into a house, numbered 1A, which does not form part of the listed building.

Inside, the north-west wing, there are three rooms with decorated 18th-century fireplaces, plus a large 18th-century kitchen fireplace, a mid-18th-century staircase, and two 18th-century ceilings in first-floor rooms. The north-east range has an early 17th-century ceiling, and many 18th-century fittings. The south-east wing has an 18th-century staircase and rich 19th-century decoration in several rooms, particularly the study. In the attic is some 17th-century panelling.

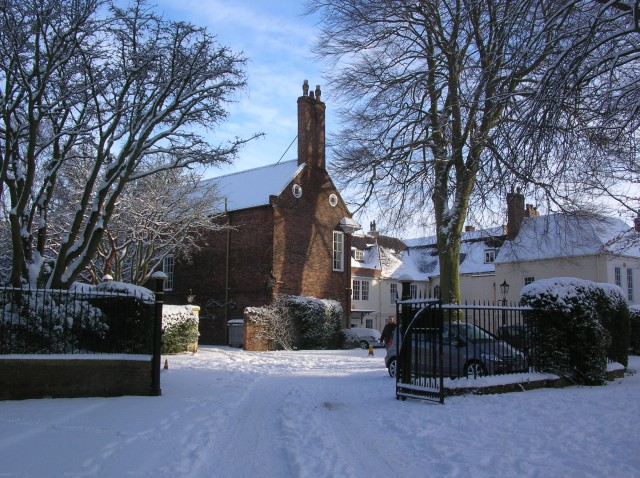
A gate between Dean's Park and Minster Court

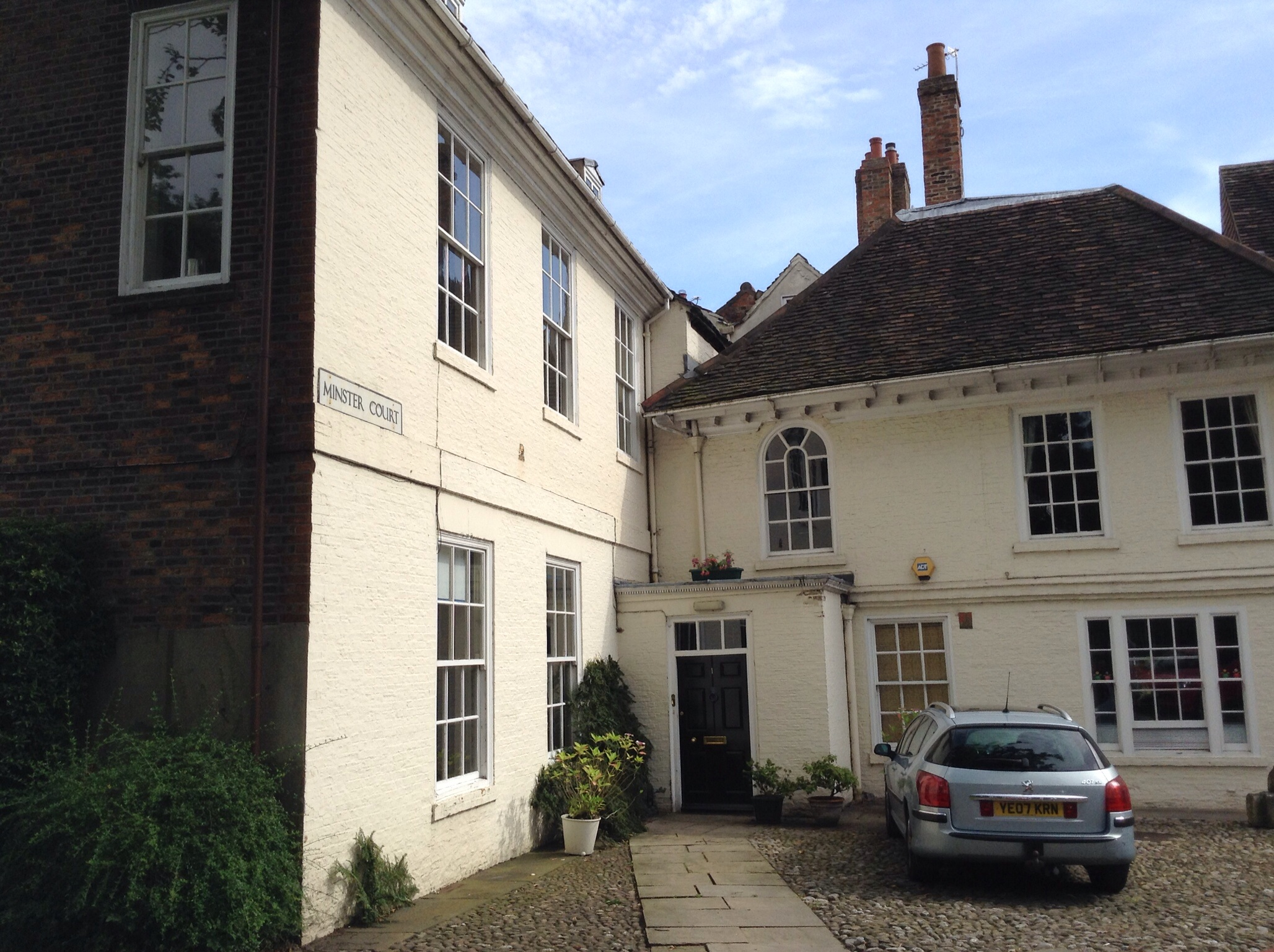
The north-west wing

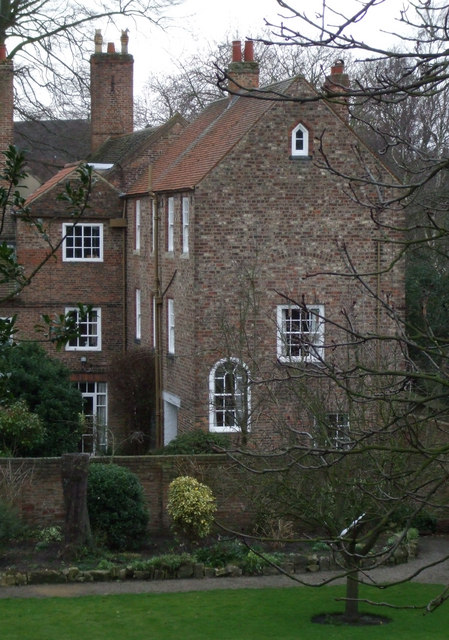
The rear of 1A Minster Court

== See also ==
- Grade II* listed buildings in the City of York
- Listed buildings in York (within the city walls, northern part)
- York Deanery, adjacent to the west
