= 6–7 Precentor's Court =

Listed building in York, England

6 and 7 Precentor's Court
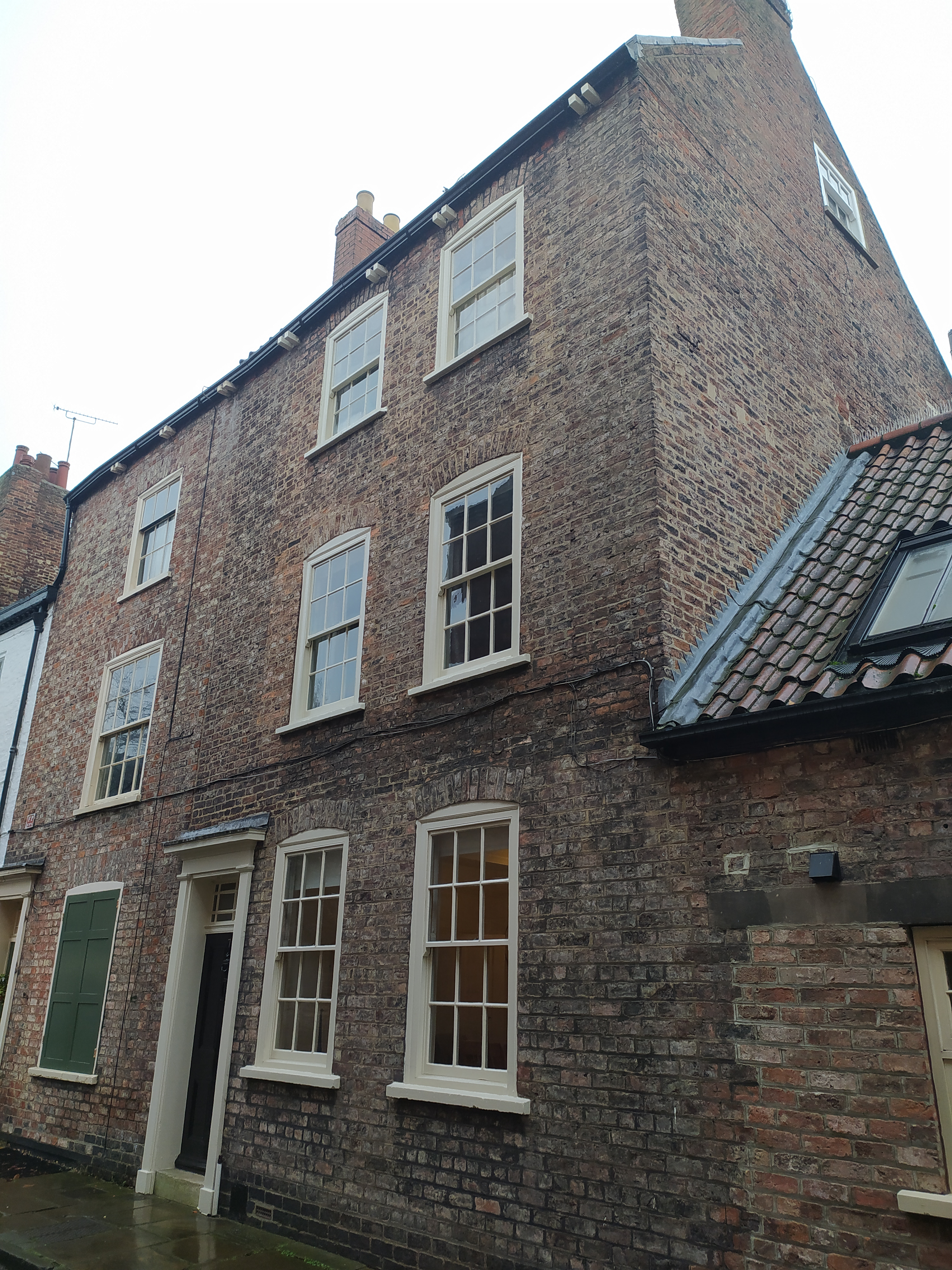
- The building in 2022
- Interactive map of the 6 and 7 Precentor's Court area

General information
- Location: Precentor's Court, York, England
- Coordinates: 53°57′45″N 1°05′03″W
- Completed: Mid-19th century
- Renovated: 20th century (renovated)

Technical details
- Floor count: 3

Design and construction
- Designations

Listed Building – Grade II
- Official name: 6 and 7, Precentors Court
- Designated: 1 July 1968
- Reference no.: 1256866

6–7 Precentor's Court is a historic pair of buildings on Precentor's Court in the city of York, England. Grade II listed, the buildings date to the mid-19th century, with No. 7 having earlier origins. The properties were renovated in the 20th century.

Rachael Epworth, a pawnbroker, formerly lived at the property. Henry Hardcastle purchased the property from her. A. Ayer Carr, a new member of the Yorkshire Philosophical Society, was living at No. 6 in 1900.

== Architecture ==
The building is constructed in orange‑brown brick laid in Flemish bond and orange‑cream brick in both Flemish and English garden wall bonds. The right return is in red‑brown brick laid in stretcher bond. Timber doorcases and paired modillioned guttering are used throughout, and the roof is covered with pantiles and finished with brick stacks.

The front has three storeys and three window bays. Both houses have doorcases formed by pilasters with imposts and plain cornice hoods. No. 6 has a door with six sunk panels, while No. 7 has a four‑panel door; each has an overlight with a bordered design.

No. 6 has 16‑pane sash windows on the ground and first floors, and an unequal nine‑pane sash on the second floor. All have narrow painted sills and cambered brick arches, and the ground‑floor window retains flush panel shutters. No. 7 has two 12‑pane sash windows on each floor, all with narrow painted sills and segmental brick arches.

== In popular culture ==
No. 6 was used as the exterior filming location for the home of the lead character Patience Evans in the television drama Patience.

== See also ==
- Listed buildings in York (within the city walls, northern part)
