= George Addleshaw =

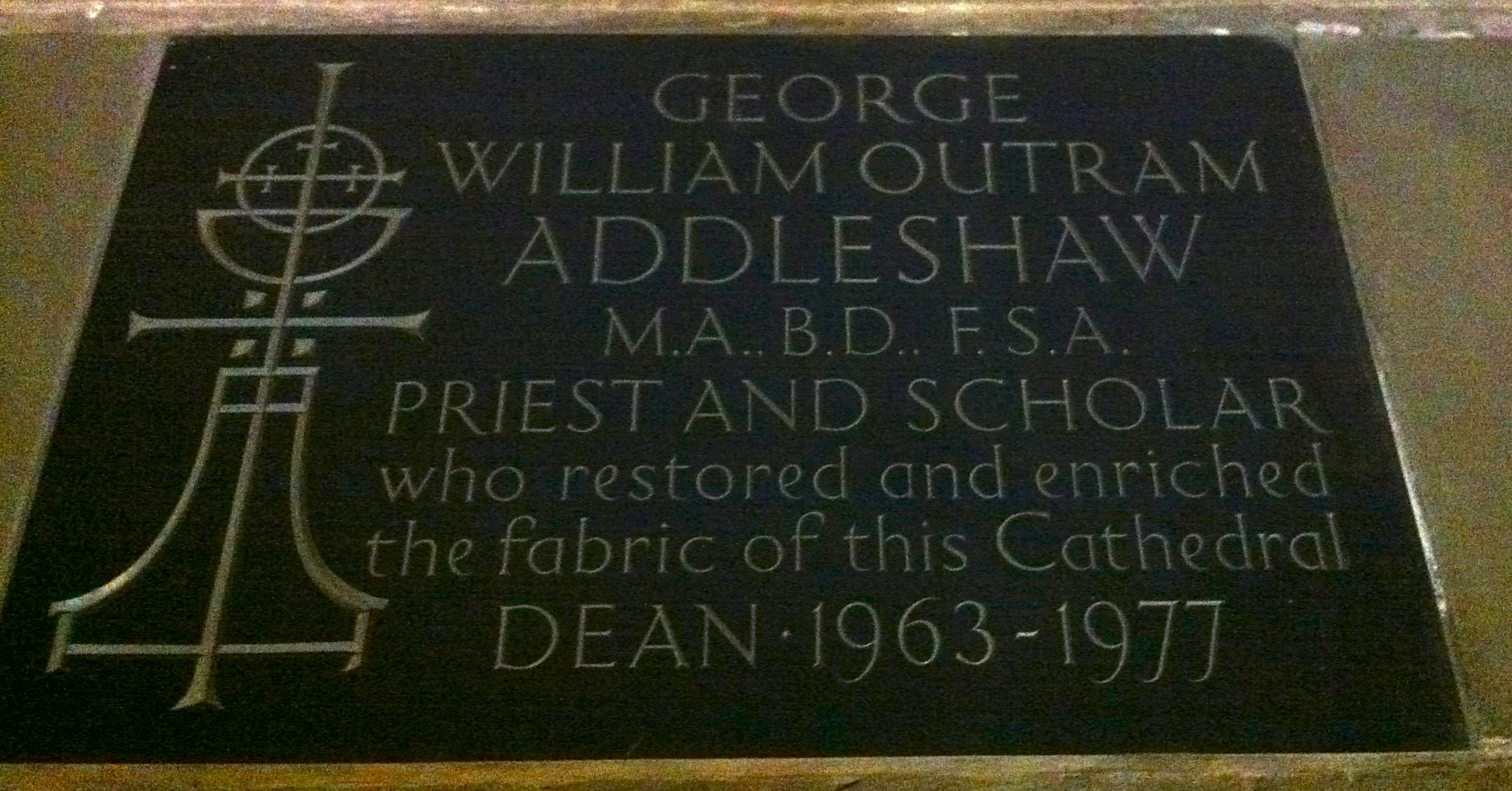
Memorial in Chester Cathedral

George William Outram Addleshaw (1 December 1906 – 14 June 1982) was an Anglican cleric who was Dean of Chester in the third quarter of the 20th century.

He was born in 1906 in Gorefield Vicarage, Wisbech, Cambridgeshire, the son of Canon Stanley Addleshaw. He was educated at Bromsgrove and Trinity College, Oxford. Ordained in 1931, he was initially a Curate at Highfield Parish Church, Southampton. Following this he became Vice Principal of St Chad's College, Durham, then a Canon Residentiary at York Minster before his elevation to the Deanery of Chester. A man with extensive knowledge of church architecture, he died on 14 June 1982.

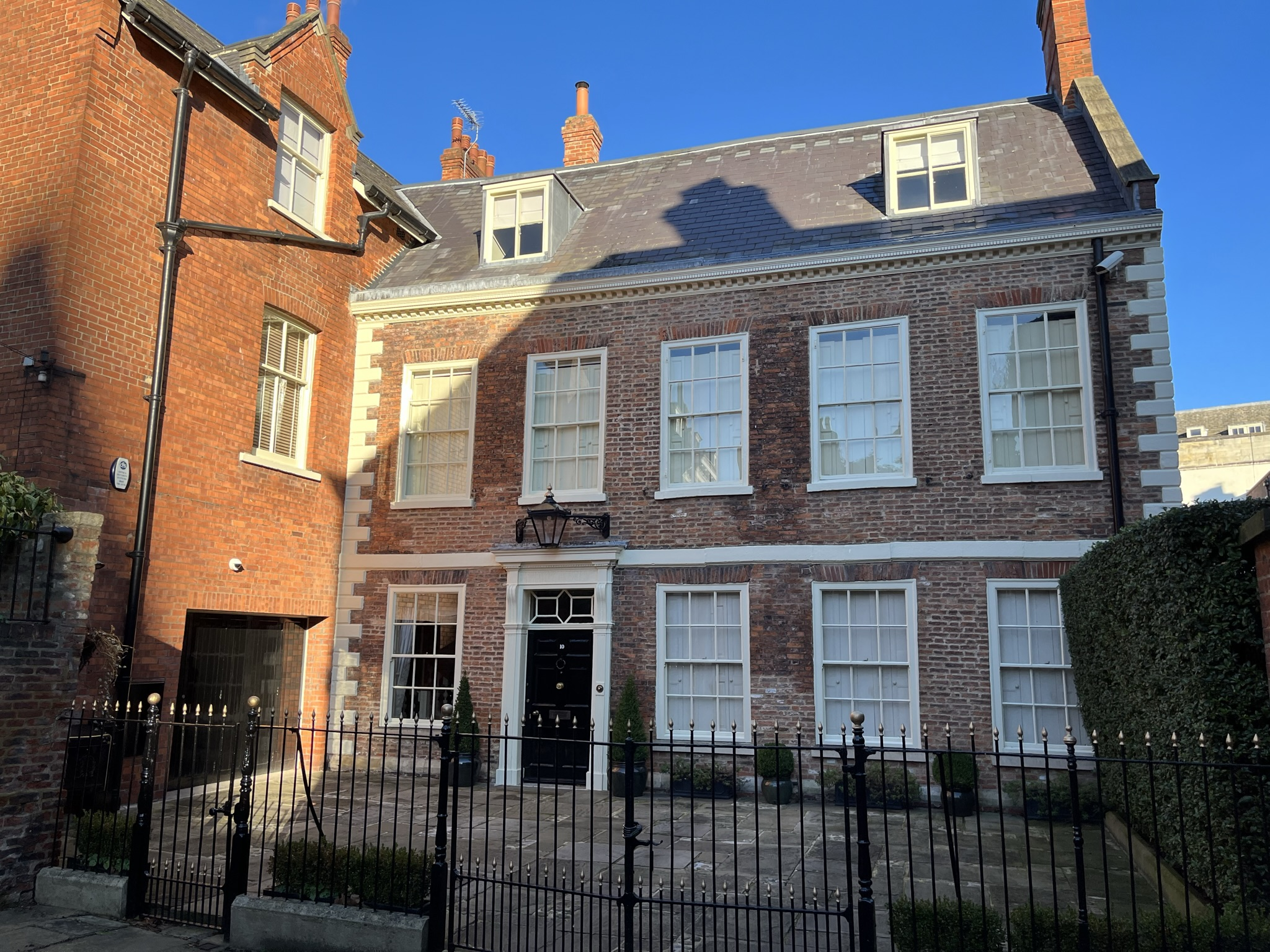
10 Precentor's Court, York, where Addleshaw was living in the 1950s

In the 1950s, Addleshaw was living at 10 Precentor's Court, adjacent to York Minster.

Church of England titles
Preceded by Michael Gibbs	Dean of Chester; 1963–1977	Succeeded by Ingram Cleasby
