= York Minster Stoneyard =

English stone yard

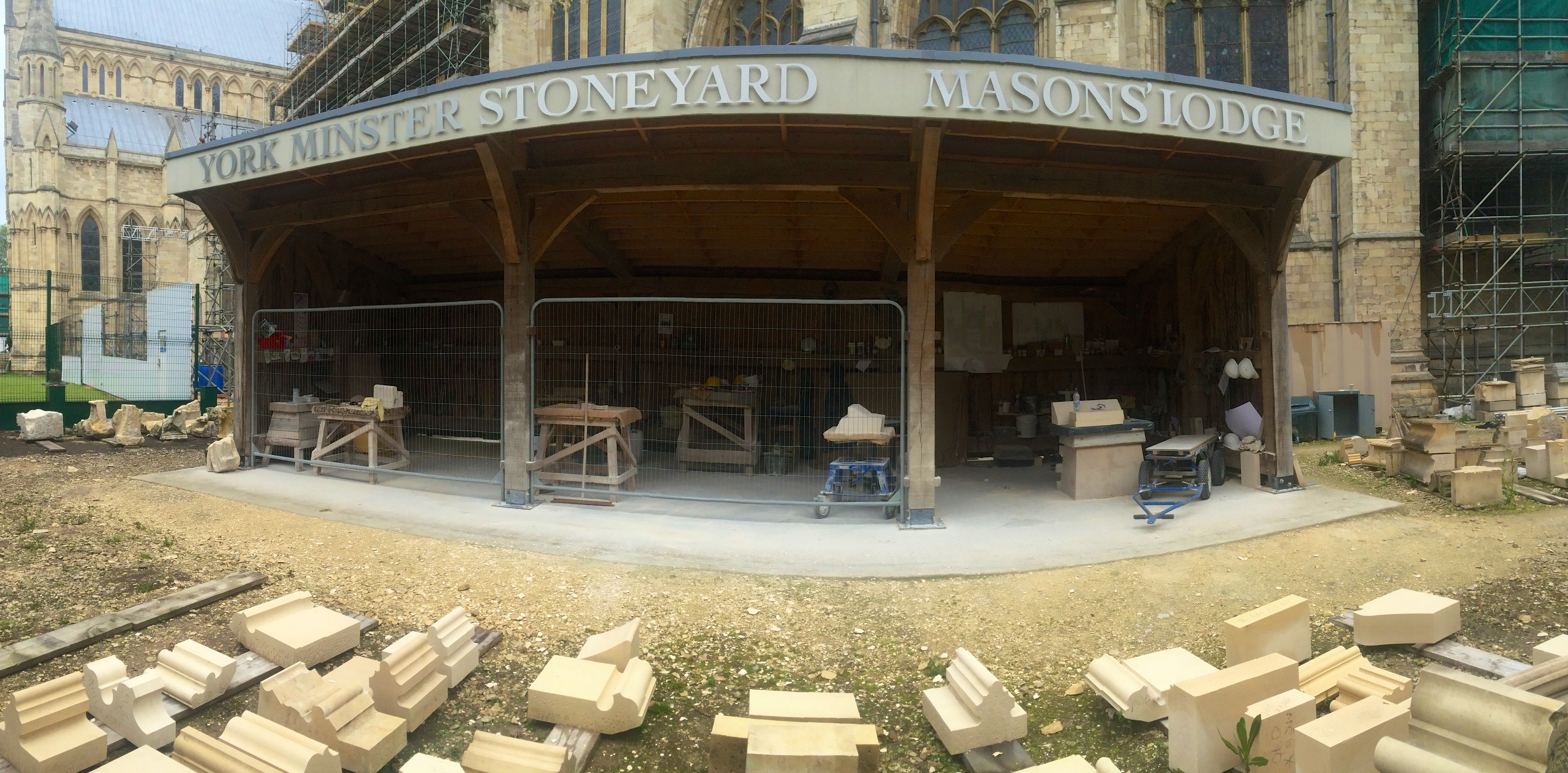
- The stoneyard in 2015
- Interactive map of the York Minster Stoneyard area

General information
- Location: Minster Yard, York, England
- Coordinates: 53.962004°N 1.081054°W
- Construction started: 11th century

York Minster Stoneyard is the stonemasons dedicated to the upkeep of the stonework of York Minster in York, England. Established in the 11th century, around 400 years before the current cathedral was completed, it has been located in Minster Yard, adjacent to the minster's southeastern corner, since 1913. It formerly stood on the site of today's Purey-Cust Lodge, adjacent to Dean's Park, on the minster's northwestern side.

York Minster is one of nine cathedrals in England to possess a permanent masons' workshop. A team of around sixteen stonemasons works at the stoneyard today, ranging from first-year apprentices to the Master Mason. Lead stonemason Lee Godfrey has worked at the minster since 1990.

In addition to York Minster, the masons maintain other buildings under the control of the Dean and Chapter of York.

== History ==
A permanent stoneyard was recommended in the late 18th century by architect John Carr, who had found various parts of the minster in need of repair.

A fire broke out at the stoneyard in 2010, caused by faulty electrical wiring.

Four grotesques dating to the 1700s were removed from the minster in 2019, to be replaced by new carvings.

A statue of Elizabeth II was commissioned at the stoneyard. It was designed using computer-aided design and CNC machines. Charles III and the Queen Consort unveiled the statue in November 2022.

In 2023, the development of a Centre of Excellent for Heritage Craft Skills and Estate Management was announced, including a new masons' workshop. Estimated to cost around £8.5 million, it will be overlooked by York's city walls.
