= Precentor's Court =

Historic street in York, England

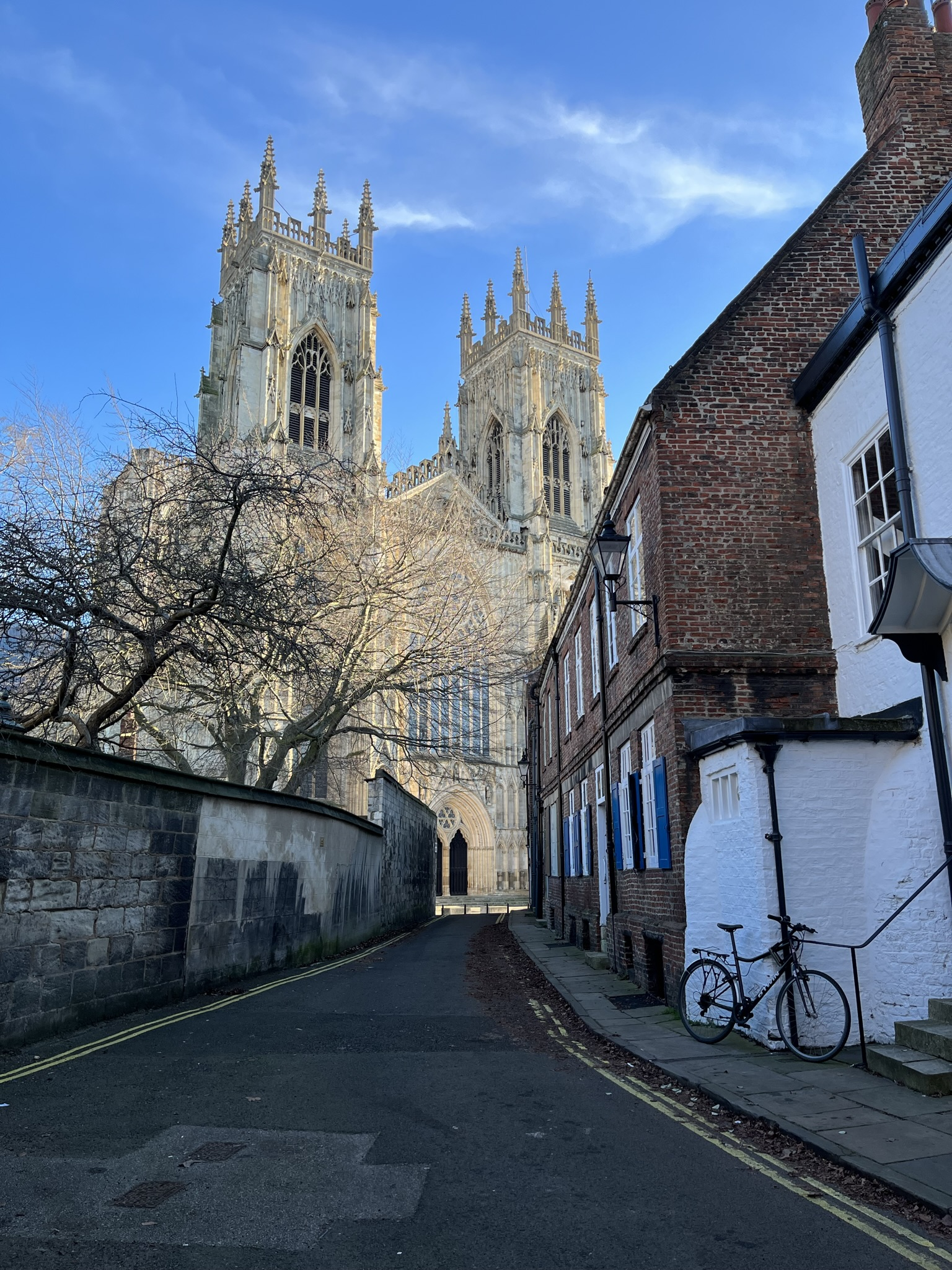
- Looking east down Precentor's Court to York Minster in 2023
- Location within York
- Length: 0.073 mi (0.117 km)
- Location: York, England
- Coordinates: 53°57′44.90″N 1°5′2″W
- South end: High Petergate

Precentor's Court is a historic street in the English city of York. Although certainly in existence by 1313, the street does not appear on a map until 1610, and it is not given a name (Precentor's Lane) until 1722. It was given its current name exactly a century later.

It is a cul-de-sac, running northwest from High Petergate at the western end of York Minster, in front of which the road apexes. A snickelway, known as Little Peculiar Lane, cuts through to the street, at its western end, from High Petergate.

The frontages on High Petergate were developed with commercial properties for letting. A new lane, today's Precentor's Court, was developed, dividing these commercial properties from the canons' residences to the rear.

Around 1540, the marble and stone bases of two shrines in the Minster were dismantled and buried in what is now Precentor's Court. One was later exhumed during construction work and is now preserved in the Yorkshire Museum.

The street was home to St Stephen's orphanage from 1870 to 1872, when it moved to Trinity Lane.

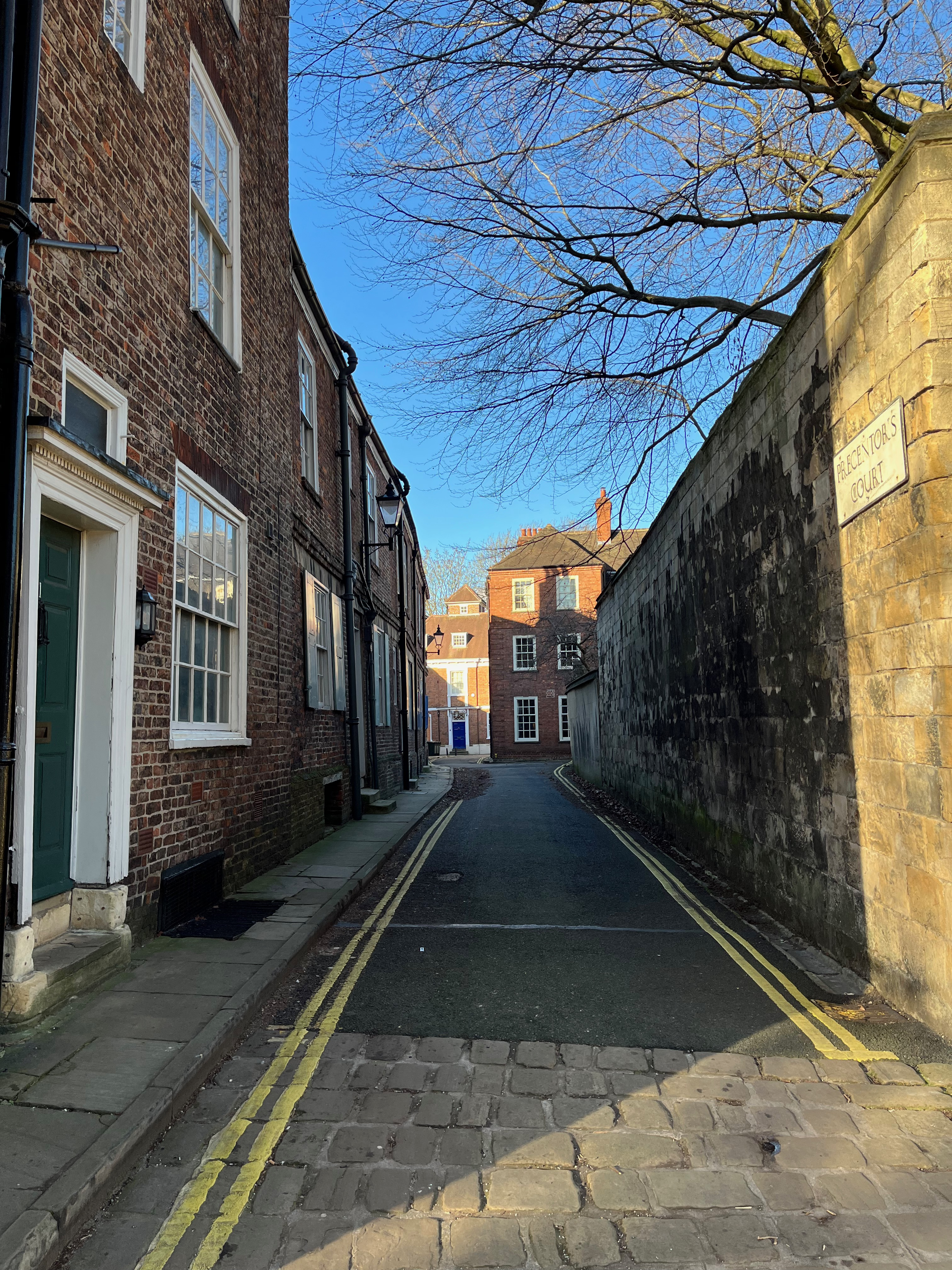
Looking west down the street from in front of No. 1. The southern wall of Purey-Cust Lodge is on the right

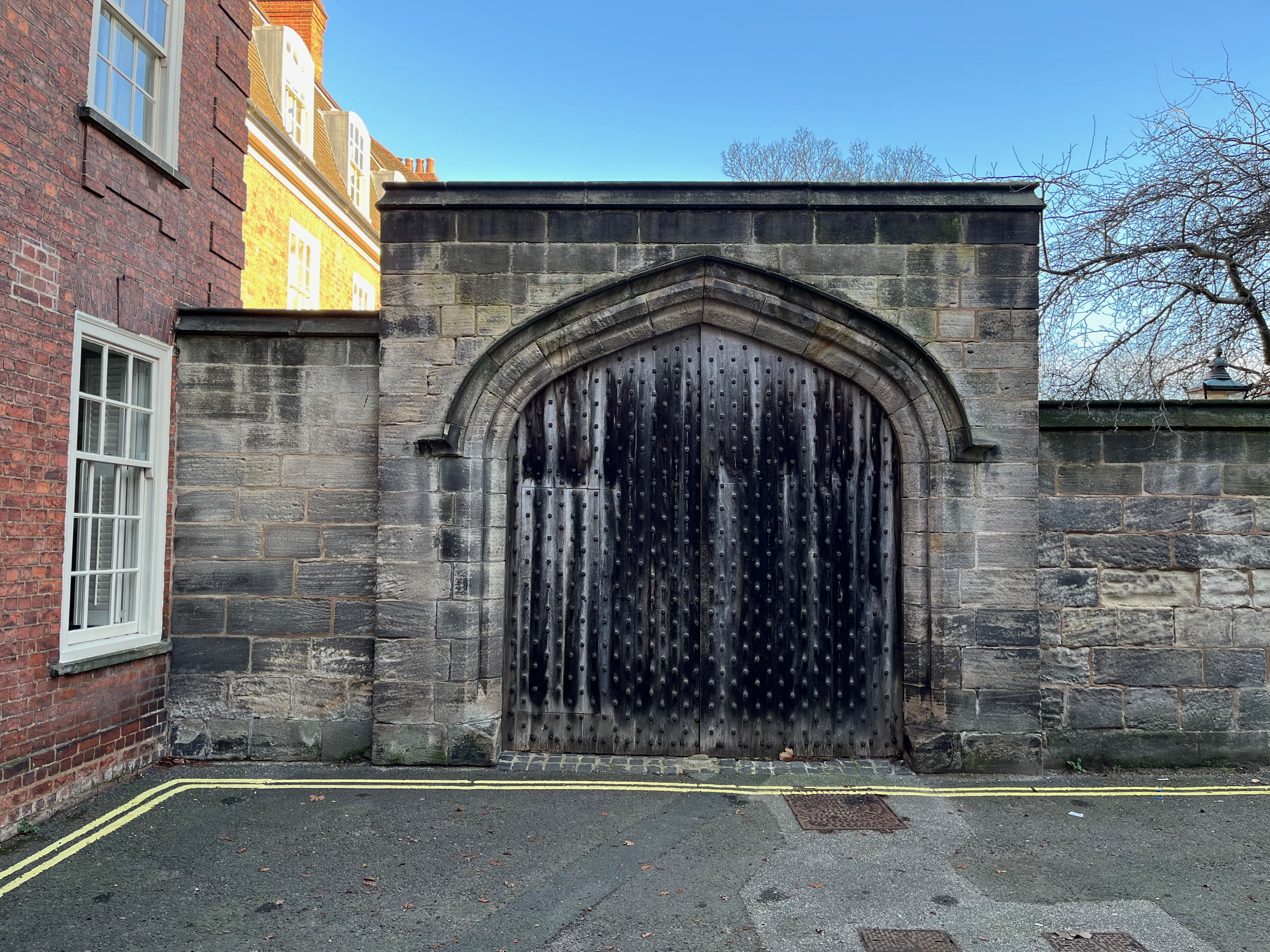
Gate into Purey-Cust Lodge from Precentor's Court

== Notable residents ==
In 1763, artist Nathan Drake married and moved his painting room from Colliergate to Precentor's Court, where he remained for the rest of his life. It was there that his two sons were born: Nathan (1766–1836), a physician and essayist, and Richard (b. 1767), a surgeon.

Peter Gibson, a glazier who worked on all of the Minster's stained-glass windows, lived on the street for almost all of his 87 years. "I live here, and I look out of the window, and there it is, the Minster. It is one of the greatest buildings in the world," he said. "People cross oceans, cross the world, to come and see it."

== Buildings ==
=== Fenton House ===
Formerly the prebendal house of Cave and, later, Fenton, Fenton House, at 9 Precentor's Court, is a Grade II* listed building dating to 1680.

In 2013, the eight-bedroom home was put on the market for £1.1 million.

=== Other notable buildings ===
Below is a selection of notable buildings and structures on Precentor's Court, in addition to Fenton House, ordered from east to west. All are listed buildings in Historic England. Three are Grade II*; two are Grade II. Each building is on the southern side of the street, except Fenton House (which faces the street from its western end) and number 10 (which is around the corner at the same end). The southern wall of Purey-Cust Lodge, a Grade II listed building, occupies the northern section of the western end of the street. A group of buildings on the northern side were demolished in 1913.

- York Arms, 1 Precentor's Court (north side) and 24–36 High Petergate (south) – Grade II; dating to 1838, incorporating an early 18th-century house at each end
- 2, 3, 4 and 4a Precentor's Court – Grade II*; dating to around 1710
- 5 Precentor's Court – Grade II*; early 18th century with later alteration and extension
- 6–7 Precentor's Court – Grade II; mid-19th century, renovated in the 20th century; no. 7 has earlier origins
- 10 Precentor's Court – Grade II*; dating to early 18th century, incorporating remains of a 15th-century house
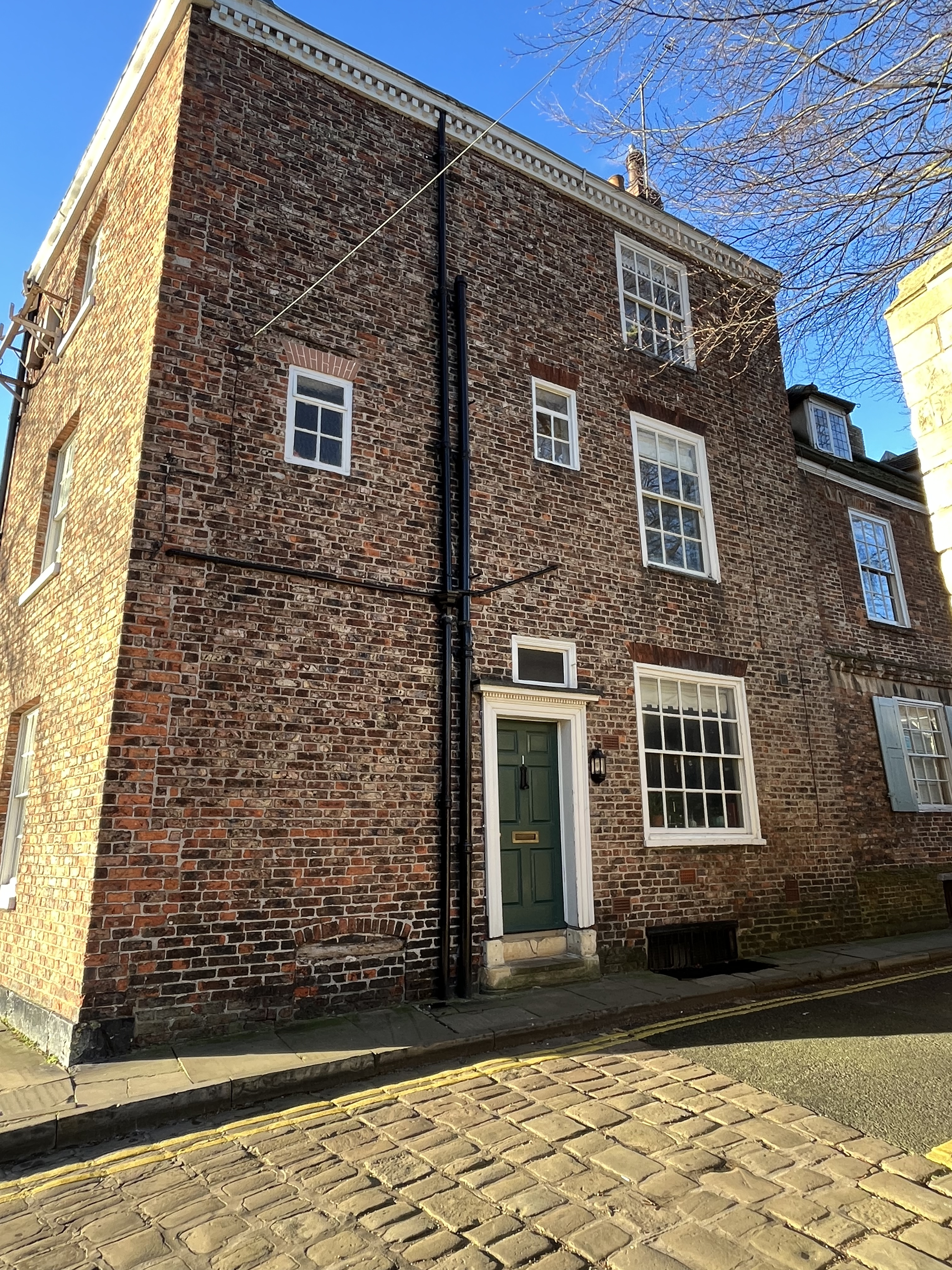
No. 1

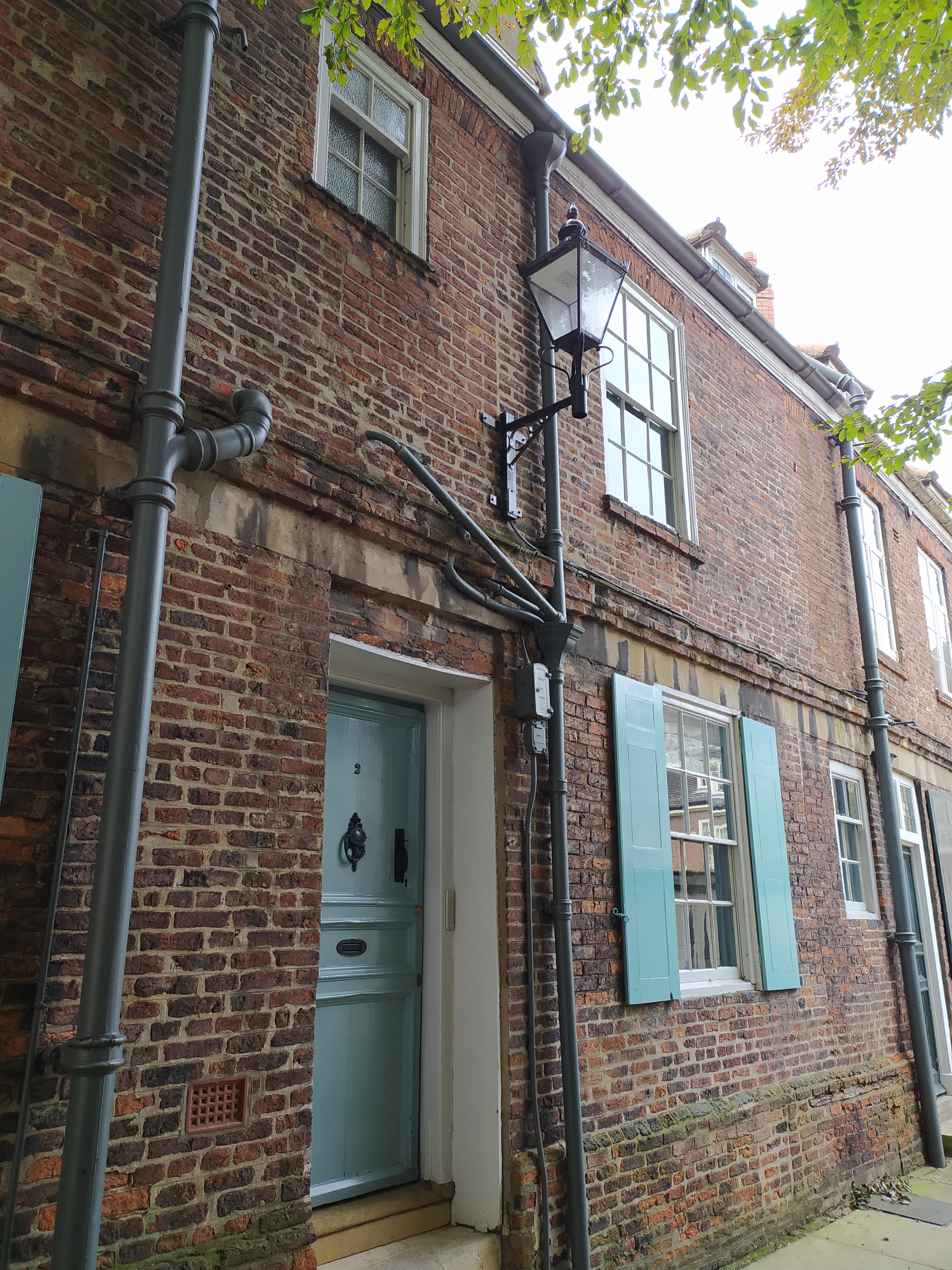
No. 2

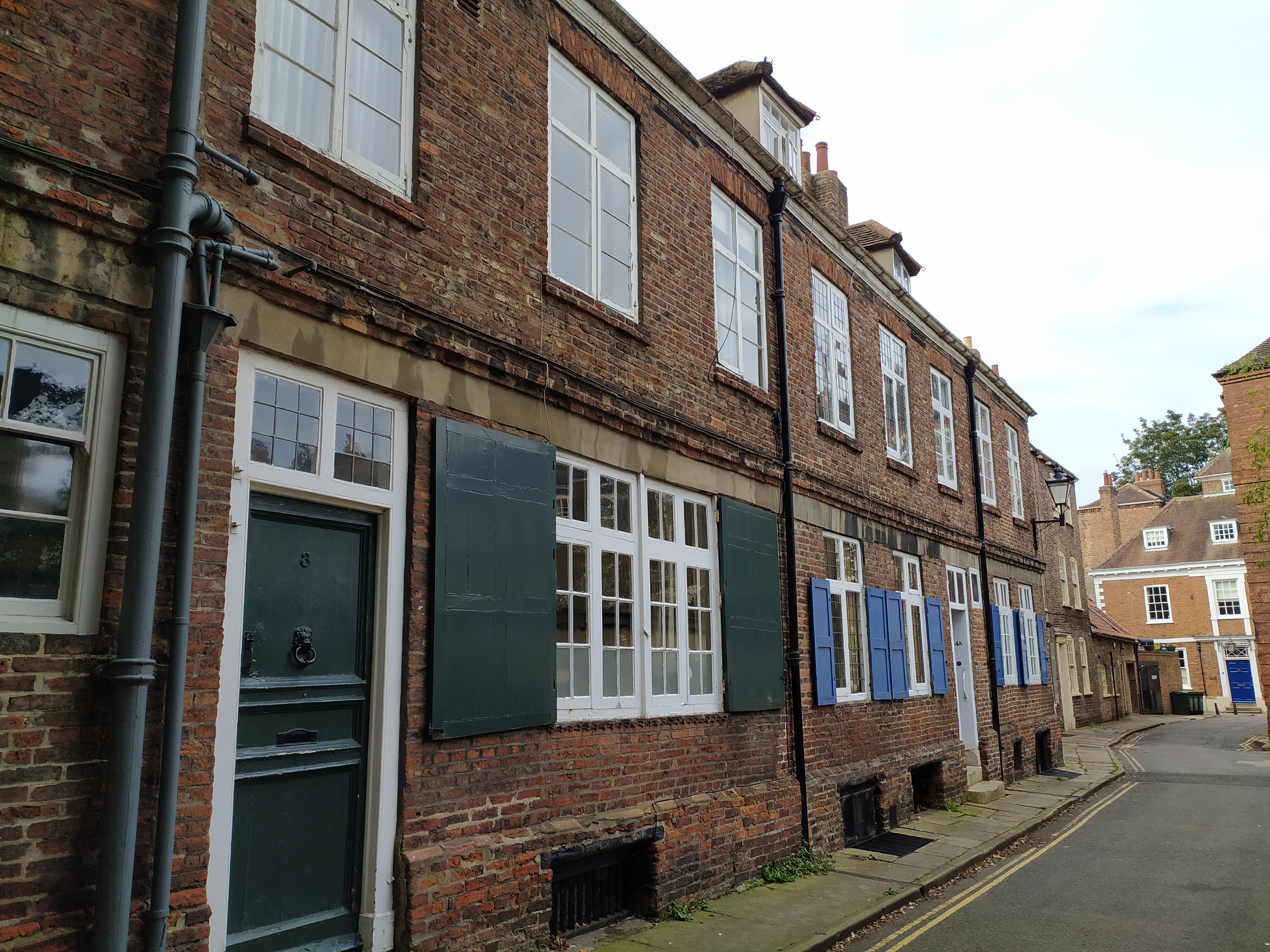
Nos. 3, 4 and 4a

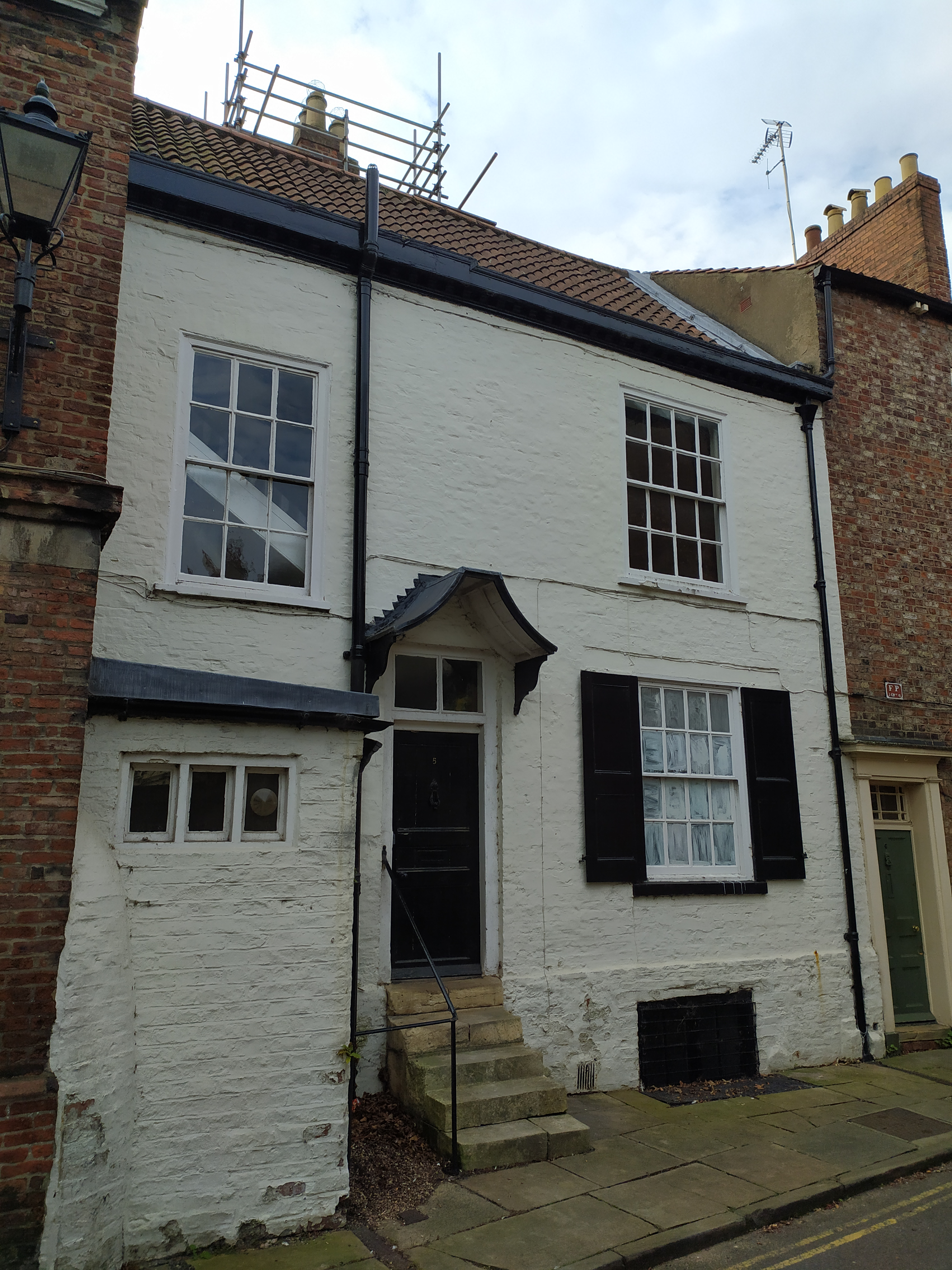
No. 5

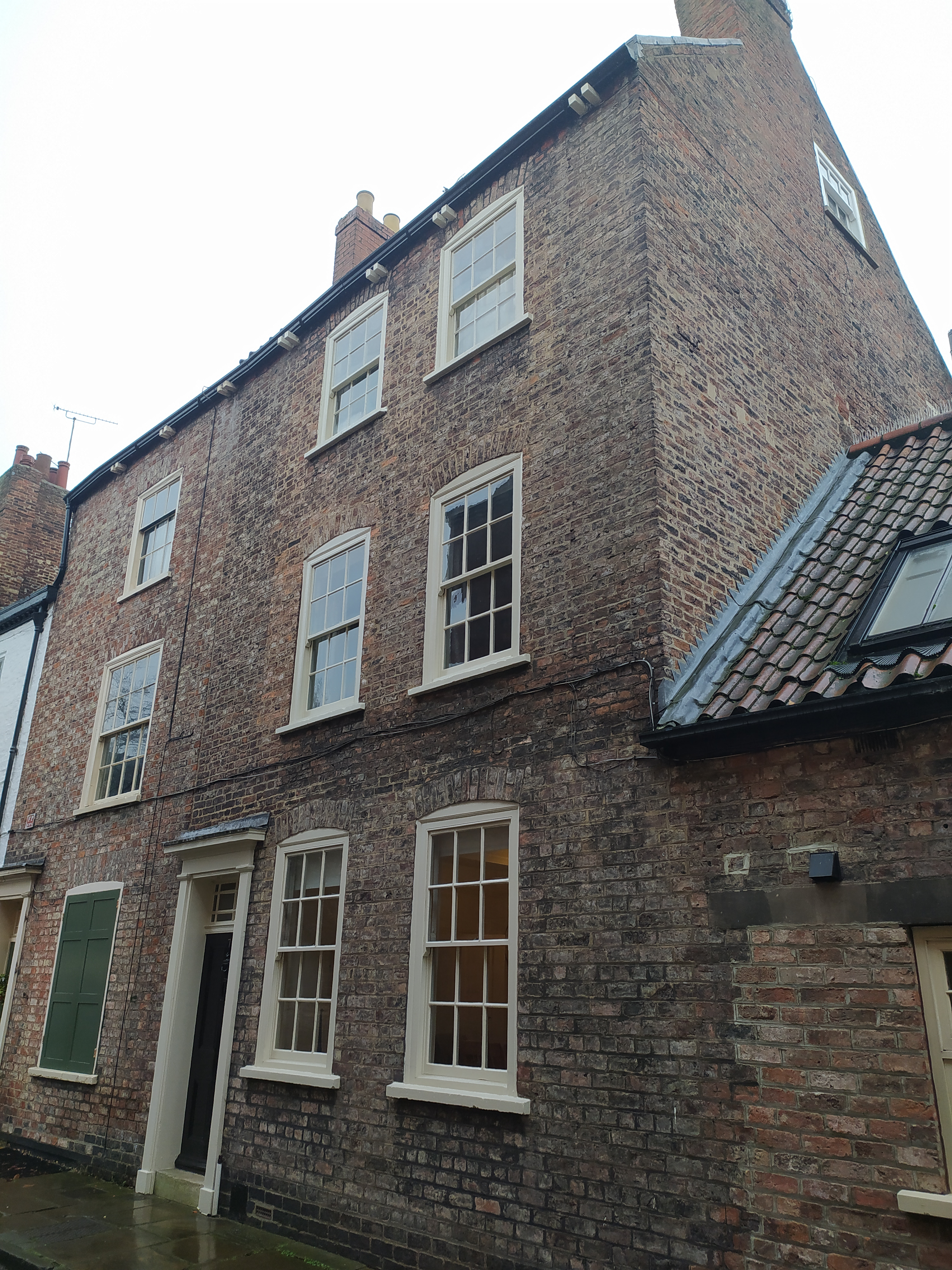
Nos. 6 and 7

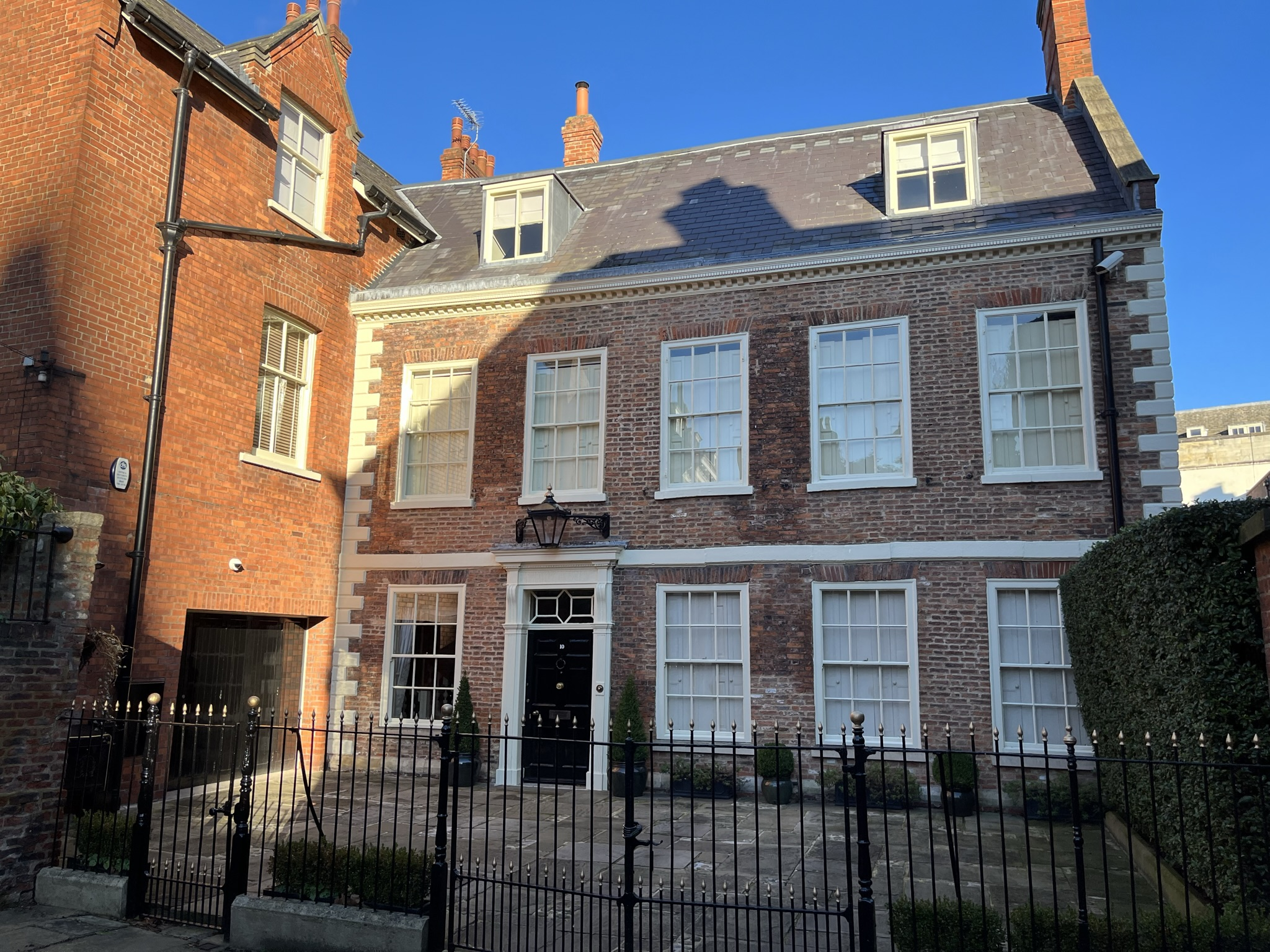
No. 10

== In popular culture ==
Precentor's Court was featured in the final scenes of the finale of the Gentleman Jack television series, a co-production between the BBC and HBO.

== See also ==
- Precentor
- Grade II* listed buildings in the City of York
