= Dean's Park =

Public open space in York, England

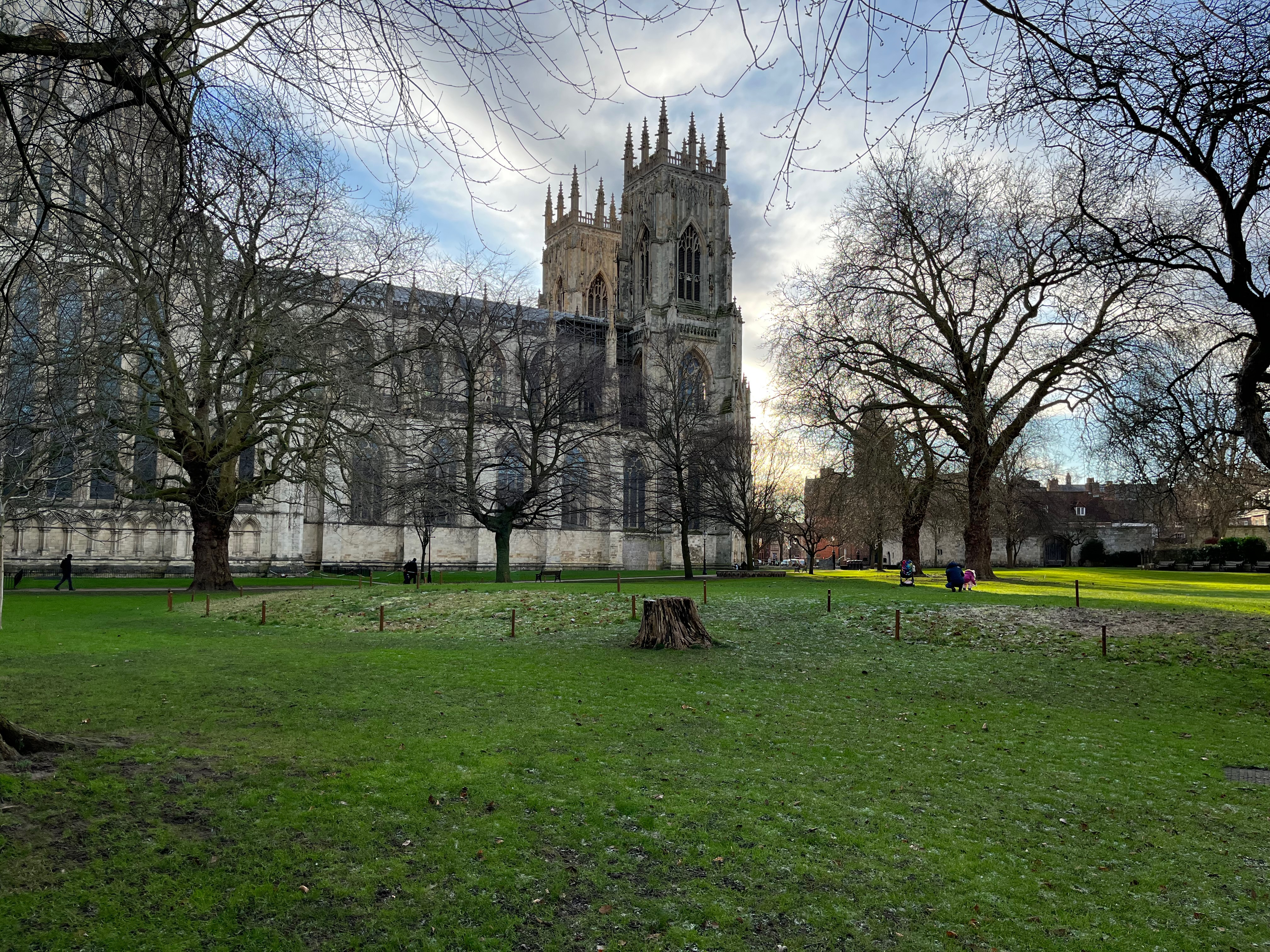
- The park and York Minster in 2023, looking southwest to Minster Yard
- Interactive map of Dean's Park
- Type: Urban park
- Location: York, England
- Coordinates: 53.963010°N 1.0825427°W
- Created: 1823 (203 years ago)
- Owner: Dean and Chapter of York Minster

Dean's Park is an urban park in York, England. It was created in the 19th century.

Formerly the site of the Archbishop's Palace, during the latter part of the Middle Ages, it is located adjacent to York Minster on its northern side. Other structures nearby include Purey-Cust Lodge, in its northwestern corner, York Minster Library and York Deanery to the north, Minster Court to the northeast, and Treasurer's House to the east. York Deanery, the home of the Dean of York, was built in 1939.

The park is accessed by four gates at various points around Minster Yard.

York Minster Stoneyard, which formerly stood on the site of today's park, has now moved to Minster Yard, on the southeastern side of the minster.

During World War II, the park was excavated to house water tanks, but it has since been restored. In 1987, the arcade was rededicated as a war memorial to the dead of the world wars and 19th-century conflicts, and since 1997 it has been grade I listed.

The park is managed by the Dean and Chapter of York Minster.

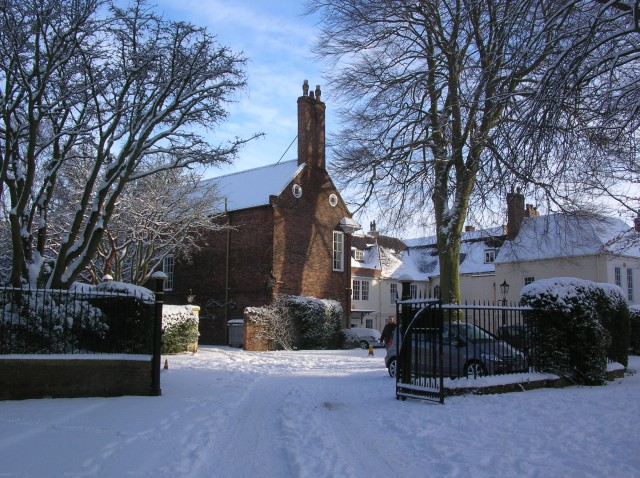
The northern gate to the park, in front of Minster Court
