= 10 Minster Yard =

Listed building in York, England

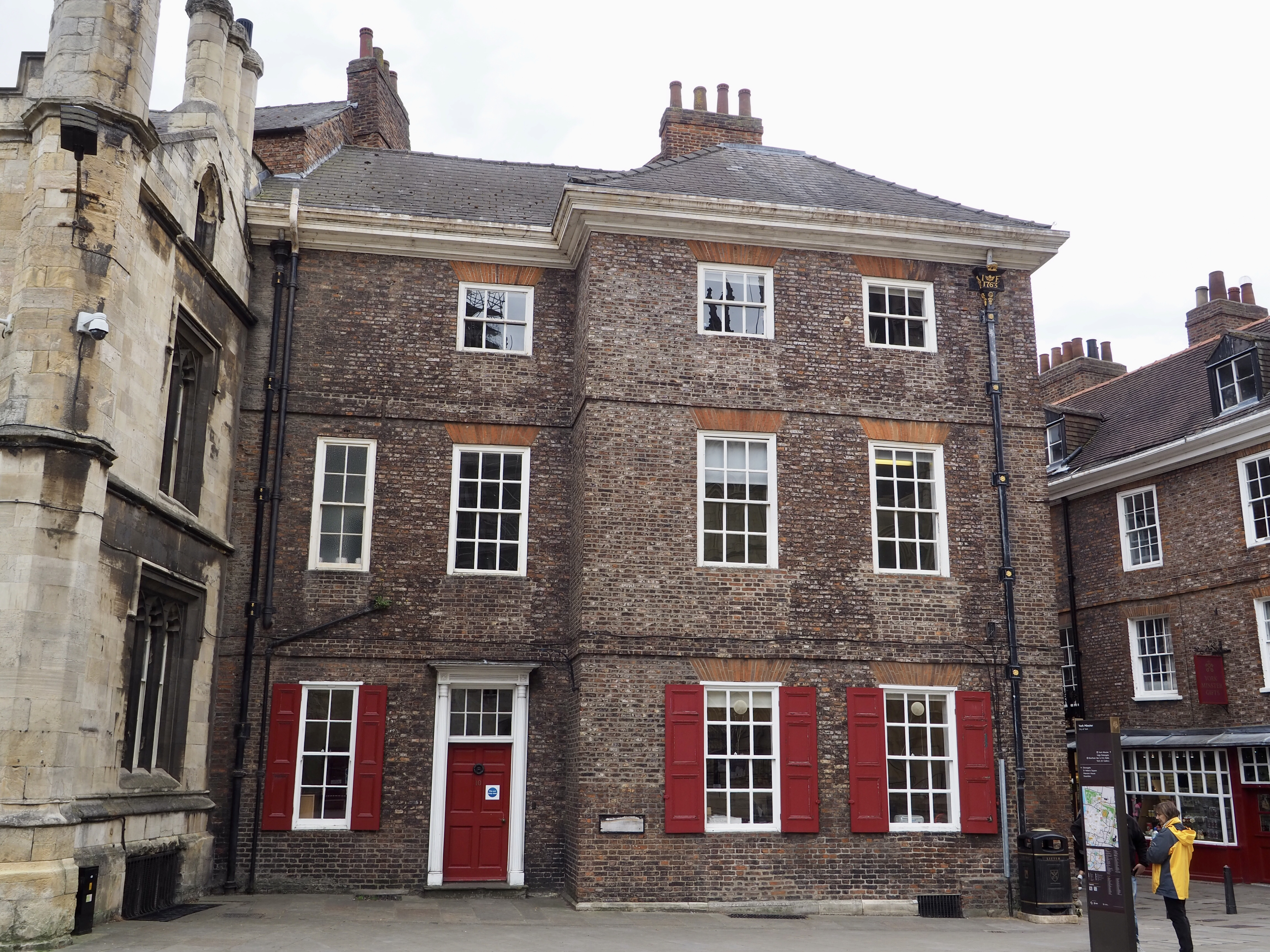
- The building in 2022
- Interactive map of the 10 Minster Yard area

General information
- Location: Minster Yard, York, England
- Coordinates: 53°57′42″N 1°04′55″W
- Year built: c. 1763
- Renovated: Early 19th century (altered and re-roofed)
- Client: John Fountayne

Design and construction
- Designations

Listed Building – Grade II
- Official name: Minster Song School (part)
- Designated: 14 June 1954
- Reference no.: 1257261

10 Minster Yard (officially listed as part of Minster Song School) is a historic building at the corner of Minster Yard and Minster Gates in the city of York, England. A Grade II listed building, it dates to around 1763. It formed part of the now-closed Minster School and was built as the home of John Fountayne, the dean of York. Behind it stands 10 Minster Gates, built around 1755 for Fountayne and leased to William Darwin, the verger.

It is almost a century older than the other buildings to its rear, Nos. 2–8 Minster Gates, which do not follow the same alignments as 10 Minster Yard and 10 Minster Gates.

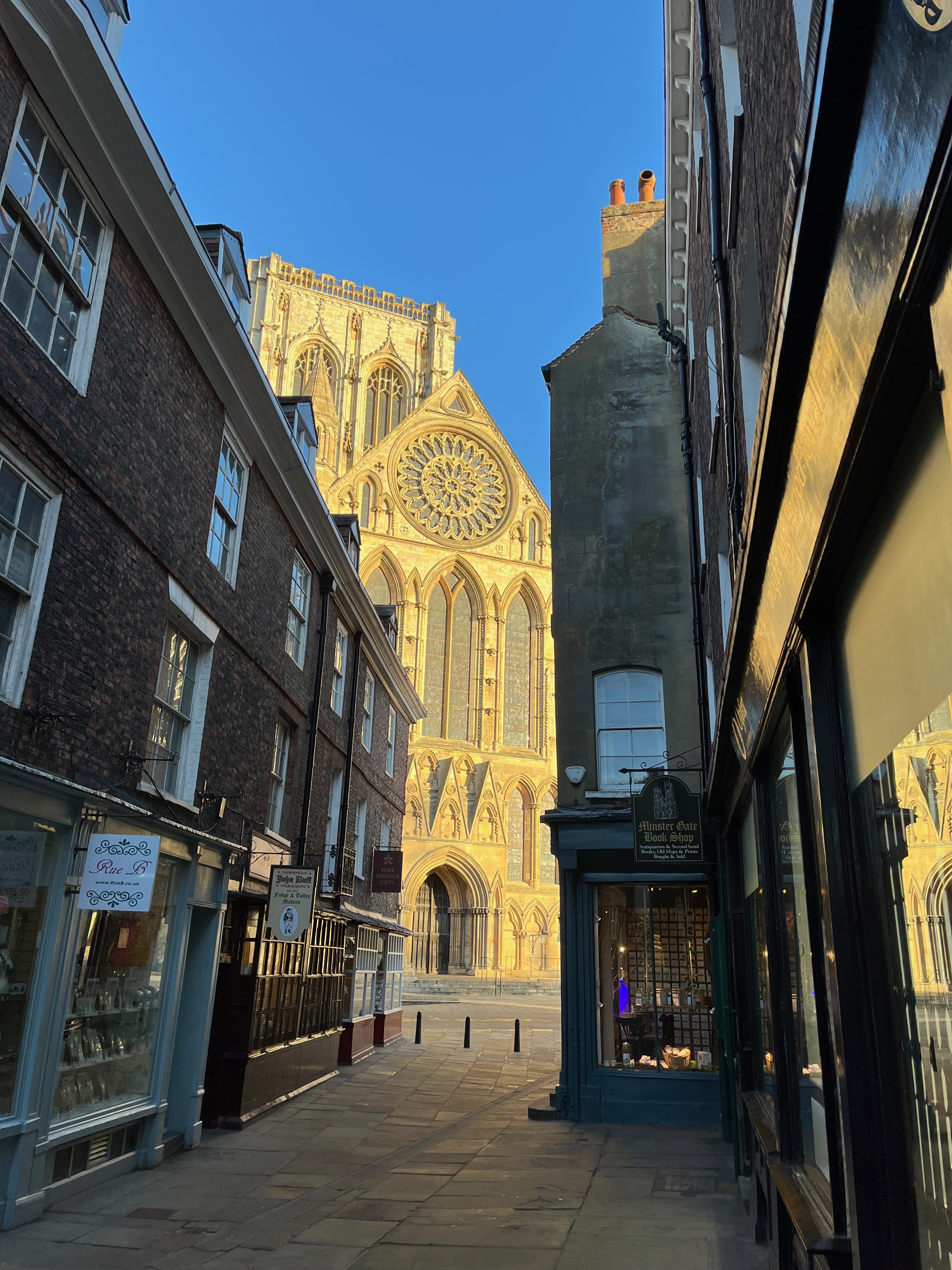
This view shows how the later buildings on the east side of Minster Gates sit out of line with 10 Minster Yard at the end

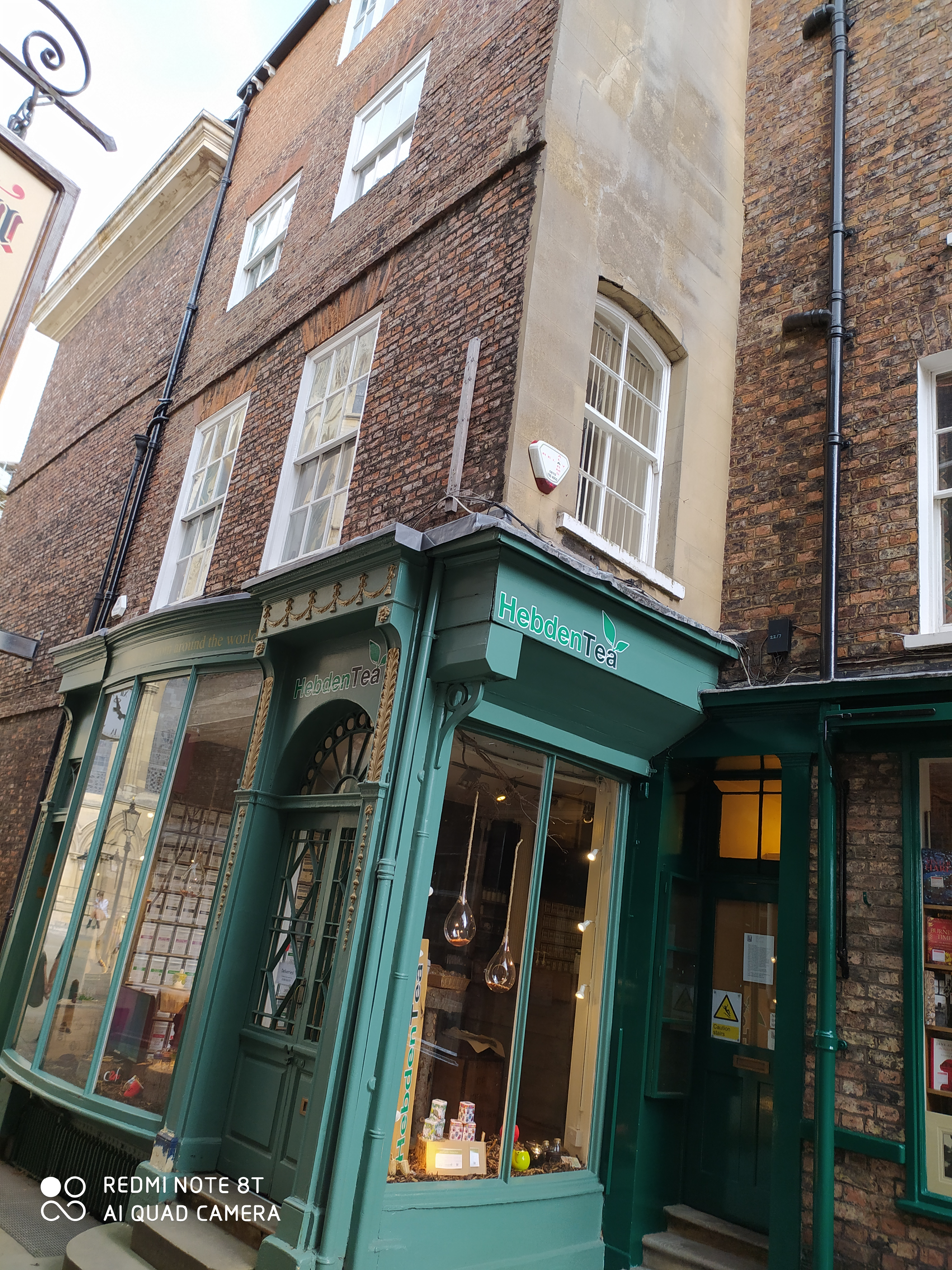
10 Minster Gates, to the rear of 10 Minster Yard

== See also ==
- Listed buildings in York (within the city walls, northern part)
