= St James' Church, High Melton =

Anglican church in High Melton, South Yorkshire, England

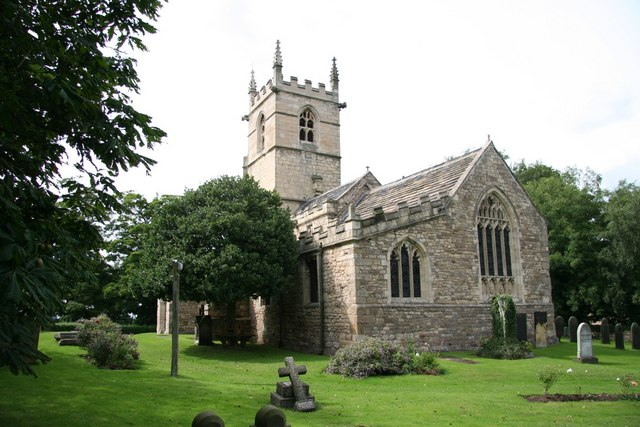
- St James' Church, High Melton
- St James' Church, High Melton
- 53.5105°N 1.2338°W
- OS grid reference: SE 50917 01811
- Denomination: Church of England
- Churchmanship: Broad Church
- Website: www.barnburghandharlington.co.uk

History
- Dedication: St. James

Administration
- Province: York
- Diocese: Sheffield
- Archdeaconry: Doncaster
- Parish: High Melton

Clergy
- Priest: Interregnum

St James' Church, High Melton is a parish church of the Church of England in High Melton, South Yorkshire, England.

== Background ==
The Church of St James dominates the village of High Melton, near Doncaster, in South Yorkshire. The church has Saxon origins but the main part of the existing building was established about 1100 AD and handed over to Avice de Tania in 1153 AD to be put under the care of the Cistercian nuns at Hampole. It was originally intended as a Chapel of Ease to the Priory at Hampole, which had been founded a few years earlier by Avice de Tania with her husband, William (de) Clairfait, whose gift and that of the churches of Adwick and Melton were later confirmed by Archbishop Roger of York.

Until at least the reign of Richard II (1377–1400), the church was known as the "Church of All Hallows" and served by nuns from the Hampole Priory, along with Chaplains appointed by them. About this time, a tower was added and a Lady Chapel to the south-east. As a result, the ground plan is rather unusual, having two aisles – one through a short nave within the chancel and the western tower, and also a continuous south aisle to the whole length of the church leading to the Lady Chapel.

Before the Reformation there was no ecclesiastical parish of High Melton (then known as Melton-super-Montem or Melton-on-the-Hill), remaining under the spiritual direction of the Priory at Hampole, which appointed a Curate and claimed the income from the lands. No Vicar was appointed until following the Civil War, when John Norobolt was installed as first Vicar of Melton-on-the-Hill in 1660 following the Restoration.

== Benefactors ==
It has had several generous benefactors over the years, including the Fountayne family and its descendants, the Wilson family, which changed its name to Montagu following an inheritance. There are substantial memorials to members of these families in the church. Several members of the Fountayne family are interred beneath the chancel whilst the Carrara marble graves of the Montagues are located in the northern section of the churchyard.

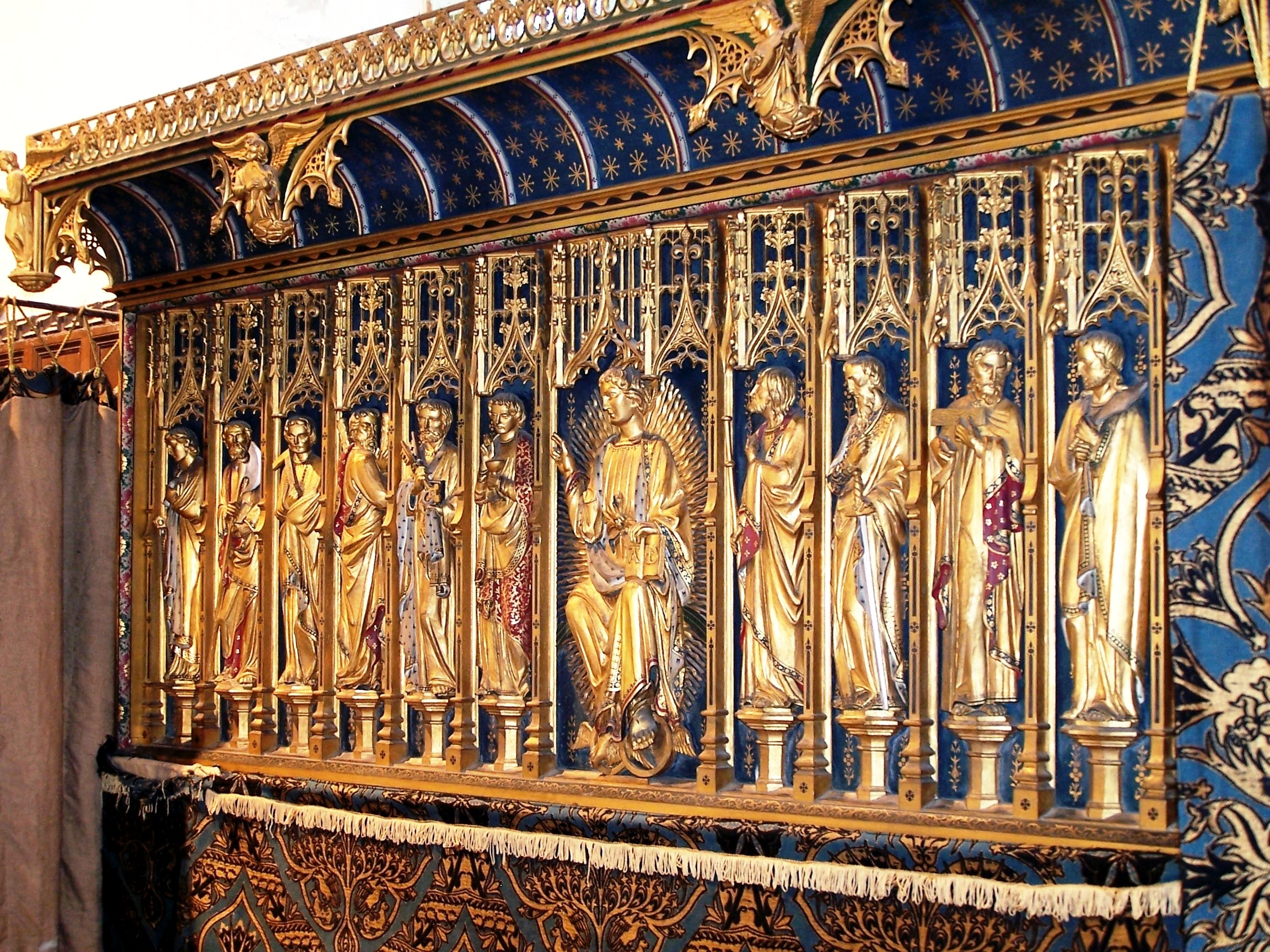
The gilded Comper reredos

Another local family which were connected to the church were the Levetts of High Melton, who settled there after leaving nearby Normanton, where they had been prominent since the 13th century. John Levett of High Melton had married Mary, the daughter of Emmanuel Mote, who owned the manor of High Melton, having inherited it from his wife's family, the Copleys. The coat of arms of the Levetts of High Melton and Normanton appear, like those of several prominent local families, in a stained glass window of St James' Church.

Benefactors helped to improve the state of the church in the early 20th century. In particular, there is a spectacular rood screen bearing a crucifixion set of figures (1905), a reredos and altar frontals (1907) which are the work of Sir John Ninian Comper, who also did much work for York Minster. The rood screen hides a notable chancel arch, which is thought to be one of the earliest specimens of Norman work in the district.

== Stained glass windows ==
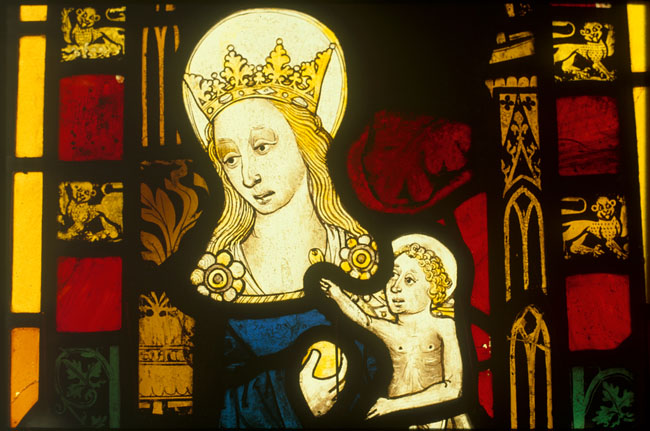
Virgin & Child window, c.1325, relocated from York Minster to St James' Church by Dr Fountayne

St James' is also known for its beautiful windows, one of which is also from the Comper Studio. John Fountayne, DD, Dean of York, installed several pieces of mediaeval stained glass obtained from throughout the county, most notably a window depicting William de Melton, the 43rd Archbishop of York (1317–1340) and fragments of a 'doom scene' from the Jesse Tree window of York Minster.

Fountayne, who was Lord of the manor of High Melton from 1739–1802, also introduced several examples of painted glass by Peckitt and stained glass from the influential 14th-century pioneer Thomas Glazier, giving the church a rich inheritance. Some of the stained glass, including the heraldic panels, were moved from the Great Chamber of the Old Hall when Very Rev. Dr. Fountayne renovated it in the mid-18th century. The two East Windows are examples of work by Kempe.

== Parish registers ==
The Parish Registers of High Melton begin in 1538 (this is unusual as in many other parishes the registers only date back to the beginning of the reign of Elizabeth I, 1558).

== Organ ==
The church has a two manual, tracker action pipe organ by Forster and Andrews dating from 1898. A specification of the organ can be found on the National Pipe Organ Register.

== Tower, bells and clock ==
The tower is constructed in three stages being mainly in perpendicular style, the lower part in the 14th century, with 15th- and 17th-century additional stages. The second stage of the tower, which is the ringing chamber, has a large stone fireplace on its east side and is locally reputed to have housed curates prior to the Restoration. The tower houses three bells, currently unringable. The tenor bell weighs 7cwt, sounds B♭ and was cast in 1636 in Doncaster by William Oldfield of Nottingham (who had branches in York and Doncaster). It bears the inscription "Soli Deo gloria", one of the five solas propounded to summarise the Reformers' basic beliefs during the Protestant Reformation. The second bell sounds C and is the oldest, being a pre-Reformation cast, between 1500 and 1510, by the Seliok family and dedicated Sancti Antonii. The treble bell sounds D and was cast c. 1590 by Henry Dand of Nottingham.

The clock, with its unusual stone face, was constructed in 1788 and has been inactive for many years.

== Current use ==
It is part of the Diocese of Sheffield, now under the joint Benefice of St Peter, Barnburgh, and St James, Melton-on-the-Hill, with St John the Baptist, Adwick upon Dearne.

== See also ==
- Grade II* listed buildings in South Yorkshire
- Listed buildings in High Melton
