= The Minster School, York =

Former school in York, England

The Minster School
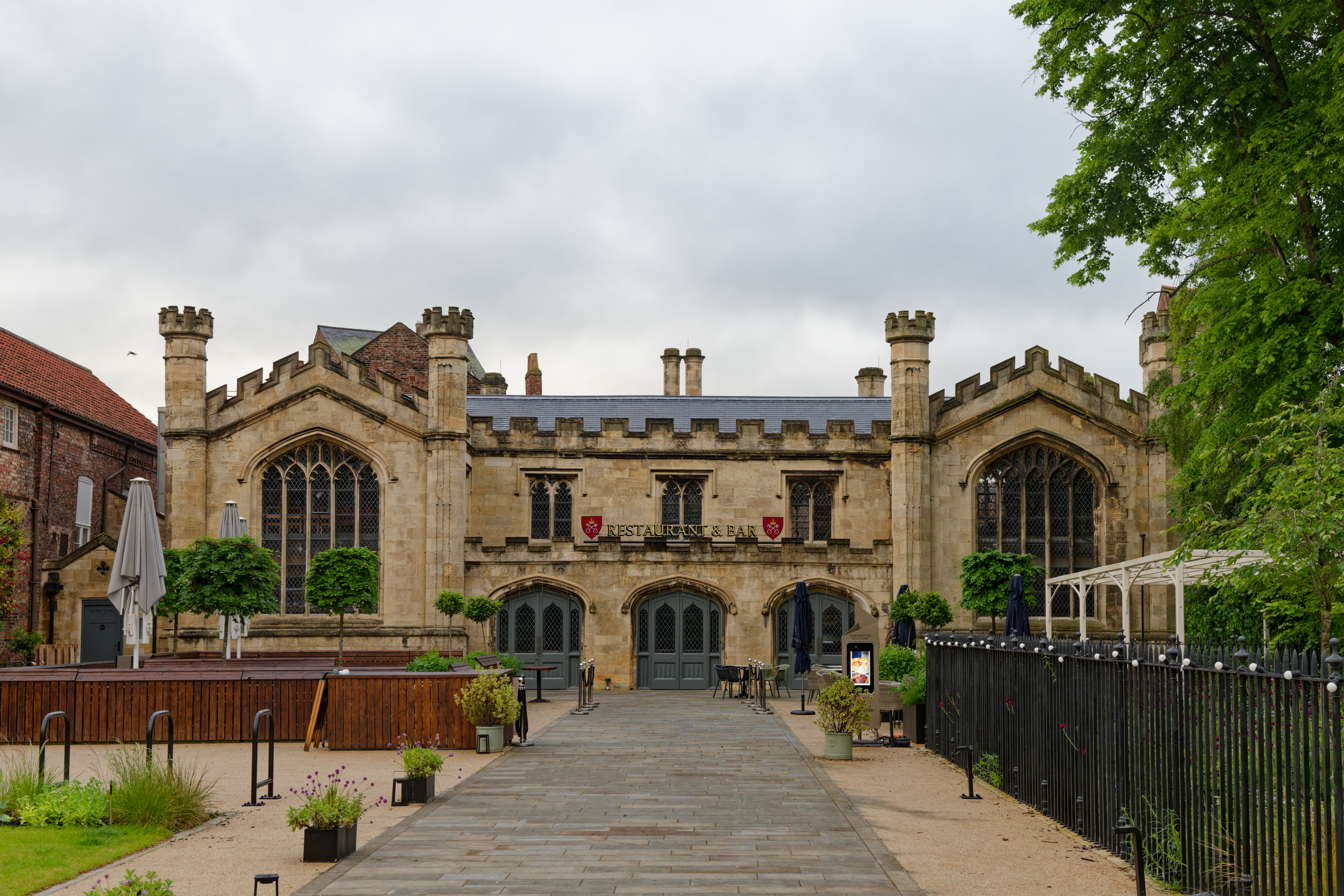
- The former school in 2024

Location
- 8 Minster Yard; York, North Yorkshire, YO1 7JA; England; 53.961716°N 1.080791°W

Information
- Type: Private preparatory day school; Choral foundation school; Cathedral school
- Religious affiliation: Church of England
- Established: 1903, but traces its origins back to 627
- Founder: Paulinus of York
- Closed: 2020
- Department for Education URN: 121731 Tables
- Head teacher: Angela Mitchell (former)
- Gender: Mixed
- Age: 3 to 13
- Enrolment: 161

The Minster School was an independent preparatory school for children aged 3–13 in York, England. It was founded to educate choristers at York Minster and continued to do so, although no longer exclusively, until in June 2020 it was announced that the school would close at the end of that term. The building is Grade II listed and has since been redeveloped as a restaurant, the York Minster Refectory.

The Choir School moved to St Peter's School, York, in September 2020.

== Location ==
The school occupied today's 8 Minster Yard, part of a complex of buildings in York, directly across from the York Minster.

The building was converted into the York Minster Refectory after the school's closure, and was opened by King Charles III on Maundy Thursday 2023.

== History ==
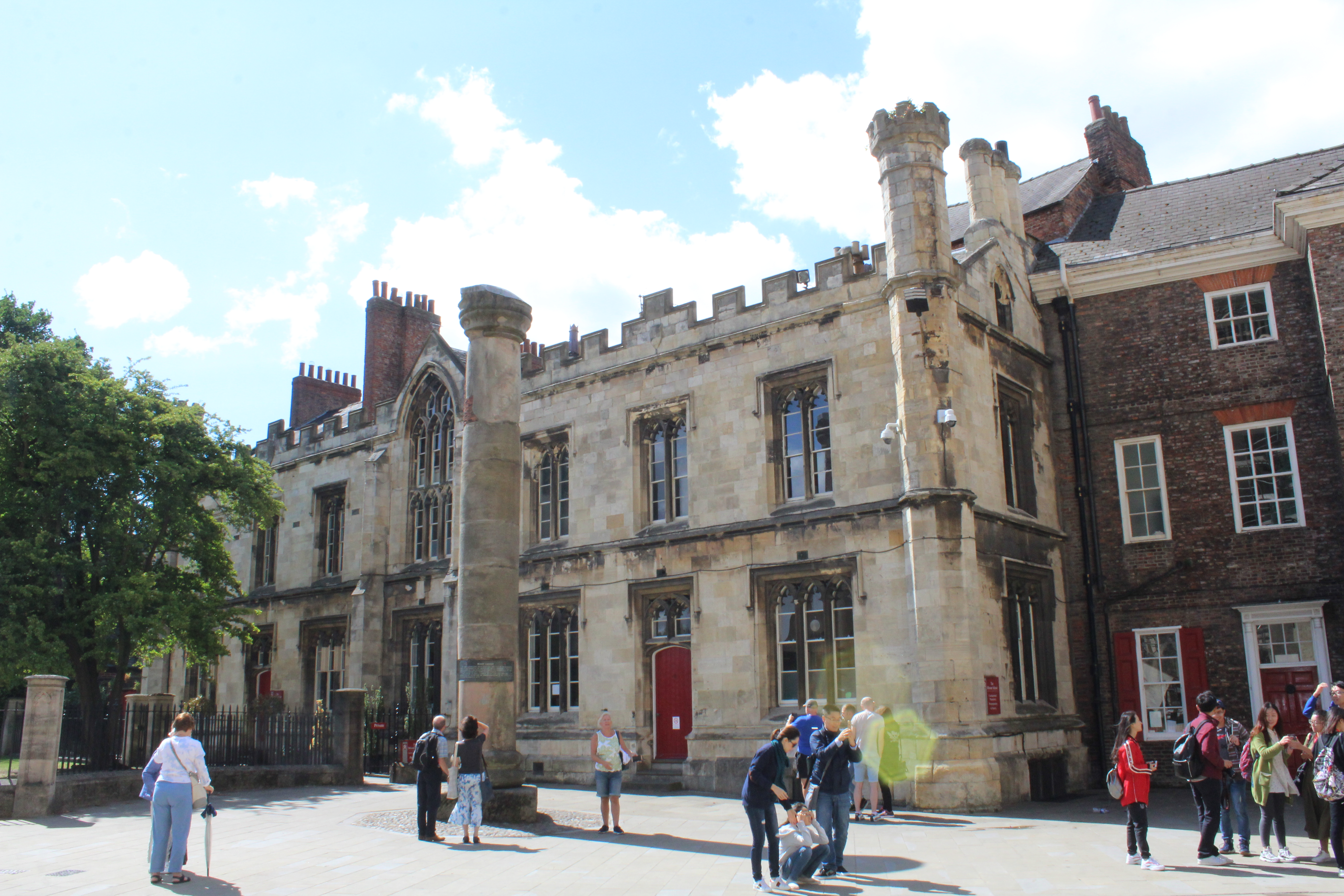
The building on the right (today's 9 Minster Yard) is one of the school's former constituent buildings. Built around 1755 for dean John Fountayne. The Roman column is also in view

The school traced its origins to a "song school" founded in 627 by Paulinus of York, the first Archbishop of York, however the current school was re-founded in 1903. The Minster School had a strong focus on music and, of the 180 pupils, 40 were choristers at York Minster.

Buildings used by the school have been awarded listed status, among them the school house built between 1830 and 1833, two houses dating from 1837, and a Georgian building from around 1755.

The school buildings were used to depict the House of Lords in the 2016 TV series Victoria.

=== Suspension of staff in 2018 ===
In May 2018, the school received national media attention when the headmaster and two senior staff members were suspended after three unsecured air rifles were found in a staff area on the premises. The dean of York faced protests from parents who supported the staff and objected to the way the suspensions had been handled. Faull was criticised by some for her approach to the situation. Two of the suspended staff were later reinstated, while the headteacher remained barred from returning. Donaldson, who had worked at the school for several decades, formally stepped down in November 2018. Before the suspensions, it had been reported that the Chapter of York had asked Donaldson to step down and had offered him a severance package, according to parents involved in the matter.

=== Closure ===
In June 2020, the Minster announced that due to the shortfall caused by the lack of visitors during the COVID-19 pandemic it was unable to keep the school open. The school closed at the end of the summer term that year. Choristers were transferred to St Peter's School and other pupils were left to find alternative schools. Following the school's closure in 2020, planning applications were submitted to convert the former Minster School building to commercial and community uses. The proposals included the change of use of the Grade II-listed former school to a restaurant (use class E) with a new kitchen, plant and service doors, the creation of level access and a platform lift, internal alterations and re-roofing, and the integration of solar photovoltaic panels on the roof. The plans also involved external repairs and landscaping improvements including public open space, cycle parking and associated amenities. Parts of the school were turned into office space for Minster staff. The conversion and building work is thought to have cost several million pounds.

== See also ==
- Listed buildings in York (within the city walls, northern part)
