= Minster Yard =

Street in York, England

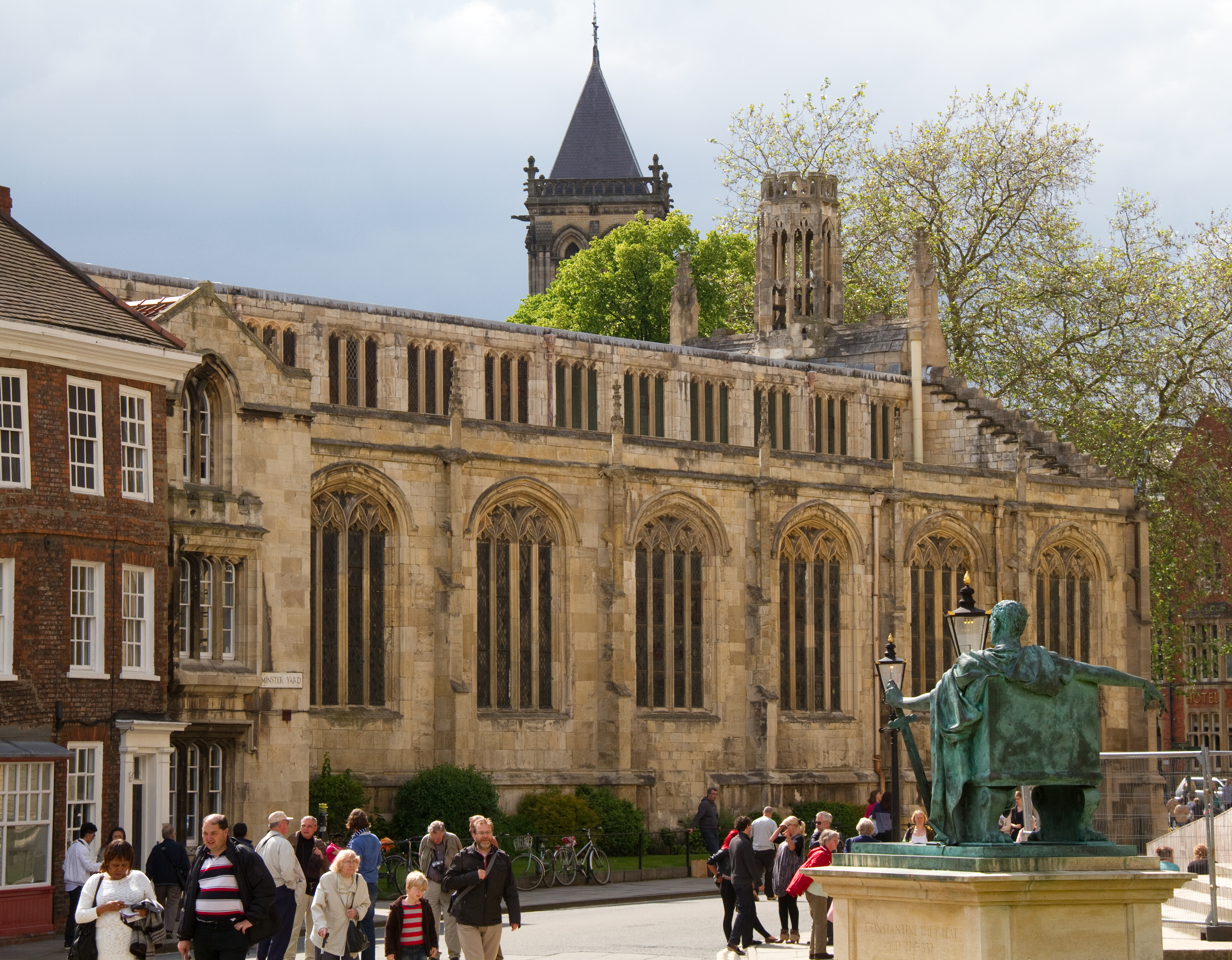
- Looking north-west on the street, towards St Michael le Belfrey
- Location within York
- Namesake: York Minster
- Maintained by: City of York
- Length: 0.33 mi (0.53 km)
- Location: York, England
- Postal code: YO
- Coordinates: 53.96292°N 1.081403282°W
- East: College Street
- South: Deangate
- West: High Petergate; Duncombe Place; Precentor's Court

Minster Yard is a street in the city centre of York, England. It runs along the southern, eastern and northeastern sides of York Minster, for which it is named.

== History ==
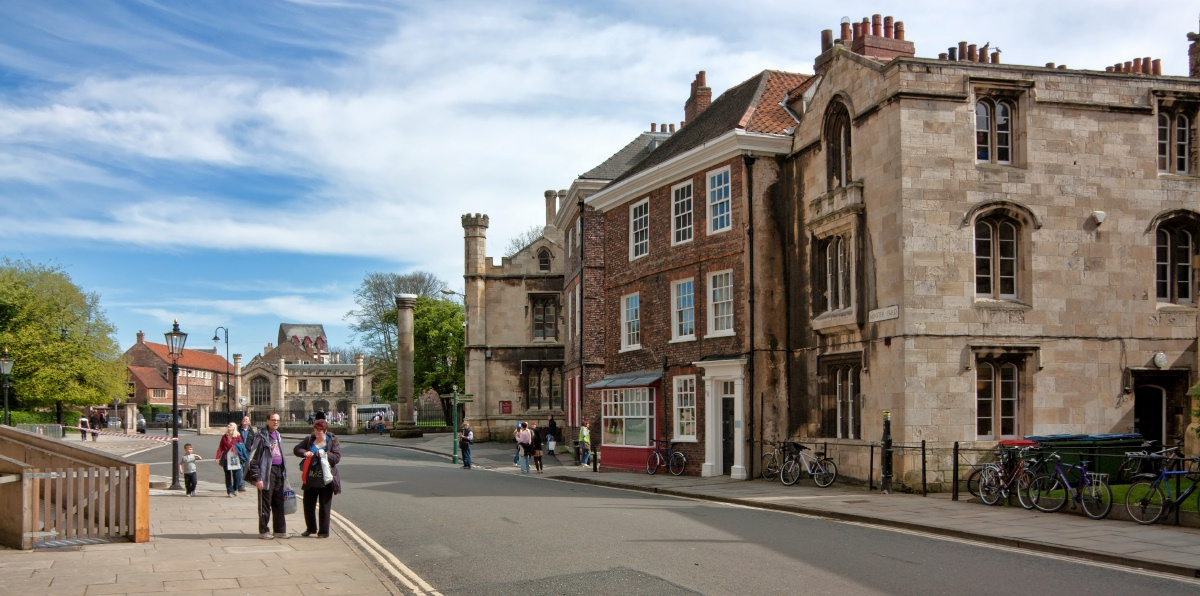
Looking east along Minster Yard towards Deangate

The street may have originated as the courtyard of the headquarters building of Roman Eboracum. In the 8th-century text The Earliest Life of Gregory the Great, a square between the royal palace and York Minster was mentioned, which has been tentatively identified with Minster Yard; however, in the 10th century, the area was covered by a cemetery associated with the minster.

In the late 11th century, York Minster was rebuilt on a new site, and Minster Yard, immediately south of the building, was paved. At the time, it provided a through route. It fell within the Minster Close, which was walled in 1283, and after the Minster was rebuilt and extended in 1365, it became a dead-end, accessed through one of two gates, by Lop Lane and Minster Gates.

York Minster Yard Act 1814
- Act of Parliament
- Parliament of the United Kingdom
- Long title: An Act for enlarging and improving The Minster Yard of the Cathedral and Metropolitical Church of Saint Peter, in York, and other Places adjacent thereto.
- Citation: 54 Geo. 3. c. lxiii

Dates
- Royal assent: 18 May 1814

Text of statute as originally enacted

The deanery of the Minster was built on the street, and the Peter Prison next to it. From 1828 to 1832, these were demolished, along with the gateways, opening up the area, and in 1903, Deangate was created, once again providing a route out of the street, to the south-east.

A Roman column excavated from under the Minster in 1969, now stands in the street, in front of the Minster School, and in 1998, a statue of Constantine the Great was erected.

== Layout and architecture ==
The street runs south-east from its junction with High Petergate, Duncombe Place and Precentor's Court, past a junction with Minster Gates, to its junction with Deangate. It then becomes a footpath and turns north-east until it meets College Street at College Green. Finally, it turns north-west, running past a junction with Chapter House Street, past York Deanery at 1A, through a gate, to a dead-end section alongside Dean's Park. The north side of the street is occupied by the south and east fronts of York Minster. On the south side lie Minster Court; the early-17th-century Treasurer's House; the 18th-century No. 4; No. 5, which has a core dating to about 1300; the mid-18th-century Old Residence at No. 6; and No. 7, built around 1730.

Beyond the southern tip of Deangate stands The Minster School at Nos. 8 and 9; the mid-18th-century No. 10; and No. 11, co-listed with 3–9 Minster Gates; followed by the parish room for St Michael le Belfrey at No. 12; and then the church itself.

== See also ==
- Listed buildings in York (within the city walls, northern part)
