= Roman column, York =

Grade II listed structure in York, England

Roman column
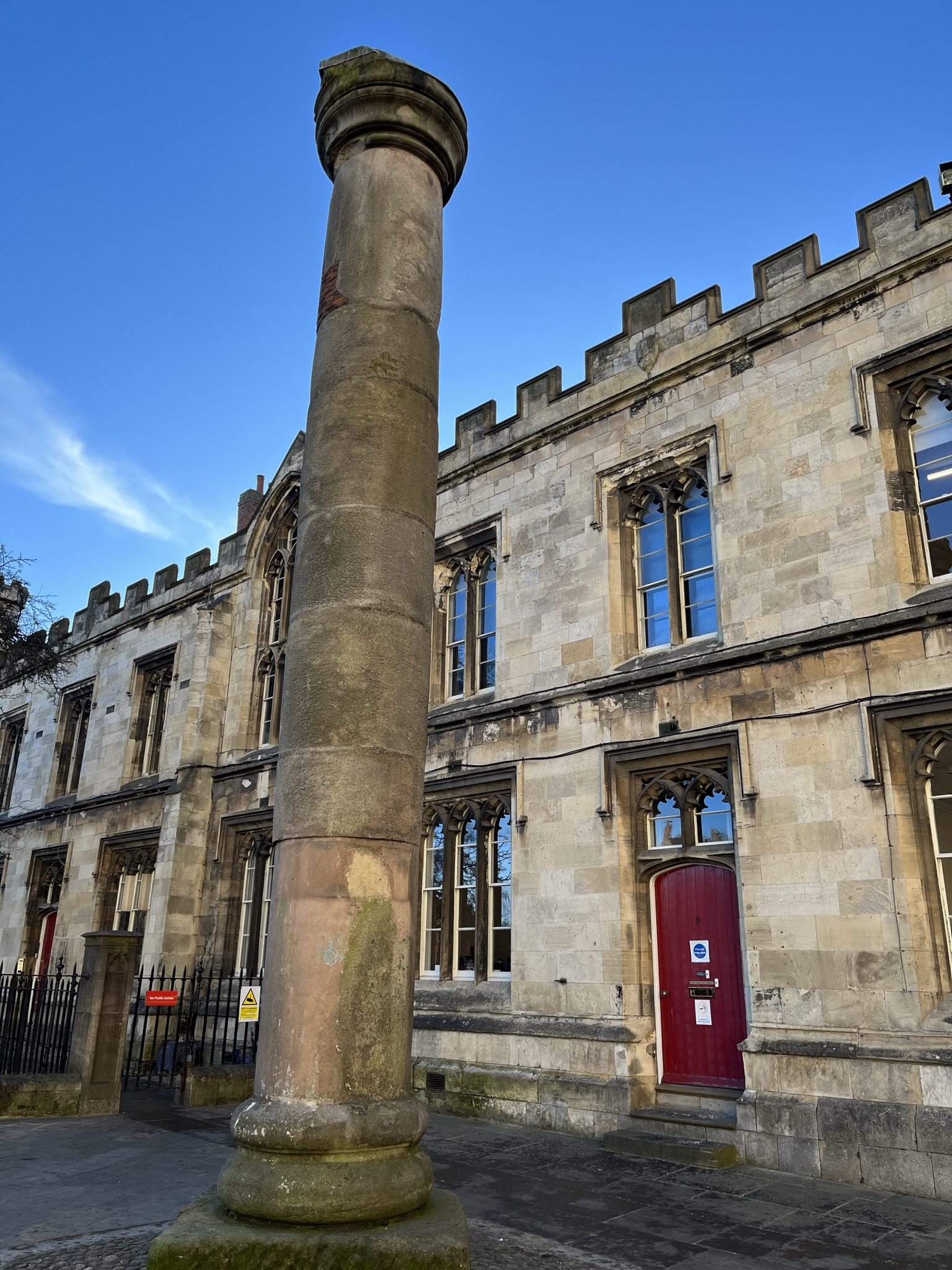
- The column in 2023
- Interactive map of Roman column
- Location: Minster Yard, York, England
- Coordinates: 53.96165°N 1.08180°W
- Type: Column
- Material: Magnesian Limestone and millstone grit
- Height: 7.6 metres (25 ft)
- Completion date: c. 100; 1926 years ago

A Roman column stands in Minster Yard in the English city of York. Originally built around the first century, by the soldiers of Legio IX Hispana, it was reused by Legion VI in the 4th century. It is believed to have been part of a group of sixteen freestanding columns (eight on each side of the aisle), supporting the walls of a basilica on the site.

The column was discovered beneath York Minster during a 1969 excavation, and was given to the City of York three years later to mark the 1900th anniversary of the city's founding.

The column is 7.6 metres (25 ft) tall and constructed of Magnesian Limestone and millstone grit. It now stands in front of the Minster School, in Minster Yard, on the southern side of York Minster.
