= Minster Gates =

Street in York, England

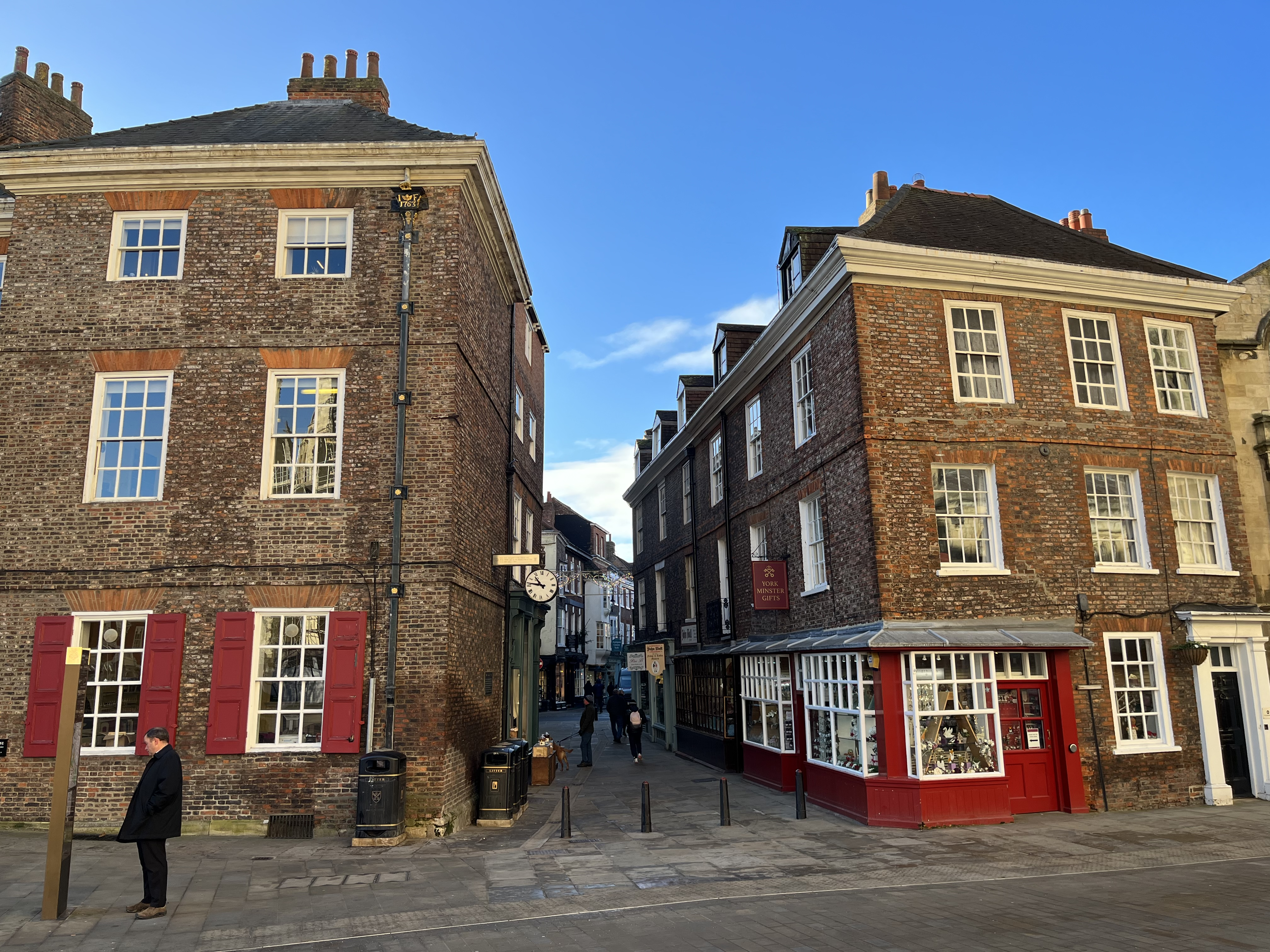
- Minster Gates' northern end at Minster Yard
- Location within York
- Former names: Bookland Lane; Bookbinders' Alley
- Maintained by: City of York
- Location: York, England
- Postal code: YO
- Coordinates: 53.9616270°N 1.082215°W
- North: Minster Yard
- South: High Petergate

Minster Gates is a north–south running street in the city centre of York, England, connecting Minster Yard and High Petergate. All of its buildings are listed, many dating to the 18th century, although the street is significantly older.

== History ==
The street originated as the northernmost part of Stonegate, running through a gate providing access to the Minster Close, around York Minster. Between the late 13th century and 1838, St Peter's Prison stood on the street.

The road was pedestrianised by 1370, when posts blocked traffic through the gate. By 1470, the street was known as Bookland Lane, at which time it was the location of a public drinking fountain. The street later became known as Bookbinders' Alley. This referred to the printing industry which was based in the area, serving in particular the clergy of the Minster. The trade boomed after 1662, when Charles II made York one of only four English cities permitted to publish books.

By the 1730s, the street was regarded as the main entrance to the Minster Close. The gateway was demolished in about 1800.

== Layout and architecture ==
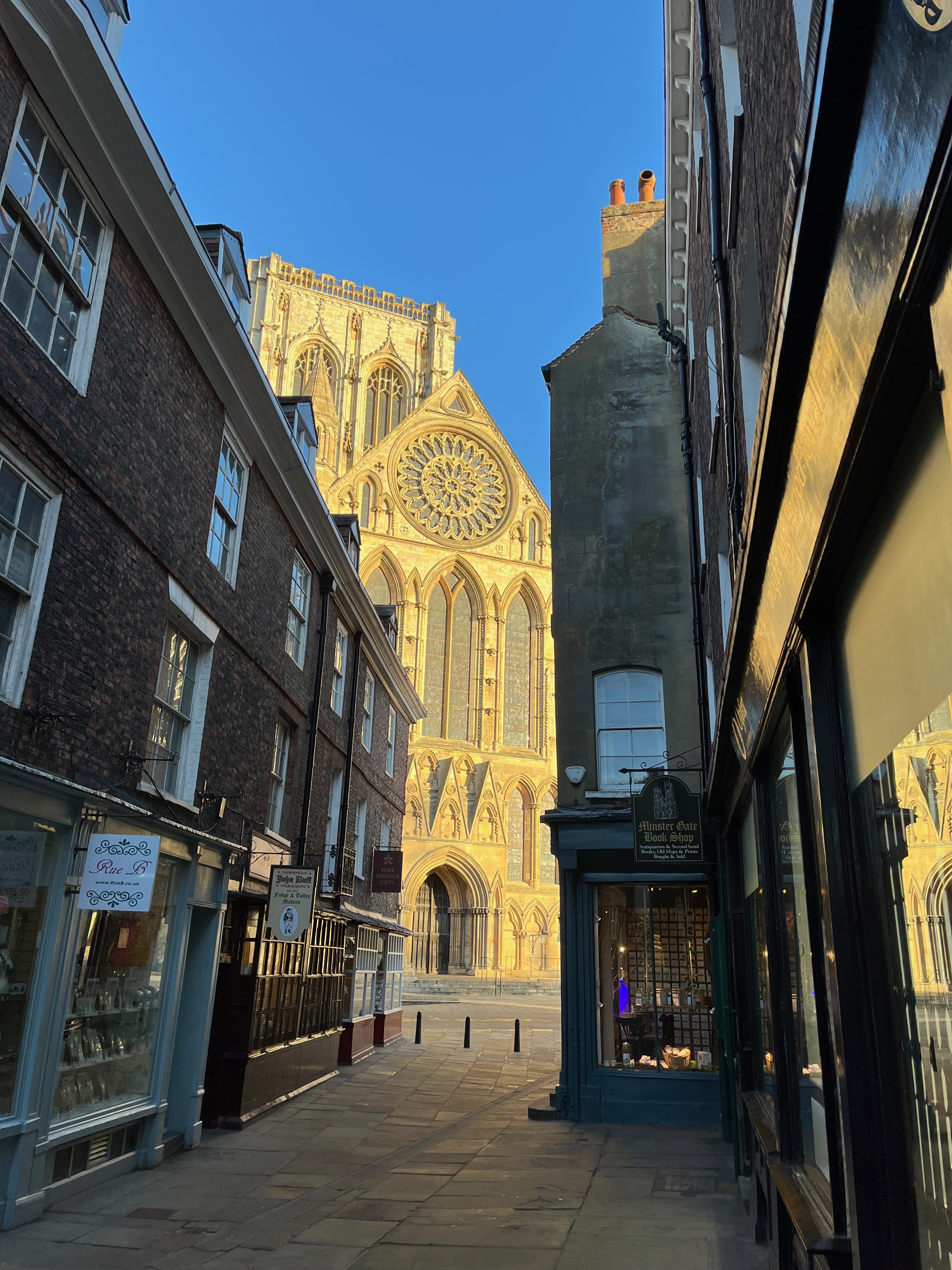
View of York Minster's southern façade from Minster Gates

The street runs north-east from the junction of Stonegate and Petergate to Minster Yard, opposite the south door of York Minster.

All the buildings on the street are listed. On the western side lie No. 1, with 15th-century origins; and Nos. 3–9, a terrace of three-storey houses built in the early 18th century. On the eastern side are Nos. 2–8, a terrace built in the 1840s; No. 10, constructed around 1755 along with an earlier No. 8, which was demolished; and 10 Minster Yard, completed in 1763.

== See also ==
- Listed buildings in York (within the city walls, northern part)
