= 10 Minster Gates =

Listed building in York, England

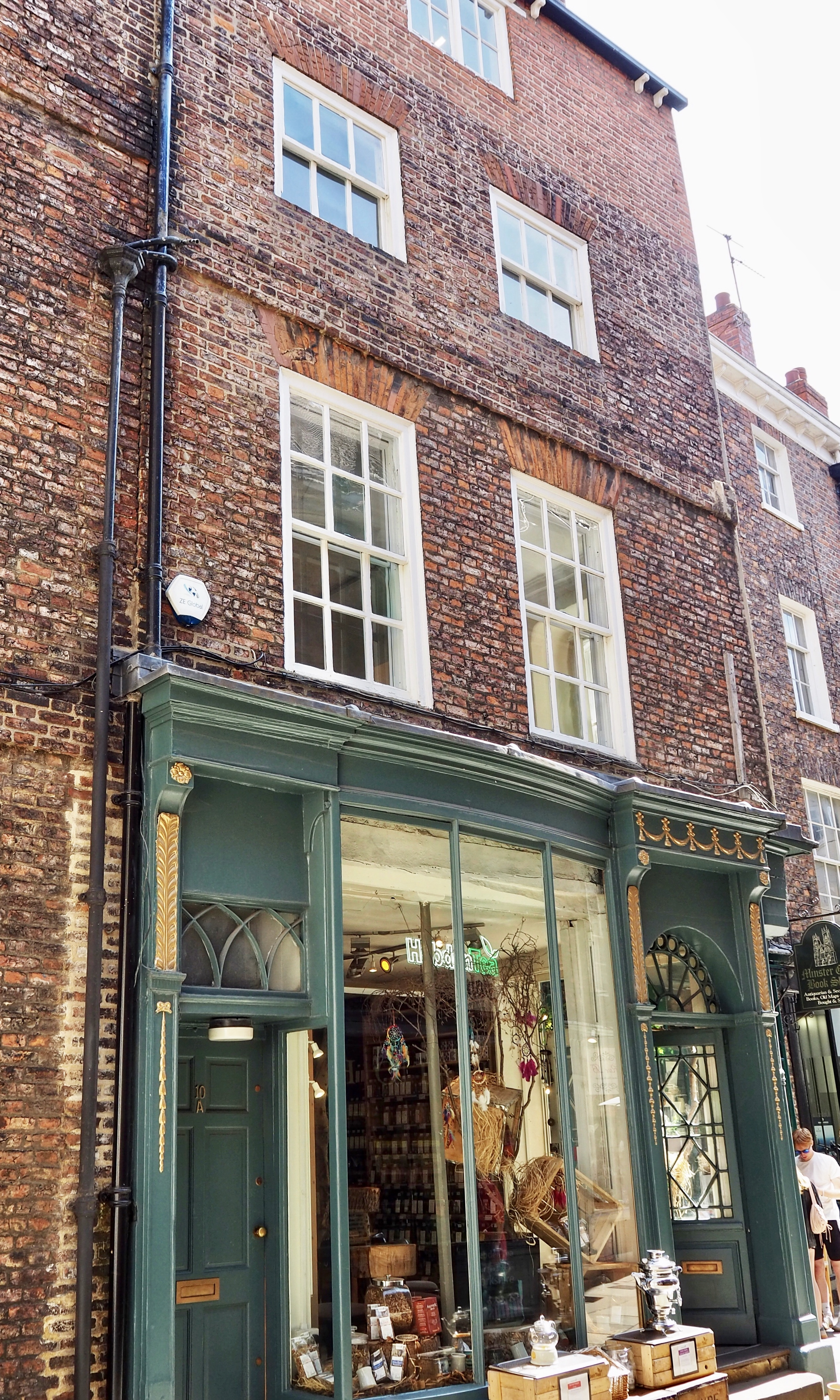
- The building in 2025
- Interactive map of the 10 Minster Gates area

General information
- Type: Shop (originally a house)
- Location: Minster Gates, York, England
- Coordinates: 53°57′42″N 1°04′56″W
- Year built: c. 1755; 271 years ago
- Renovated: Early 19th century (shopfront); Mid-19th century (raised and altered)
- Client: John Fountayne

Design and construction
- Designations

Listed Building – Grade II*
- Official name: 10, Minster Gates
- Designated: 14 June 1954
- Reference no.: 1257247

10 Minster Gates is a Grade II* listed building on Minster Gates in the city of York, England. Built around 1755 for John Fountayne, the dean of York, it originally formed one of a pair with No. 8. A shopfront was added in the early 19th century, when the ground floor was opened up, and in the mid‑19th century the front was raised to four storeys with a new attic after the adjoining house, formerly No. 8, was demolished. The building was included in the Central Historic Core conservation area in 1968. It is now occupied by Hebden Tea and adjoins Nos. 2–8, a Grade II‑listed terrace built around 1840.

== History ==
Originally one of a pair of houses on Minster Gates, it was built around 1755 for John Fountayne, the dean of York, and leased to William Darwin, the verger. It stood as a three‑storey house with an attic and formed a pair with No. 8. A shopfront was inserted in the early 19th century, when the ground‑floor walls were removed, and about the middle of the century the front was raised to four storeys and a new attic created partly over the stair‑well, following the demolition of the adjoining house, formerly No. 8 before the construction of the present terrace. The rear of 10 Minster Yard, built in 1763 as Fountayne's home, adjoins the left‑hand side of No. 10.

On 14 June 1954, No. 10 was designated a Grade II* listed building, and in 1968 the site was included within the newly established Central Historic Core conservation area. No. 10 is now occupied by Hebden Tea. It adjoins Nos. 2–8, a Grade II-listed terrace built around 1840.

== Architecture ==
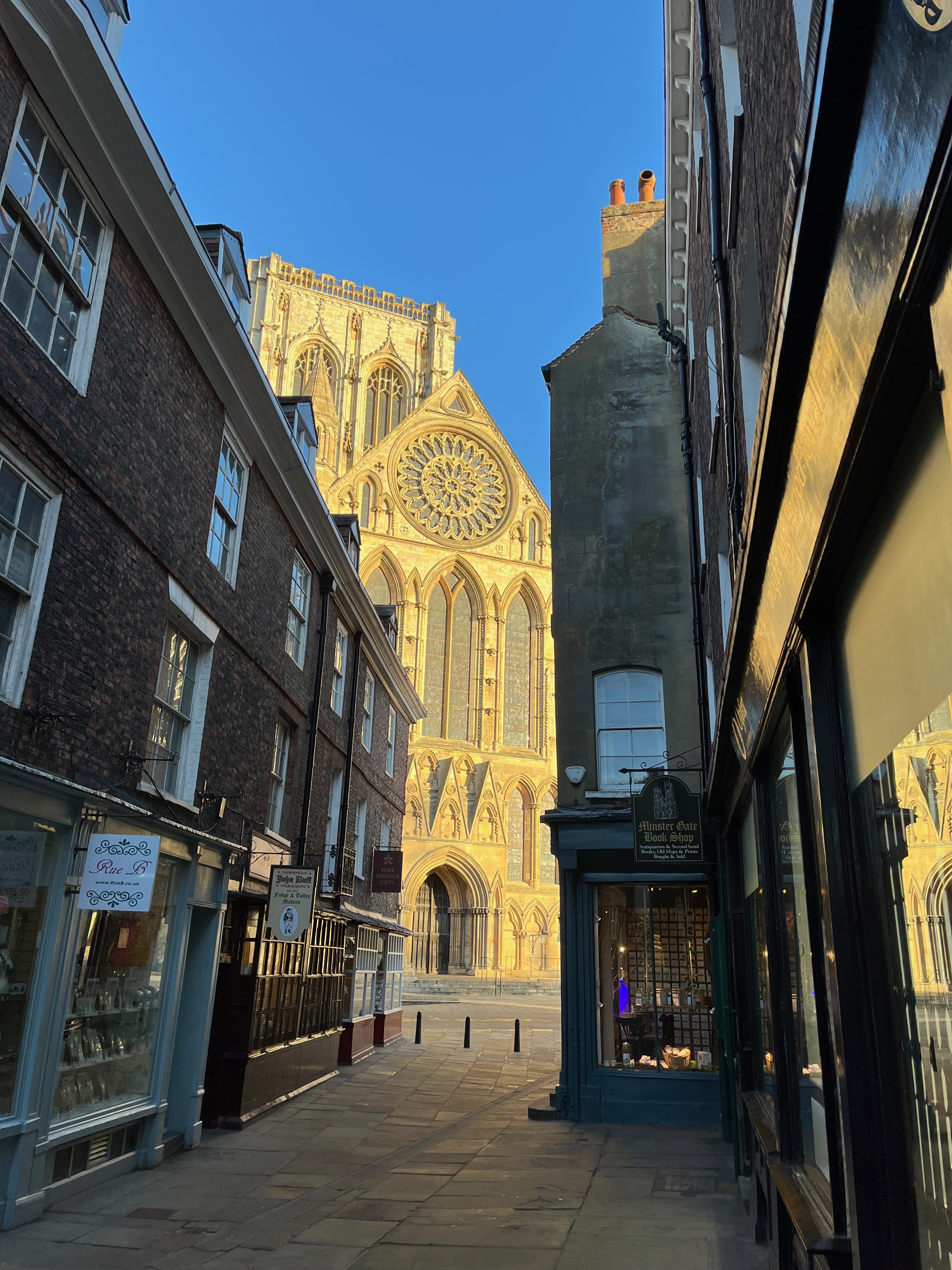
The building's gable end, right of centre

The front is built of orange‑grey brick, later raised in matching brick, with the right side rendered. It has a timber shopfront and timber guttering, and a tiled roof with a brick chimney. The building has four storeys and two windows. The shop window is a shallow bow with three large panes. To the right is a two‑leaf shop door with decorative glazing and a fanlight, set in a detailed timber surround; to the left is an upstairs door with six panels and a Gothic‑style overlight in a similar frame. All sit beneath a moulded cornice. The first‑floor windows are 12‑pane sashes, the second‑floor windows are shorter six‑pane sashes, and the top floor has a small casement window. A raised brick band marks the second floor.

At the rear, the ground floor has a wide window with small panes, and the other windows have shallow brick arches. On the right side, a later two‑light shop window has been added in a plain frame.

=== Interior ===
The ground-floor ceiling includes a shallow domed feature with fluted decoration, set within a moulded frame and carried on fluted columns; one column is visible, with the others likely enclosed. The main staircase from the first floor upwards is original and has elaborate turned balusters. Several original doors, surrounds and fireplaces also remain.

== See also ==
- Grade II* listed buildings in the City of York
- Listed buildings in York (within the city walls, northern part)
