= Listed buildings in High Melton =

High Melton is a civil parish in the metropolitan borough of Doncaster, South Yorkshire, England. The parish contains eight listed buildings that are recorded in the National Heritage List for England. Of these, one is listed at Grade II*, the middle of the three grades, and the others are at Grade II, the lowest grade. The parish contains the village of High Melton and the surrounding area. All the listed buildings are in the village, and consist of a church, a country house later used for other purposes, houses, cottages, farmhouses, a former village hall, and a milestone.

== Key ==
Grade	Criteria
II*	Particularly important buildings of more than special interest
II	Buildings of national importance and special interest

== Buildings ==
Name and location	Photograph	Date	Notes	Grade
St James' Church; 53.51054°N 1.23375°W		12th century	The church, which was altered and extended through the centuries, and restored in the 19th century, is built in limestone with stone slate roofs. It consists of a nave with a clerestory, a chancel, a continuous south aisle overlapping the tower, a south porch, and a west tower. The tower is in Perpendicular style, and has diagonal buttresses, a two-light west window, a northwest stair turret with slit windows, and a clock face. At the top is a string course with gargoyles, and an embattled parapet with crocketed pinnacles.	II*
Manor House; 53.51199°N 1.23322°W	—	Late 16th to early 17th century (probable)	The house, which has been much altered, is roughcast, and has a tile roof. There are two storeys and attics, a main range of four bays, a rear wing on the left, and additions on the right. On the front is a doorway with a chamfered surround and a pointed arch. To its left is a canopy over a doorway with a square head and a bay window. The other windows are casements with two or three lights.	II
High Melton Hall; 53.51071°N 1.23517°W	—	1757	A country house, it was extended in 1878, and there were major alterations and a change in use in 1949–52. It is in sandstone with slate roofs, and has an H-shaped plan. The entrance front has a plinth, quoins, a modillion cornice and blocking course, eleven bays, and a recessed bay on the right. The middle seven bays have three storeys, with a central square rusticated porch that has paired blocked columns, and a round arch with a keystone, over which is an inscribed frieze, and a cornice surmounted by two elephants. The windows are sashes, the window above the doorway with an architrave, voussoirs, and a segmental pediment. Two windows in the ground floor have architraves and three projecting voussoirs, and above them, in the middle floor, the windows have cornices on consoles. On the left return is a three-storey canted bay window with balustraded aprons and a pediment.	II
Milestone; 53.51202°N 1.23200°W		Late 18th century (probable)	The milestone is against a wall on the south side of Doncaster Road. It is in limestone and consists of a partly-buried round-headed slab. Most of the inscription is indecipherable.	II
The Leylands; 53.51176°N 1.23307°W	—	Late 18th century	A farmhouse, later extended at the rear, it is in limestone, with quoins, and a stone slate roof with coped gables and shaped kneelers. There are three storeys and four bays. On the front is a doorway and the windows are sashes.	II
Red House Farmhouse; 53.51275°N 1.23156°W	—	Late 19th century	A red brick farmhouse on a stone plinth, with a sill band, and a hipped tile roof. There are two storeys, a symmetrical front of five bays, and a rear wing on the right. The central round-arched doorway has pilasters, a fanlight, and a cornice. The windows are sashes, the window above the doorway with a round head and an architrave. In the left return are two tripartite windows.	II
1–7 Doncaster Road, wall and outbuildings 53.51199°N 1.23374°W		1904	A group of limestone cottages, with quoins, and a Westmorland slate roof, in Arts and Crafts style. There are two storeys and a symmetrical front of four bays, the outer bays projecting under coped gables with shaped kneelers. The doorways have chamfered quoined surrounds, and the windows are casements with mullions. The doorways in the central part are in segmental-headed recesses, and above them are half-dormers. At the rear is a walled yard with outbuildings.	II
Students Union Building; 53.51166°N 1.23344°W	—	Early 20th century	A village hall, later used for other purposes, it is pebbledashed, and has a Westmorland slate roof with moulded gable copings and carved kneelers, and is in Arts and Crafts style. There is a T-shaped plan, with a two-storey single-bay central block with a stair projection to the right, and single-storey side-wings at the rear. The central arched doorway has an architrave, and a cornice on consoles, carved with oak leaves and roses. The flanking single-light windows have moulded quoined surrounds and hood moulds, and above is a five-light window with ogee-headed lights.	II
