= Statue of Constantine the Great, York =

Bronze statue in York, England

Statue of Constantine the Great
- Artist: Philip Jackson
- Year: 1998
- Location: Minster Yard, York Minster, York, England

The Statue of Constantine the Great is a bronze statue of the Roman emperor Constantine I in York, England. It shows Constantine seated on a throne, and commemorates his accession as Roman emperor in AD 306 after the death of his father Constantius Chlorus in York.

The statue, which was unveiled in 1998, was commissioned by York Civic Trust and designed by the sculptor Philip Jackson. It is situated on Minster Yard, outside York Minster.

== Description ==
The statue depicts a seated Constantine wearing military dress. His right arm is outstretched behind him and his left holds the pommel of a sword, the tip of which is shown to be broken. A legend inscribed on the base reads "Constantine by this sign conquer". This phrase is a translation of the Latin in hoc signo vinces; a reference to a passage from the historian Eusebius of Caesaria, who recounts how Constantine was marching with his army and looked up to the sun and saw a cross of light above it, and with it the Greek words "(ἐν) τούτῳ νίκα" ("In this, conquer").

== Interactions with the statue ==
=== Yorkshire Day ===
The statue was one of several in York gagged by the Yorkshire Party on Yorkshire Day (1 August) 2016 as part of a campaign to highlight the lack of devolved government in the region.

On Yorkshire Day 2018 the statue was dressed in a flat cap and given two chocolate themed props: a giant Kit Kat and Terry's Chocolate Orange.

=== Theft of sword ===
The statue's sword was stolen in September 2016. A homeless man, John Flanagan, was prosecuted for the damage – the sword had been kicked from the statue and then brandished by Flanagan before he deposited it in a drain. The restoration of the statue by York Civic Trust was undertaken in November 2016 and cost £783.

=== 'Culture War' ===
In June 2020 the Daily Telegraph reported that the statue was 'under review' following complaints received by York Minster about Constantine's support of slavery in light of the Black Lives Matter movement. In subsequent articles in The Guardian and the York Press it was reported that the York Minster had not received any complaints about the statue and that it was not specifically under review. The Guardian described the story as an "imaginary statue scandal" as part of a culture war.

== Popular culture ==
In CD Projekt RED's card game, Gwent: The Witcher Card Game, Nilfgaardian deck leader Emperor Jan Calveit's artwork by Lorenzo Mastroianni was inspired by this statue.

== Gallery ==

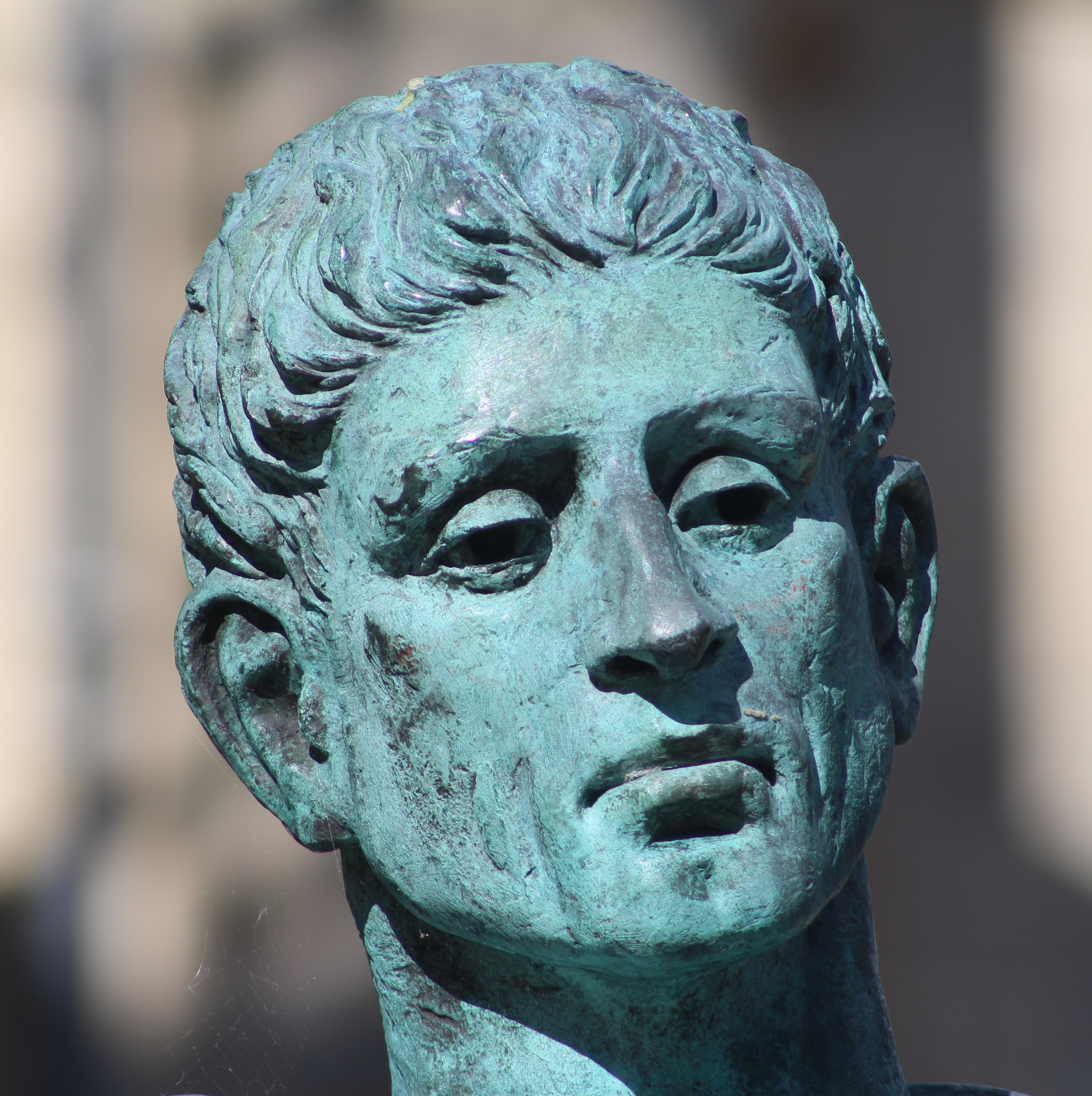

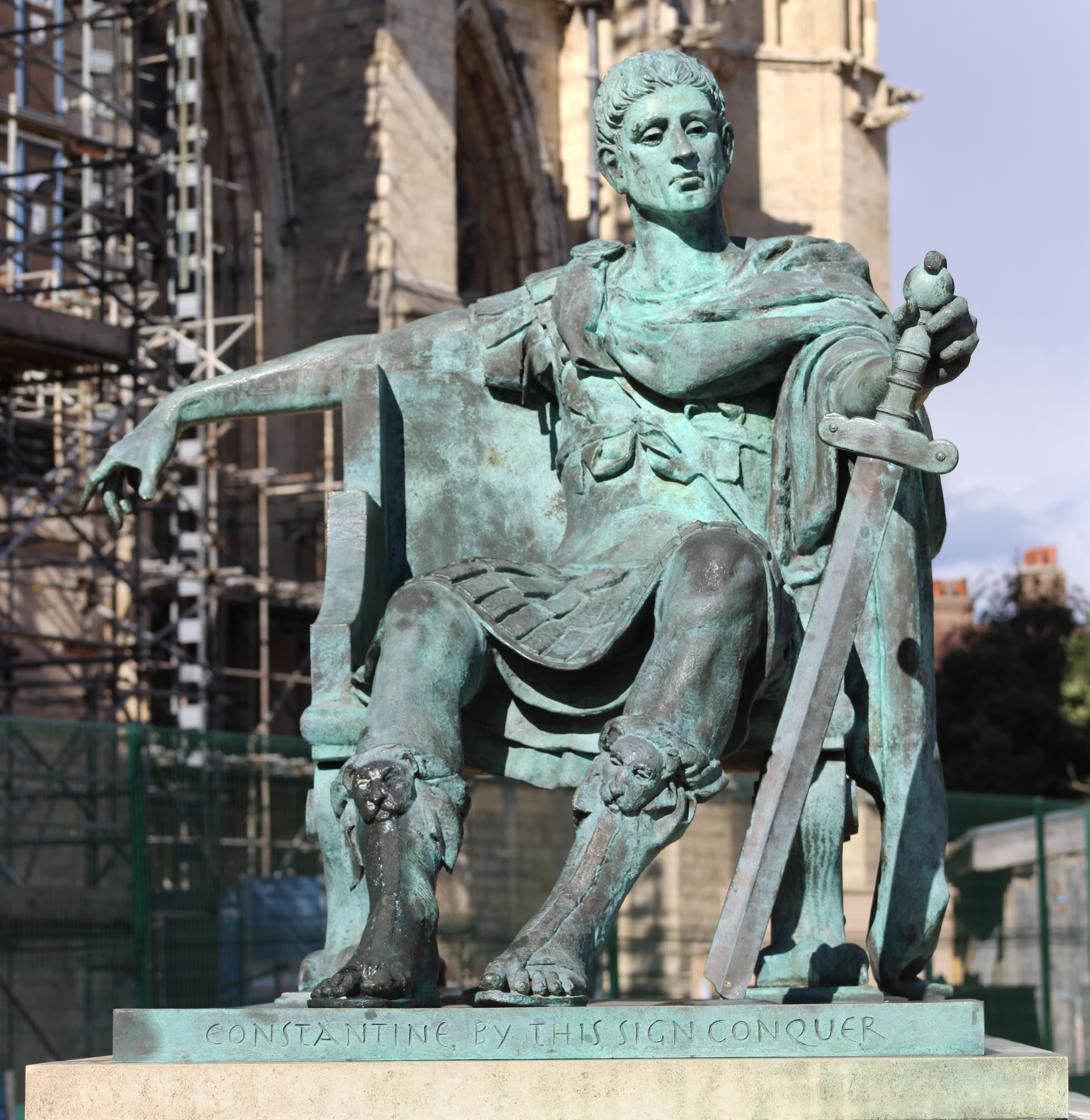

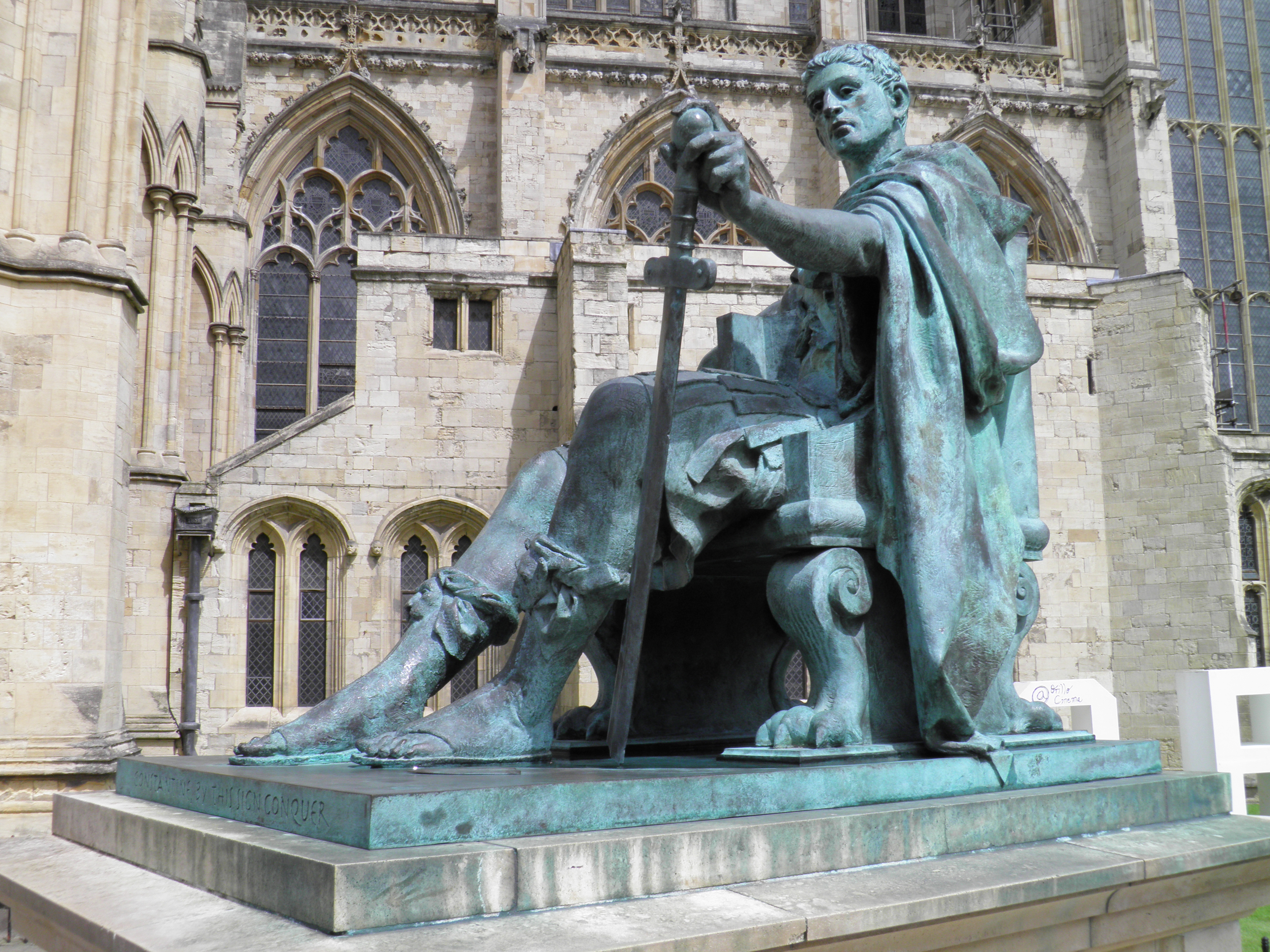

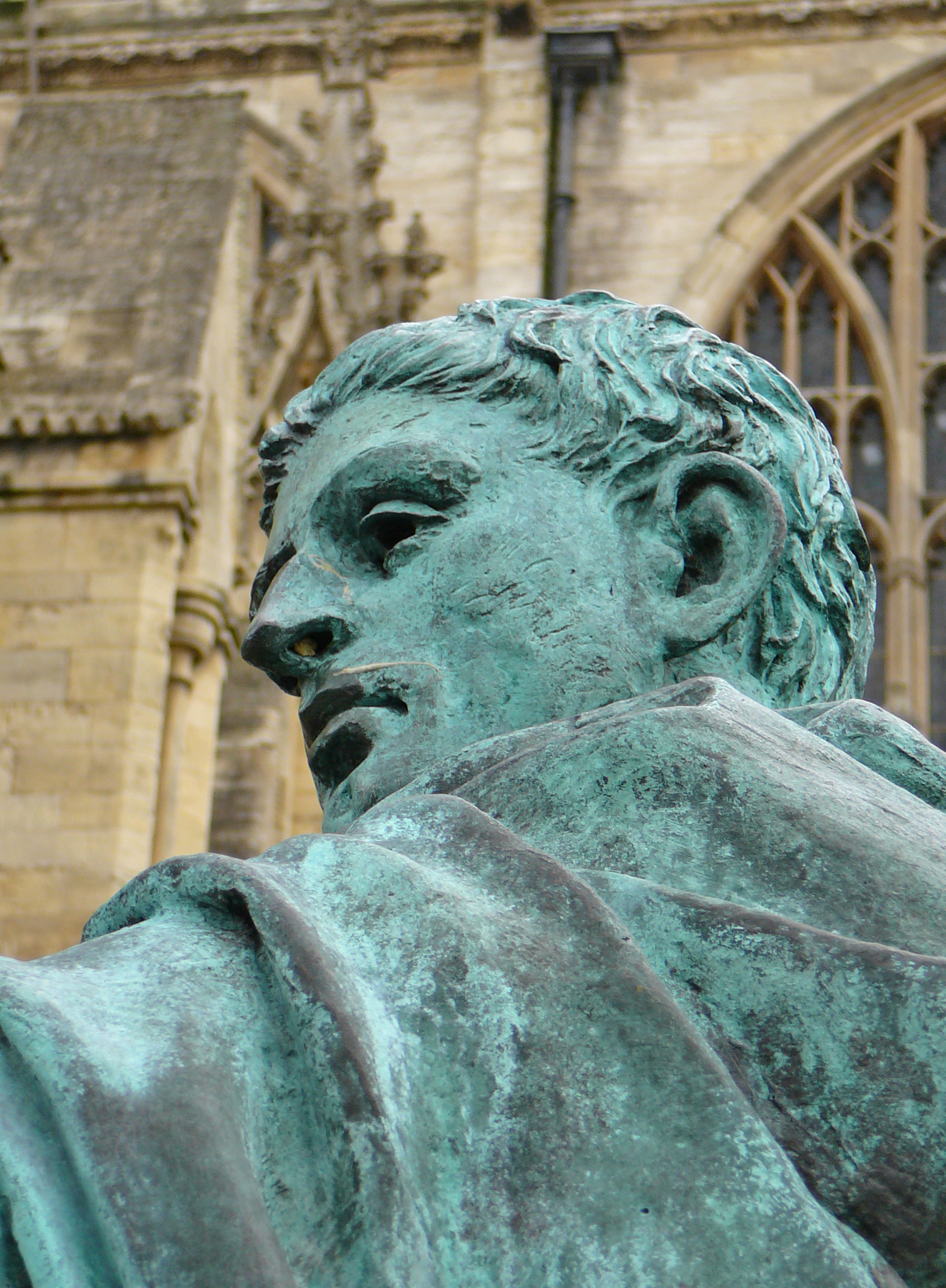

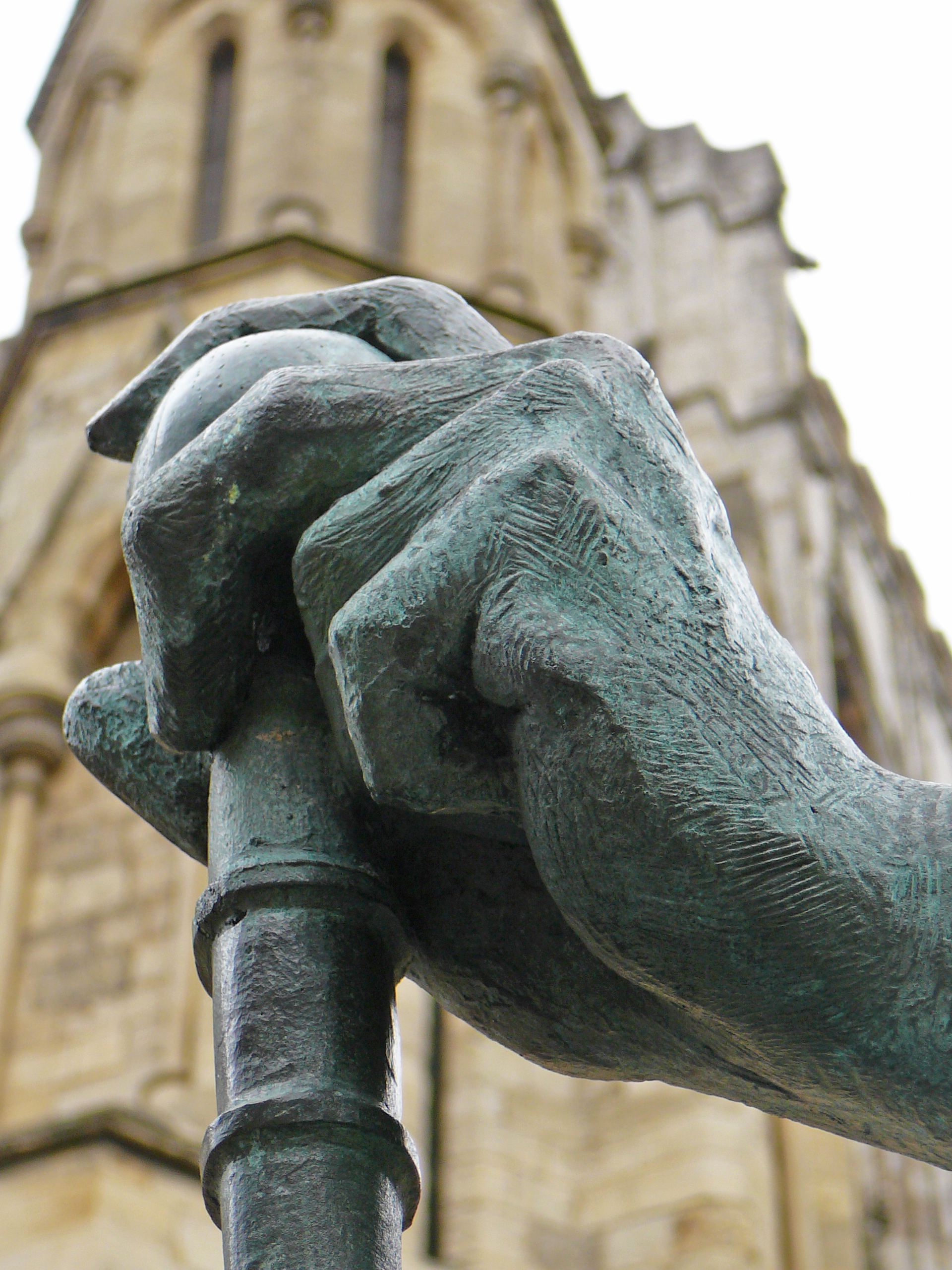

== See also ==
- Head of Constantine the Great, York
