= 1 Minster Gates and 38 High Petergate =

Listed building in York, England

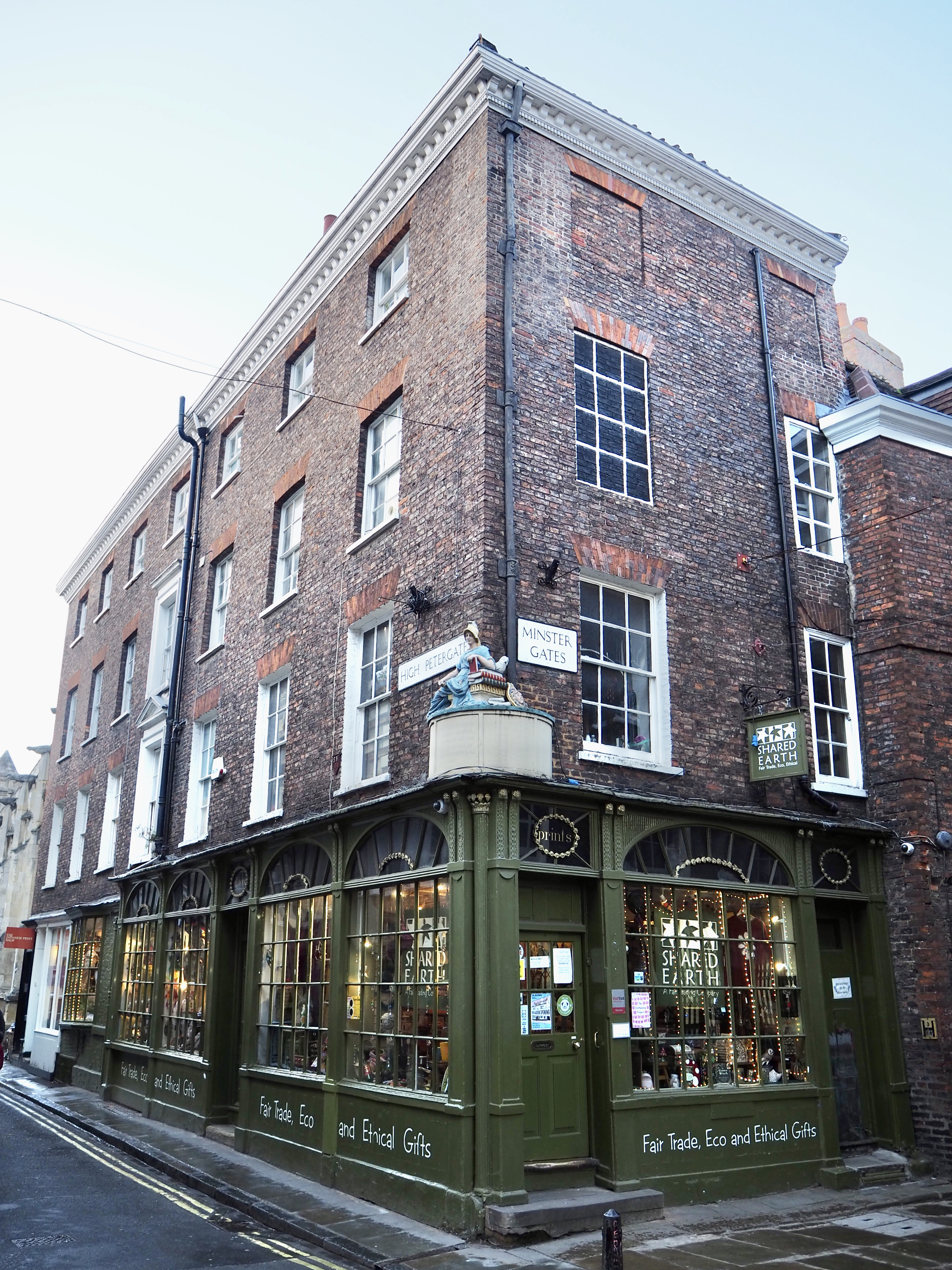
- The building in 2023
- Interactive map of the 1 Minster Gates and 38 High Petergate area

General information
- Location: High Petergate and Minster Gates, York, England
- Coordinates: 53°57′42″N 1°04′57″W
- Year built: c. 1500
- Renovated: Late 18th and early 19th centuries

Technical details
- Floor count: 4

Design and construction
- Designations

Listed Building – Grade II*
- Official name: 38, High Petergate, 1, Minster Gates
- Designated: 14 June 1954
- Reference no.: 1257244

1 Minster Gates and 38 High Petergate is a historic building in the city centre of York, England.

The building was constructed in about 1500, at one of the most prestigious locations in the city, the junction of High Petergate and Minster Gates. It was originally a three-storey timber-framed, jettied house, with a fourth storey added in the late 16th century. In the late 18th century, the facades on both streets were rebuilt in brick. In 1801, the house was split into two properties, and the ground floor was converted into retail space, with shop windows added. This work was probably undertaken for John Wolstenholme, who ran a bookshop out of the building, and a statue of Minerva survives at the corner of the building, constructed to advertise his business. Its restoration was funded by York Civic Trust. The building has been Grade II* listed since 1954.

1 Minster Gates is occupied by Shared Earth, an ethical trade shop founded in 1986. It employs prisoners nearing the end of their sentences, but was in the news in 2024 after one ex-offender employed by the business stole £17,000 from the business. Since 1976, 38 High Petergate has been the Japanese Print Shop, selling Japanese woodblock prints.

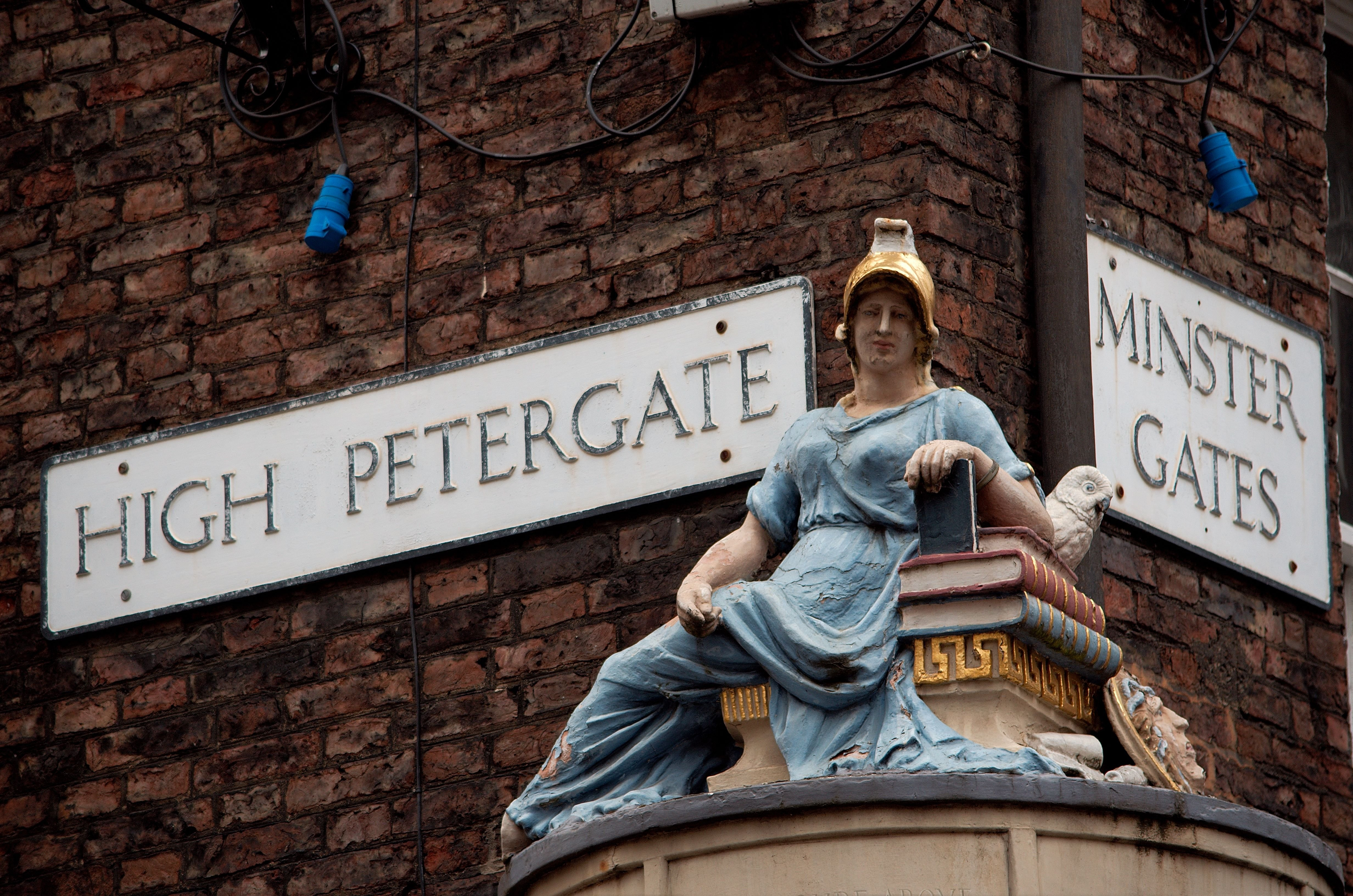
The statue in 2011

The building has a two-bay front on Minster Gates, and a seven-bay front on High Petergate. Some timber-framing remains, although the external walls are now in brown brick, while the roof is pantiled. There are two doors to Minster Gates, one now blocked, and one 28-pane window, with a fanlight above. To High Petergate, four similar windows flank a door. Two of the fanlights are inscribed: "Stationery" and "Prints". The statue of Minerva shows her reclining on a pile of books. The three leftmost bays have now been divided into two further shops, each with a separate front.

Inside, there is an altered 18th-century straight staircase from the ground floor to the first, and a winding staircase from there up to the third floor. There is a second 18th-century staircase at the rear of the building. The ground-floor shop entered from Minster Gates has three early doorframes, and a second room has a shallow dome. The first-floor room of 38 High Petergate has an old fireplace, and a room entirely panelled in early 17th-century work.

== See also ==
- Grade II* listed buildings in the City of York
- Listed buildings in York (within the city walls, northern part)
