= Old Residence =

Listed building in York, England

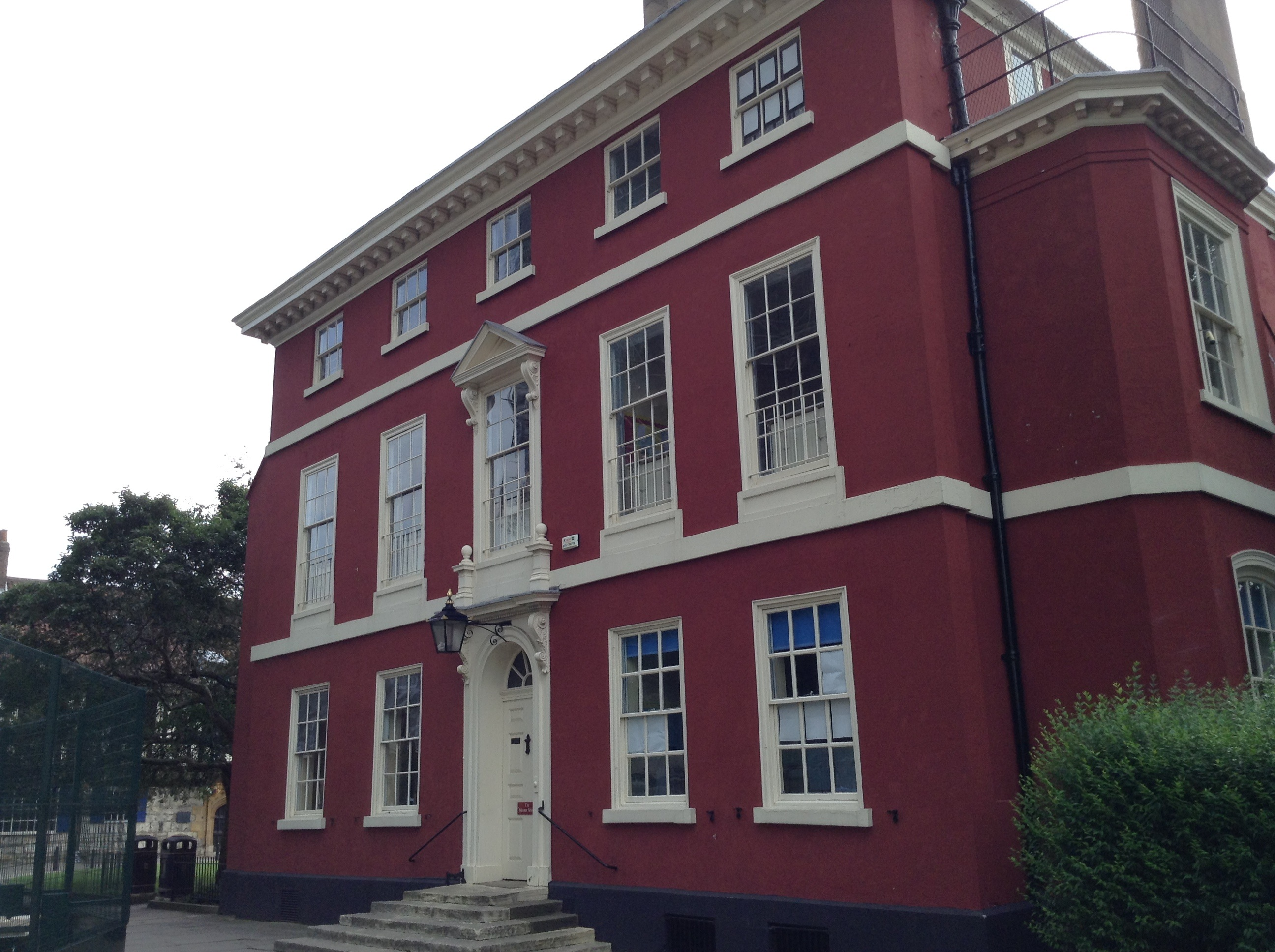
- The building in 2014
- Interactive map of the Old Residence area
- Alternative names: 6 Minster Yard

General information
- Location: Minster Yard, York, England
- Coordinates: 53°57′43″N 1°04′50″W
- Completed: Early 18th century
- Renovated: 1786 (raised and reroofed); Late 19th century (extended)

Technical details
- Floor count: 3 + cellar

Design and construction
- Designations

Listed Building – Grade II*
- Official name: 6, Minster Yard
- Designated: 14 June 1954
- Reference no.: 1257256

Old Residence is a historic building in the city of York, North Yorkshire, England. A Grade II* listed building, located at 6 Minster Yard, at its junction with College Street, it dates to the early 18th century, but it was raised and reroofed in 1786, as well as receiving a small extension in the late 19th century.

The building stands about 30 feet (9.1 m) from York Minster's south-eastern corner.

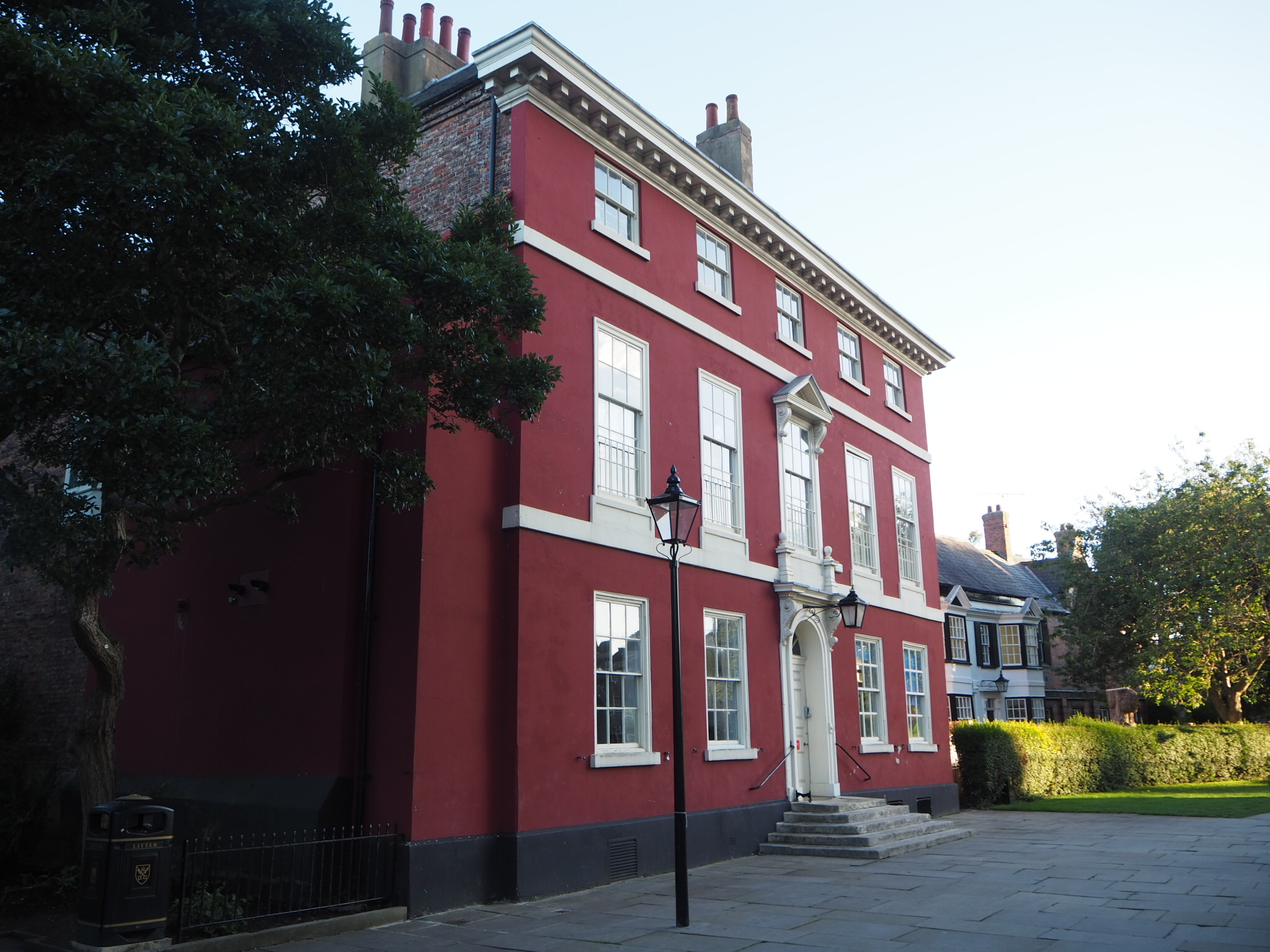
Looking south down Minster Yard towards Deangate

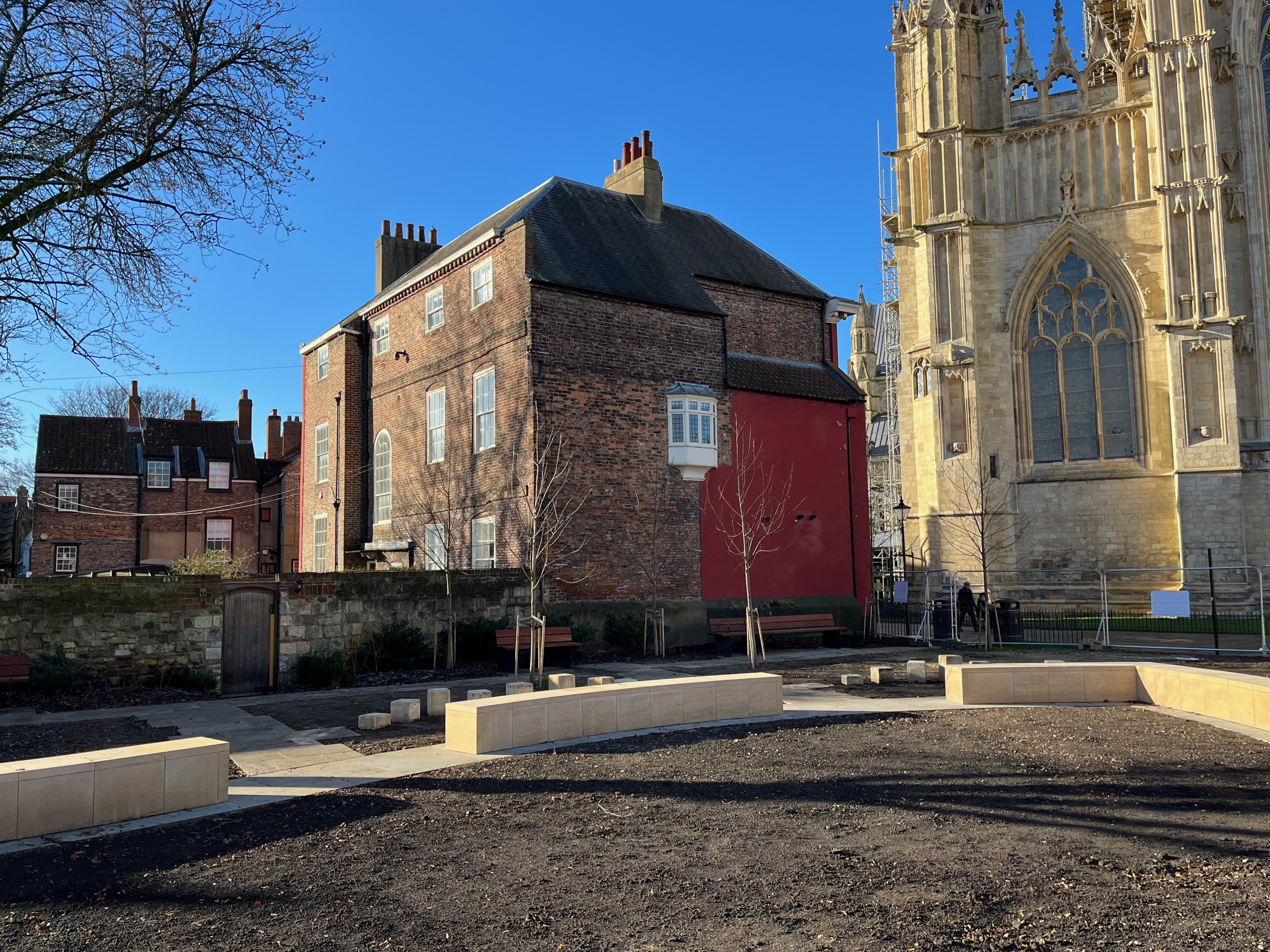
The eastern and southern elevations of the building, showing its proximity to the Minster

== See also ==
- Grade II* listed buildings in the City of York
- Listed buildings in York (within the city walls, northern part)
