= 11 Minster Yard and 3–9 Minster Gates =

Listed terrace in York, England

- The terrace in 2024

General information
- Location: Minster Yard and Minster Gates, York, England
- Coordinates: 53.961715°N 1.08225910°W
- Year built: Early 18th century
- Renovated: Early 19th century (altered, shopfronts)

Design and construction
- Designations

Listed Building – Grade II
- Official name: 11 Minster Yard, 3–9 Minster Gates
- Designated: 14 June 1954
- Reference no.: 1257246

9 Minster Gates (left) and 11 Minster Yard

11 Minster Yard and 3–9 Minster Gates is a historic building on the corner of Minster Yard and Minster Gates in the city of York, England. A Grade II listed terrace dating from the early 18th century, it was built as five houses and now contains three shops, with later alterations including early 19th‑century shopfronts and further changes later in the century.

== Architecture ==
The front uses orange‑brown brick; the rear has simpler brickwork. Timber is used for the door surrounds, shopfronts and roof edging. The hipped roof is tiled at the front and pantiled at the back, with brick chimneys and small gabled attic windows containing two‑part horizontal sashes. The building has three storeys with cellars and attics. The Minster Gates side has six windows; the Minster Yard side has three.

Nos. 3 and 5 have matching plain shopfronts with part‑glazed doors and large‑pane windows over louvred bases. Nos. 7 and 9 have shallow square bay shopfronts that continue onto Minster Yard, with small roofs, small‑pane or later large‑pane windows over boarded bases, and glazed panelled doors with small‑pane overlights.

On the first floor, five front windows have 16 panes and one has 12 with an iron guard. On the second floor, five have 12 panes and one has 16. All have narrow painted sills and shallow brick heads, mostly hidden by a deep cornice. A raised brick band at second‑floor level continues onto Minster Yard.

The Minster Yard side has a pilastered doorway with a cornice, a six‑panel door and divided overlight, with a 12‑pane sash beside it. First‑floor windows here have 16 panes; second‑floor windows have 12 panes, two blind. The cornice from the Minster Gates front returns around this elevation.

== See also ==
- 2–8 Minster Gates, a Grade II‑listed terrace opposite Nos. 3–9
- Listed buildings in York (within the city walls, northern part)
