= 7 Minster Yard =

Listed building in York, England

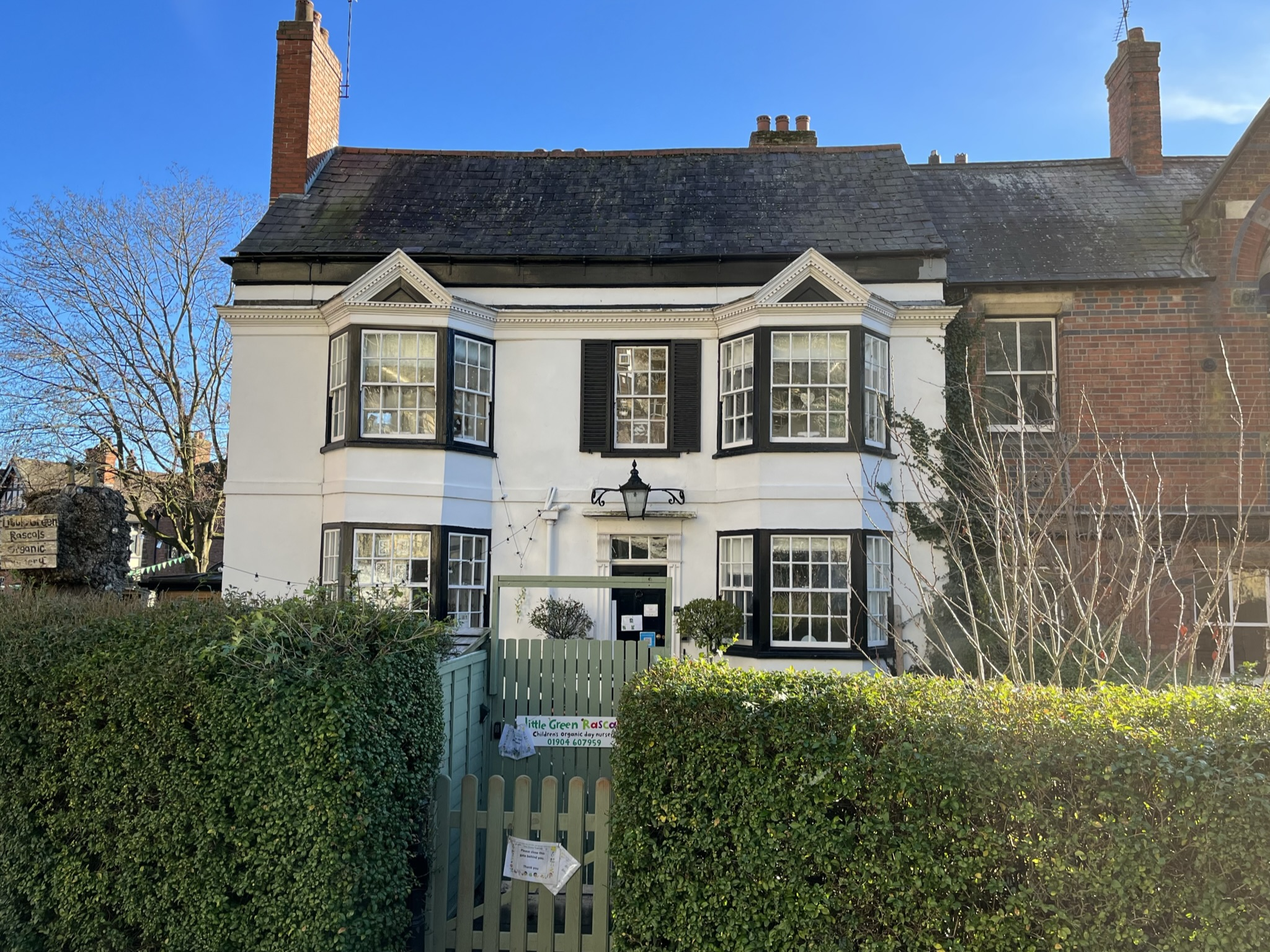
- The building in 2023
- Interactive map of the 7 Minster Yard area

General information
- Location: Minster Yard, York, England
- Coordinates: 53.961833°N 1.08082320°W
- Completed: c. 1730; 296 years ago
- Renovated: Early 19th century (front range altered)

Listed Building – Grade II
- Official name: 7, Minster Yard
- Designated: 18 November 1977
- Reference no.: 1257257

7 Minster Yard is a historic building on Minster Yard in the city of York, England. A Grade II listed building, it dates from around 1730. It was formerly part of the prebendal house of Strensall.

The front is two storeys with two canted and pedimented bay windows on each floor. These, and the central door-case, date to the early 1800s.

The property adjoins 1 Deangate.

== See also ==
- Listed buildings in York (within the city walls, northern part)
