= 40 Low Petergate and 2–8 Minster Gates =

Listed building in York, England

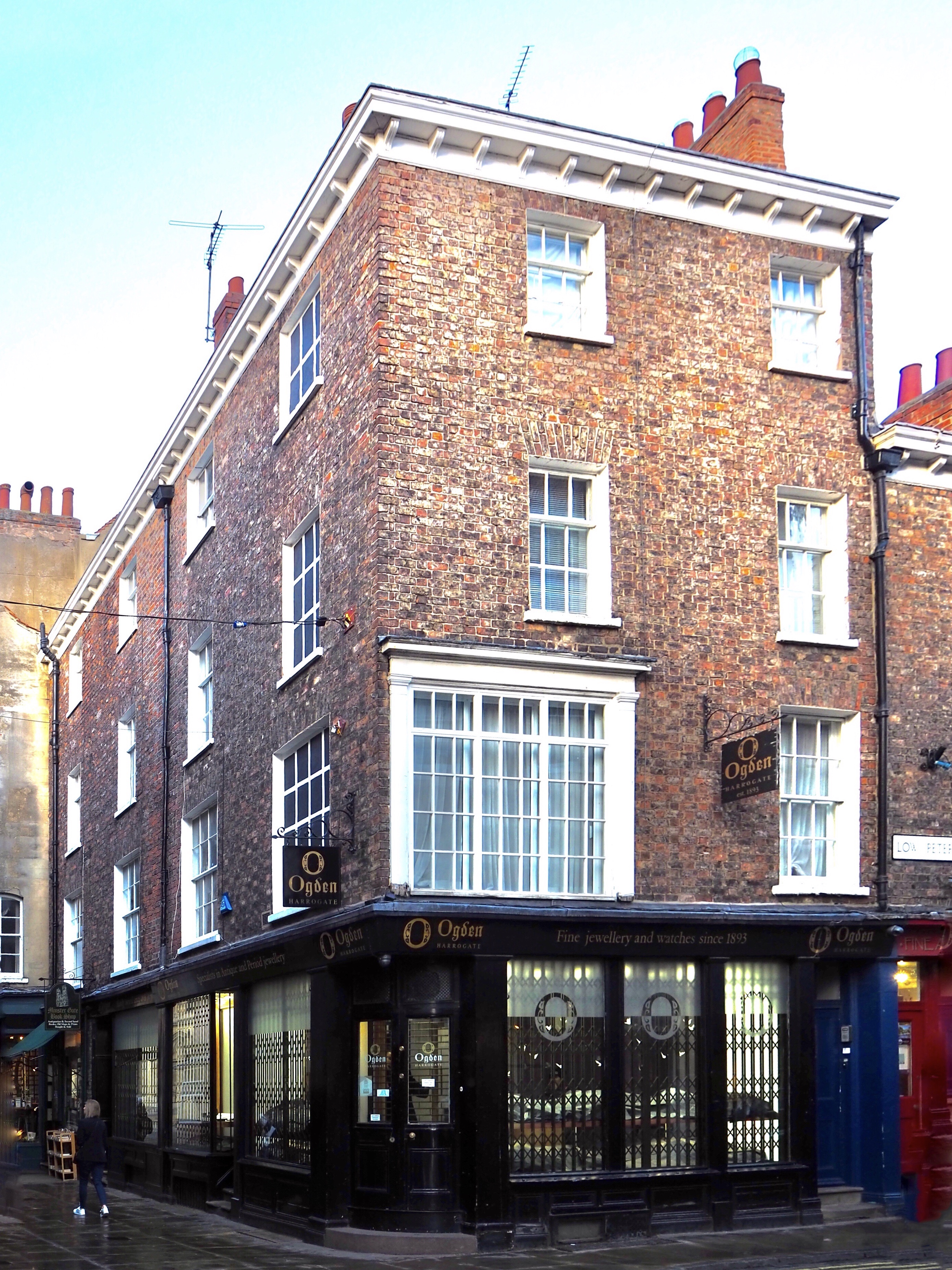
- 2–8 Minster Gates (left) and 40 Low Petergate (centre) in 2023

- Location within York City Centre

General information
- Location: Low Petergate and Minster Gates, York, England
- Coordinates: 53.9615633°N 1.0822128°W
- Year built: c. 1840 (186 years ago)

Design and construction
- Designations

Listed Building – Grade II
- Official name: 40, Low Petergate, 2–8 Minster Gates
- Designated: 1 July 1968
- Reference no.: 1257245

40 Low Petergate and 2–8 Minster Gates form a Grade II listed building on the corner of Low Petergate and Minster Gates in the city of York, England. Dating from around 1840, the structure comprises a terrace of three houses and shops set back from the neighbouring 10 Minster Gates, which pre-dates it by just under a century, exposing its southern gable end. Although the ground‑floor premises are addressed as 2–6 Minster Gates, the upper floors are known as 40 Low Petergate. Historic England treats the whole range as one entity, with No. 40 physically forming part of the same mid‑19th‑century terrace. The terrace stands on the site of an earlier No. 8, which was demolished before the present building was constructed. Nos. 2–6 are now occupied by the jeweller Olivia Green, while No. 8 is the premises of The Minster Gate Bookshop.

== Architecture ==
Entrance detail of No. 2–6 (2026)

The building is made of orange‑grey brick with a timber shopfront and timber guttering, and has a hipped pantile roof with brick chimneys and a rooflight facing Petergate.

It has four storeys, with four windows on the Minster Gates side and two on the Low Petergate side. On Minster Gates, No. 2 has a shopfront, and No. 4 has a renewed front with a large window and curved glazed double doors with a small window above at the corner. Nos. 6 and 8 keep their original door and window frames, with recessed glazed and panelled doors and bordered overlights set back within plain surrounds. No. 6 has a large window above a panelled base, while No. 8 has a similar window set into a partly filled‑in opening. The first‑floor windows are 16‑pane sashes; the second floor has uneven 9‑pane sashes, with one blind window at the right end on both floors. The top floor has two uneven 9‑pane sashes and two short 6‑pane sashes. All upper windows have painted stone sills and flat brick heads, with those on the top floor hidden behind guttering carried on shaped brackets. A rainwater head between Nos. 4 and 6 is marked with crossed keys.

On Low Petergate, the shopfront continues around the corner and includes a four‑panel door with an overlight at the right end. The first floor has a three‑light window with top‑hung openings in a simple surround of pilasters and a cornice. Other windows include a 12‑pane sash to the right on the first floor, and uneven 9‑pane sashes on the second and third floors, with the top‑floor ones being short.

== See also ==
- 3–9 Minster Gates, a Grade II‑listed terrace opposite Nos. 2–8
- Listed buildings in York (within the city walls, northern part)
