= John Fountayne =

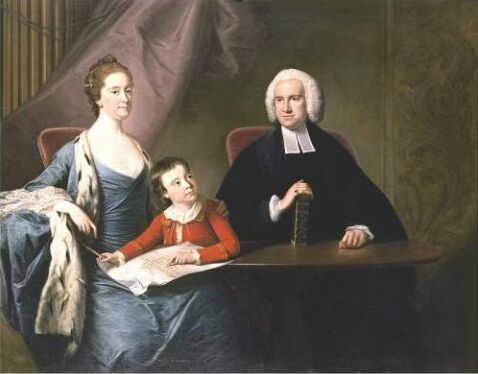
Rev Dr Fountayne with his third wife, Ann, and their son Thomas. Portrait by Bernard Downes

John Fountayne (1714–1802) was a Church of England clergyman and the longest serving Dean of York.

== Life ==
Fountayne was the younger of two sons of John Fountayne. He was raised at Melton Hall, in High Melton, the family seat which he inherited upon the death of his elder brother in 1739 and which he immediately set about substantially rebuilding.

He graduated M.A. from St Catharine's College, Cambridge, in 1739 and was later awarded a Doctorship of Divinity from the same college in 1751.

Having served as prebendary of Salisbury Cathedral from his graduation, he was first appointed a Canon at St. George's Chapel, Windsor, in 1741, and was later preferred as Dean of York, a position which he held from 1747 to his death in February 1802.

Noted as quite a politically astute Dean, he held on to office by moving with the political wind, as recounted by his friend, the author, Laurence Sterne.

== Marriages ==
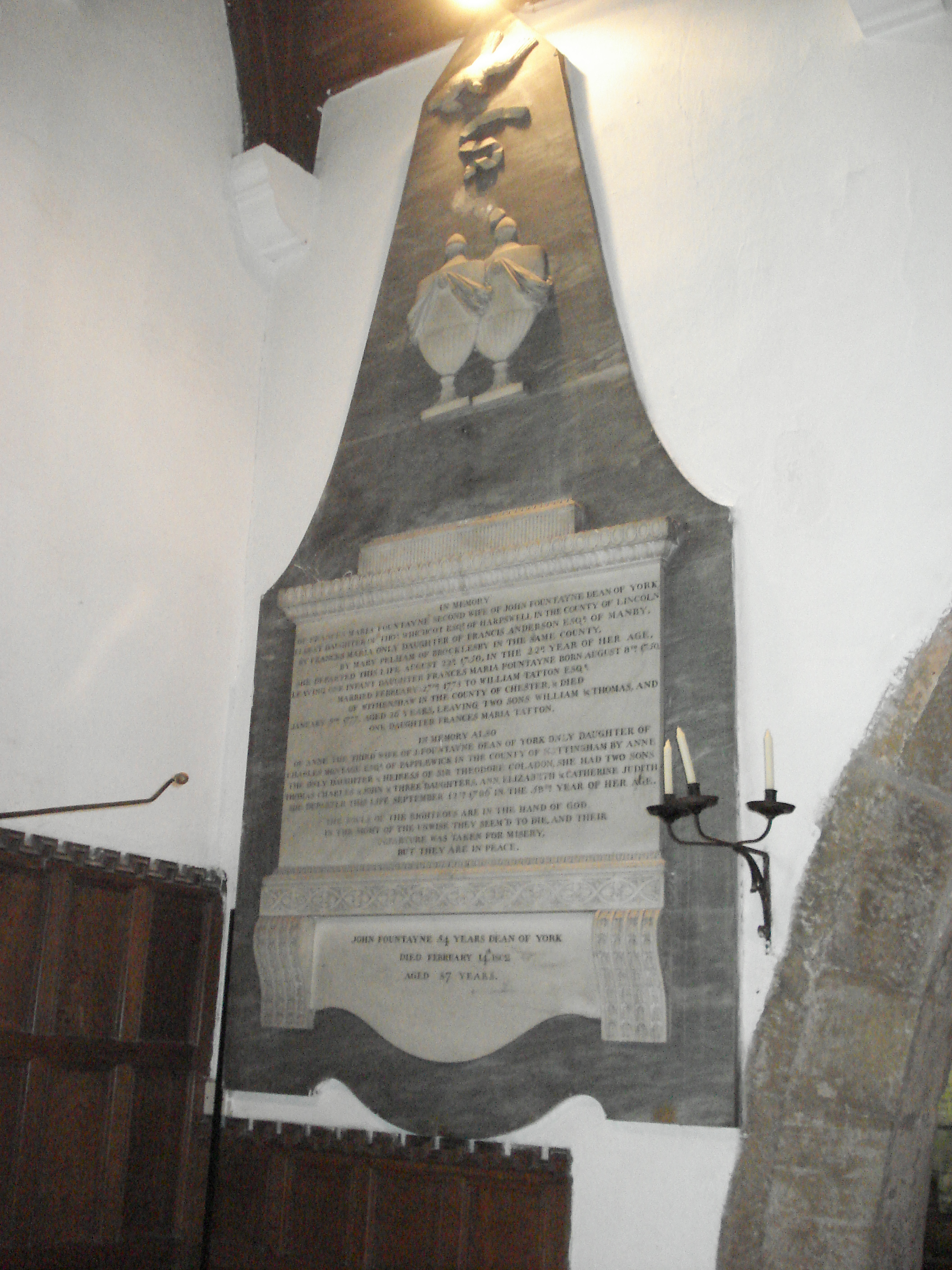
Memorial to Fountayne and his second and third wives near the altar of St James' Church, High Melton. The inscription to John Fountayne can be seen alone at the base of the memorial.

John Fountayne married three times, firstly to Ann Bromley, daughter of William Bromley, speaker of the House of Commons, in 1744 and by whom he had no issue. Following Ann's death in 1746, he married Frances Maria Whichcote, of Harpswell, Lincolnshire, by whom he had one daughter, also named Frances Maria.

Upon Frances' death in 1750, he thirdly married Ann Montagu, in 1754, the only daughter of Charles Montagu of Papplewick, Nottinghamshire. This marriage produced two sons and three daughters, all of whom the except the middle daughter died unmarried. There are memorials to all these family members in Melton Church.

The second daughter from this third marriage married Richard Wilson, second son of Christopher Wilson, sometime Bishop of Bristol. As a result of this marriage, the family name was changed to Fountayne-Wilson and later reverted to Montagu, following an inheritance.

== Burial ==
He is buried in St James' Church, High Melton, the parish church of his family estate in South Yorkshire, a building in which he erected several substantial family memorials and installed much of the church's stained glass. His own memorial stands to the south of the altar, below which the Fountayne family vault is sealed.

Fountayne's heir was his only surviving grandson, Richard Fountayne-Wilson, son of his daughter Elizabeth, who became Member of Parliament for Yorkshire between 1826 and 1830 and High Sheriff of Yorkshire 1807–08.

== See also ==
- 10 Minster Gates, built in 1755 for Fountayne and leased to William Darwin, the verger
