= High Melton =

Village and civil parish in South Yorkshire, England

Coordinates: 53.5118°N 1.2343°W

- Village
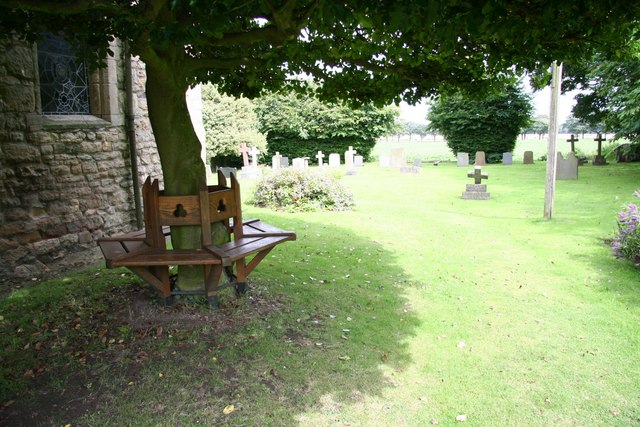
- St James' churchyard

- Location within the City of Doncaster Location within South Yorkshire
- Area: 6.49 km^{2} (2.51 sq mi)
- Population: 300 (2011)
  - Density: 46/km^{2} (120/sq mi)
  - London: 146 mi (235 km) SSE
- Civil parish: High Melton
- Metropolitan borough: City of Doncaster
- Metropolitan county: South Yorkshire
- Region: Yorkshire and the Humber
- Country: England
- Sovereign state: United Kingdom
- Post town: Doncaster
- Postcode district: DN5
- Dialling code: 01302
- Police: South Yorkshire
- Fire: South Yorkshire
- Ambulance: Yorkshire
- UK Parliament: Doncaster North

High Melton is a village and civil parish in the City of Doncaster in South Yorkshire, England. It had a population of 339 in 2001, reducing to 300 at the 2011 Census.

== History ==
In August 2019, 13 men and women fell ill after accidentally ingesting cannabis concealed in cakes during a national festival for metal detectorists called 'Coil to the Soil'.

== See also ==
- Listed buildings in High Melton
