= Listed buildings in York (outside the city walls, northern part) =

York is a city in the City of York district, within the ceremonial county of North Yorkshire, England. It contains 65 Grade I, 161 Grade II*, and 1,004 Grade II listed buildings recorded in the National Heritage List for England.

This list is based on information retrieved from Historic England.

Because York has a large number of listed buildings, the subject is divided into geographically defined lists. This list covers all listed buildings outside the city walls north and northeast of the inner city.

== Key ==
| Grade | Criteria |
|---|---|
| I | Buildings that are of exceptional interest |
| II* | Particularly important buildings of more than special interest |
| II | Buildings that are of special interest |

== Buildings ==
=== St Mary's Abbey Precinct ===
| Name | Grade | Location | Type | Completed (Note: The date given is the date used by Historic England as significant for the initial building or that of an important part in the structure's description.) | Date designated | Grid ref. (Note: The grid reference is based on the British national grid reference system, sometimes known as OSGB36, used by the Ordnance Survey.) Geo-coordinates | Entry number (Note: The "List Entry Number" is a unique number assigned to each listed building and scheduled monument by Historic England.) | Image | Wikidata |
|---|---|---|---|---|---|---|---|---|---|
| Multangular Tower and wall attached to south east | I | Museum Gardens | Tower | c. 300 | 14 June 1954 | SE6001252072; 53°57′41″N 1°05′13″W | 1257120 | Multangular Tower and wall attached to south east More images | Q17530586 |
| Anglian Tower | I | Museum Gardens | Tower | 7th century (probable) | 14 June 1954 | SE6004552135; 53°57′43″N 1°05′11″W | 1257157 | Anglian Tower More images | Q4763423 |
| St Mary's Lodge and attached railings, gates and gate piers | I | Museum Gardens | Gatehouse | Late 12th century | 14 June 1954 | SE5983752159; 53°57′43″N 1°05′22″W | 1257136 | St Mary's Lodge and attached railings, gates and gate piers More images | Q67600995 |
| City Wall from Lendall Hill House to the Lodge | I | Museum Gardens, City Walls | Wall | 1250–1270; 1874 (partly rebuilt) | 14 June 1954 | SE6001452008; 53°57′38″N 1°05′13″W | 1259290 | City Wall from Lendall Hill House to the Lodge More images | Q17530643 |
| Wall approximately 5 metres north east of the King's Manor | I | Exhibition Square | Wall | c. 1266 | 24 June 1983 | SE6006452195; 53°57′44″N 1°05′10″W | 1257859 | Wall approximately 5 metres north east of the King's Manor More images | Q17530631 |
| St Mary's Abbey remains: precinct walls, St Mary's Tower | I | Museum Gardens | Wall | 1266 | 14 June 1954 | SE5998352340; 53°57′49″N 1°05′14″W | 1257131 | St Mary's Abbey remains: precinct walls, St Mary's Tower More images | Q17530591 |
| St Mary's Abbey remains: church | I | Museum Gardens | Ruins | 1270–1294 | 14 June 1954 | SE5993652174; 53°57′44″N 1°05′17″W | 1257128 | St Mary's Abbey remains: church More images | Q1426965 |
| St Mary's Abbey remains: hospitium and watergate | II* | Museum Gardens | House | 14th century | 14 June 1954 | SE5984652065; 53°57′40″N 1°05′22″W | 1257129 | St Mary's Abbey remains: hospitium and watergate More images | Q17549637 |
| Church of St Olave | I | Marygate | Church | Late 15th century | 14 June 1954 | SE5986452186; 53°57′44″N 1°05′21″W | 1257387 | Church of St Olave More images | Q7594998 |
| The King's Manor | I | Exhibition Square | House | 1483–1502 (rebuilt) | 14 June 1954 | SE6000452127; 53°57′42″N 1°05′13″W | 1257855 | The King's Manor More images | Q6411006 |
| Yorkshire Museum, Tempest Anderson Hall and St Mary's Abbey remains | I | Museum Gardens | Museum | 1827–1829 | 14 June 1954 | SE5996552135; 53°57′43″N 1°05′15″W | 1257100 | Yorkshire Museum, Tempest Anderson Hall and St Mary's Abbey remains More images | Q67601241 |
| Observatory | II | Museum Gardens | Observatory | 1832–33 | 2 November 1972 | SE5993552066; 53°57′40″N 1°05′17″W | 1257124 | Observatory More images | Q26548529 |
| Former waterworks engine house at rear of Lendal Hill House | II | Museum Street | Engine house | 1836 | 24 June 1983 | SE5998451988; 53°57′38″N 1°05′14″W | 1257085 | Former waterworks engine house at rear of Lendal Hill House More images | Q26548496 |
| Curator's House | II | Museum Gardens | House | 1844 | 2 November 1972 | SE5999952122; 53°57′42″N 1°05′13″W | 1257117 | Curator's House More images | Q26548523 |
| Railings and gates forming south west boundary of Museum Gardens | II | Museum Gardens | Railings | 1844 | 31 January 1973 | SE5976952051; 53°57′40″N 1°05′26″W | 1257125 | Railings and gates forming south west boundary of Museum Gardens More images | Q26548530 |
| Etty's tomb approximately 25 metres south east of St Olave's Church | II | Marygate | Tomb | 1849 | 24 June 1983 | SE5988752156; 53°57′43″N 1°05′19″W | 1257350 | Etty's tomb approximately 25 metres south east of St Olave's Church More images | Q26548714 |
| County House | II | 32 Monkgate | Hospital | 1849–1851 | 1 July 1968 | SE6074052254; 53°57′46″N 1°04′33″W | 1257202 | County House More images | Q26548601 |
| Wall, railings and lamp standards approximately 3 metres north of St Olave's Church | II | Marygate | Wall | Mid-19th century (probable) | 14 March 1997 | SE5985252193; 53°57′45″N 1°05′21″W | 1257351 | Wall, railings and lamp standards approximately 3 metres north of St Olave's Church More images | Q26548715 |
| The Lodge and attached gates and gate piers | II | Museum Gardens | Lodge | 1874 | 2 November 1972 | SE6002552018; 53°57′39″N 1°05′12″W | 1257098 | The Lodge and attached gates and gate piers More images | Q26548505 |
| City Art Gallery | II | Exhibition Square | Art gallery | 1878–79 | 1 July 1968 | SE6004252264; 53°57′47″N 1°05′11″W | 1257852 | City Art Gallery More images | Q8055361 |
| Headmaster's House | II | Exhibition Square | House | 1899 | 24 June 1983 | SE6003652230; 53°57′46″N 1°05′11″W | 1257853 | Headmaster's House More images | Q26549170 |
| Railings and gates fronting forecourt of the King's Manor | II | Exhibition Square | Railings | c. 1900 (probable) | 24 June 1983 | SE6006452227; 53°57′46″N 1°05′10″W | 1257857 | Railings and gates fronting forecourt of the King's Manor More images | Q26549173 |
| Statue of William Etty | II | Exhibition Square | Statue | 1911 | 24 June 1983 | SE6007352240; 53°57′46″N 1°05′09″W | 1257854 | Statue of William Etty More images | Q26549171 |

=== Suburbs ===
| Name | Grade | Location | Type | Completed | Date designated | Grid ref. Geo-coordinates | Entry number | Image | Wikidata |
|---|---|---|---|---|---|---|---|---|---|
| The Burton Stone adjacent to the Burton Stone Inn | II | Clifton | Cross base | Medieval | 14 June 1954 | SE5960252719; 53°58′02″N 1°05′35″W | 1259198 | The Burton Stone adjacent to the Burton Stone Inn More images | Q26550339 |
| Whitestone Cross at grid reference NGR SE 6073 5367 | II | Haxby Road | Boundary stone | Medieval | 24 June 1983 | SE6072653665; 53°58′32″N 1°04′32″W | 1257676 | Whitestone Cross at grid reference NGR SE 6073 5367 More images | Q26549011 |
| Ingram House | II* | 90 Bootham | House | 1630–1632 | 14 June 1954 | SE5977652530; 53°57′55″N 1°05′25″W | 1259395 | Ingram House More images | Q15228684 |
| 21 and 23 Bootham | II | | House | Late 17th century | 1 July 1968 | SE6008152296; 53°57′48″N 1°05′09″W | 1259476 | 21 and 23 Bootham More images | Q26550585 |
| Number 49 and attached railings | II* | Bootham | House | Late 17th century | 14 June 1954 | SE5997452386; 53°57′51″N 1°05′14″W | 1259465 | Number 49 and attached railings More images | Q17550076 |
| 64 and 66 Clifton | II* | | House | Late 17th century | 14 June 1954 | SE5952752832; 53°58′05″N 1°05′39″W | 1259226 | 64 and 66 Clifton More images | Q17550026 |
| The Old Grey Mare public house | II | Clifton Green | Public house | Late 17th century | 1 July 1968 | SE5937752921; 53°58′08″N 1°05′47″W | 1259205 | The Old Grey Mare public house More images | Q26550346 |
| 28 Marygate | II | | House | Late 17th century | 24 June 1983 | SE5988752248; 53°57′46″N 1°05′19″W | 1257373 | 28 Marygate More images | Q26548736 |
| St Olave's House | II | 48 Marygate | House | Late 17th century | 14 March 1997 | SE5983352202; 53°57′45″N 1°05′22″W | 1257381 | St Olave's House More images | Q26548743 |
| 8, 10 and 12 Water End | II | | House | Late 17th century (No. 8); late 18th century (Nos. 10 and 12) | 1 July 1968 | SE5919652995; 53°58′11″N 1°05′57″W | 1256262 | 8, 10 and 12 Water End More images | Q26547793 |
| 64 Gillygate | II | | House | c. 1700 | 24 June 1983 | SE6022952426; 53°57′52″N 1°05′00″W | 1257786 | 64 Gillygate More images | Q26549111 |
| Middleton House | II* | 38 Monkgate | House | c. 1700 | 14 June 1954 | SE6070352343; 53°57′49″N 1°04′34″W | 1257207 | Middleton House More images | Q17549641 |
| The Garth | II | 60 Marygate | School | 1705 | 19 August 1971 | SE5980052160; 53°57′43″N 1°05′24″W | 1257382 | The Garth More images | Q26548744 |
| Monkgate House | II | 44 Monkgate | House | c. 1723 | 14 June 1954 | SE6072152365; 53°57′50″N 1°04′33″W | 1257217 | Monkgate House More images | Q26548614 |
| 12 and 12A Gillygate | II | | House | Early 18th century | 14 June 1954 | SE6014252301; 53°57′48″N 1°05′05″W | 1257780 | 12 and 12A Gillygate More images | Q26549106 |
| The White House | II | 10 Clifton | House | Early 18th century | 20 August 1970 | SE5972152640; 53°57′59″N 1°05′28″W | 1259249 | The White House More images | Q26681848 |
| Almery Garth and Little Garth | II | Marygate Lane | House | Early 18th century | 14 June 1954 | SE5978852176; 53°57′44″N 1°05′25″W | 1257353 | Almery Garth and Little Garth More images | Q26548717 |
| 40 Monkgate | II | | House | Early 18th century | 14 June 1954 | SE6071052354; 53°57′49″N 1°04′34″W | 1257210 | 40 Monkgate More images | Q26548607 |
| 36 Clifton | II | | House | c. 1740 | 14 June 1954 | SE5958952742; 53°58′02″N 1°05′35″W | 1259222 | 36 Clifton More images | Q26550362 |
| Wandesford House | II* | 37 Bootham | House | 1743 | 14 June 1954 | SE6002452368; 53°57′50″N 1°05′12″W | 1259452 | Wandesford House More images | Q7967249 |
| Numbers 39 and 43 and attached railings | II | Bootham | House | 1748 | 14 June 1954 | SE6000052362; 53°57′50″N 1°05′13″W | 1259455 | Numbers 39 and 43 and attached railings More images | Q26550567 |
| 23 and 25 Gillygate | II | | House | 18th century | 14 June 1954 | SE6013452330; 53°57′49″N 1°05′06″W | 1257781 | 23 and 25 Gillygate More images | Q26549107 |
| 8 and 10 Bootham | II | | House | Mid-18th century | 24 June 1983 | SE6005852284; 53°57′47″N 1°05′10″W | 1259471 | 8 and 10 Bootham More images | Q26550580 |
| 35 Bootham | II | | House | Mid-18th century | 14 June 1954 | SE6002852341; 53°57′49″N 1°05′12″W | 1259481 | 35 Bootham More images | Q26550590 |
| 59 Bootham | II | | House | Mid-18th century | 14 June 1954 | SE5992052438; 53°57′52″N 1°05′17″W | 1259439 | 59 Bootham More images | Q26550553 |
| 70 Heworth Village | II | Heworth | Inn | Mid-18th century | 24 June 1983 | SE6205352691; 53°58′00″N 1°03′20″W | 1257644 | 70 Heworth Village More images | Q26548979 |
| 33 Bootham | II | | House | 1752–1755 | 14 June 1954 | SE6003752334; 53°57′49″N 1°05′11″W | 1259480 | 33 Bootham More images | Q26550589 |
| Number 47 and attached railings | II* | Bootham | House | 1753 | 14 June 1954 | SE5998452381; 53°57′51″N 1°05′14″W | 1259463 | Number 47 and attached railings More images | Q17550070 |
| 57 Bootham | II | | House | c. 1759 | 1 July 1968 | SE5992852427; 53°57′52″N 1°05′17″W | 1259438 | 57 Bootham More images | Q26550552 |
| 40 and 42 Marygate | II | | House | c. 1760 | 19 August 1971 | SE5986252224; 53°57′46″N 1°05′21″W | 1257378 | 40 and 42 Marygate More images | Q26548740 |
| Numbers 53 and 55 and attached railings | II* | Bootham | House | c. 1765 | 14 June 1954 | SE5994252413; 53°57′52″N 1°05′16″W | 1259432 | Numbers 53 and 55 and attached railings More images | Q17550047 |
| 66 Gillygate | II | | House | c. 1765 | 14 June 1954 | SE6023252432; 53°57′52″N 1°05′00″W | 1257788 | 66 Gillygate More images | Q26549113 |
| 25 Bootham | II | | House | 1766 | 19 August 1971 | SE6007152306; 53°57′48″N 1°05′09″W | 1259477 | 25 Bootham More images | Q26550586 |
| 26 and 28 Gillygate | II* | | House | 1769 | 14 June 1954 | SE6016452331; 53°57′49″N 1°05′04″W | 1257782 | 26 and 28 Gillygate More images | Q17549902 |
| 70 Gillygate | II | | House | c. 1770 | 19 August 1971 | SE6024452451; 53°57′53″N 1°05′00″W | 1257747 | 70 Gillygate More images | Q26549073 |
| 46 Monkgate | II | | House | c. 1770 | 24 June 1983 | SE6072652369; 53°57′50″N 1°04′33″W | 1257179 | 46 Monkgate More images | Q26548577 |
| 48 Monkgate | II | | House | c. 1770 | 19 August 1971 | SE6073052373; 53°57′50″N 1°04′33″W | 1257180 | 48 Monkgate More images | Q26548578 |
| 75 and 77 Bootham | II | | House | 1770 | 14 June 1954 | SE5976752581; 53°57′57″N 1°05′26″W | 1259410 | 75 and 77 Bootham More images | Q26550526 |
| Bootham Park Hospital | I | Bootham | Hospital | 1773–1777 | 24 June 1983 | SE6011152806; 53°58′04″N 1°05′07″W | 1259396 | Bootham Park Hospital More images | Q4943909 |
| Two long corridors, recreation hall, former American bowling alley, and two former pauper wards, Bootham Park Hospital | II | Bootham | Hospital | 1773–1777 | 6 April 2016 | SE6008152827; 53°58′05″N 1°05′08″W | 1434284 | Upload Photo | Q26678009 |
| Exhibition Hotel | II | 19 Bootham | House | Late 18th century | 24 June 1983 | SE6009152294; 53°57′48″N 1°05′08″W | 1259474 | Exhibition Hotel More images | Q26550583 |
| Bootham House | II | 61 Bootham | House | Late 18th century | 14 June 1954 | SE5991152443; 53°57′53″N 1°05′18″W | 1259441 | Bootham House More images | Q26550555 |
| 38 and 40 Gillygate | II | | House | Late 18th century | 14 March 1997 | SE6018752365; 53°57′50″N 1°05′03″W | 1257783 | 38 and 40 Gillygate More images | Q26549108 |
| 68 Gillygate | II | | House | Late 18th century | 14 March 1997 | SE6023752438; 53°57′52″N 1°05′00″W | 1257746 | 68 Gillygate More images | Q26549072 |
| Number 29 and walls attached to south west | II* | Marygate | House | Late 18th century | 14 June 1954 | SE5987552218; 53°57′45″N 1°05′20″W | 1257374 | Number 29 and walls attached to south west More images | Q17549767 |
| St Mary's Cottage | II | 62 Marygate | House | Late 18th century | 19 August 1971 | SE5979252159; 53°57′43″N 1°05′25″W | 1257384 | St Mary's Cottage More images | Q26548746 |
| The Bay Horse public house | II | 4 Monkgate | Public house | Late 18th century | 19 August 1971 | SE6058752245; 53°57′46″N 1°04′41″W | 1257238 | The Bay Horse public house More images | Q26548633 |
| Ice house approximately 25 metres to rear of number 4 The Bay Horse public house | II | Monkgate | Ice house | Late 18th century (probable) | 24 June 1983 | SE6059852214; 53°57′45″N 1°04′40″W | 1257239 | Ice house approximately 25 metres to rear of number 4 The Bay Horse public house More images | Q26548634 |
| 42 and 44 Clifton | II | | House | c. 1780 | 14 June 1954 | SE5958052756; 53°58′03″N 1°05′36″W | 1259224 | 42 and 44 Clifton More images | Q26550364 |
| 8 Clifton | II | | House | 1782–1784 | 14 June 1954 | SE5972852613; 53°57′58″N 1°05′28″W | 1259248 | 8 Clifton More images | Q26550387 |
| 97 Heworth Village | II | Heworth | House | c. 1790 | 19 August 1971 | SE6214452790; 53°58′03″N 1°03′15″W | 1257645 | 97 Heworth Village More images | Q26548980 |
| Rockingham House | II | 25 Jewbury | House | 1792 | 24 June 1983 | SE6069052186; 53°57′44″N 1°04′35″W | 1257553 | Rockingham House More images | Q26548895 |
| 39 Monkgate | II | | House | 1794 | 14 June 1954 | SE6069852415; 53°57′51″N 1°04′35″W | 1257208 | 39 Monkgate More images | Q26548606 |
| 36 Monkgate | II | | House | 1796–1798 | 14 June 1954 | SE6069152340; 53°57′49″N 1°04′35″W | 1257204 | 36 Monkgate More images | Q26548603 |
| 3 and 5 Gillygate | II | | House | 1797 | 14 June 1954 | SE6010752290; 53°57′48″N 1°05′07″W | 1257779 | 3 and 5 Gillygate More images | Q26549105 |
| 14 and 16 Clifton | II | | House | c. 1800 | 14 June 1954 | SE5969452659; 53°58′00″N 1°05′30″W | 1259251 | 14 and 16 Clifton More images | Q26550390 |
| 68 and 70 Clifton | II | | House | c. 1800 | 14 March 1997 | SE5952152841; 53°58′06″N 1°05′39″W | 1259227 | 68 and 70 Clifton More images | Q26550366 |
| 32 and 34 Marygate | II | | House | c. 1800 | 19 August 1971 | SE5987652238; 53°57′46″N 1°05′20″W | 1257376 | 32 and 34 Marygate More images | Q26548738 |
| Number 51 and Bootham School block to rear including John Bright Library and attached railings | II* | Bootham | House | 1804 | 14 June 1954 | SE5996952435; 53°57′52″N 1°05′15″W | 1259468 | Number 51 and Bootham School block to rear including John Bright Library and attached railings More images | Q17550084 |
| 55 Monkgate | II | | House | c. 1812 | 14 June 1954 | SE6074952455; 53°57′53″N 1°04′32″W | 1257182 | 55 Monkgate More images | Q26548580 |
| 19 and 21 Monkgate | II | | House | 1812 | 14 June 1954 | SE6063052333; 53°57′49″N 1°04′39″W | 1257240 | 19 and 21 Monkgate More images | Q26548635 |
| 67 and 69 Monkgate | II | | House | 1812–1814 | 19 August 1971 | SE6079452481; 53°57′53″N 1°04′29″W | 1257190 | 67 and 69 Monkgate More images | Q26548588 |
| St Olave's House (St Olave's School) | II | Clifton | House | 1813 | 24 June 1983 | SE5947952703; 53°58′01″N 1°05′41″W | 1259233 | Upload Photo | Q26550372 |
| Sparrow Cottage | II | 58 Heworth Village, Heworth | House | c. 1815 | 24 June 1983 | SE6200352666; 53°57′59″N 1°03′23″W | 1257643 | Sparrow Cottage More images | Q26548978 |
| Walls, railings and gates to numbers 27–49 (odd) (Grove Terrace) | II | Huntington Road | Wall | c. 1824 | 14 March 1997 | SE6094052811; 53°58′04″N 1°04′21″W | 1257549 | Upload Photo | Q26548891 |
| Grove Terrace | II | 27–49 Huntington Road | House | 1824 | 24 June 1983 | SE6090952818; 53°58′04″N 1°04′23″W | 1257548 | Grove Terrace More images | Q26548890 |
| 40 Bootham | II | | House | Early 19th century | 24 June 1983 | SE5999852333; 53°57′49″N 1°05′13″W | 1259459 | 40 Bootham More images | Q26550571 |
| Number 52 and attached railings | II | Bootham | House | Early 19th century | 19 August 1971 | SE5994052375; 53°57′50″N 1°05′16″W | 1259430 | Number 52 and attached railings More images | Q26550546 |
| 67 and 69 Bootham | II | | House | Early 19th century | 19 August 1971 | SE5978552559; 53°57′56″N 1°05′25″W | 1259406 | 67 and 69 Bootham More images | Q26550522 |
| 71 and 73 Bootham | II | | House | Early 19th century | 19 August 1971 | SE5977452569; 53°57′57″N 1°05′25″W | 1259409 | 71 and 73 Bootham More images | Q26550525 |
| 84 Bootham | II | | House | Early 19th century | 24 June 1983 | SE5979952508; 53°57′55″N 1°05′24″W | 1259394 | 84 Bootham More images | Q26550513 |
| Number 2 and attached walls and railings | II | Clifton | House | c. 1825 | 14 June 1954 | SE5974852594; 53°57′58″N 1°05′27″W | 1259243 | Number 2 and attached walls and railings More images | Q26550382 |
| Number 4 and attached walls and railings | II | Clifton | House | c. 1825 | 19 August 1971 | SE5974352600; 53°57′58″N 1°05′27″W | 1259244 | Number 4 and attached walls and railings More images | Q26550383 |
| 40 Clifton | II | | House | Early 19th century | 14 June 1954 | SE5958452750; 53°58′03″N 1°05′36″W | 1259223 | 40 Clifton More images | Q26550363 |
| 65, 67 and 69 Gillygate | II | | House | Early 19th century | 7 May 1982 | SE6021452446; 53°57′53″N 1°05′01″W | 1257787 | 65, 67 and 69 Gillygate More images | Q26549112 |
| 84 and 86 Gillygate | II | | House | Early 19th century | 14 March 1997 | SE6025852480; 53°57′54″N 1°04′59″W | 1257748 | 84 and 86 Gillygate More images | Q26549074 |
| Summerhouse approximately 60 metres north of number 19 | II | Heworth Green, Heworth | Summerhouse | Early 19th century | 14 March 1997 | SE6101252674; 53°58′00″N 1°04′17″W | 1257652 | Summerhouse approximately 60 metres north of number 19 More images | Q26548987 |
| 24 Lord Mayor's Walk | II | | Shop | Early 19th century | 24 June 1983 | SE6051352341; 53°57′49″N 1°04′45″W | 1257457 | 24 Lord Mayor's Walk More images | Q26548808 |
| 26 Lord Mayor's Walk | II | | Shop | Early 19th century | 24 June 1983 | SE6050752345; 53°57′49″N 1°04′45″W | 1257458 | 26 Lord Mayor's Walk More images | Q26548809 |
| 32 Lord Mayor's Walk | II | | House | Early 19th century | 24 June 1983 | SE6049352358; 53°57′50″N 1°04′46″W | 1257462 | 32 Lord Mayor's Walk More images | Q26548813 |
| 34 Lord Mayor's Walk | II | | House | Early 19th century | 24 June 1983 | SE6048952362; 53°57′50″N 1°04′46″W | 1257463 | 34 Lord Mayor's Walk More images | Q26548814 |
| 30 Marygate | II | | House | Early 19th century | 14 June 1954 | SE5988252243; 53°57′46″N 1°05′20″W | 1257375 | 30 Marygate More images | Q26548737 |
| 36 and 38 Marygate | II | | House | Early 19th century | 24 June 1983 | SE5986952231; 53°57′46″N 1°05′20″W | 1257377 | 36 and 38 Marygate More images | Q26548739 |
| Gate, forecourt wall and railings to number 55 | II | Monkgate | Gate | Early 19th century | 19 August 1971 | SE6076252439; 53°57′52″N 1°04′31″W | 1257184 | Gate, forecourt wall and railings to number 55 More images | Q26548582 |
| 65 Monkgate | II | | House | Early 19th century | 14 March 1997 | SE6078652476; 53°57′53″N 1°04′30″W | 1257188 | 65 Monkgate More images | Q26548586 |
| Ellison Terrace | II | 2–6 Water End | House | Early 19th century | 1 July 1968 | SE5922453008; 53°58′11″N 1°05′55″W | 1256261 | Ellison Terrace More images | Q26547792 |
| The White House | II | 28 Water End | Public house | Early 19th century | 24 June 1983 | SE5913452961; 53°58′10″N 1°06′00″W | 1256263 | The White House More images | Q26547794 |
| Stone at NGR SE 6165 5307 | II | Monk Stray | Boundary stone | Early 19th century (possible) | 14 March 1997 | SE6166753073; 53°58′12″N 1°03′41″W | 1257234 | Stone at NGR SE 6165 5307 More images | Q26548629 |
| Stone at NGR SE 6168 5348 | II | Monk Stray | Boundary stone | Early 19th century (possible) | 14 March 1997 | SE6168153507; 53°58′26″N 1°03′40″W | 1257235 | Stone at NGR SE 6168 5348 More images | Q26548630 |
| The Churchill | II* | 65 Bootham | House | c. 1827 | 19 August 1971 | SE5981952562; 53°57′56″N 1°05′23″W | 1259444 | The Churchill More images | Q17550059 |
| 42 Monkgate | II | | House | 1828 | 24 June 1983 | SE6071652361; 53°57′50″N 1°04′34″W | 1257216 | 42 Monkgate More images | Q26548613 |
| 34 Clifton | II | | House | c. 1830 | 14 June 1954 | SE5959252733; 53°58′02″N 1°05′35″W | 1259221 | 34 Clifton More images | Q26550361 |
| Clifton Croft | II | Greencliffe Drive | House | c. 1830 | 24 June 1983 | SE5916952848; 53°58′06″N 1°05′58″W | 1257669 | Clifton Croft More images | Q26549004 |
| Clifton Lodge, Rawcliffe Holt | II | 1 Rawcliffe Lane | House | c. 1830 | 24 June 1983 | SE5913953240; 53°58′19″N 1°06′00″W | 1256836 | Clifton Lodge, Rawcliffe Holt | Q26548274 |
| Number 27 and attached walls and railings | II | Clifton | House | c. 1830–1840 | 19 August 1971 | SE5958852693; 53°58′01″N 1°05′35″W | 1259218 | Number 27 and attached walls and railings More images | Q26550358 |
| Numbers 45–51 (odd) and attached walls and railings | II | Monkgate | House | 1830–1840 | 24 June 1983 | SE6073652433; 53°57′52″N 1°04′33″W | 1257219 | Numbers 45–51 (odd) and attached walls and railings More images | Q26548616 |
| Number 11 and attached railings | II | Clifton | House | c. 1832 | 9 December 1988 | SE5970452584; 53°57′57″N 1°05′29″W | 1259250 | Number 11 and attached railings More images | Q26550389 |
| Gate standards, gates and railings to front of numbers 104 and 106 (106 not included) | II | Heworth Green, Heworth | Gate | Early to mid-19th century | 19 August 1971 | SE6148852768; 53°58′02″N 1°03′51″W | 1257638 | Gate standards, gates and railings to front of numbers 104 and 106 (106 not included) More images | Q26548973 |
| Song school of St Olave's School | II | 29 Clifton | House | c. 1835 | 24 June 1983 | SE5957552708; 53°58′01″N 1°05′36″W | 1259219 | Song school of St Olave's School More images | Q26550359 |
| 26 Heworth Green | II | Heworth | House | c. 1835 | 14 June 1954 | SE6112852597; 53°57′57″N 1°04′11″W | 1257653 | 26 Heworth Green More images | Q26548988 |
| 30 Monkgate | II | | House | c. 1835 | 24 June 1983 | SE6065152308; 53°57′48″N 1°04′37″W | 1257201 | 30 Monkgate More images | Q26548600 |
| 57 and 59 Monkgate | II | | House | c. 1835 | 24 June 1983 | SE6076352455; 53°57′53″N 1°04′31″W | 1257185 | 57 and 59 Monkgate More images | Q26548583 |
| 44 Heworth Green, 1 Mill Lane | II | Heworth | House | c. 1835–1840 | 24 June 1983 | SE6126052647; 53°57′59″N 1°04′04″W | 1257654 | 44 Heworth Green, 1 Mill Lane More images | Q26548989 |
| 16 Clifton Green | II | | House | c. 1836 | 24 June 1983 | SE5924852960; 53°58′10″N 1°05′54″W | 1259199 | 16 Clifton Green More images | Q26550340 |
| 26–32 Clifton | II | | House | 1836–1840 | 19 August 1971 | SE5962952715; 53°58′01″N 1°05′33″W | 1259255 | 26–32 Clifton More images | Q26550394 |
| Schoolhouse at St Peter's School | II | Clifton | School | 1838 | 14 June 1954 | SE5962652610; 53°57′58″N 1°05′33″W | 1259196 | Upload Photo | Q26550337 |
| Hall range and chapel at St Peter's School | II | Clifton | School hall | 1838 | 14 June 1954 | SE5961152623; 53°57′59″N 1°05′34″W | 1259235 | Hall range and chapel at St Peter's School More images | Q26550374 |
| 22 Clifton Green | II | | House | 1839 | 24 June 1983 | SE5926853056; 53°58′13″N 1°05′53″W | 1259200 | Upload Photo | Q26550341 |
| 23 Clifton Green | II | | House | 1839 | 24 June 1983 | SE5927653063; 53°58′13″N 1°05′52″W | 1259201 | Upload Photo | Q26550342 |
| 1 and 1A Bootham | II | | Shop | c. 1840 | 24 June 1983 | SE6012852252; 53°57′46″N 1°05′06″W | 1259511 | 1 and 1A Bootham More images | Q26550619 |
| 3 and 5 Bootham | II | | Shop | c. 1840 | 24 June 1983 | SE6011852257; 53°57′46″N 1°05′07″W | 1259470 | 3 and 5 Bootham More images | Q26550579 |
| Number 54 and attached railings | II* | Bootham | House | c. 1840 | 14 June 1954 | SE5993152383; 53°57′51″N 1°05′17″W | 1259435 | Number 54 and attached railings More images | Q17550056 |
| Garden railings and gate piers to number 65 (The Churchill) | II | Bootham | Railings | c. 1840 | 19 August 1971 | SE5980152535; 53°57′56″N 1°05′24″W | 1259445 | Garden railings and gate piers to number 65 (The Churchill) More images | Q26550558 |
| Bootham Grange | II | 7 Clifton | House | c. 1840 | 28 April 1988 | SE5972352565; 53°57′57″N 1°05′28″W | 1259246 | Bootham Grange More images | Q26550385 |
| St Peter's School annexe | II | 18 Clifton | House | c. 1840 | 24 June 1983 | SE5968052662; 53°58′00″N 1°05′30″W | 1259252 | St Peter's School annexe More images | Q26550391 |
| 46 Heworth Green | II | Heworth | House | c. 1840 | 24 June 1983 | SE6127152653; 53°57′59″N 1°04′03″W | 1257660 | 46 Heworth Green More images | Q26548995 |
| 98 and 100 Heworth Green | II | Heworth | House | c. 1840 | 24 June 1983 | SE6147852736; 53°58′01″N 1°03′52″W | 1257635 | 98 and 100 Heworth Green More images | Q26548970 |
| 104 Heworth Green | II | Heworth | House | c. 1840 | 19 August 1971 | SE6151152745; 53°58′02″N 1°03′50″W | 1257637 | 104 Heworth Green More images | Q26548972 |
| 108 Heworth Green | II | Heworth | House | c. 1840 | 24 June 1983 | SE6152552753; 53°58′02″N 1°03′49″W | 1257639 | 108 Heworth Green More images | Q26548974 |
| Heworth Villa | II | 110 Heworth Green, Heworth | House | c. 1840 | 24 June 1983 | SE6154052762; 53°58′02″N 1°03′48″W | 1257641 | Heworth Villa More images | Q26548976 |
| (The Limes) College of Ripon and York St John | II | 112 Heworth Green, Heworth | House | c. 1840 | 24 June 1983 | SE6156252762; 53°58′02″N 1°03′47″W | 1257642 | (The Limes) College of Ripon and York St John More images | Q26548977 |
| 36, 38 and 40 Lord Mayor's Walk | II | | House | c. 1840 | 24 June 1983 | SE6048452368; 53°57′50″N 1°04′46″W | 1257464 | 36, 38 and 40 Lord Mayor's Walk More images | Q26548815 |
| 42 Lord Mayor's Walk | II | | House | c. 1840 | 24 June 1983 | SE6047352376; 53°57′50″N 1°04′47″W | 1257465 | 42 Lord Mayor's Walk More images | Q26548816 |
| The Herdsman's Cottage | II | Malton Road | House | c. 1840 | 24 June 1983 | SE6152852933; 53°58′08″N 1°03′49″W | 1257403 | The Herdsman's Cottage More images | Q26548762 |
| 28 Monkgate | II | | Shop | c. 1840 | 24 June 1983 | SE6064352306; 53°57′48″N 1°04′38″W | 1257241 | 28 Monkgate More images | Q26548636 |
| 54, 56 and 58 Monkgate | II | | House | c. 1840 | 24 June 1983 | SE6074952388; 53°57′50″N 1°04′32″W | 1257181 | 54, 56 and 58 Monkgate More images | Q26548579 |
| 62, 64 and 66 Monkgate | II | | House | c. 1840 | 24 June 1983 | SE6076452401; 53°57′51″N 1°04′31″W | 1257186 | 62, 64 and 66 Monkgate More images | Q26548584 |
| Former coach house to number 25 | II | Shipton Road | Coach house | c. 1840 | 24 June 1983 | SE5885353311; 53°58′21″N 1°06′15″W | 1256628 | Former coach house to number 25 More images | Q26548110 |
| 25 Shipton Road | II | | House | c. 1840 | 24 June 1983 | SE5886553302; 53°58′21″N 1°06′15″W | 1256627 | 25 Shipton Road More images | Q26548109 |
| Numbers 35 and 36 and attached area railings at front | II | St Mary's | House | c. 1840 | 12 June 1991 | SE5980152377; 53°57′50″N 1°05′24″W | 1256777 | Numbers 35 and 36 and attached area railings at front More images | Q26548223 |
| Constantine House | II | 37 St Mary's | House | c. 1840 | 12 June 1991 | SE5981952393; 53°57′51″N 1°05′23″W | 1256779 | Constantine House More images | Q5163813 |
| Bootham Lodge and attached railings | II | 56 Bootham | House | 1840–1845 | 14 June 1954 | SE5991652392; 53°57′51″N 1°05′18″W | 1259437 | Bootham Lodge and attached railings More images | Q26550551 |
| Heworth Croft and attached coach house (college of Ripon and York St John) | II | 19 Heworth Green, Heworth | House | c. 1842 | 24 June 1983 | SE6102052610; 53°57′58″N 1°04′17″W | 1257650 | Heworth Croft and attached coach house (college of Ripon and York St John) More images | Q26548985 |
| 29 and 31 Penley's Grove Street | II | | House | 1843 | 24 June 1983 | SE6063352596; 53°57′57″N 1°04′38″W | 1256899 | 29 and 31 Penley's Grove Street More images | Q26548324 |
| Lodge at St Peter's School and attached wall and gate | II | Clifton | House | c. 1844 | 24 June 1983 | SE5965152634; 53°57′59″N 1°05′32″W | 1259194 | Lodge at St Peter's School and attached wall and gate | Q26550335 |
| 36 and 38 Clarence Street | II | | House | c. 1845 | 24 June 1983 | SE6030152675; 53°58′00″N 1°04′56″W | 1259269 | 36 and 38 Clarence Street More images | Q26550406 |
| 48 and 50 Heworth Green | II | Heworth | House | c. 1845 | 24 June 1983 | SE6127752657; 53°57′59″N 1°04′03″W | 1257634 | 48 and 50 Heworth Green More images | Q26548969 |
| 15 Penley's Grove Street | II | | House | c. 1845 | 24 June 1983 | SE6068652567; 53°57′56″N 1°04′35″W | 1256895 | 15 Penley's Grove Street More images | Q26548321 |
| University College of Ripon and York St John college building | II | Lord Mayor's Walk | College | 1845 | 1 July 1968 | SE6041552496; 53°57′54″N 1°04′50″W | 1257468 | University College of Ripon and York St John college building More images | Q26548819 |
| 56 and 58 Lord Mayor's Walk | II | | House | c. 1845–1850 | 24 June 1983 | SE6027852511; 53°57′55″N 1°04′58″W | 1257467 | 56 and 58 Lord Mayor's Walk More images | Q26548818 |
| University College of Ripon and York St John school building | II | Lord Mayor's Walk | School | 1846 | 1 July 1968 | SE6048552477; 53°57′53″N 1°04′46″W | 1257441 | University College of Ripon and York St John school building | Q26548793 |
| 17 Penley's Grove Street | II | | House | 1846 | 24 June 1983 | SE6067652571; 53°57′56″N 1°04′36″W | 1256898 | 17 Penley's Grove Street More images | Q26548323 |
| 1 and 3 Monkgate | II | | Shop | 1846 | 24 June 1983 | SE6054852258; 53°57′46″N 1°04′43″W | 1257236 | 1 and 3 Monkgate More images | Q26548631 |
| 37 Monkgate | II | | House | c. 1847 | 14 June 1954 | SE6069352403; 53°57′51″N 1°04′35″W | 1257205 | 37 Monkgate More images | Q26548604 |
| Boundary wall and railings approximately 15 metres east of Grange House | II | Huntington Road | Wall | c. 1848 | 14 March 1997 | SE6088453034; 53°58′11″N 1°04′24″W | 1257551 | Upload Photo | Q26548893 |
| St Hilda's Garth | II | Ousecliffe Gardens | House | 1848 | 24 June 1983 | SE5914052733; 53°58′02″N 1°06′00″W | 1257010 | St Hilda's Garth More images | Q26548429 |
| Grange House | II | Huntington Road | Offices | 1848–49 | 24 June 1983 | SE6085453041; 53°58′12″N 1°04′26″W | 1257550 | Grange House | Q26548892 |
| St Mary's House | II | Huntington Road | Workhouse | 1848–49 | 24 June 1983 | SE6083253035; 53°58′11″N 1°04′27″W | 1257552 | Upload Photo | Q26548894 |
| 22 Burton Stone Lane | II | | House | Mid-19th century | 14 March 1997 | SE5966552806; 53°58′04″N 1°05′31″W | 1259355 | 22 Burton Stone Lane More images | Q26550476 |
| 32 Clarence Street | II | | House | Mid-19th century | 24 June 1983 | SE6029152659; 53°57′59″N 1°04′57″W | 1259267 | 32 Clarence Street More images | Q26550404 |
| 34 Clarence Street | II | | Shop | Mid-19th century | 24 June 1983 | SE6029452665; 53°58′00″N 1°04′57″W | 1259268 | 34 Clarence Street More images | Q26550405 |
| Garden railings fronting road at number 29 (song school of St Olave's School) | II | Clifton | Railings | Mid-19th century | 14 March 1997 | SE5958252717; 53°58′02″N 1°05′36″W | 1259220 | Garden railings fronting road at number 29 (song school of St Olave's School) More images | Q26550360 |
| Gates and garden railings to number 18 | II | Clifton | Gate | Mid-19th century | 24 June 1983 | SE5966952655; 53°58′00″N 1°05′31″W | 1259253 | Gates and garden railings to number 18 More images | Q26550392 |
| 6 Clifton | II | | Outbuilding | Mid-19th century | 14 March 1997 | SE5973552604; 53°57′58″N 1°05′27″W | 1259245 | 6 Clifton More images | Q26550384 |
| Barclays Bank and attached railings | II | 50 Clifton | House | Mid-19th century | 14 June 1954 | SE5957052779; 53°58′04″N 1°05′36″W | 1259225 | Barclays Bank and attached railings More images | Q26550365 |
| Waggon and Horses public house | II | 48 Gillygate | Public house | Mid-19th century | 24 June 1983 | SE6020652389; 53°57′51″N 1°05′02″W | 1257784 | Waggon and Horses public house More images | Q26549109 |
| 5 Monkgate, 1 Lord Mayor's Walk | II | | Shop | Mid-19th century | 24 June 1983 | SE6056052268; 53°57′47″N 1°04′42″W | 1257481 | 5 Monkgate, 1 Lord Mayor's Walk More images | Q26548832 |
| 3, 5 and 7 Lord Mayor's Walk | II | | Shop | Mid-19th century | 24 June 1983 | SE6055452275; 53°57′47″N 1°04′43″W | 1257455 | 3, 5 and 7 Lord Mayor's Walk More images | Q26548806 |
| 28 Lord Mayor's Walk | II | | House | Mid-19th century | 24 June 1983 | SE6050252349; 53°57′49″N 1°04′46″W | 1257459 | 28 Lord Mayor's Walk More images | Q26548810 |
| 30 Lord Mayor's Walk | II | | House | Mid-19th century | 24 June 1983 | SE6049852354; 53°57′49″N 1°04′46″W | 1257460 | 30 Lord Mayor's Walk More images | Q26548811 |
| 44 and 46 Marygate | II | | House | Mid-19th century | 24 June 1983 | SE5985052216; 53°57′45″N 1°05′21″W | 1257379 | 44 and 46 Marygate More images | Q26548741 |
| Gazebo approximately 20 metres south east of number 6 (number 6 not included) | II | Marygate Lane | Gazebo | Mid-19th century | 24 June 1983 | SE5980952235; 53°57′46″N 1°05′24″W | 1257354 | Upload Photo | Q26548718 |
| 7 Rawcliffe Lane | II | | House | Mid-19th century | 24 June 1983 | SE5910353315; 53°58′21″N 1°06′02″W | 1256838 | 7 Rawcliffe Lane | Q26548276 |
| 21 and 23 Shipton Road | II | | House | Mid-19th century | 24 June 1983 | SE5890353274; 53°58′20″N 1°06′13″W | 1256626 | 21 and 23 Shipton Road More images | Q26548108 |
| Wind pump approximately 100 metres south west of number 7 (not included) | II | Willow Grove, Heworth | Wind pump | Mid-19th century | 20 June 1989 | SE6175653358; 53°58′21″N 1°03′36″W | 1256226 | Upload Photo | Q26547765 |
| 68 Bootham | II | | House | c. 1852 | 1 July 1968 | SE5986152444; 53°57′53″N 1°05′21″W | 1256735 | 68 Bootham | Q26548188 |
| Church of St Thomas | II | Lowther Street | Church | 1853–54 | 14 March 1997 | SE6048552804; 53°58′04″N 1°04′46″W | 1257401 | Church of St Thomas More images | Q26548760 |
| Numbers 64 and 66 and attached railings (St Mary's House number 66) | II | Bootham | House | c. 1855 | 28 April 1988 | SE5988052425; 53°57′52″N 1°05′20″W | 1259443 | Numbers 64 and 66 and attached railings (St Mary's House number 66) More images | Q26550557 |
| Numbers 70–76 (even) and attached front railings | II | Bootham | House | c. 1855 | 28 April 1988 | SE5985352452; 53°57′53″N 1°05′21″W | 1259408 | Numbers 70–76 (even) and attached front railings More images | Q26550524 |
| Lodge at Bootham Park Hospital | II | Bootham | Lodge | 1857 | 24 June 1983 | SE5990452457; 53°57′53″N 1°05′18″W | 1259404 | Lodge at Bootham Park Hospital More images | Q26550520 |
| Railings enclosing playing field approximately 95 metres south of Bootham Park Hospital | II | Bootham | Railings | 1857 | 14 March 1997 | SE6009052665; 53°58′00″N 1°05′08″W | 1259405 | Railings enclosing playing field approximately 95 metres south of Bootham Park Hospital More images | Q26550521 |
| Gateway, gates and railings to Bootham Park Hospital | II | Bootham | Gate | 1857–58 | 28 April 1988 | SE5987452471; 53°57′53″N 1°05′20″W | 1259400 | Gateway, gates and railings to Bootham Park Hospital More images | Q26550516 |
| University College of Ripon and York St John drama studio | II | Lord Mayor's Walk | Chapel | c. 1858 | 24 June 1983 | SE6044852419; 53°57′52″N 1°04′48″W | 1257439 | University College of Ripon and York St John drama studio More images | Q26548791 |
| Number 62 and attached railings | II | Bootham | House | c. 1860 | 14 March 1997 | SE5990052412; 53°57′52″N 1°05′18″W | 1259442 | Number 62 and attached railings More images | Q26550556 |
| 80 and 82 Bootham | II | | House | c. 1860 | 14 March 1997 | SE5982752477; 53°57′54″N 1°05′22″W | 1259413 | 80 and 82 Bootham More images | Q26550529 |
| Numbers 1–9 (consecutive) and attached walls and railings | II | St Mary's | House | c. 1860–1870 | 14 March 1997 | SE5982452359; 53°57′50″N 1°05′23″W | 1256774 | Numbers 1–9 (consecutive) and attached walls and railings More images | Q26548220 |
| Number 78 and attached railings | II | Bootham | House | 1862 | 5 November 1990 | SE5983452475; 53°57′54″N 1°05′22″W | 1259412 | Number 78 and attached railings More images | Q26550528 |
| Medical Superintendent's house | II | Bootham Park Hospital, Bootham | House | 1862–63 | 6 April 2016 | SE6016752797; 53°58′04″N 1°05′04″W | 1434279 | Medical Superintendent's house More images | Q26678007 |
| 2 Monkgate | II | | Shop | c. 1865 | 14 March 1997 | SE6057252244; 53°57′46″N 1°04′42″W | 1257237 | 2 Monkgate More images | Q26548632 |
| Numbers 1 and 2 and attached railings | II | Bootham Terrace | House | c. 1865 | 14 March 1997 | SE5976652464; 53°57′53″N 1°05′26″W | 1259364 | Numbers 1 and 2 and attached railings More images | Q26550484 |
| Numbers 3, 4 and 5 and attached railings | II | Bootham Terrace | House | 1865 | 14 March 1997 | SE5975752457; 53°57′53″N 1°05′26″W | 1259365 | Numbers 3, 4 and 5 and attached railings More images | Q26550485 |
| Number 6 and attached railings | II | Bootham Terrace | House | 1865 | 14 March 1997 | SE5974952441; 53°57′53″N 1°05′27″W | 1259366 | Number 6 and attached railings More images | Q26550486 |
| Number 7 and attached railings | II | Bootham Terrace | House | 1865 | 14 March 1997 | SE5974552434; 53°57′52″N 1°05′27″W | 1259368 | Number 7 and attached railings More images | Q26550488 |
| Number 8 and attached railings | II | Bootham Terrace | House | 1865 | 14 March 1997 | SE5974252427; 53°57′52″N 1°05′27″W | 1259369 | Number 8 and attached railings More images | Q26550489 |
| Number 9 and attached railings | II | Bootham Terrace | House | 1865 | 14 March 1997 | SE5973852422; 53°57′52″N 1°05′27″W | 1259370 | Number 9 and attached railings More images | Q26550490 |
| Number 10 and attached railings | II | Bootham Terrace | House | 1865 | 14 March 1997 | SE5973452415; 53°57′52″N 1°05′28″W | 1259371 | Number 10 and attached railings More images | Q26550491 |
| Number 11 and attached railings | II | Bootham Terrace | House | 1865 | 14 March 1997 | SE5973252408; 53°57′52″N 1°05′28″W | 1259372 | Number 11 and attached railings More images | Q26681853 |
| Number 12 and attached railings | II | Bootham Terrace | House | 1865 | 14 March 1997 | SE5973052402; 53°57′51″N 1°05′28″W | 1259373 | Number 12 and attached railings More images | Q26550493 |
| Number 13 and attached railings | II | Bootham Terrace | House | 1865 | 14 March 1997 | SE5972652396; 53°57′51″N 1°05′28″W | 1259374 | Number 13 and attached railings More images | Q26550494 |
| Numbers 14 and 15 and attached railings | II | Bootham Terrace | House | 1865 | 14 March 1997 | SE5971852390; 53°57′51″N 1°05′28″W | 1259376 | Numbers 14 and 15 and attached railings More images | Q26550496 |
| Numbers 16 and 17 and attached railings | II | Bootham Terrace | House | 1865 | 14 March 1997 | SE5971352379; 53°57′51″N 1°05′29″W | 1259377 | Numbers 16 and 17 and attached railings More images | Q26550497 |
| Numbers 18 and 19 and attached railings | II | Bootham Terrace | House | 1865 | 14 March 1997 | SE5970852368; 53°57′50″N 1°05′29″W | 1259379 | Numbers 18 and 19 and attached railings More images | Q26550499 |
| Numbers 20 and 21 and attached railings | II | Bootham Terrace | House | 1865 | 14 March 1997 | SE5970152353; 53°57′50″N 1°05′29″W | 1259382 | Numbers 20 and 21 and attached railings More images | Q26550502 |
| Former chapel at Bootham Park Hospital | II | Bootham | Church | 1865 | 24 June 1983 | SE6016352706; 53°58′01″N 1°05′04″W | 1259398 | Former chapel at Bootham Park Hospital More images | Q26550515 |
| Church of St Philip and St James | II | Clifton | Church | 1866–67 | 14 March 1997 | SE5930953117; 53°58′15″N 1°05′50″W | 1259228 | Church of St Philip and St James More images | Q26550367 |
| Churchyard wall, railings and gate to Church of St Philip and St James | II | Clifton | Wall | 1867 | 14 March 1997 | SE5928453107; 53°58′14″N 1°05′52″W | 1259230 | Upload Photo | Q26550369 |
| Church of Holy Trinity | II | East Parade, Heworth | Church | 1868–69 | 24 June 1983 | SE6178252625; 53°57′58″N 1°03′35″W | 1257878 | Church of Holy Trinity More images | Q26549189 |
| 134–140 Clifton Green | II | | House | 1870–1880 | 14 March 1997 | SE5932253077; 53°58′13″N 1°05′50″W | 1259202 | 134–140 Clifton Green More images | Q26550343 |
| 9–12 Grosvenor Terrace | II | | House | 1870–1880 | 14 March 1997 | SE5989852686; 53°58′00″N 1°05′18″W | 1257671 | 9–12 Grosvenor Terrace More images | Q26549006 |
| Number 45 and attached railings | II | Bootham | House | Late 19th century | 1 July 1968 | SE5998752376; 53°57′50″N 1°05′14″W | 1259461 | Number 45 and attached railings More images | Q26550573 |
| 2 and 2B Gillygate | II | | Shop | Late 19th century | 14 March 1997 | SE6012352273; 53°57′47″N 1°05′06″W | 1257778 | 2 and 2B Gillygate More images | Q26549104 |
| Number 22 and attached walls and railings | II | Bootham Terrace | House | c. 1875 | 14 March 1997 | SE5970252344; 53°57′49″N 1°05′29″W | 1259383 | Number 22 and attached walls and railings More images | Q26550503 |
| Vicarage and vicarage lodge to Church of St Philip and St James | II | Clifton | Vicarage | 1879–80 | 24 June 1983 | SE5931353151; 53°58′16″N 1°05′50″W | 1259231 | Vicarage and vicarage lodge to Church of St Philip and St James More images | Q26550370 |
| 1–9 The Avenue | II | | House | 1880–1890 | 14 March 1997 | SE5942252796; 53°58′04″N 1°05′44″W | 1256478 | 1–9 The Avenue More images | Q26547988 |
| Groves Chapel | II | Clarence Street | Chapel | 1881–1884 | 16 February 1988 | SE6033952837; 53°58′05″N 1°04′54″W | 1259270 | Groves Chapel More images | Q26550407 |
| The Salvation Army Citadel | II | Gillygate | Citadel | 1882–83 | 3 May 1990 | SE6022152481; 53°57′54″N 1°05′01″W | 1257749 | The Salvation Army Citadel More images | Q26549075 |
| Horse drinking trough and canopy | II | Clifton Green | Trough | 1883 | 24 June 1983 | SE5932053025; 53°58′12″N 1°05′50″W | 1259204 | Horse drinking trough and canopy More images | Q26550345 |
| Chimney at works and services depot of York City Council | II | Foss Islands Road | Chimney | c. 1890 | 24 June 1983 | SE6102451979; 53°57′37″N 1°04′17″W | 1257848 | Chimney at works and services depot of York City Council More images | Q26549165 |
| Shipton Street School and former schoolmaster's house now number 2 | II | Shipton Street | School | 1890 | 3 June 2003 | SE5994853077; 53°58′13″N 1°05′15″W | 1096160 | Shipton Street School and former schoolmaster's house now number 2 More images | Q26388450 |
| The Bay Horse | II | 68 Marygate | Public house | 1893–94 | 14 March 1997 | SE5976352128; 53°57′42″N 1°05′26″W | 1257385 | The Bay Horse More images | Q26548747 |
| Former memorial gymnasium at St Peter's School | II | Clifton | Gymnasium | 1894 | 1 July 1968 | SE5960052676; 53°58′00″N 1°05′35″W | 1259234 | Upload Photo | Q26550373 |
| Park Grove School | II | Park Grove | School | 1895 | 24 June 1983 | SE6075052747; 53°58′02″N 1°04′32″W | 1257012 | Park Grove School More images | Q26548431 |
| The Burton Stone Inn and attached front wall | II | Clifton | Public house | 1896 | 24 June 1983 | SE5960052731; 53°58′02″N 1°05′35″W | 1259197 | The Burton Stone Inn and attached front wall More images | Q26550338 |
| Tap and Spile public house | II | 29 Monkgate | Public house | 1897 | 24 June 1983 | SE6065852360; 53°57′50″N 1°04′37″W | 1257200 | Tap and Spile public house More images | Q26548599 |
| Haxby Road School | II | Haxby Road | School | 1903–04 | 1 July 1968 | SE6068453310; 53°58′20″N 1°04′35″W | 1257673 | Haxby Road School | Q26549008 |
| Queen Anne's School | II | Queen Anne's Road | School | 1908–1910 | 29 February 2000 | SE5960252400; 53°57′51″N 1°05′35″W | 1380141 | Queen Anne's School | Q26660356 |
| The Kiosk | II | Stockton Lane | Bus terminus | 1915 | 14 March 1997 | SE6156252827; 53°58′04″N 1°03′47″W | 1256561 | The Kiosk More images | Q26548047 |
| Clifton War Memorial | II | Shipton Road, Clifton | War memorial | 1920 | 12 April 2018 | SE5928653105; 53°58′14″N 1°05′52″W | 1455280 | Clifton War Memorial More images | Q66479571 |
| John Burrill homes | II | 1–2 Water End | House | 1925–1931 | 14 March 1997 | SE5912453001; 53°58′11″N 1°06′01″W | 1256264 | John Burrill homes More images | Q26547795 |
| John Burrill homes | II | 3–5 Water End | House | 1925–1931 | 14 March 1997 | SE5912653011; 53°58′11″N 1°06′01″W | 1256265 | John Burrill homes More images | Q26681812 |
| John Burrill homes | II | 6–7 Water End | House | 1925–1931 | 14 March 1997 | SE5915653024; 53°58′12″N 1°05′59″W | 1256266 | John Burrill homes More images | Q26891605 |
| Garden wall and gates approximately 25 metres south east of the John Burrill homes | II | Water End | Wall | 1925–1931 | 14 March 1997 | SE5916052967; 53°58′10″N 1°05′59″W | 1256221 | Garden wall and gates approximately 25 metres south east of the John Burrill homes More images | Q26547760 |
| Range approximately 10 metres north west of the chapel at St Peter's School | II | Clifton | School | 1927 | 14 March 1997 | SE5954352660; 53°58′00″N 1°05′38″W | 1259195 | Range approximately 10 metres north west of the chapel at St Peter's School | Q26550336 |
| Joseph Rowntree Memorial Library | II | Haxby Road | Library | 1927 | 20 August 2007 | SE6065853551; 53°58′28″N 1°04′36″W | 1392224 | Joseph Rowntree Memorial Library More images | Q26671457 |
| Joseph Rowntree Theatre | II | Haxby Road | Theatre | 1935 | 29 May 2003 | SE6073053579; 53°58′29″N 1°04′32″W | 1096161 | Joseph Rowntree Theatre More images | Q26388451 |
| Telephone kiosk next to St Mary's Tower | II | Marygate | Telephone kiosk | 1935 | 8 May 1990 | SE5997752338; 53°57′49″N 1°05′14″W | 1257352 | Telephone kiosk next to St Mary's Tower More images | Q26548716 |
| Assembly hall at Bootham School | II | Bootham | Assembly hall | 1965–66 | 31 March 2007 | SE6002152439; 53°57′52″N 1°05′12″W | 1393284 | Upload Photo | Q26672459 |
| New Chapel at St John's College | II | Lord Mayor's Walk | Chapel | 1966–67 | 2 September 2003 | SE6047252577; 53°57′57″N 1°04′47″W | 1390606 | New Chapel at St John's College More images | Q26669994 |

== See also ==
- Grade I listed buildings in North Yorkshire
- Grade II* listed buildings in North Yorkshire
