= 49 Bootham =

Listed building in York, England

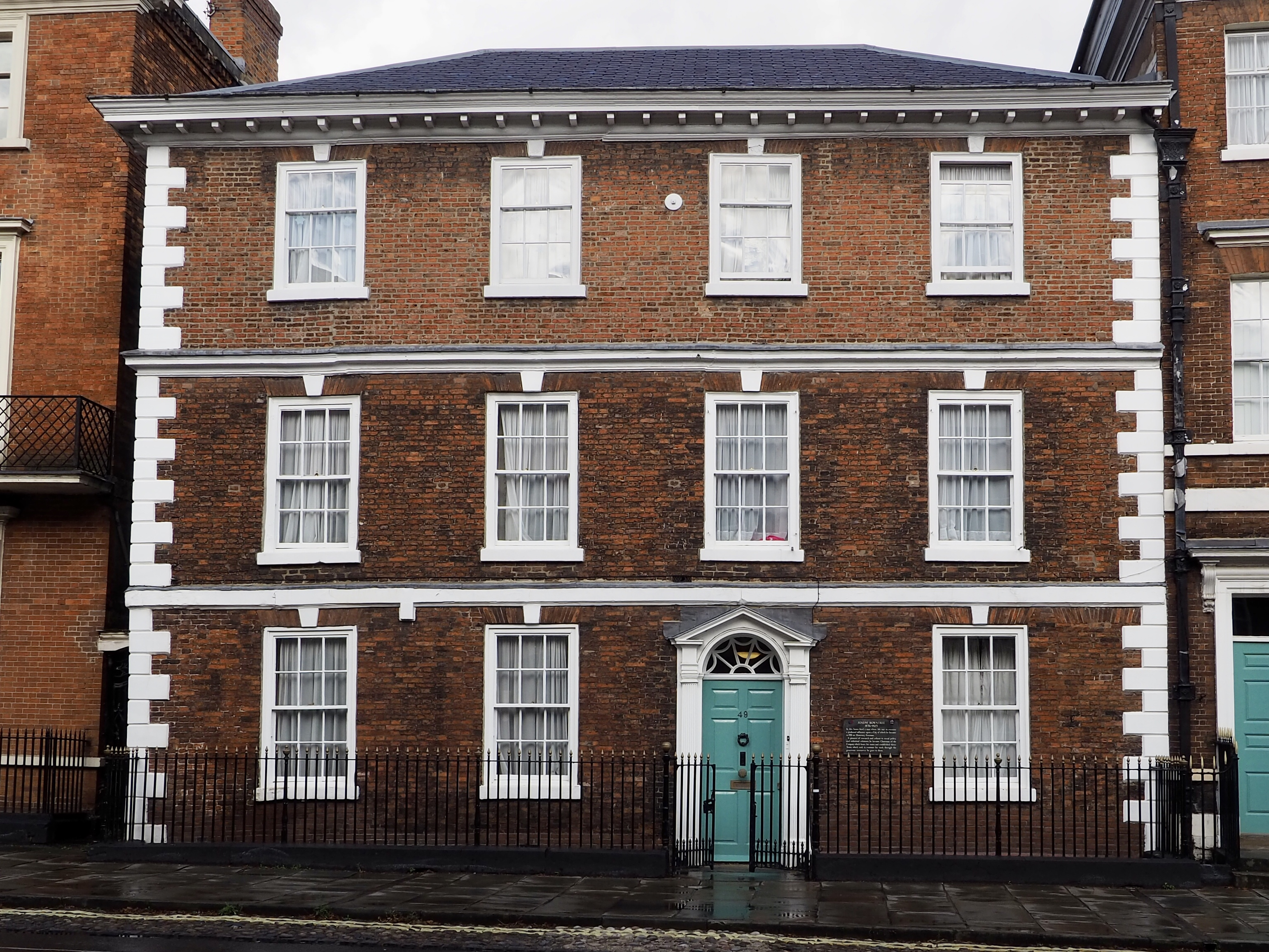
- The building in 2021
- Interactive map of the 49 Bootham area

General information
- Location: Bootham, York, England
- Coordinates: 53°57′51″N 1°05′15″W
- Completed: Late 17th century
- Renovated: c. 1738 (converted and storey added)

Technical details
- Floor count: 3

Design and construction
- Designations

Listed Building – Grade II*
- Official name: Number 49 and attached railings
- Designated: 14 June 1954
- Reference no.: 1259465

49 Bootham is a historic building on Bootham, a street leading north from the city centre of York, England.

The building was constructed in the late 17th century, as two semi-detached houses, each two storeys tall, with an attic. In about 1738, the houses were combined, an extra storey being added to the front section, and the whole building refronted. The doorway was altered in the late 18th century, around the time that the house was sold to Richard Vanden-Bempde-Johnstone. The house was purchased by Bootham School in 1846, becoming the home of the headmaster. From 1875 to 1882, Joseph Rowntree rented it from the school as his house, something commemorated by a plaque. The house was Grade II* listed in 1954, and its rear section was rebuilt in 1965. It remains part of Bootham School.

The building is constructed of brick, with painted stone dressings and a slate roof. It has three storeys and is four bays wide, the front including quoins and two bands separating the storeys. The doorway has a fanlight and a doorcase with fluted pilasters, while the windows are sashes. There is a basement, enclosed by iron railings. Inside, many fittings date from 1738, including panelling, fireplaces, and the main staircase. The cornice and some moulded ceiling beams survive from the 17th century.

== See also ==
- Grade II* listed buildings in the City of York
- Listed buildings in York (outside the city walls, northern part)
