= The White House, York =

Listed former pub in York, England

The White House
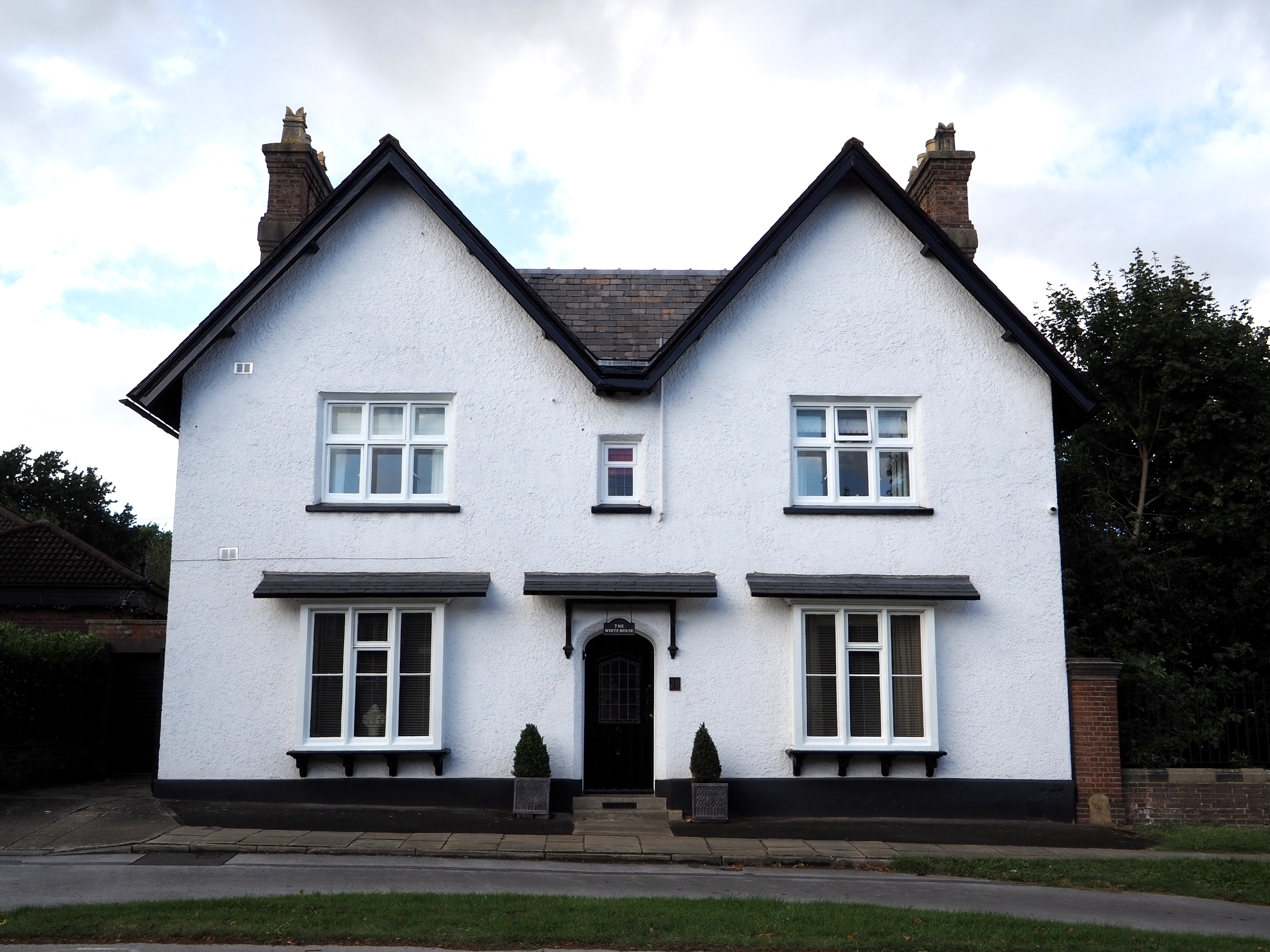
- The building in 2021
- Interactive map of the The White House area
- Former names: Green Tree; Sycamore Inn

General information
- Status: Private residence
- Type: Public house (former)
- Location: 28 Water End, Clifton, York, England
- Coordinates: 53.9694°N 1.1000°W
- Year built: Early 19th century
- Renovated: 20th century (altered)

Design and construction
- Designations

Listed Building – Grade II
- Official name: The White House
- Designated: 24 June 1983
- Reference no.: 1256263

The White House is a Grade II listed former public house on Water End in Clifton, a suburb of York, England. Built in the early 19th century, by 1830 it was known as the Green Tree, and by 1836 as the Sycamore Inn. It was later adapted for use as a private house, with further alterations made in the 20th century. The site was included in the Clifton conservation area in 1968.

== History ==
The building was constructed in the early 19th century as a public house and was later adapted for use as a private house, with additional alterations carried out during the 20th century. By 1830 the building was known as the Green Tree and was run by George Holgate. Six years later, it was called the Sycamore Inn, with Alice Holgate as the licensee.

In 1968, the site was included within the newly established Clifton conservation area, and on 24 June 1983, The White House was designated a Grade II listed building.

== Architecture ==
The building has painted roughcast walls with exposed brick on the sides and a slate roof with two front‑facing gables. It has two storeys, with a main bay beneath each gable. The ground‑floor windows project on timber brackets and have small sloping slate roofs; each window has three lights with timber divisions. The first‑floor windows are also three‑light casements with an additional horizontal bar, and there is a smaller window between them. The central entrance has a roughcast surround with a shallow Tudor‑style arch and a small slate canopy on shaped timber brackets. The door includes glazed panels. The gable ends extend slightly, and there are chimneys to both sides with tall partly rendered tops.

== See also ==
- Listed buildings in York (outside the city walls, northern part)
