= 54 Bootham =

Listed building in York, England

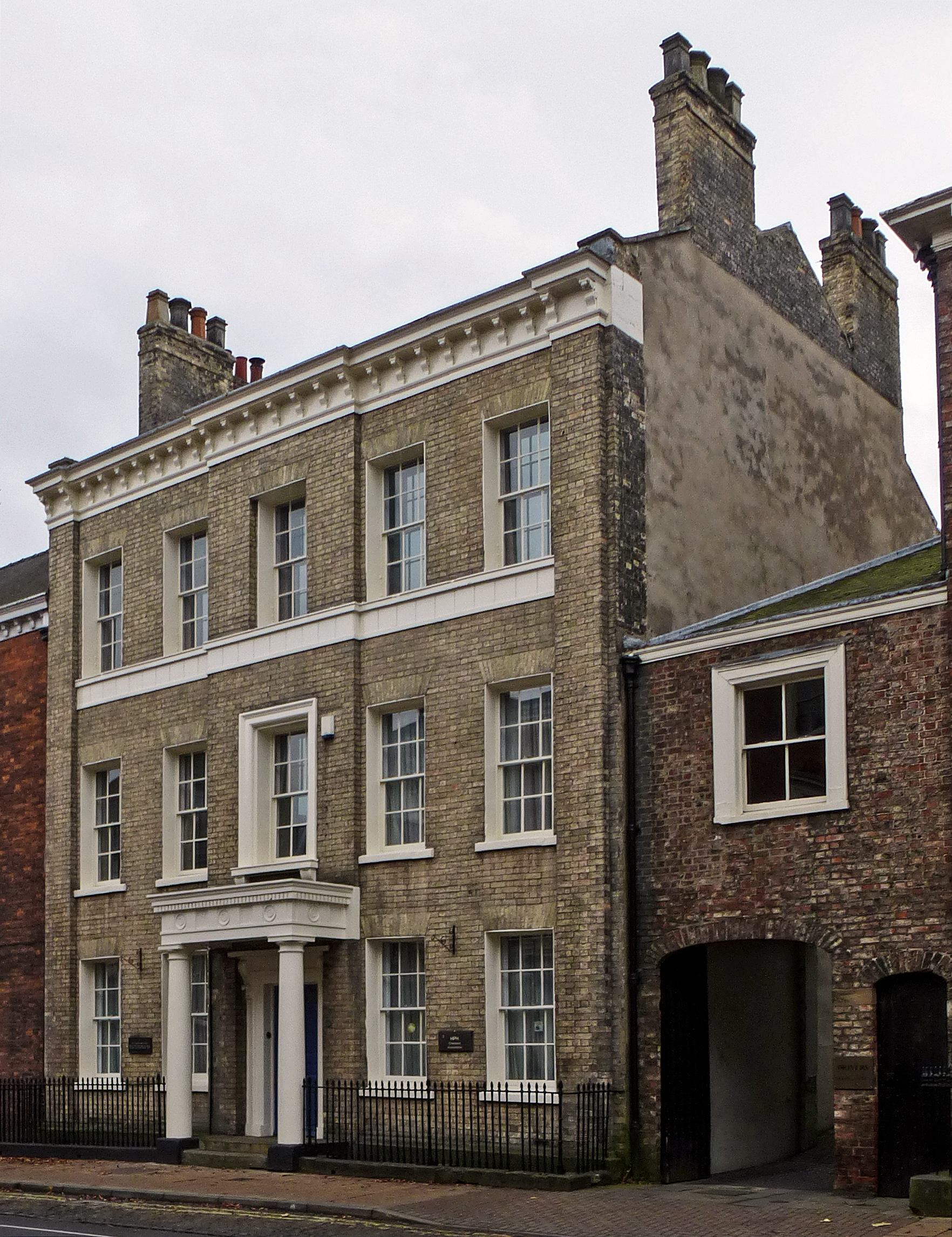
- The house in 2013
- Interactive map of the 54 Bootham area

General information
- Location: Bootham, York, England
- Coordinates: 53°57′51″N 1°05′17″W
- Completed: c. 1840
- Renovated: 1950s (converted)

Technical details
- Floor count: 3

Design and construction
- Designations

Listed Building – Grade II*
- Official name: Number 54 and attached railings
- Designated: 14 June 1954
- Reference no.: 1259435

54 Bootham is a historic building on Bootham, a street running north from the city centre of York, England.

The house was built in about 1840. In 1907, W. H. Auden was born in the house. It was Grade II* listed in 1954. Around this time, it was converted to offices. It was later purchased by the York Conservation Trust, and by the 2020s was rented to HPH Accountants.

The front of the three-storey building is constructed of white brick, a popular material at the time, which has become grey over time. It is five bays wide, with the central bay projecting forward, as do the pilaster strips at the left and right of the building. The windows are sashes, and the central first floor window has an architrave. There are also two dormer windows in the attic. The door is under a Doric porch. The rear of the building is constructed of red brick, and there is a central projection, which houses toilets, accessed from the half-landings of the staircase. There are paired chimneys on each gable end of the roof. Inside, the original hall and staircase survive, along with some plasterwork and doorcases. Early cast-iron railings on stone copings surround the basement.

== See also ==
- Grade II* listed buildings in the City of York
- Listed buildings in York (outside the city walls, northern part)
