= Ingram House =

Listed building in York, England

Ingram's House
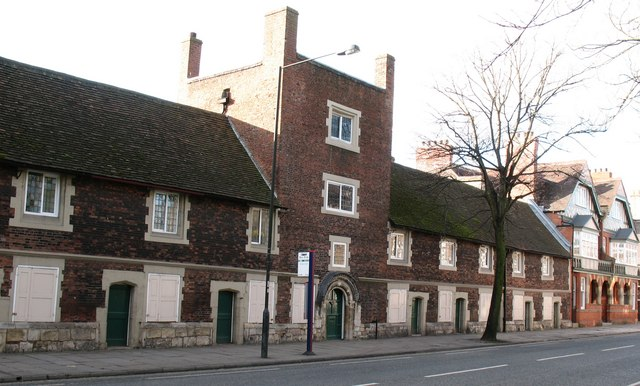
- The building in 2021
- Interactive map of the Ingram's House area
- Former names: Ingram's Hospital

General information
- Status: Converted to flats
- Type: Almshouse (former)
- Location: Bootham, York, England
- Coordinates: 53°57′55″N 1°5′25″W
- Year built: 1630–1632
- Renovated: 1649 (repaired); 1958 (altered)
- Client: Arthur Ingram

Design and construction
- Designations

Listed Building – Grade II*
- Official name: Ingram House
- Designated: 14 June 1954
- Reference no.: 1259395

Ingram House is a historic building on Bootham in the city of York, England. It was built as an almshouse for ten poor widows between 1630 and 1632 by real estate developer and politician Sir Arthur Ingram and was originally known as Ingram's Hospital. It was damaged during the Siege of York and was restored in 1649. It is the most important mid-17th-century building in Bootham, pre-classical and composed of 11 bays of two low storeys, but with a four-storey central tower. The middle doorway dates back to the Norman period, and is believed to have once been a doorway to Holy Trinity Priory.

Charles I of England stayed at the house in 1642. It became a Grade II* listed building in 1954. In 1959, it was converted into four flats.

== See also ==
- Grade II* listed buildings in the City of York
- Listed buildings in York (outside the city walls, northern part)
