= Bay Horse, Monkgate =

Listed pub in York, England

Bay Horse
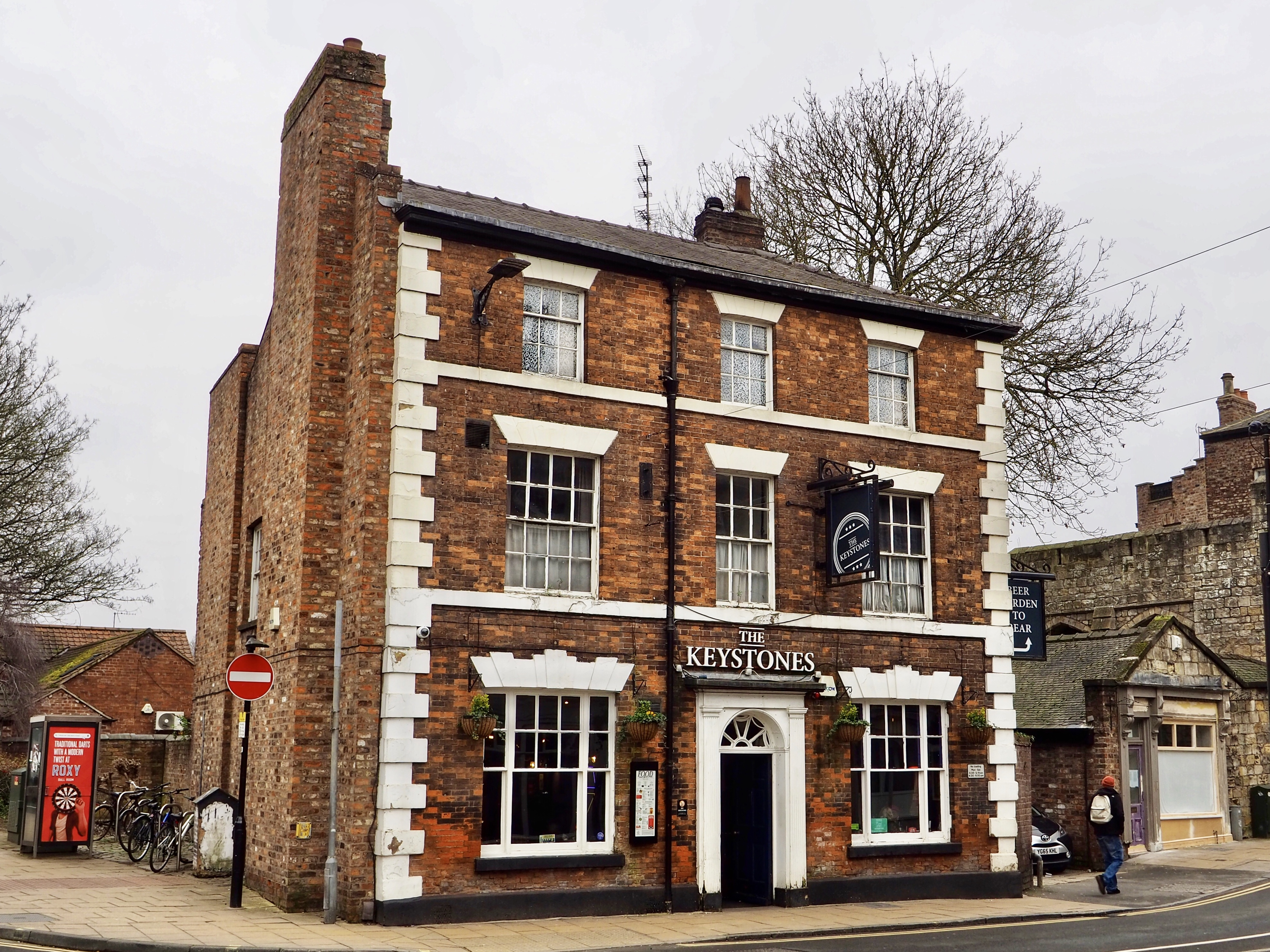
- The pub in 2024
- Former names: Bay Horse Hotel
- Alternative names: The Keystones

General information
- Type: Public house
- Location: 4 Monkgate, York, England
- Coordinates: 53.9628°N 1.0780°W
- Year built: Late 18th century
- Renovated: 1837 (refronted); 2025 (refurbished)
- Owner: Stonegate

Design and construction
- Designations

Listed Building – Grade II
- Official name: The Bay Horse public house
- Designated: 19 August 1971
- Reference no.: 1257238

Website
- Official website

The Bay Horse, now trading as The Keystones, is a Grade II listed public house on Monkgate in York, England. The building is described in its official listing as late‑18th‑century, while The Yorkshire Post has given a date of 1799 and another source suggests a probable date of 1820. Its front was rebuilt in 1837. The site was included in the Central Historic Core conservation area in 1968. The pub was refurbished in January 2025, and as of July 2025 the freehold is owned by Stonegate.

== History ==
The building was constructed on Monkgate in the late 18th century, according to its official listing, while The Yorkshire Post has given a date of 1799. An Inventory of the Historical Monuments in the City of York suggests a probable date of 1820. Its front was taken down and rebuilt in 1837 by order of York City Council "so as to form a line with the rampart wall". It was originally known as the Bay Horse Hotel, later became the Bay Horse public house, and was subsequently renamed The Keystones.

In 1968 the site was included within the newly established Central Historic Core conservation area, and on 19 August 1971, the Bay Horse was designated a Grade II listed building.

The pub was refurbished in January 2025, with the work including full redecoration and changes to the bar and seating area. As of July 2025, the freehold is owned by Stonegate Pub Company.

== Architecture ==
The building is made of brick, with painted stone details and a slate roof that slopes down on the right-hand side. It has a balanced front of three storeys and three bays. The main elevation includes corner features with alternating textures and two horizontal bands below the windows. The windows are sash types with painted lintels. On the ground floor, the windows have three sections, with plain lower panes and lintels formed from stepped blocks. The entrance has a simple classical surround with Doric-style uprights, a fanlight, and a six‑panel door. There are chimneys on the left and another set back on the right.

== See also ==
- Listed buildings in York (outside the city walls, northern part)
