= 29 Marygate =

Listed house in York, England

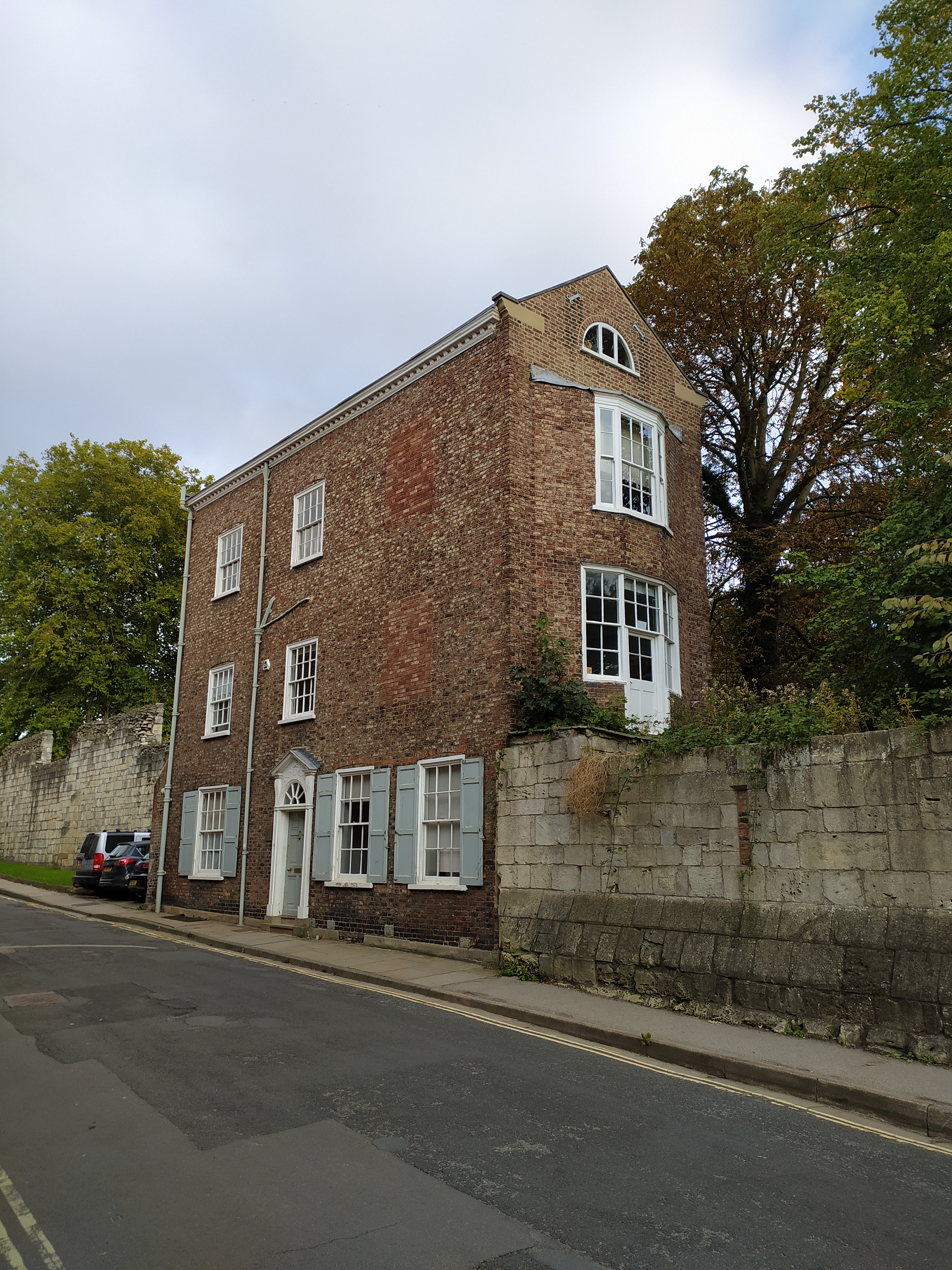
- The house in 2020
- Interactive map of the 29 Marygate area

General information
- Location: Marygate, York, England
- Coordinates: 53°57′46″N 1°05′20″W
- Completed: Early 18th century
- Renovated: 20th century (converted)

Technical details
- Floor count: 3 + cellar + attic

Design and construction
- Designations

Listed Building – Grade II*
- Official name: Number 29 and walls attached to south west
- Designated: 14 June 1954
- Reference no.: 1257374

29 Marygate is a historic house on Marygate, immediately north of the city centre of York, England.

The only house on the south-eastern side of Marygate, it incorporates part of the early 14th-century wall of St Mary's Abbey. The current building also incorporates small parts of an earlier house, of unknown date. The house was built in the early 18th century. It was converted into offices in the 20th century, and was Grade II* listed in 1954.

The house has three storeys, plus a basement and attic. It is narrow from front to back, and has just two rooms on each floor. The abbey wall is built of Magnesian Limestone, while the rest of the house has a stone ground floor and brick upper storeys, with a slate roof. The front has an early door and doorcase, with a radial fanlight above. Most windows are sashes, but some have been blocked, with the southwestern rooms on the upper floors instead lit by bay windows in the gable end. There is also a blocked doorway, in which a reused font has been placed.

Inside the house, many original features survive, including the main staircase, a first floor fireplace with decoration by Thomas Wolstenholme, and a decorated second-floor grate. One adjoining doorway into the former almonry of the abbey has been converted into a cupboard.

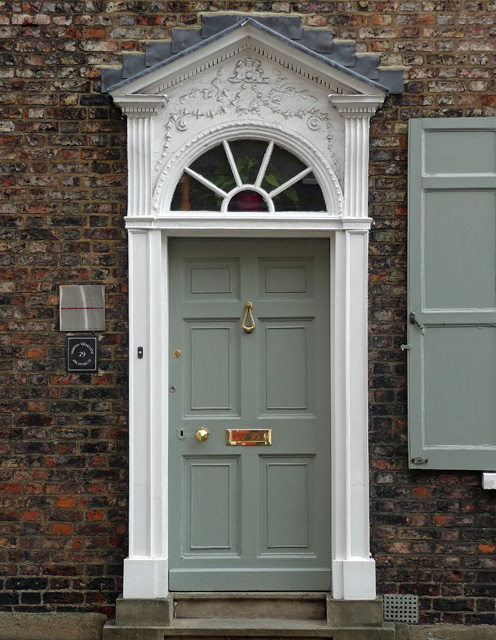
Main entrance to the house

== See also ==
- Grade II* listed buildings in the City of York
- Listed buildings in York (outside the city walls, northern part)
