= 47 Bootham =

Listed building in York, England

- The building in 2021
- Interactive map of the 47 Bootham area

General information
- Location: Bootham, York, England
- Coordinates: 53°57′51″N 1°05′14″W
- Completed: 1753
- Client: Mary Thompson

Technical details
- Floor count: 3 + cellar

Design and construction
- Architect: John Carr
- Designations

Listed Building – Grade II*
- Official name: Number 47 and attached railings
- Designated: 14 June 1954
- Reference no.: 1259463

47 Bootham is a historic building on Bootham, a street leading north from the city centre of York, England.

The house was commissioned by Mary Thompson, the widow of Edward Thompson. It was designed by John Carr, and was completed in 1753. After Mary's death, the house was purchased by Leonard Pickard, and it remained in his family until it was purchased by Bootham School, becoming part of the school premises. In the 19th century, the rear bay window was heightened to three storeys, and the second floor was partly remodelled. The building was Grade II* listed in 1954.

The house is built of brick, with painted stone dressings, and a slate roof. It has three storeys with a cellar, and is four bays wide. There are two stucco bands between the ground and first floors. The windows are sashes, and those on the ground floor have shutters. The front door is in the left bay, and it has a small window above, an architrave and a cornice. There is an original lead drainpipe, with a monogram, probably the initials of Mary Thompson. The chimney is central in the building.

The house retains most of its original fittings, including the cornices and architraves. The former dining room has panelling above a dado rail, a decorative frieze above the door, and an elaborate fireplace surround. The main staircase is original, and it has a Rococo ceiling above, the design incorporating foliage, the work described by Nikolaus Pevsner as "excellent". The saloon, at the front of the first floor, has an ornate fireplace with an overmantel depicting fruit, flowers and foliage. The servants' staircase is also original, and on the second floor, the queen post roof structure is visible.

== See also ==
- Grade II* listed buildings in the City of York
- Listed buildings in York (outside the city walls, northern part)
