= Old Grey Mare, York =

Listed pub in York, England

Old Grey Mare
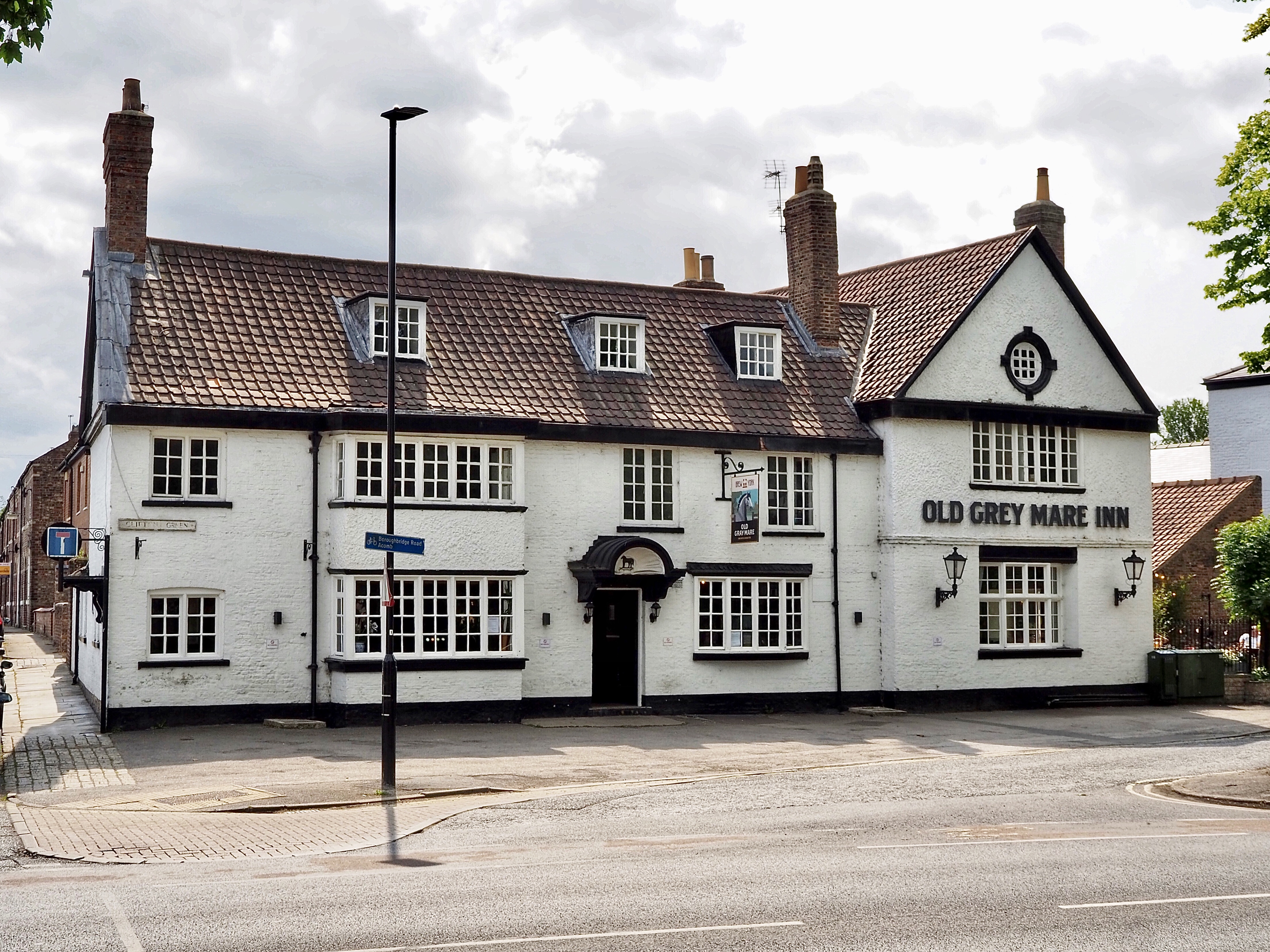
- The pub in 2025
- Former names: Grey Horse

General information
- Type: Public house
- Location: Clifton Green, Clifton, York, England
- Coordinates: 53.9690°N 1.0962°W
- Year built: Late 17th century
- Renovated: Late 19th century (added and altered) c. 2021–22 (refurbished)
- Owner: Brew York

Design and construction
- Designations

Listed Building – Grade II
- Official name: The Old Grey Mare public house
- Designated: 1 July 1968
- Reference no.: 1259205

Renovating team
- Architects: Walter Green Penty (late 19th century)

Website
- Official website

The Old Grey Mare is a Grade II listed public house on Clifton Green in Clifton, a suburb of York, England. Dating from the late 17th century, it is thought to stand on the site of an earlier inn, The Maypole, which was reportedly destroyed by fire in 1648. Known as the Grey Horse by 1820, the building was altered and extended over time, including late-19th‑century work by architect Walter Green Penty that added a gabled cross‑wing on the north side. The site became part of the Clifton conservation area in 1968. The pub is currently owned and operated by Brew York.

== History ==
The building has served as a public house since the late 17th century, and is believed to occupy the site of an earlier inn, The Maypole, which was reportedly destroyed by fire in 1648. By 1820 it was known as the Grey Horse. Its original 17th‑century structure was later altered and extended, including significant work in the late 19th century by architect Walter Green Penty, when a gabled cross‑wing was added on the north side.

On 1 January 1968, the site was included within the newly established Clifton conservation area, and on 1 July 1968, the Old Grey Mare was designated a Grade II listed building.

From 1986 to 2021, the pub was under the long‑term management of the same landlords. After a period of refurbishment, the Old Grey Mare reopened under new management in April 2022, before closing again in July 2024. It reopened in February 2025 after being taken over by new owners, Brew York.

== Architecture ==
The building is finished in painted brick, with some areas coated in roughcast, and has a pantile roof. It has two storeys and an attic. The front section includes a full‑height bay window with straight sides, containing five casement panes facing the street. To its left is one bay with windows set under shallow curved heads, each formed of two casement panes. To the right, the first floor has two windows of the same pattern. On the ground floor, beside the entrance, there is a slightly bowed casement window with four panes.

The attic is lit by three dormer windows with flat roofs, each fitted with horizontal sashes. Above the doorway is a decorative hood in a late‑17th‑century style, added in the late 19th century, supported by carved oak brackets shaped as dragons and featuring a relief of a grey mare.

A later cross‑wing stands to the right. Its ground floor has a recessed, angled casement window of four panes with a transom, and the first floor has a five‑pane casement window. The gable contains a small round window with a moulded surround. Timber gutters run along the main front and continue across the gable of the cross‑wing. Chimneys rise at the left end of the main range, at the junction with the cross‑wing, behind the ridge, and at the right end of the cross‑wing.

== See also ==
- Listed buildings in York (outside the city walls, northern part)
