= Burton Stone Inn =

Listed pub in York, England

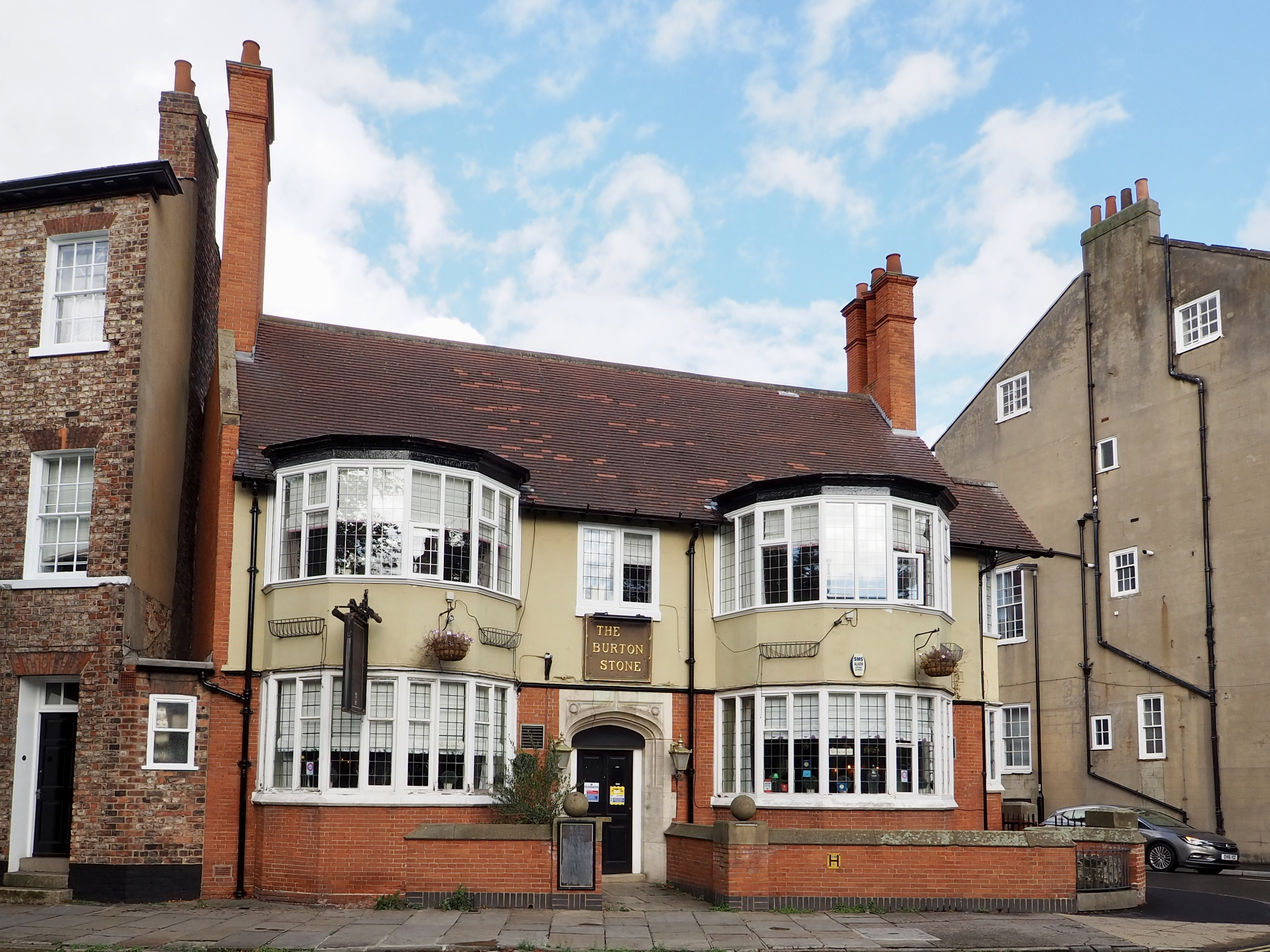
- The pub in 2021
- Interactive map of the Burton Stone Inn area

General information
- Type: Public house
- Location: Clifton, Clifton, York, England
- Coordinates: 53.9672°N 1.0930°W
- Year built: 1896; 130 years ago
- Owner: Heineken UK

Design and construction
- Architect: Walter Brierley
- Designations

Listed Building – Grade II
- Official name: The Burton Stone Inn and attached front wall
- Designated: 24 June 1983
- Reference no.: 1259197

Listed Building – Grade II
- Official name: The Burton Stone adjacent to the Burton Stone Inn
- Designated: 14 June 1954
- Reference no.: 1259198

The Burton Stone Inn is a Grade II listed public house and bed-and-breakfast on Clifton, in the suburb of Clifton in York, England. An inn on the site is first recorded in 1828, originally named The Plough before later taking the name the Burton Stone, after the medieval cross base that stands beside the building. The present inn was built in 1896 to designs by Walter Brierley.

== History ==
An inn on the site is first recorded in 1828, initially known as The Plough before later taking the name the Burton Stone. The present public house was built in 1896 to designs by Walter Brierley, replacing the earlier inn.

In 1968, the site was included within the newly established Clifton conservation area, and on 24 June 1983, the Burton Stone Inn and its front wall were designated a Grade II listed building.

In 2020, the Burton Stone Inn submitted a planning application to convert part of its ground‑floor pub space into three guest bedrooms. The restaurant and bar at the front were to be retained as pub areas, while the former pool‑table room was proposed for conversion. The pub already had several guest rooms at the time. As of June 2025, the pub's freehold is owned by Heineken UK.

== Architecture ==
The building is of brick, with the first floor finished in painted render and accented by stone dressings, all beneath a plain tile roof. Its symmetrical façade is dominated by two six‑sided, two‑storey bay windows with flat roofs. These contain leaded casement windows, each bay divided into six sides with two tall lights to each. Between the bays, a two‑light casement window on the first floor sits above a doorway framed by a moulded limestone surround with a Tudor arch. Chimneys rise to either side of the building. On the right‑hand return wall, a two‑storey, four‑sided bay window projects beneath a gable.

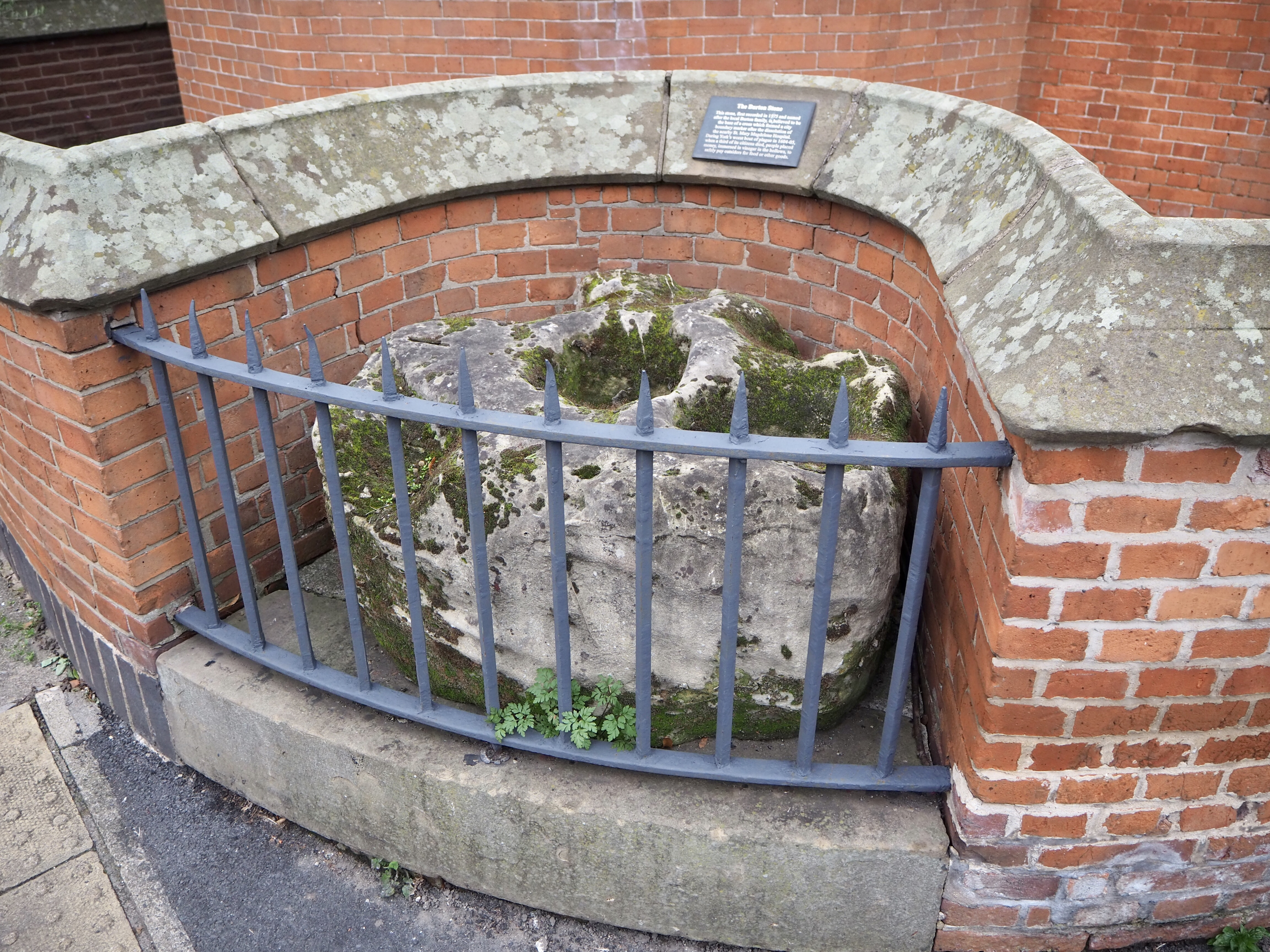
The wall and Burton Stone

=== Front wall and Burton Stone ===
In front of the pub is a curved low stone wall with stone coping and square piers topped by ball finials, and corner railings enclosing the Burton Stone, a medieval cross base that is also Grade II listed, with iron gates beyond. The stone cross base has a central socket for the cross‑shaft and four cup‑like depressions on its upper face, thought to indicate use as a barter stone during times of plague.

== See also ==
- Listed buildings in York (outside the city walls, northern part)
