= The Garth =

Listed building in York, England

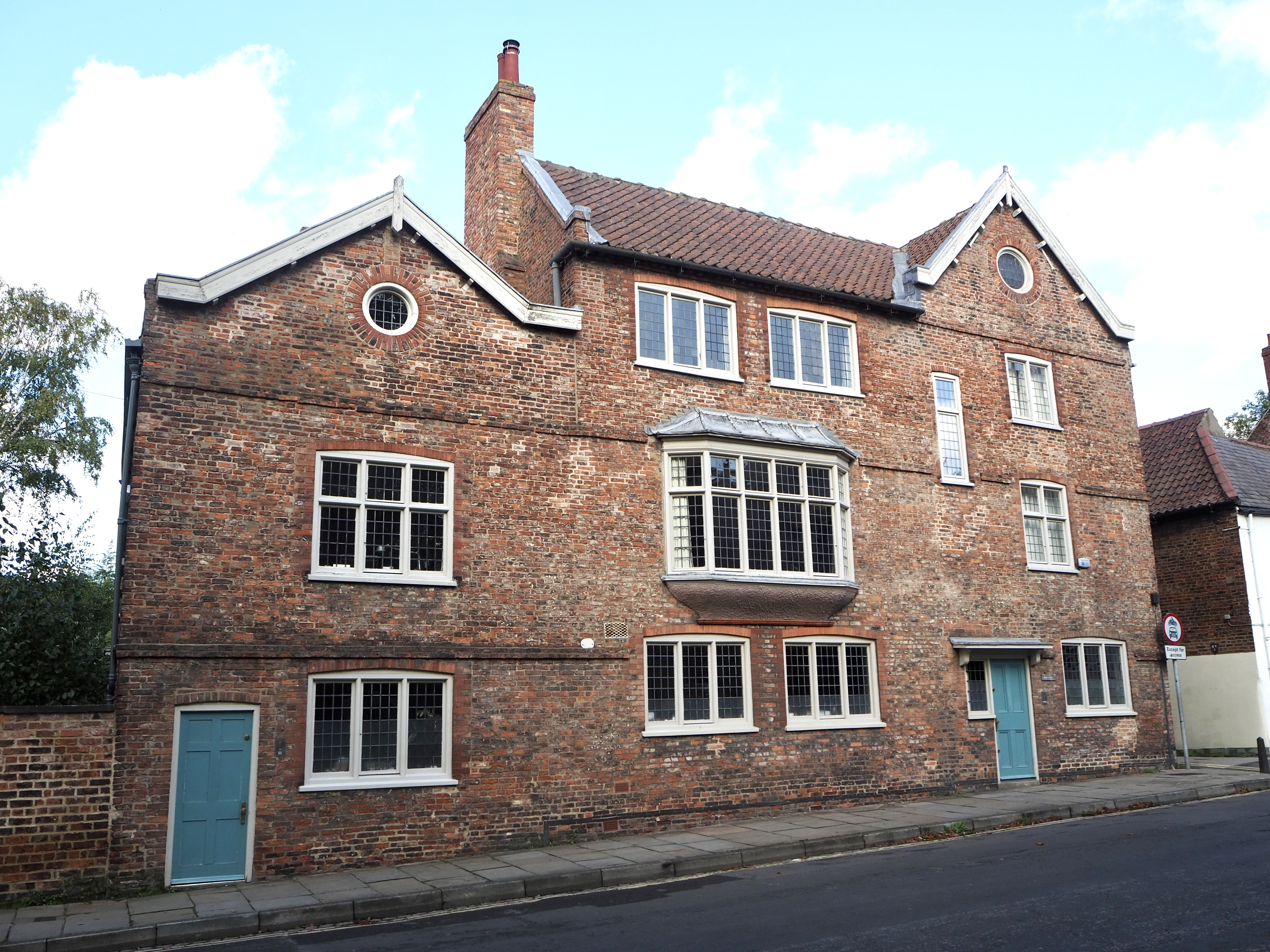
- The building in 2019
- Interactive map of the The Garth area
- Former names: Grey Coat School

General information
- Status: Converted into flats
- Type: Charity school (former)
- Location: 60 Marygate, York, England
- Coordinates: 53°57′44″N 1°05′24″W
- Year built: 1705; 321 years ago
- Renovated: Late 19th century (extensively altered); 1901 (refenestrated)

Design and construction
- Designations

Listed Building – Grade II
- Official name: The Garth
- Designated: 19 August 1971
- Reference no.: 1257382

The Garth is a historic building on Marygate, immediately north of the city centre of York, England.

The building was constructed in 1705 as the Grey Coat School, a charity school for girls. It accommodated up to 40 girls, who were fed, clothed and housed, and trained for domestic service. The school moved to Monkgate in 1784. In the late 19th century, the building was partly reconstructed, with many of the windows relocated. It was later divided into flats, with several of the larger rooms subdivided. The north-west end of the building is now a separate property, known as "Little Garth", and a small part of the structure has been incorporated into the neighbouring St Mary's Cottage. The building was Grade II listed in 1971.

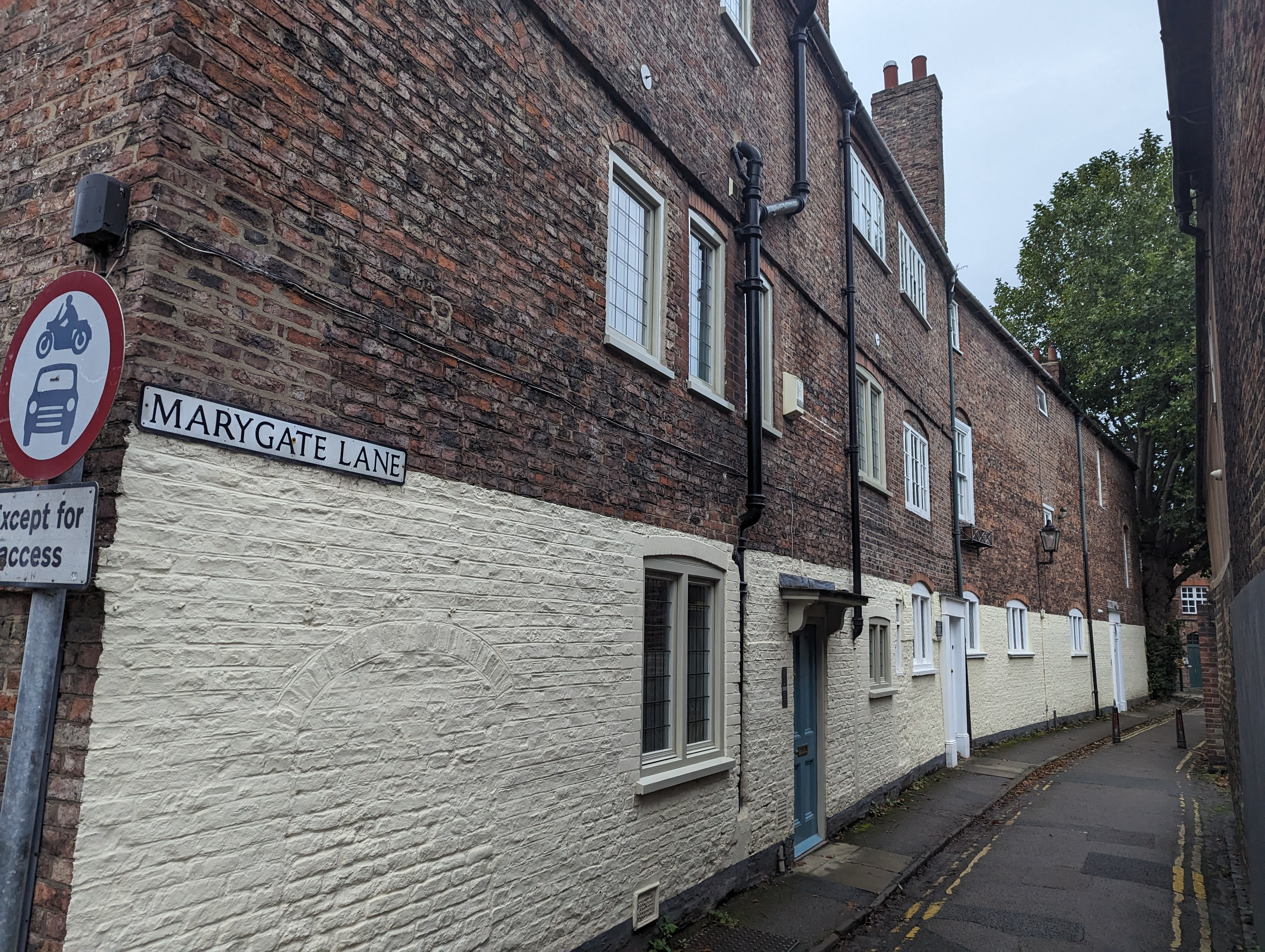
View along Marygate Lane, including The Garth

The building has an L-shaped plan. The central part has three storeys, the right-hand wing has three storeys with an attic, and the left-hand wing has two storeys with an attic. It is constructed of orange-brown brick, with a pantiled roof. The windows are in a variety of styles, including a large oriel window in the centre of the first floor and oculus windows to the attics. Above one of the doors to Marygate is part of a carved bargeboard, said to date from 1635 and to have been relocated from a house on High Ousegate. The facade on Marygate Lane retains some original windows, and the left-hand facade has an original entrance door. No early features survive inside the building.

== See also ==
- Listed buildings in York (outside the city walls, northern part)
