= 21 and 23 Bootham =

Listed building in York, England

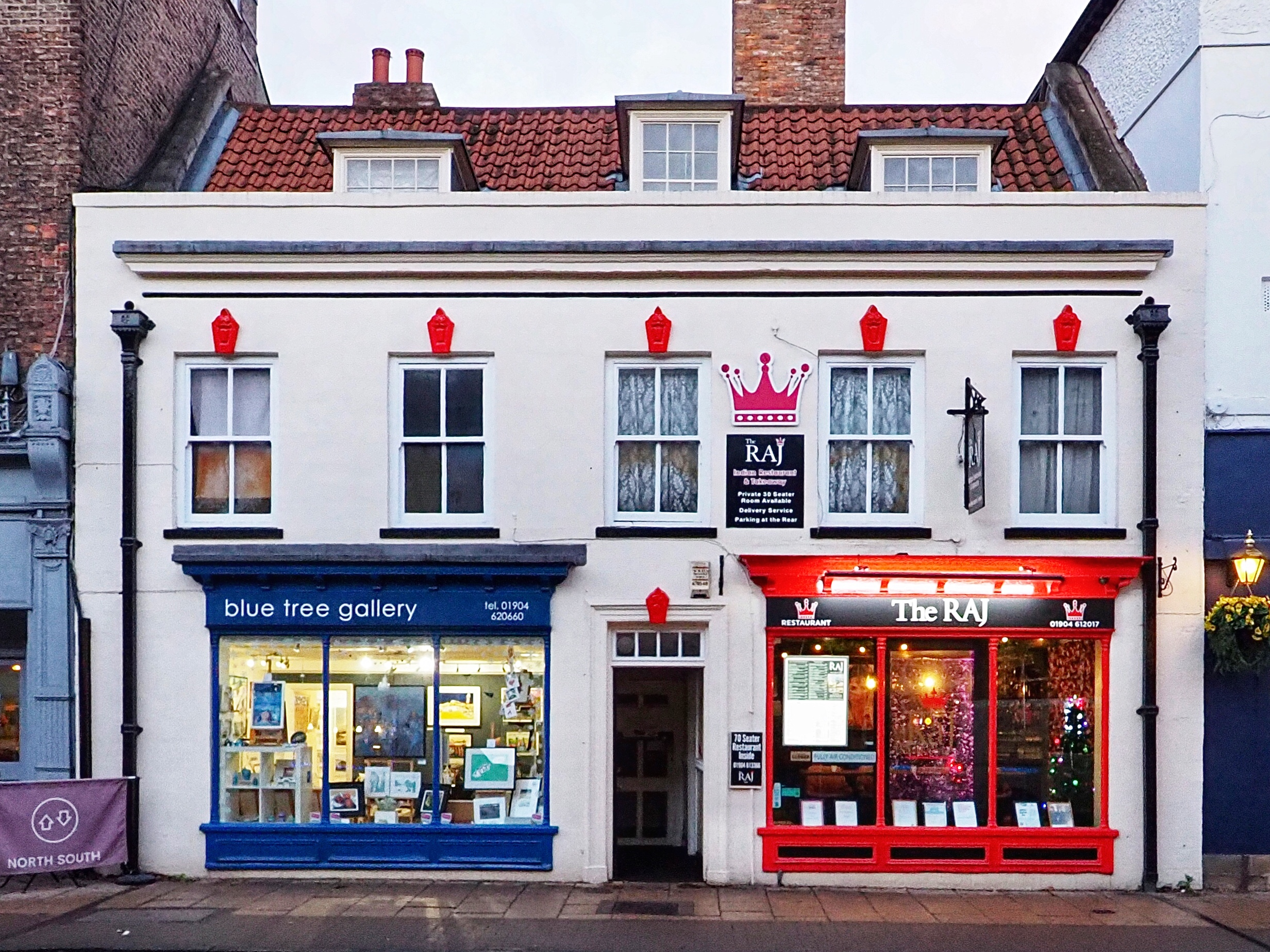
- The building in 2023

- Location within York City Centre

General information
- Location: York, England
- Coordinates: 53.96329°N 1.08576°W
- Year built: Late 17th century
- Renovated: 18th century (extended); 19th century (altered); 1992–93 (largely rebuilt and extended)

Listed Building – Grade II
- Official name: 21 and 23, Bootham
- Designated: 1 July 1968
- Reference no.: 1259476

21 and 23 Bootham is a historic building on Bootham, immediately north of the city centre of York, England.

The building was constructed in the late 17th century as a house with an L-shaped plan. An extension in the 18th century gave it a square plan, then in the 19th century the ground floor was converted into two shops, the upper windows enlarged, and the front plastered. Between 1992 and 1993 the building was extended and partly rebuilt. It has been Grade II listed since 1968.

The building is built of brick, that at the front being reused from an earlier structure, and the roofs are pantiled. It has two storeys and an attic, and is five windows wide. The original central doorway survives, flanked by 19th-century three-paned windows, while the first floor has sash windows, and there are three dormer windows in the attic. There are ornated drainpipes at each end. At the rear there are two bays, the one on the right being taller. Inside, the two front rooms on the first floor have their original plastered ceilings and wall paintings, a diaper pattern in blue and black. Historic England states that these are "said to be of good quality and technique and nationally comparatively rare. Nothing comparable survives in York".

== See also ==
- Listed buildings in York (outside the city walls, northern part)
