= St Olave's House =

Listed building in York, England

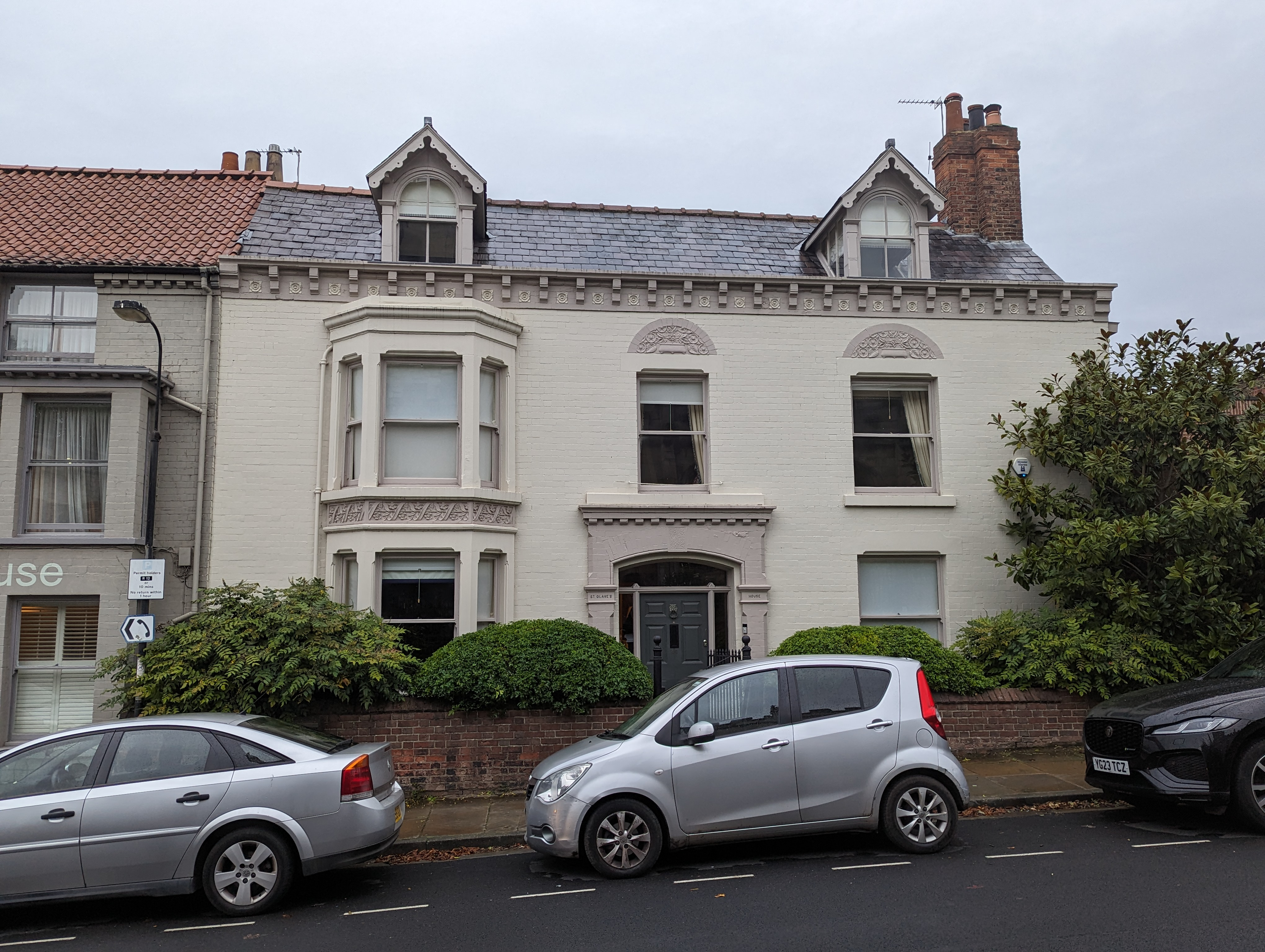
- The house in 2023
- Interactive map of the St Olave's House area

General information
- Location: 48 Marygate, York, England
- Coordinates: 53°57′45″N 1°05′22″W
- Year built: Late 17th century
- Renovated: Early 19th century (extended) c. 1900 (refronted); 20th century (altered)

Design and construction
- Designations

Listed Building – Grade II
- Official name: St Olaves House
- Designated: 14 March 1997
- Reference no.: 1257381

St Olave's House is a historic building on Marygate, immediately north of the city centre of York, England.

The building's origins lie in the early 17th century, but the oldest parts of the present structure date from later in the century. In the late 18th century, a separate building was erected behind the left-hand part of the house; in the early 19th century it was joined to St Olave's House and incorporated into it, with a chimney and bay window added. Around 1900, the front to Marygate was rebuilt. The house was Grade II listed in 1997. It was sold for £1.45 million in 2019, for £2.25 million in 2021, and placed on the market for £2.75 million in 2023. At that time, it was marketed as "York's best address", with an unusually large plot for its location, six bedrooms, and a walled garden.

The house is built of brick, painted at the front, with a slate roof to the front and pantile roofs elsewhere. It has two storeys with an attic. The front has a shallow porch, a two-storey bay window to the left, timber eaves with ceramic tiles depicting rosettes with leaves, and two dormer windows. The back of the north wing has an original gable, with a single-storey modern extension in front. Inside, most fittings are from the 18th and 19th centuries. The front right room includes part of the original fireplace, and the attic staircase is late 17th century, probably originally having been the main staircase.

A two-storey octagonal gazebo lies north-west of the house, originally in its garden but now in the garden of 6 Marygate Lane. It was built in the mid-19th century of Magnesian Limestone, with a slate roof and timber finial. The windows were replaced in the 20th century, and it was Grade II listed in 1983.

== See also ==
- Listed buildings in York (outside the city walls, northern part)
