= The Churchill Hotel, York =

Listed building in York, England

The Churchill Hotel
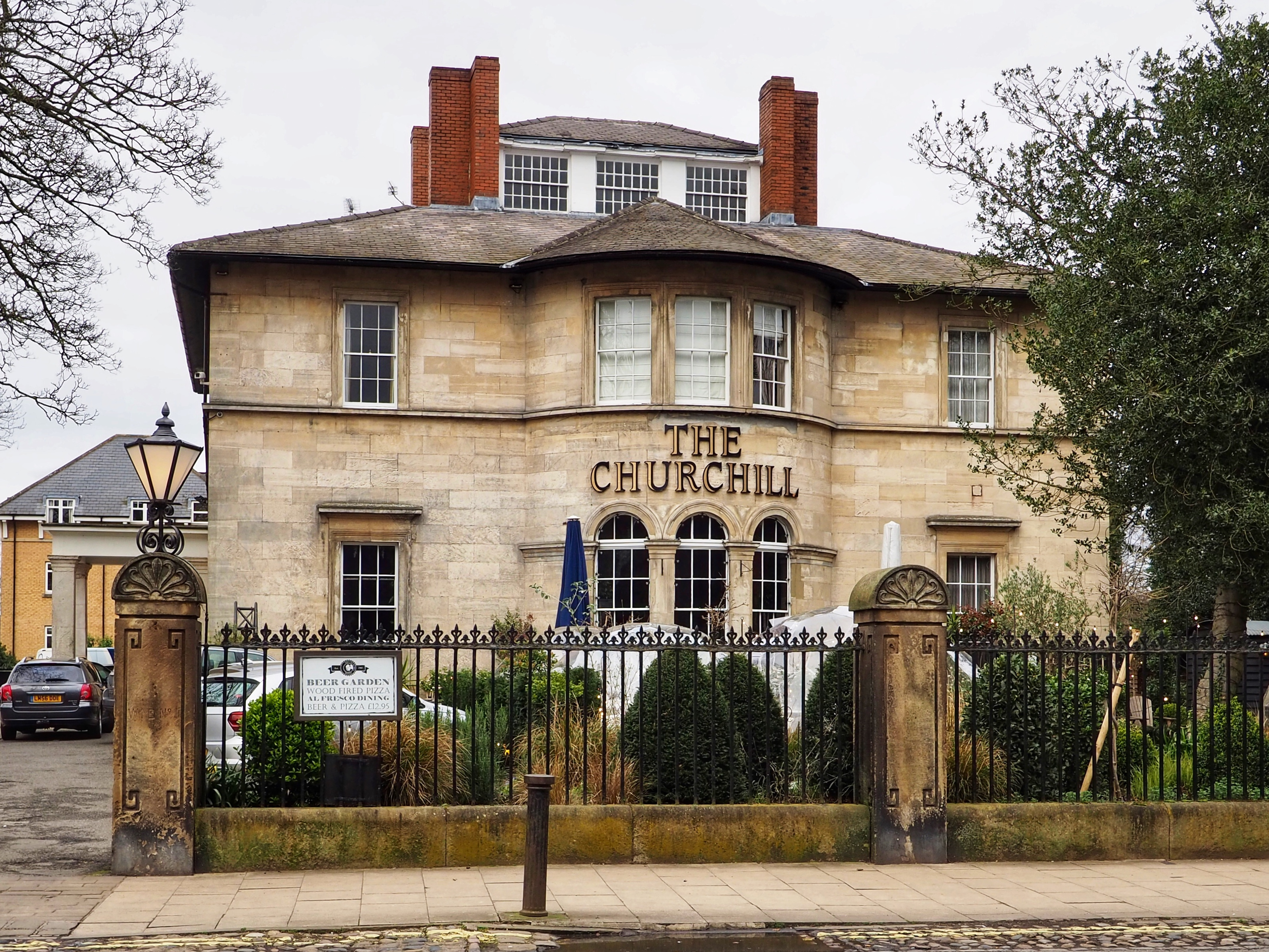
- The hotel in 2024
- Interactive map of the The Churchill Hotel area

General information
- Location: 65 Bootham, York, England
- Coordinates: 53°57′54″N 1°05′20″W
- Completed: c. 1827
- Renovated: 1879 (converted to school); Late 19th century (converted to offices); 1985 (converted to hotel); 2006 (extended)
- Client: Barbara Ashton Nelson

Technical details
- Floor count: 2 + cellar + attic

Design and construction
- Designations

Listed Building – Grade II*
- Official name: The Churchill
- Designated: 19 August 1971
- Reference no.: 1259444

Website
- churchillhotel.com

The Churchill Hotel is a historic building on Bootham, north of the city centre of York, England.

The building was constructed in about 1827 as a house, for Barbara Ashton Nelson. It replaced an earlier house, but was set further back from the road. In 1879, it was converted into a girls' school, named Bootham House. In 1882, it was sold to the War Department, becoming the official residence of the General Officer Commanding Northern District. It later became government offices, housing the Command Pay Office, then the Health Authority, and finally Customs and Excise, until 1984. In 1985, it was converted into a 14-bedroom hotel, which in 2006 was extended to provide 32 bedrooms. It has been Grade II* listed since 1971.

The house has a sandstone facade, with white-brick side walls, and a red-brick rear wall. It has two main storeys, plus an attic and cellar. The three-bay symmetrical facade has a central bowed bay, while the windows are sashes. There is a timber lantern above the centre of the roof, with three windows, and a chimney at each corner. The main entrance is in the left wall, under a porte-cochère. Inside, the stair hall rises the full height of the building, and is lit by the lantern. There is some original plasterwork, and a curved white marble fireplace in the central front downstairs room.

== See also ==
- Grade II* listed buildings in the City of York
- Listed buildings in York (outside the city walls, northern part)
