= 53 and 55 Bootham =

Listed building in York, England

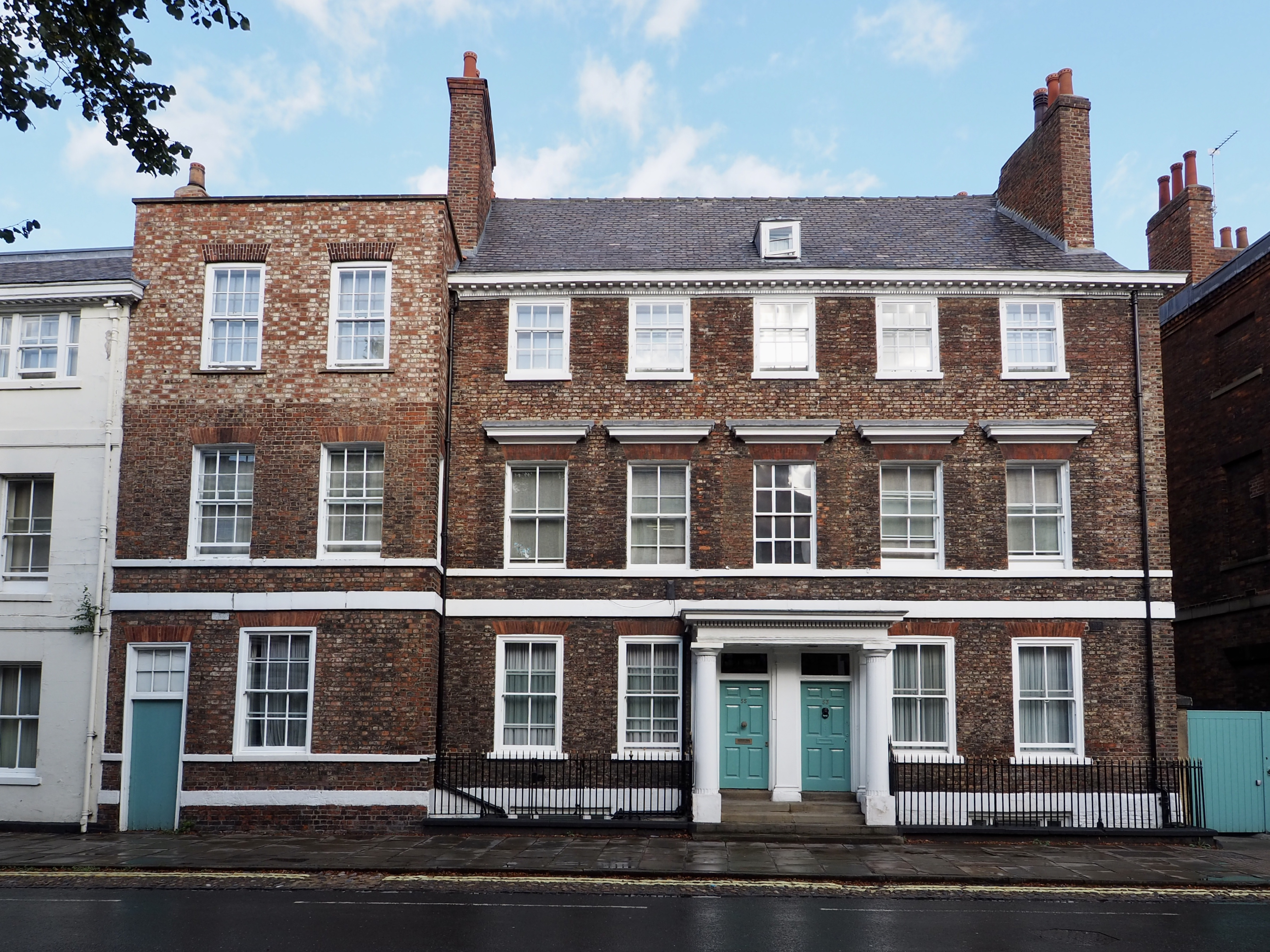
- The building in 2021
- Interactive map of the 53 and 55 Bootham area

General information
- Location: Bootham, York, England
- Coordinates: 53°57′52″N 1°05′16″W
- Completed: c. 1765
- Renovated: c. 1770 (divided); Early 19th century (extended and porch added)

Technical details
- Floor count: 3 + cellar + attic

Design and construction
- Architect: John Carr (probable)
- Designations

Listed Building – Grade II*
- Official name: Numbers 53 and 55 and attached railings
- Designated: 14 June 1954
- Reference no.: 1259432

53 and 55 Bootham is a historic building on Bootham, immediately north of the city centre of York, England.

The building was constructed as a single house in about 1765, probably to a design by John Carr. In about 1770, it was divided to form a pair of houses. Early in the 19th century, No. 55 was extended to the left. In 1923, the house was purchased by Bootham School, which came to use it as offices. The building was Grade II* listed in 1954.

The building is constructed of brick, with stone and stucco dressings, and a slate roof. The main part of the front is symmetrical, with three main storeys, an attic and a cellar, and it is five bays wide. The brickwork of the top floor is different to that of the lower floors, suggesting that it may be a later addition. A porch in a Greek Doric style covers the twin entrance doors, which each lead into an entrance hall, which widens to accommodate a staircase; that in No. 53 has been removed, but the original staircase in No. 55 survives. Much of the original cornice survives, as does one fireplace. The extension has an additional external door, which leads to a passageway.

== See also ==
- Grade II* listed buildings in the City of York
- Listed buildings in York (outside the city walls, northern part)
