= 26 and 28 Gillygate =

Listed building in York, England

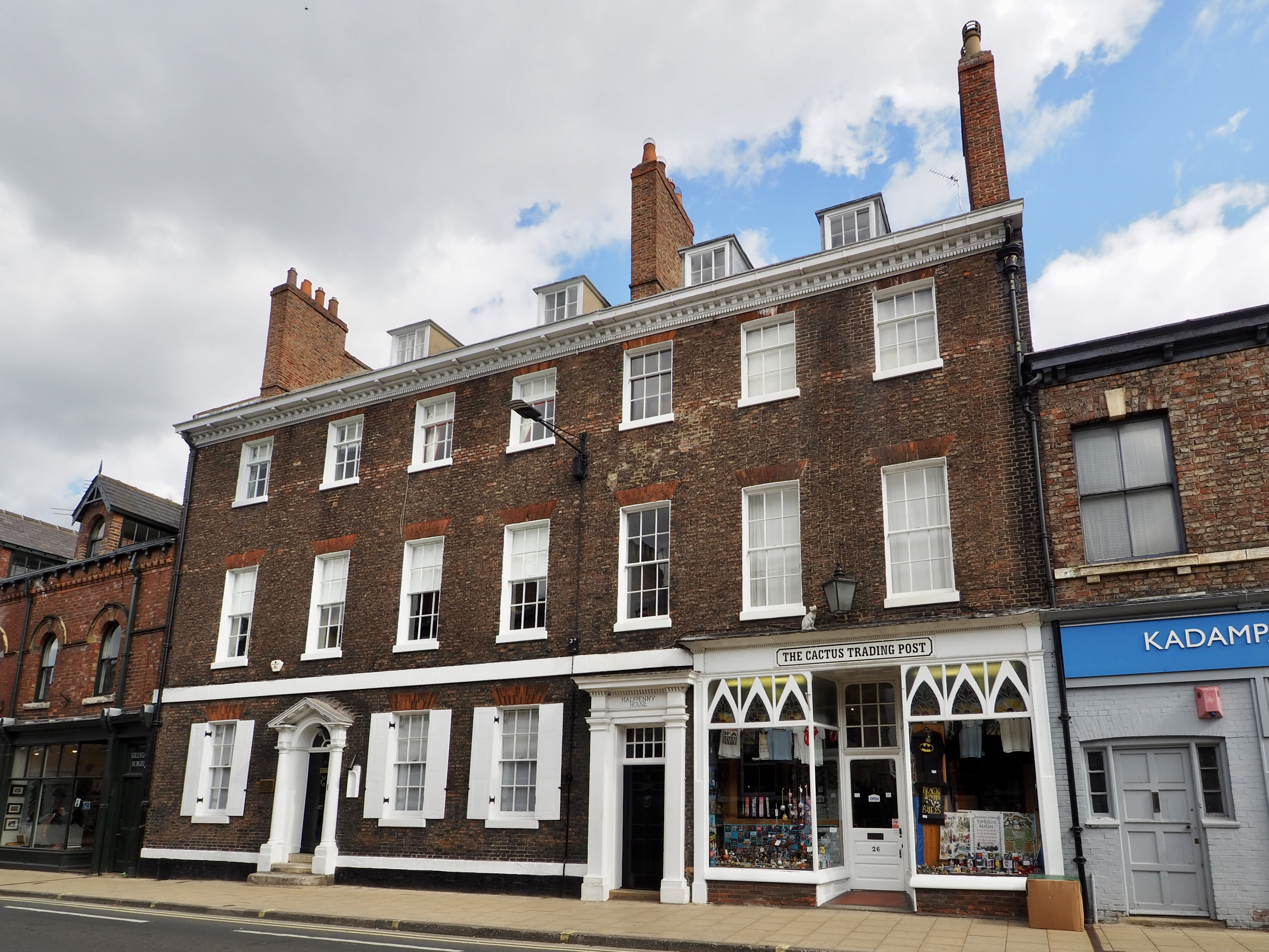
- The building in 2021
- Interactive map of the 26 and 28 Gillygate area

General information
- Location: Gillygate, York, England
- Coordinates: 53°57′49″N 1°05′04″W
- Year built: 1769
- Renovated: 19th and 20th centuries (altered)

Listed Building – Grade II*
- Official name: 26 and 28, Gillygate
- Designated: 14 June 1954
- Reference no.: 1257782

26 and 28 Gillygate is a historic building on Gillygate, immediately north of the city centre of York, England.

The buildings on the south side of Gillygate were destroyed during the Siege of York in 1644. New buildings were gradually constructed over the next century, but the oldest surviving building is 26 and 28 Gillygate. It was built in 1769 by Robert Clough, and the following year, the two houses were let to Francis Smyth and Colonel Robert Prescott. The building was altered in the 19th and 20th centuries, the work including the insertion of a 19th-century shopfront to No. 26, and the replacement of the windows at the front in the 20th century. The building has been Grade II* listed since 1954, the only building with this grade on the street. No. 28 served as a doctors' surgery for many years, but in 2015 was converted back into a private house, named Gillygate House.

The building is constructed of brick, with painted stone dressings and a slate roof. It has three storeys and is seven bays wide, with No. 26 occupying the three right-hand bays, and No. 28 occupying the other four. There are sash windows and four dormer windows in the attic. The two right-hand bays contain the glazed wooden shopfront, while the third bay from the right has an early-19th-century doorway with Tuscan pilasters. The second bay from the left has an original door in a similar style, with a candle snuffer to its right. At the right-hand side, there is a drainpipe, with a head dated 1770. At the rear, both houses have a small three-storey wing containing closets, and there are round-headed staircase windows.

Inside, No. 26 has its original staircase and many original cornices. The first floor has numerous 19th-century fittings and an original fireplace. The original staircase also survives in No. 28, while one of the front rooms and first floor saloon have rococo plasterwork ceilings. Some of the fireplaces were designed by Thomas Wolstenholme.

== See also ==
- Grade II* listed buildings in the City of York
- Listed buildings in York (outside the city walls, northern part)
