= 3 and 5 Gillygate =

Listed building in York, England

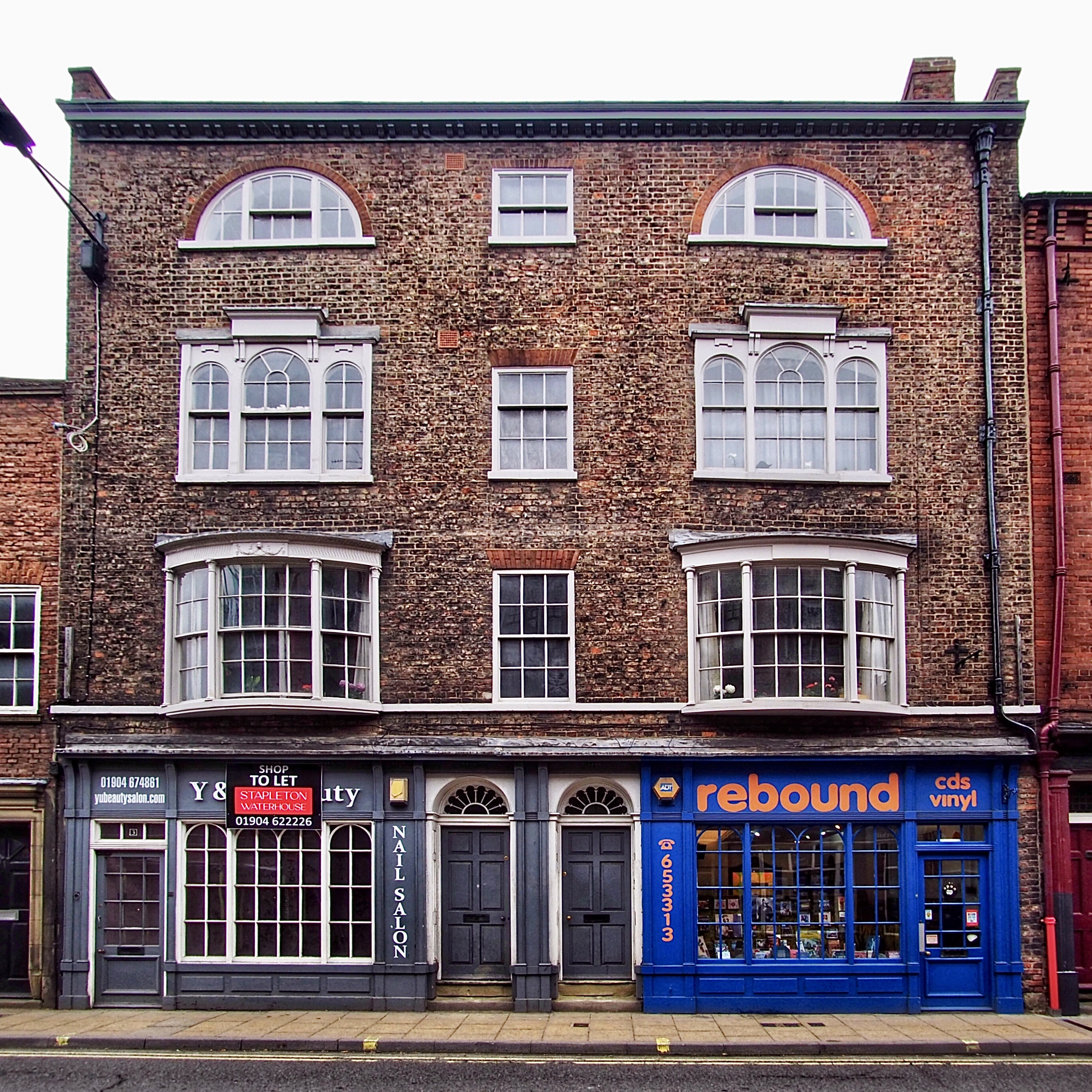
- The building in 2023

- Location within York City Centre

General information
- Location: Gillygate, York, England
- Coordinates: 53°57′48″N 1°05′07″W
- Year built: 1797
- Renovated: c. 1980 (altered and restored)

Design and construction
- Main contractor: Thomas Wolstenholme

Listed Building – Grade II
- Official name: 3 and 5, Gillygate
- Designated: 14 June 1954
- Reference no.: 1257779

3 and 5 Gillygate is a historic building on Gillygate, immediately north of York city centre, England.

The building, on the northwest side of the street, was constructed in 1797 by Thomas Wolstenholme. Wolstenholme was a carver, and undertook much of the internal decoration himself. He built it as a pair of houses, occupying number 3 himself. It was passed down in the family until 1887. The ground floor of both houses were then converted to shops, the interiors being refitted, and shop fronts inserted. The shopfronts were replaced around 1980, when the whole building was restored. The building has been Grade II listed since 1954. Nikolaus Pevsner described it as the "best building" on the street.

The building is constructed of brick, with a pantile roof. It has four storeys and is three bays wide. There are sash windows on all floors at the rear, while at the front there is variety: plain sashes in the centre bay, flanked on the first floor by bay windows, on the second floor sashes with three round heads and cornices above, and on the third floor by Diocletian windows. The ground floor has timber shopfronts either side of paired doors with fanlights, one being original and the other 20th century. The upper storeys retain most of their original decoration including friezes, decorative pilasters flanking windows and doorways, fireplace surrounds, and further decorative panels.

== See also ==
- Listed buildings in York (outside the city walls, northern part)
