= St Thomas' Church, York =

St Thomas' Church
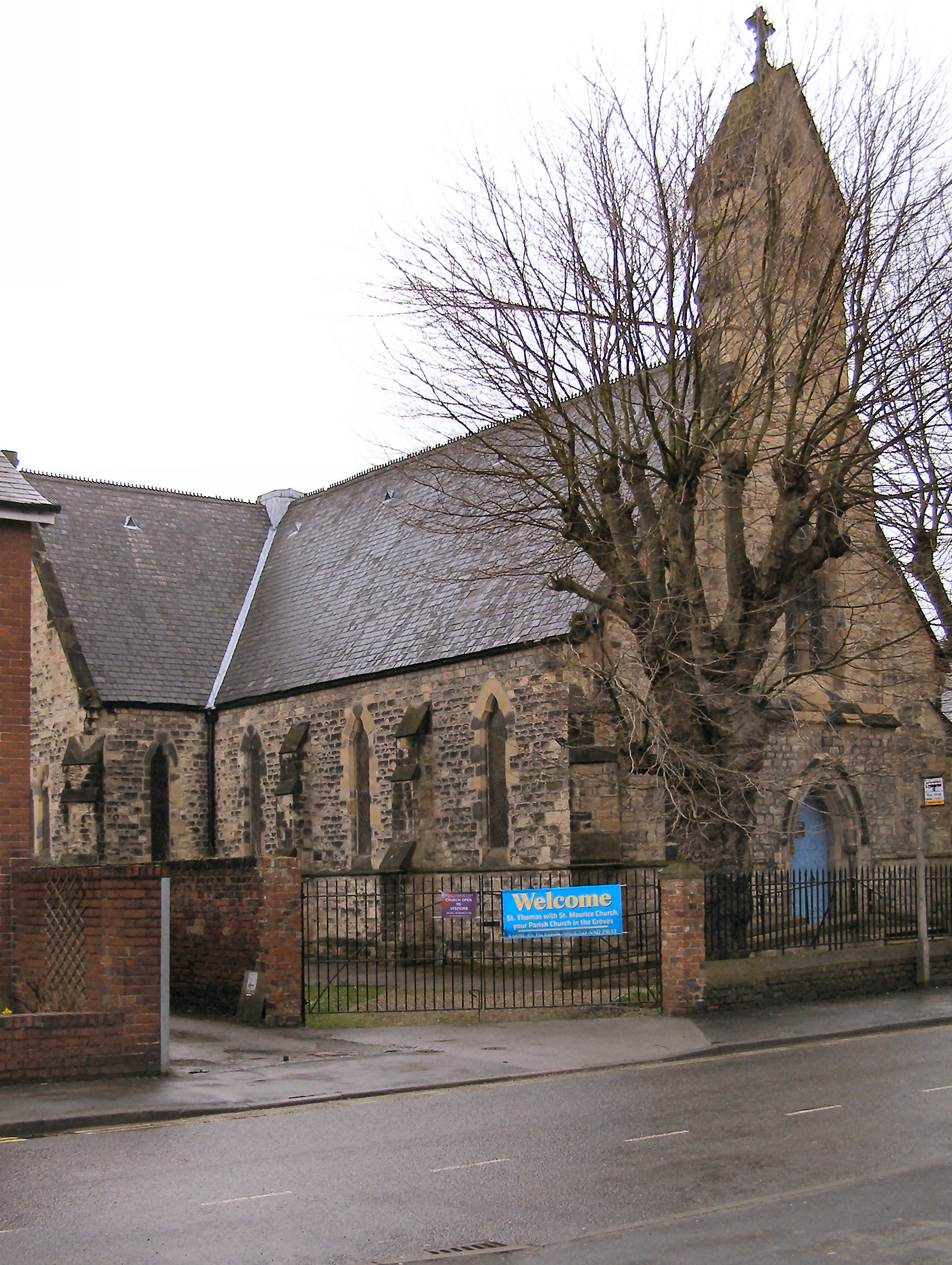
- The church, in 2010
- St Thomas' Church
- 53.96781°N 1.07954°W
- OS grid reference: SE 60485 52804
- Location: York, North Yorkshire
- Address: Lowther Street, York
- Country: England
- Denomination: Church of England
- Website: www.stthomaswithstmaurice.org.uk

History
- Status: Active
- Dedication: Saint Thomas
- Consecrated: 22 August 1854

Architecture
- Architect: George Fowler Jones
- Style: Gothic Revival
- Groundbreaking: 1853
- Construction cost: £2,500

Specifications
- Materials: Sandstone

Administration
- Province: York
- Diocese: York
- Archdeaconry: York
- Deanery: York

St Thomas' Church is a parish church in the Groves area of York, a city in England. It is sometimes known as St Thomas' in the Groves.

The Groves area, in the parish of St Olave's Church, York, was built up in the mid 19th century. It was decided to construct a new church in the area. A building was designed by George Fowler Jones, and constructed between 1853 and 1854. The work cost £2,500, and the completed church, in the Gothic revival style, could seat 500 worshippers. The church was given its own parish in 1855, and was enlarged in 1899. The church was grade II listed in 1997. In 2014, it was added to the Heritage at Risk Register due to severe erosion to some of its stonework.

The church is built of sandstone with slate roofs. It consists of a three-bay nave, two-bay north and south transepts, and a two-bay chancel. The west end has a gable and its central bay projects slightly, supporting a bellcote and cross. There is an arched doorway, with windows either side, and a two-light window above. The nave has buttresses with windows in each bay, while the transepts have two-light windows and a circular window in the gable end. The east window has three lights.
