= 11 Lady Peckett's Yard =

Listed building in York, England

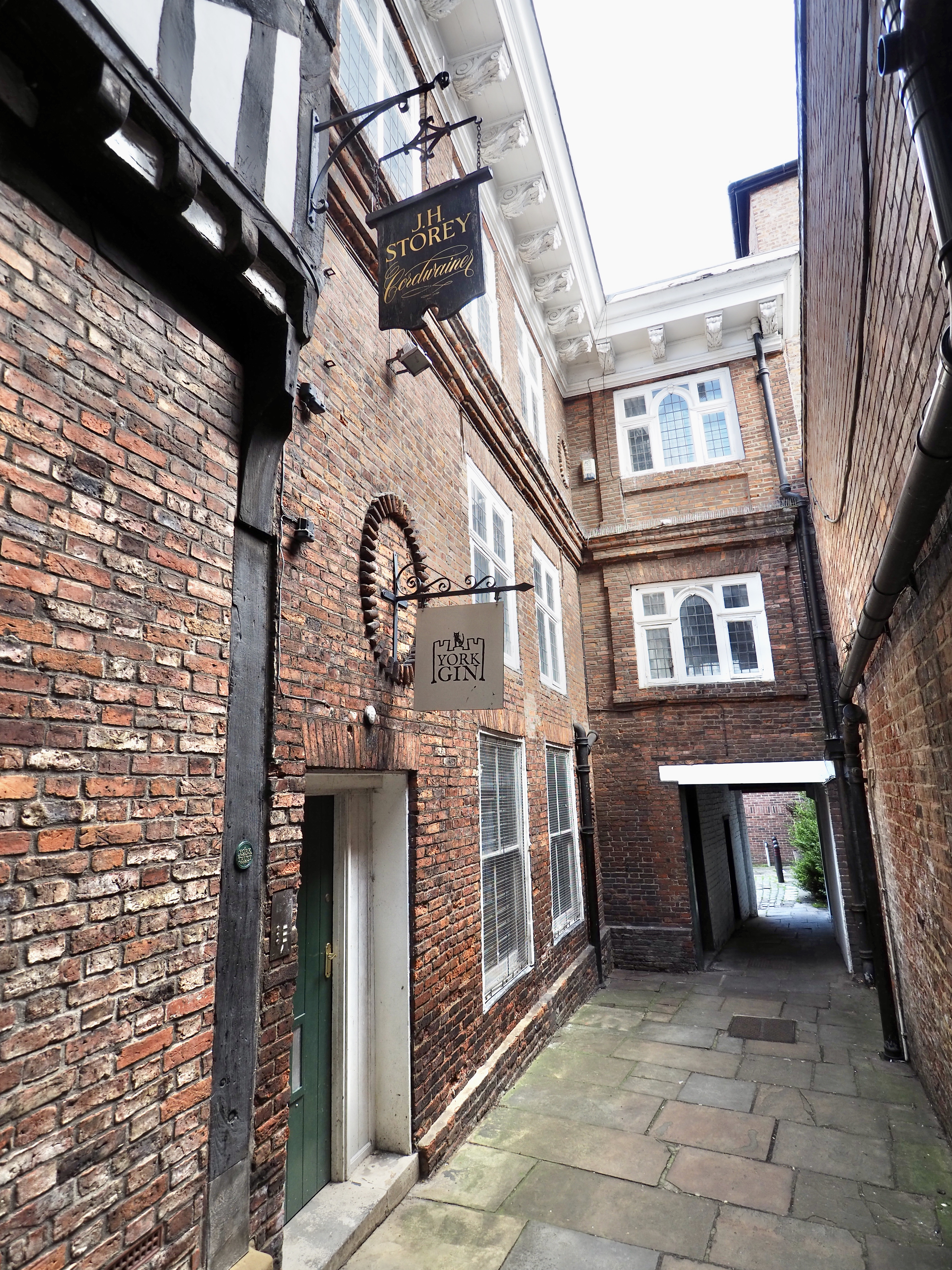
- The building in 2022
- Interactive map of the 11 Lady Peckett's Yard area

General information
- Status: Converted to commercial and residential use
- Type: House (former)
- Location: York, England
- Coordinates: 53.9584°N 1.0794°W
- Year built: 15th century
- Renovated: c. 1700 (rebuilt and extended); Late 19th century (extended); Early 20th century (altered and partly rebuilt)
- Owner: York Conservation Trust

Website
- Official website

Listed Building – Grade II*
- Official name: 11, Lady Peckitts Yard
- Designated: 14 June 1954
- Reference no.: 1257535

11 Lady Peckett's Yard is a Grade II* listed building in the city of York, England. It originated as two 15th‑century houses forming part of the rear ranges of Sir Thomas Herbert's House on Pavement, and was rebuilt around 1700 for John Peckett, who was Lord Mayor in 1702. The snickelway took its name in the 18th century from Peckett's wife, Alice Pawson. The building was used as a pawnbroker's from the late 18th century into the early 20th century, later saw a variety of commercial uses, and is now owned by the York Conservation Trust.

== History ==
The building began as two 15th‑century houses forming part of the rear ranges of Sir Thomas Herbert's House on Pavement. It was rebuilt and enlarged around 1700 for John Peckett, who served as Lord Mayor in 1702, and later gained a further extension in the late 19th century. Additional alterations and partial rebuilding took place in the early 20th century. Peckett's surname appears in early records with several spellings, including "Peckitt" and "Peckett", and the snickelway seems to have taken the name "Lady Peckett's Yard" in the 18th century from his wife Alice Pawson, who continued to live in the house following his death in 1707. The spelling "Lady Peckitts Yard" in the official listing is possibly a typographical error.

By the late 18th century, No. 11 was occupied by George Fettes, a Methodist and pawnbroker. In 1828 the property was purchased by the father‑in‑law of the tenant, Henry Hardcastle. The building continued in use as a pawnbroker's throughout the 19th century and into the early 20th century, with newspapers frequently referring to Wood's and J. Hardcastle & Sons operating from the site.

On 14 June 1954, No. 11 was designated a Grade II* listed building, and in 1968 the site was included within the newly established Central Historic Core conservation area.

In the later 20th century, the building saw a variety of uses, including retail businesses such as a cordwainer, a hairdresser, and a bar. The ground floor was eventually absorbed into the storage and staff areas of Clarks, and later Jones the Bootmaker. The upper floors were converted into flats during the same period. The site is now owned by the York Conservation Trust.

== Architecture ==
The building has a timber-framed core set on a chamfered brick base, with the front rebuilt in orange‑red brick and finished with a timber cornice, and the rear in a different brick pattern. A 19th‑century addition was built in orange brick, and later changes used various brick types. It has a pantile roof with brick chimneys. The front is three storeys and L‑shaped, with a 15th‑century section to the right and a three‑bay wing to the left. The wing includes a modern door, two small sash windows, and a round glazed opening in a decorative brick surround; the upper floors have square lattice casement windows. All openings have flat brick arches, and the second‑floor windows sit beneath a prominent moulded cornice on carved brackets. There are also blind round openings in matching brick surrounds.

A heavy brick cornice runs below the second floor and continues across the older range. The 15th‑century part has a snickelway at ground level, and above it a tall brick panel contains a Venetian‑style window on each floor. The eaves cornice continues from the wing. The rear of both sections has modern doors and cross windows with lattice casements, while the extension has small sash windows with stone sills and cambered brick arches on the upper floors.

=== Interior ===
The wing contains a staircase running from the ground floor to the attic, with shaped detailing, turned balusters and square newels. The stairwell and upper passages have dado panelling. A blocked doorway with a frieze stands at the foot of the stairs, and a two‑panel door sits on the mid‑landing. The ground‑floor room is fully panelled and includes a semi-circular cupboard in an arched surround. On the first floor, a two‑panel door leads to the passage, and the doorway into the older range has a frieze and hood. The second‑floor room has panelled walls, a fireplace with a frieze and overmantel, and a cupboard on traditional hinges. The roof uses cranked trusses. In the 15th‑century range, the first floor shows exposed framing, including a dragon beam, joists and a chamfered beam, and a plastered fireplace with a chamfered segmental arch.

== See also ==
- Grade II* listed buildings in the City of York
- Listed buildings in York (within the city walls, southern part)
