= 69 and 71 Micklegate =

Listed building in York, England

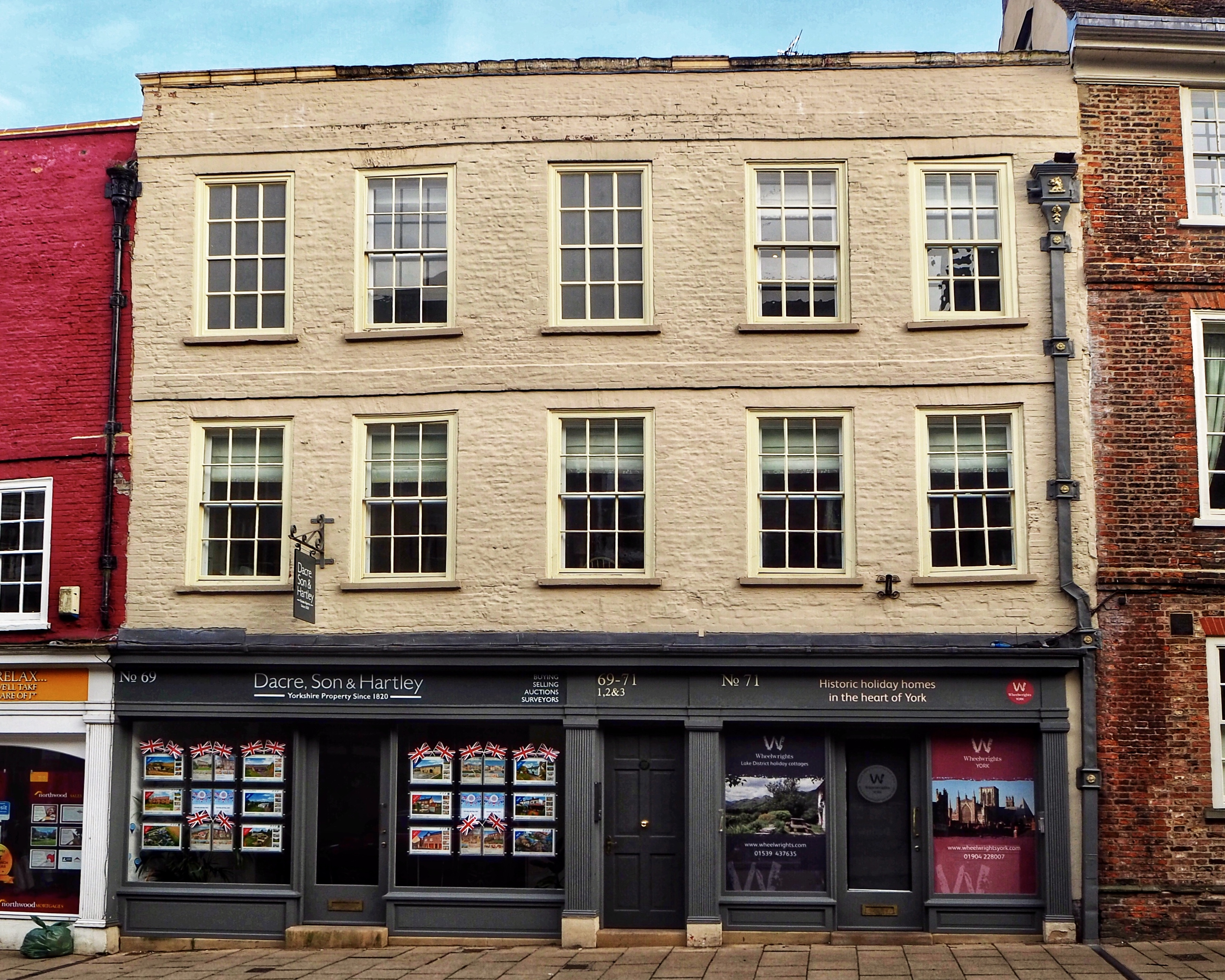
- The building in 2023
- Interactive map of the 69 and 71 Micklegate area
- Former names: Minster Inn (No. 71)

General information
- Status: Converted to commercial premises and holiday apartments
- Type: House (former)
- Location: Micklegate, York, England
- Coordinates: 53.9571°N 1.0884°W
- Year built: Early 17th century
- Renovated: c. 1745 (largely rebuilt); 19th and 20th centuries (altered and extended)
- Owner: York Conservation Trust

Listed Building – Grade II*
- Official name: 69 and 71, Micklegate
- Designated: 14 June 1954
- Reference no.: 1257312

69 and 71 Micklegate is a Grade II* listed building on Micklegate in the city of York, England. Built in the early 17th century as a timber‑framed house, it was extensively remodelled around 1745 for the Revd Philemon Marsh, with a new brick front and major internal alterations. The western part, No. 71, later operated as the Minster Inn until 1830, and further changes in the 19th and 20th centuries added rear extensions and shopfronts. It was included in the Central Historic Core conservation area in 1968. York Conservation Trust bought it in 2014 and carried out a major refurbishment, creating commercial space on the ground floor of No. 69 and holiday apartments above. It stands between the Grade II*‑listed No. 67 and the Grade II-listed Nos. 73–75.

== History ==
The building on Micklegate began as a timber‑framed house in the early 17th century. It later became the home of Samuel Dawson, sheriff in 1718–19. The building was extensively remodelled in about 1745 for the Revd Philemon Marsh, then rector of St Martin‑cum‑Gregory's Church, with a new brick front, a prominent staircase with a lantern, and other internal changes; the original roof remained behind the later façade. The western part, No. 71, operated as the Minster Inn, recorded in 1736 and continuing until 1830. The house was advertised for sale in 1794, when it was occupied by Marsh's widow. Further alterations followed, including additions at the rear and the conversion of the ground floor to shops. Later work in the 19th and 20th centuries added a rear extension and other changes.

On 14 June 1954, Nos. 69–71 were designated a Grade II* listed building, and in 1968 the site was included within the newly established Central Historic Core conservation area. It stands between the Grade II*-listed No. 67, and Nos. 73–75, which are listed at Grade II.

In 2014 York Conservation Trust bought the building, by which time it had been empty for a long period and was in poor condition. In November 2015, planning permission and listed building consent were granted to turn the property into three apartments, two small commercial units, and a separate house in the rear courtyard. Before starting the main refurbishment, the Trust carried out a preliminary phase of work to remove later additions, expose the underlying structure, and complete the required archaeological investigations.

The project then proceeded with the renovation of the two ground‑floor commercial units and the conversion of the rest of the building to residential use, aiming to preserve earlier features and reinstate parts of the historic layout. The upper floors were arranged as three apartments, and a later rear extension was demolished to create a shared outdoor space. A separate two‑bedroom house, designed in a late‑19th‑century style, was built at the back of the site.

The ground floor of No. 69 is now used as commercial premises, while the upper floors of the building have been converted into three holiday apartments.

== Architecture ==
The building is timber‑framed but now enclosed in brick laid in Flemish bond, with the front painted. A plain parapet with stone coping hides the parallel roofs, which are gabled to the street and have brick stacks at the rear. The rear wing of No. 69 has a hipped slate roof; the rear wing of No. 71 is not visible.

The front has three storeys and five windows. Both ground‑floor units have shopfronts with fluted pilasters and a cornice, and glazed doors set back between half‑canted plate‑glass windows. All upper‑floor windows are 12‑pane sashes under painted flat brick arches with painted stone sills; the end and centre windows on the second floor are blind. Single‑course raised bands mark the second floor and parapet. Original rainwater goods survive at the right end, including a rectangular hopper with the Marsh family unicorn crest.

At the rear, No. 71 has a tripartite sash with a 16‑pane centre light. Other first and second‑floor windows to both houses have segmental arches. A rainwater head dated 1674 also survives.

=== Interior ===
Inside, parts of the timber frame were visible at the rear of the ground‑floor front rooms and in the first‑floor rear room of No. 71.

In No. 69, the main ground‑floor feature was a cantilevered staircase rising around a tall open well lined with dado panelling and lit from above by a roof lantern set in a coved ceiling. The rear room retained reused 17th‑century panelling and a moulded cornice. In No. 71, a fluted pilaster marking a former arch survived at the foot of the transverse stair, and both front and back rooms kept fragments of moulded and dentilled cornices.

On the first floor of No. 69, the secondary stair had turned balusters and square newels, and a keyed round arch stood at the head of the main stair. The front room had a moulded cornice and a cased beam, while the rear room had an eight‑panel door. In No. 71, a closed‑string stair with stick balusters rose to the second floor, boxed in below with reused 17th‑century panelling. The front room had intersecting cased beams carried on a fluted Doric column, and the rear room retained a moulded cornice.

== See also ==
- Grade II* listed buildings in the City of York
- Listed buildings in York (within the city walls, southern part)
