= The Red House (York) =

Listed building in York, England

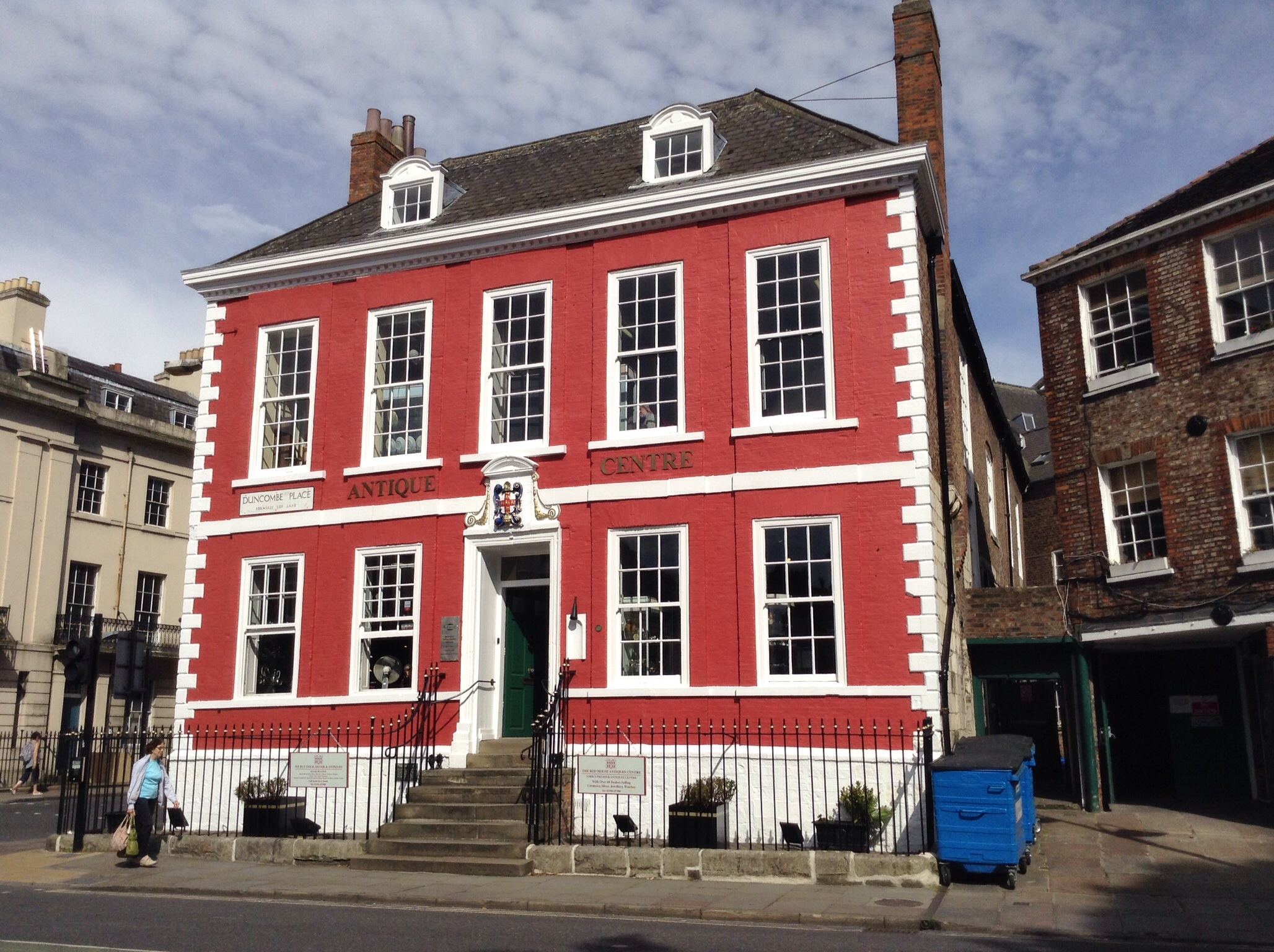
- The Red House, seen from Duncombe Place
- Interactive map of the The Red House area

General information
- Location: Duncombe Place, York, England
- Coordinates: 53°57′42″N 1°05′06″W
- Completed: c. 1714
- Renovated: Late 18th century (extended); 19th and 20th centuries (altered)

Technical details
- Floor count: 2 + cellar + attic

Design and construction
- Designations

Listed Building – Grade II*
- Official name: The Red House and railings attached at front
- Designated: 14 June 1954
- Reference no.: 1257875

The Red House is a historic building in the city centre of York, England.

The house lies on Duncombe Place, on the corner of St Leonard's Place. Its site is believed to be that of the east gate of St Leonard's Hospital. This was later replaced by a house which formed part of Mint Yard, which was purchased by the York Corporation in 1675. In 1701, that house was leased by Sir William Robinson, MP for York, and in about 1714 he rebuilt the house, retaining only the basement and ground floor walls at each side. William Etty designed another house for Robinson, and he is sometimes claimed to have also designed The Red House.

In 1725, the corporation asked Robinson to surrender his lease so that it could use the house, but he refused, and the corporation instead built York Mansion House. Robinson died in 1736, and passed the house to Richard Elcock. In 1740, it was leased to John Burton, and later passed through numerous hands. The house originally had an L-shaped plan, but in the late 18th century, an extension turned it into a near-rectangular plan. At the same time, a new cornice was added to the building.

The front of the house is of brick, painted red, with quoins and various dressings in stone, painted white. It is of five bays, with two main storeys, a basement and an attic. Eight stone steps lead up to the front door, and there are early 19th-century cast iron railings in front. Inside, it has some original fireplaces, panelling and cornices. The main staircase is late 18th-century, while the secondary staircase is early 18th-century.

In 1954, the house was Grade II* listed. In the late 20th century, it was used as the Leisure Services Department of the City of York Council. In 1999, the council sold it to the York Conservation Trust. The Trust lets it out for use as an antique centre, operated by Tim Hogarth.

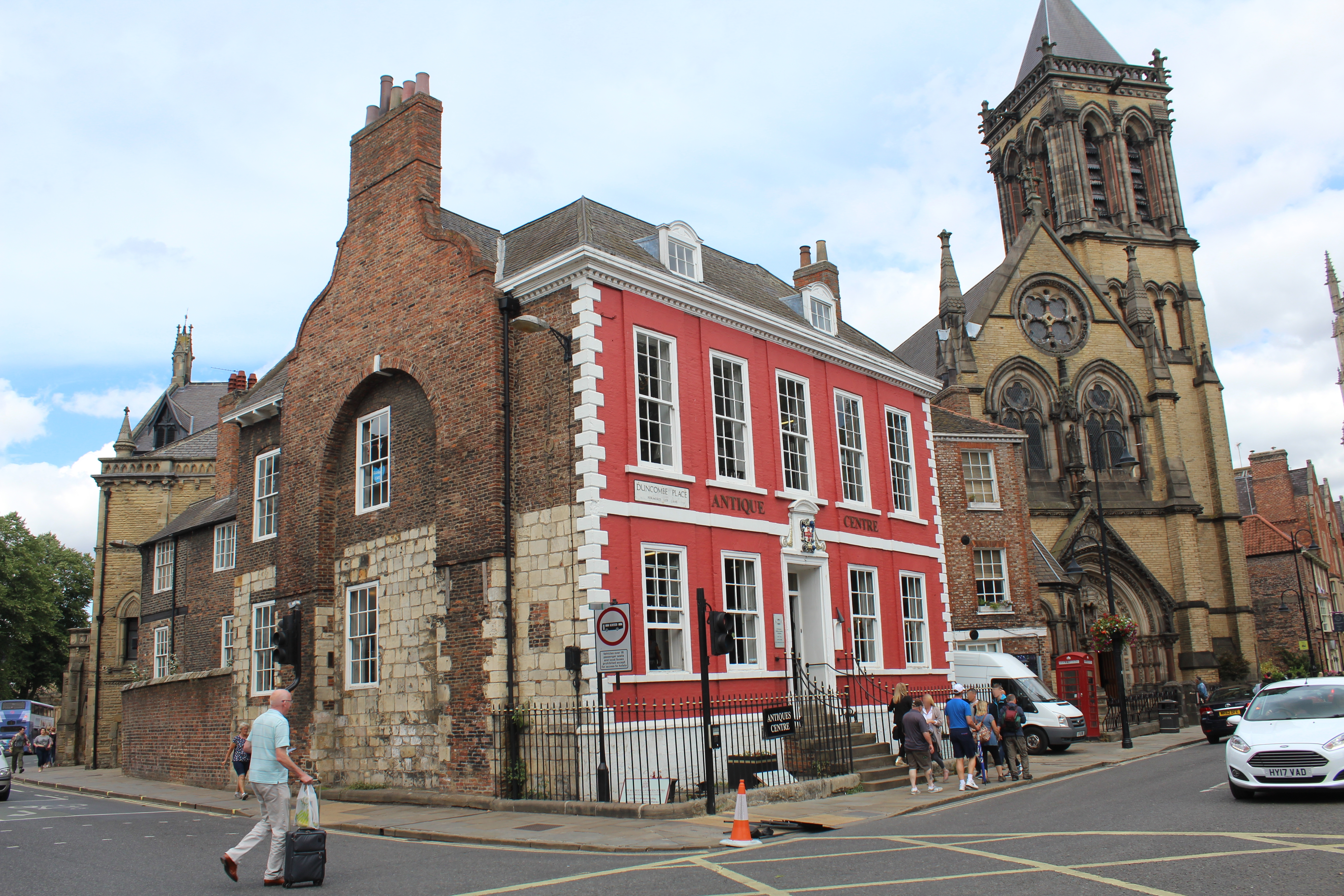
The Red House, seen from the junction of St Leonard's Place and Duncombe Place, with York Oratory to the right

== See also ==
- Grade II* listed buildings in the City of York
- Listed buildings in York (within the city walls, northern part)
