= Golden Fleece, York =

Listed pub in York, England

Golden Fleece
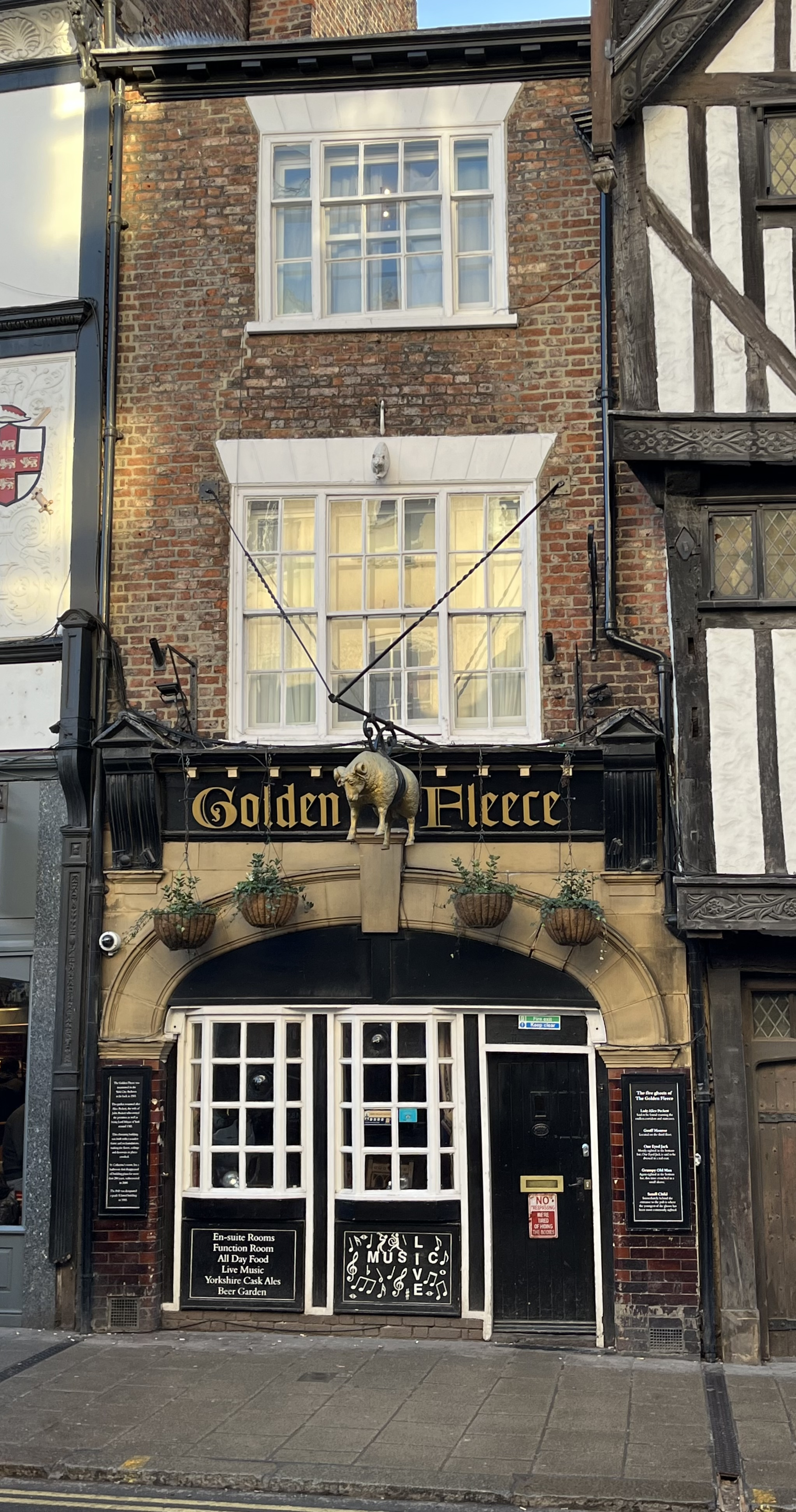
- The pub in 2023

General information
- Type: Public house; originally a coaching house
- Location: 16 Pavement, York, England
- Coordinates: 53.9587°N 1.0796°W
- Year built: c. 1840; 186 years ago (rebuilt)
- Renovated: 1926 (refurbished)

Website
- Official website

Listed Building – Grade II
- Official name: The Golden Fleece public house and attached outbuilding at rear
- Designated: 24 June 1983
- Reference no.: 1256915

The Golden Fleece is an inn on Pavement in York, England, with a free house pub on the ground floor and four guest bedrooms above. It dates back to at least the early 16th century, although the present building is a rebuild from around 1840. The pub claims to be the most haunted in the city.

== History ==
The Golden Fleece was originally built as a coaching house. The inn is mentioned in the York City Archives as far back as 1503, when it was owned by the Merchant Adventurers' Hall. The building derives it name from its dealings with local wool traders. From 1656, it began operating as an inn, however it was not officially licensed until 1668.

The back yard of the inn is named "Lady Peckett's Yard" after Alice Peckett, the wife of John Peckett who owned the premises as well as being Lord Mayor of York around 1702. It is also claimed that Alice Peckett's ghost haunts the building.

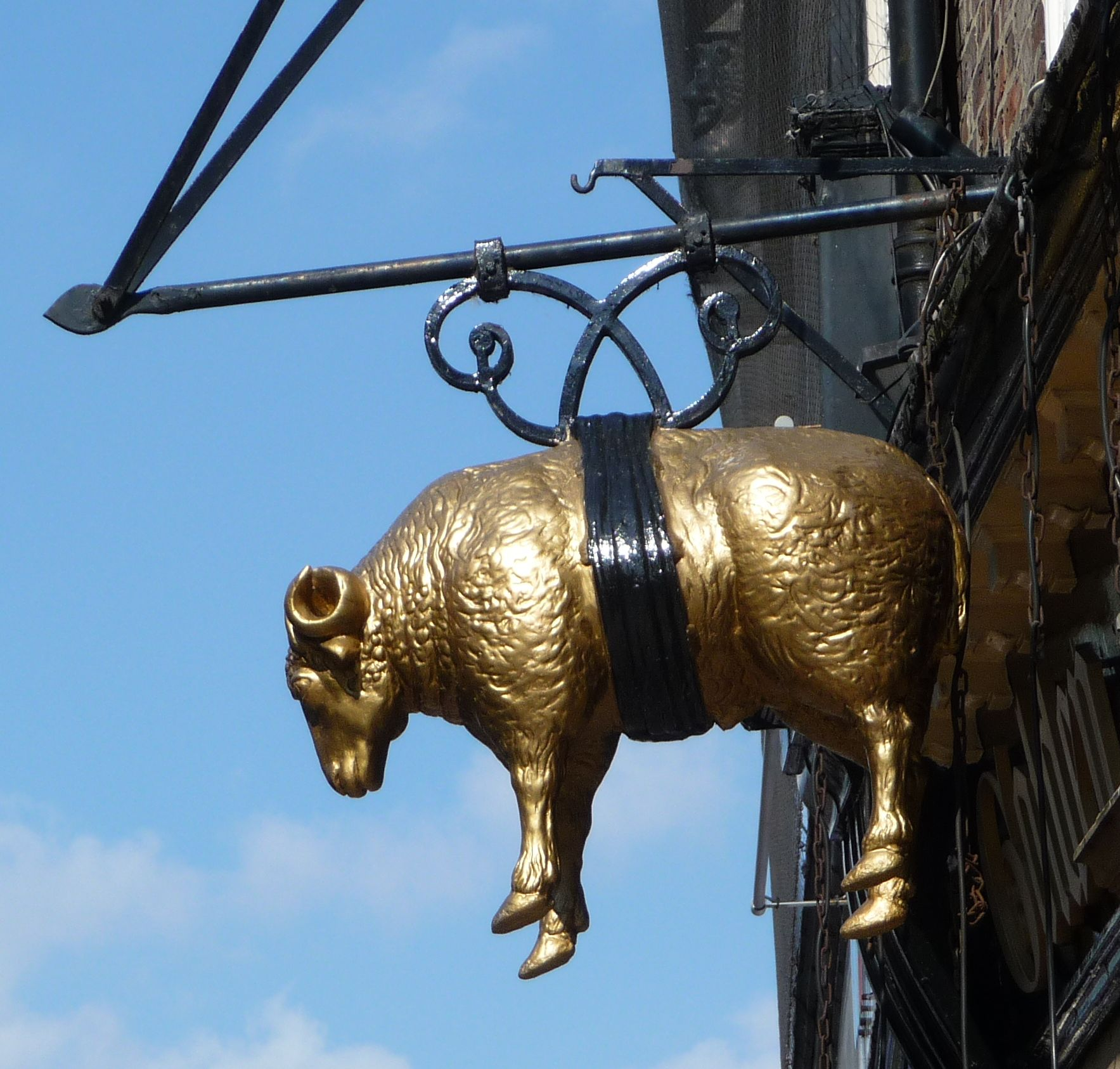
The Hanging Sheep sign above the entrance

In 1800, Elizabeth Johnson was convicted of forging a £1 bank note and was sentenced to death. She was hanged on 23 August 1800 and became the last woman to be executed at York's Tyburn. A replica of her skull is displayed at the Golden Fleece. On 1 January 2022, the skull was stolen from the pub, but was later returned that same month.

The inn was rebuilt around 1840. In 1983, it was designated a Grade II listed building by English Heritage. It stands between the early-17th-century Sir Thomas Herbert's House at Nos. 12–14, and Nos. 18–22, built in 1893 and formerly the Pavement Vaults pub.

The inn claims to be the most haunted public house in the city. It was featured in Most Haunted, a television series about supposedly paranormal phenomena.

== Architecture ==
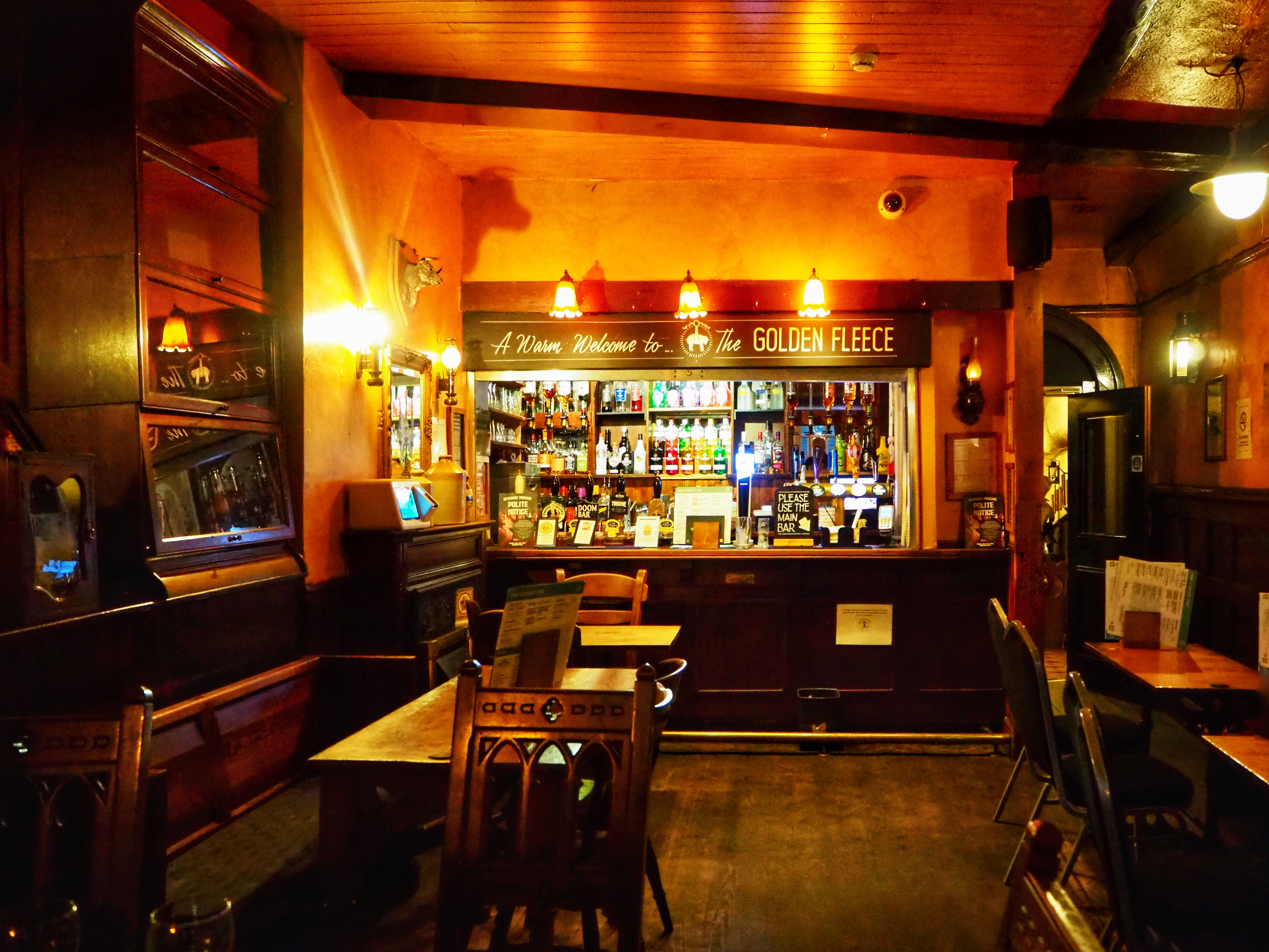
The pub interior

The pub is situated on the Pavement in the centre of York. It is next to the Herbert House, a Grade I listed building which has a first floor jetty incorporated into a side passage of the Golden Fleece.

The Golden Fleece was built with pink-grey Flemish-bonded bricks, while the wing and outbuilding used orange-red English garden-wall bonded bricks. The front features glazed tiles and ashlar, with a timber cornice. The roof is tiled at the front and pantiled at the back. The first and second floors have tripartite windows, in addition to both having painted channelled wedge lintels and painted sills.

== See also ==
- Listed buildings in York (within the city walls, southern part)
