= Peckett (surname) =

Peckett is a surname. Notable people with this name include:

- John Peckett (born 17th century), Lord Mayor of York 1701–1702
- Justin Peckett (born 1972), Australian rules footballer
- Thomas Peckett (1834–1891), founder of Peckett and Sons, Bristol, England
- Thomas Peckett Prest (circa 1810–1859), British hack writer, journalist etc.
