= 67 Micklegate =

Listed building in York, England

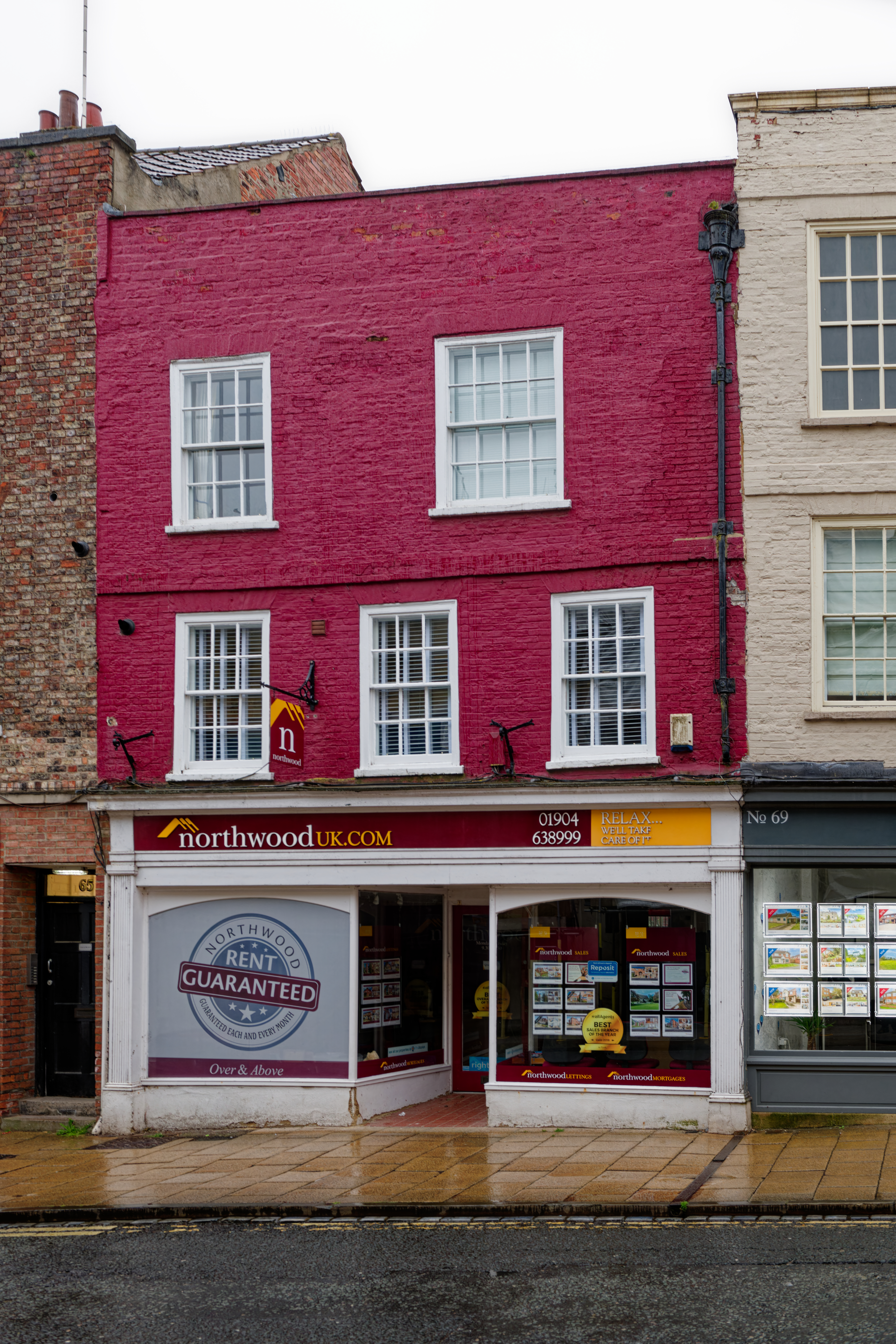
- The building in 2024
- Interactive map of the 67 Micklegate area

General information
- Status: Converted to commercial use
- Type: House (former)
- Location: Micklegate, York, England
- Coordinates: 53.9571°N 1.0883°W
- Year built: Mid-16th century
- Renovated: Early 18th century (refronted and altered); Early 19th century (parapet and extended); 20th century (shopfront)

Listed Building – Grade II*
- Official name: 67, Micklegate
- Designated: 14 June 1954
- Reference no.: 1257308

67 Micklegate is a Grade II* listed building on Micklegate in the city of York, England. Built in the mid‑16th century, it was altered in the early 18th and early 19th centuries, and adapted for shop use in the 20th century. The property appears to have been a butcher's shop for many years, with several occupants in the late 18th and early 19th centuries working in that trade. It was included in the Central Historic Core conservation area in 1968. The building stands between Grade II‑listed Nos. 63–65, and Nos. 69–71, which are also listed at Grade II*. It is now occupied by the estate agency Northwood York.

== History ==
Built in the mid‑16th century on Micklegate, the house was given a new front and altered in the early 18th century, then updated again in the early 19th century with a parapet and an extension. The ground floor was later adapted for shop use in the 20th century. The building was probably used as a butcher's shop for many years, as its successive occupants William Hill (from before 1798), Chamberlain of York in 1807, and Peter Armistead, Chamberlain in 1823, all worked in that trade.

On 14 June 1954, No. 67 Micklegate was designated a Grade II* listed building, and in 1968 the site was included within the newly established Central Historic Core conservation area. It stands between Grade II-listed Nos. 63–65, and Nos. 69–71, which are also listed at Grade II*. No. 67 is now occupied by the estate agency Northwood York.

== Architecture ==
Originally timber‑framed, the building now has a painted brick front with a parapet of stone coping above a pantile roof and brick chimneys. It began as an L‑shaped structure, with a front range of two uneven bays and a short rear wing to the right; the wing was later extended and the gap between it and the front range was filled in.

The front has three storeys and three windows. The ground floor has a shopfront with reeded pilasters and a cornice, and a glazed door set back between angled plate‑glass windows. On the first floor are 12‑pane sash windows; the second floor has two windows, a 16‑pane sash on the right and a 12‑pane sash on the left. The 12‑pane sashes have exposed frames and thick glazing bars. All windows sit under flat arches and have painted stone sills, and a raised brick band runs across the second floor. At the right end of the parapet is an inverted bell‑shaped rainwater head dated 1763, with its downpipe fixed on rosette‑shaped clamps. At the rear, the wing has two storeys and an attic.

=== Interior ===
Inside, part of the early‑18th‑century front staircase survives, with its original balusters and handrail. A small round‑headed window from the back staircase remains in the rear extension. The first‑floor front room shows its main beams and original joists, and a section of the studded rear wall is visible on the landing. Two rooms in the rear extension contain duck‑nest fire grates, one set in a painted stone surround.

The lower part of the back staircase to the attic has gone, though its carved dado rail survives; the upper part is partly enclosed. On the second floor, a studded partition divides the front range and likely keeps its early infill, with a board door beside the front wall. The larger room has jowled corner posts and a blocked two‑light window, and both rooms have exposed spine beams. The smaller room also shows its ceiling joists.

A fireplace with a cambered brick arch stands behind a later chimneypiece and contains a late‑18th‑century oven and grate. Half of a roof truss is visible in the rear wall of the front staircase, with the other half in the attic of the rear wing. The upper part of the back staircase in the extension survives, and the rear wing and extension have collar‑truss roofs.

== See also ==
- Grade II* listed buildings in the City of York
- Listed buildings in York (within the city walls, southern part)
