= St Leonard's Place hoard =

English hoard of early medieval coins

- Type: Hoard
- Size: c. 10,000
- Created: c. 865 (deposited)
- Period/culture: Early medieval
- Discovered: 23 April 1842; St Leonard's Place, York, England

The St Leonard's Place hoard was a hoard of c. 10,000 early medieval Northumbrian coins known as stycas, discovered by workers during construction work at St Leonard's Place in York in 1842. Many of the coins were subsequently acquired by the Yorkshire Museum.

== Discovery ==
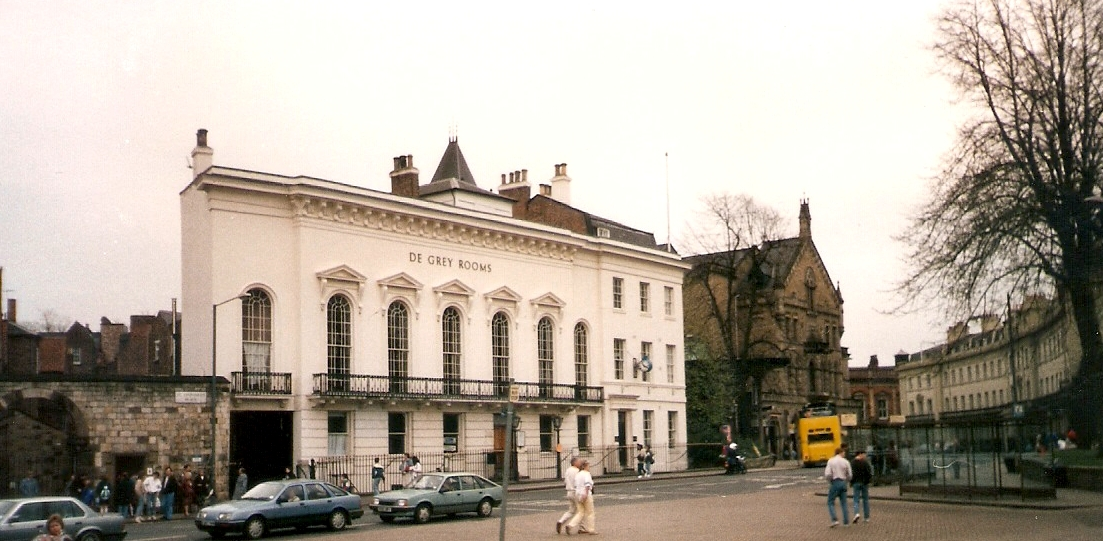
De Grey Rooms, York (1987)

The St Leonard's Place hoard was discovered on 23 April 1842 by workmen digging a drain during the construction of the De Grey Rooms on the street St Leonard's Place in York, England. One of the workmen said that the hoard had been contained in a clay vessel, which was broken when a pickaxe struck it.

== Contents ==
It is estimated that the hoard contained c. 10,000 stycas, a type of early medieval Northumbrian coin. It contained both silver-alloy and copper-alloy stycas, and a listing from the Journal of the British Archaeological Association in 1846 includes coins of the kings Eanred, Aethelred II, Redwulf and Osberht, as well as those of the archbishops Eanbald, Wigmund and Wulfhere. The composition of the hoard has led to the suggestion that it was deposited in York c. 865.

== Acquisition ==
The contents were dispersed by the workmen and many stycas were sold on by a local silversmith at six pence each. In 1844, Daniel Haigh examined 866 coins from the hoard, and in 1868 Jonathan Rashleigh examined c. 3000 specimens.

Despite the loss of many of the coins from the hoard, according to Charles Wellbeloved, writing in 1881, c. 4000 coins from the hoard had been acquired by the Yorkshire Museum. Despite the work of numismatist Elizabeth Pirie in identifying coins from the hoard, not all of them can be differentiated from the museum's wider collection today. Pirie was able to identify 1,234 coins in the collection that are highly likely to have originated from the hoard, although the amount potentially recognisable could be as high as 1,860. Coins represented include those of Eanred, Archbishop Eanbald II, Aethelred II, Archbishop Wigmund, Redwulf, Osberht and Archbishop Wulfhere.
