= King's Manor =

Grade I listed manor house in York, England

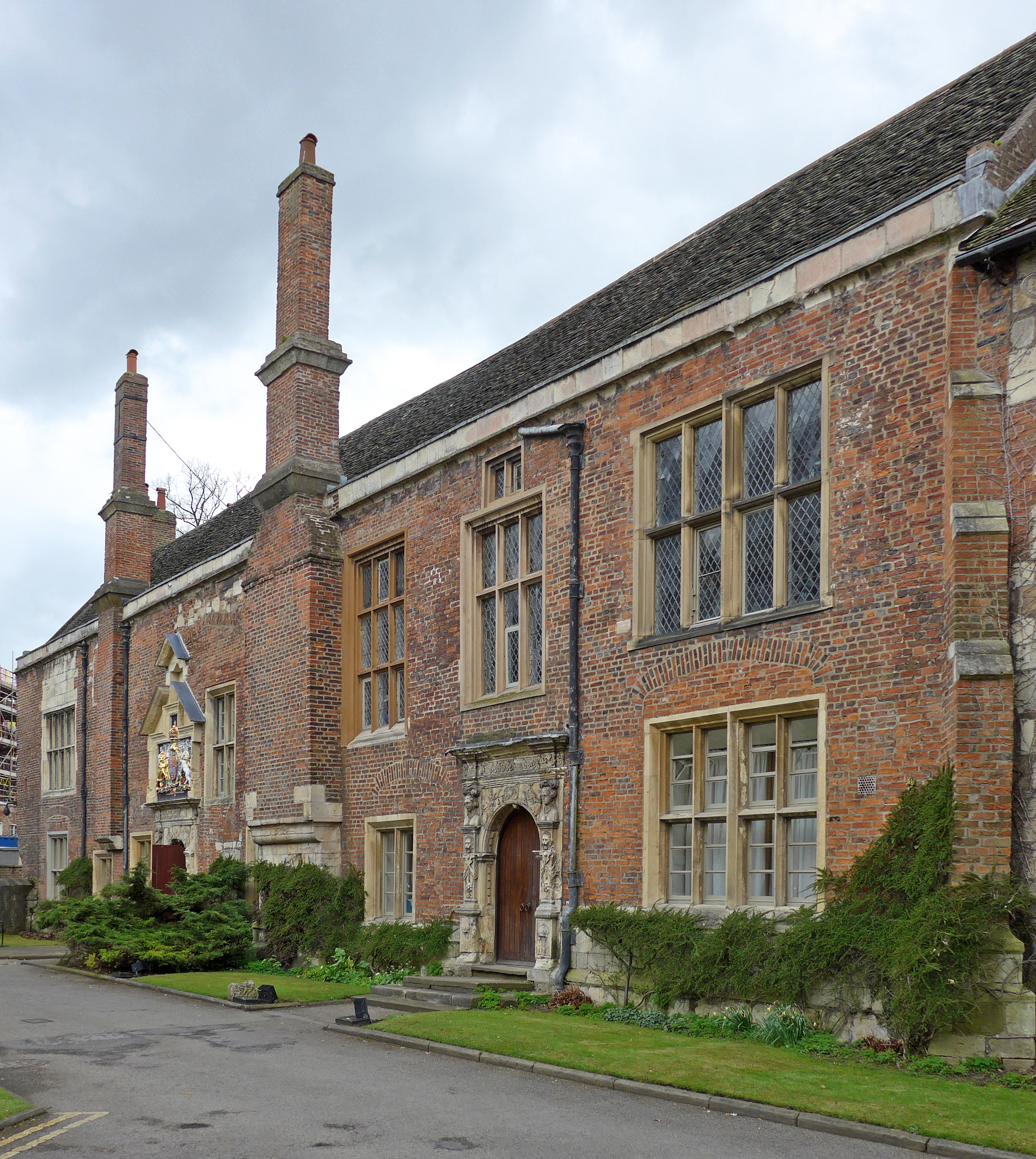
- Front facade of King's Manor
- Interactive map of the King's Manor area

General information
- Location: Exhibition Square, York, England
- Coordinates: 53.9624°N 1.0865°W
- Year built: 1483–1502 (rebuilt)
- Renovated: 1561–1563 and c. 1590 (added); 1610–1620 (extended); 1682 (repaired); 18th century (refenestrated and re‑roofed) c. 1870 (remodelled) c. 1900 (altered); 1963–64 (restored and modernised)

Renovating team
- Architects: J. B. and W. Atkinson (c. 1870); W. H. Brierley (c. 1900); Fielden and Mawson (1963–64)

Listed Building – Grade I
- Official name: The Kings Manor
- Designated: 14 June 1954
- Reference no.: 1257855

Location within York

The King's Manor is a Grade I listed building on Exhibition Square in the city of York, England. As of July 2026, it is part of York St John University.

== History ==
King's Manor was originally built to house the abbots of St Mary's Abbey, York. When the abbey was dissolved in 1539, Henry VIII instructed that it be the seat of the Council of the North. It performed this role until the council was abolished in 1641.

Thomas Cecil, Lord Burghley, was President of the Council of the North in 1603 when Elizabeth I died. He wrote to Sir Robert Cecil that he had moved out of the house, so that the new king, James VI and I, could stay there on his journey south to London. The house was empty of furnishings and "quite out of order". King James made plans for a large public reception at York. Lord Burghley stocked the wine cellars and larders. King James came to the "Manor of St Mary's" on 16 April 1603 and stayed in York for three days. The buildings were upgraded and embellished by Thomas Wentworth, President of the North from 1628 to 1631, with new doorways and coats of arms.

From 1667 to 1688, the manor was the residence of the Governor of York. During the Glorious Revolution of 1688, the Governor, Sir John Reresby, 2nd Baronet, remained loyal to the King, James II, but a party of armed men, led by Thomas Osborne, Earl of Danby, captured the Manor and the City of York, and held them for William of Orange. After 1688, the building was hired out to private tenants until the nineteenth century, when it was taken over and expanded by the Yorkshire School for the Blind.

For a detailed description of the history and architecture of the building, perhaps the best source is that contained in the RCHME Inventory of the City of York, Volume IV.

=== Occupancy ===
On the departure of the Blind School in 1958, the manor was acquired by York City Council, who leased it to the University of York in 1963. The main university later moved to the Heslington Campus. From 1966, the principal academic department to use the manor was the Institute of Advanced Architectural Studies (IoAAS). The building also housed six university staff flats. The Dining Room provided an important place for the meeting of 'town and gown', especially in the early years of the university. Following the closure of the IoAAS in 1997, the main occupant became the Department of Archaeology (including the Archaeology Data Service), plus the Centre for Medieval Studies and the Centre for Eighteenth Century Studies. In April 2022 there were reports of criminal damage to the manor. It was reported that several windows had been broken and that blood was found at the scene, presumed to have been caused by broken glass.

In 2024, the University of York said that it would move out of King's Manor by the summer of 2026, citing accessibility concerns and high running and maintenance costs due to the age of the building. York St John University took over the long-term leasehold of the site from 20th July 2026. YSJ said the move would involve creating new teaching and lecture spaces, a new base for their public-facing Law Clinic and Business Clinic, business incubation space, new events facilities, and office accommodation for up to 100 staff.

== See also ==
- Grade I listed buildings in the City of York
- History of York
- Listed buildings in York (outside the city walls, northern part)
