= De Grey Rooms =

Listed building in York, England

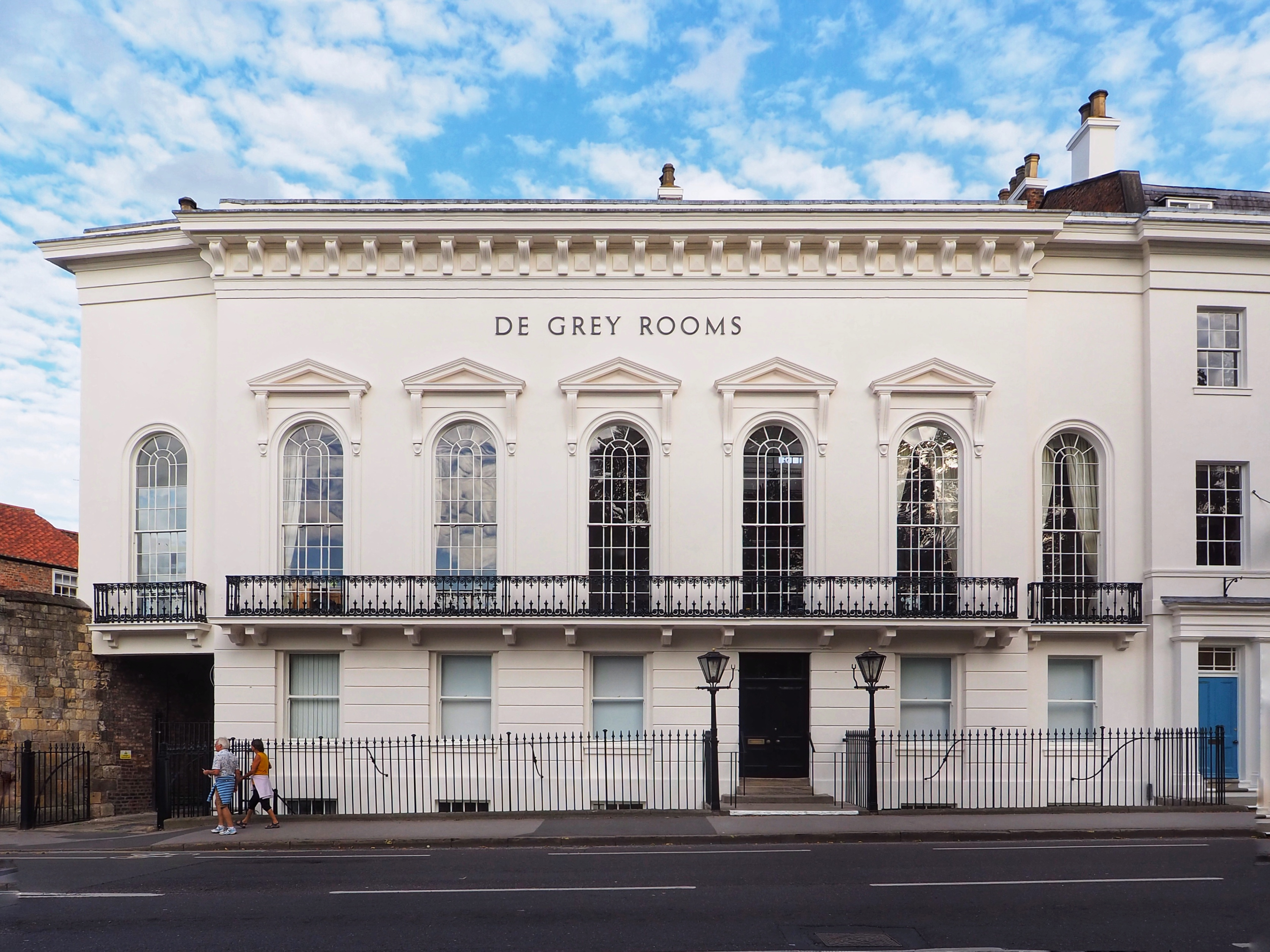
- The building in 2023

- Location within York City Centre

General information
- Location: St Leonard's Place, York, England
- Coordinates: 53°57′45″N 1°05′07″W
- Completed: 1841–42
- Client: Earl de Grey; Yorkshire Hussars

Technical details
- Floor count: 2 / 3 + cellar

Design and construction
- Architect: George Townsend Andrews
- Designations

Listed Building – Grade II*
- Official name: De Grey Rooms and attached gates, railings and lamp standards
- Designated: 14 June 1954
- Reference no.: 1256766

The De Grey Rooms is a historic building in the city of York, England. It was built in 1841–1842 and is a Grade II* listed building.

== The building ==
=== Construction ===
The De Grey Rooms were built by public subscription at the instigation of Thomas de Grey, 2nd Earl de Grey, Commanding Officer of the Yorkshire Hussars, to provide a place for the Regiment's Annual Mess and to supplement accommodation at the Assembly Rooms.

The building stands on the western edge of St Leonard's Place. It joins onto the western face of De Grey House, built in 1835, and faces the York Art Gallery. During its construction, on 23 April 1842 workmen digging a drain discovered a hoard of Anglo-Saxon coins, later named the St Leonard's Place hoard. One of the workmen said that the hoard had been contained in a clay vessel, which was broken when a pickaxe struck it.

=== Design ===
The building was designed by the architect George Townsend Andrews. It was intended to be used as a ballroom, concert hall, and for meetings.

It is two storeys in height, with a basement below, built in brick and with a cement-rendered front elevation in a neo-classical style. There are seven large windows on the front, with a carriageway beneath the left one. A narrow balcony on the first floor is bordered by iron railings, and there are larger railing at ground level.

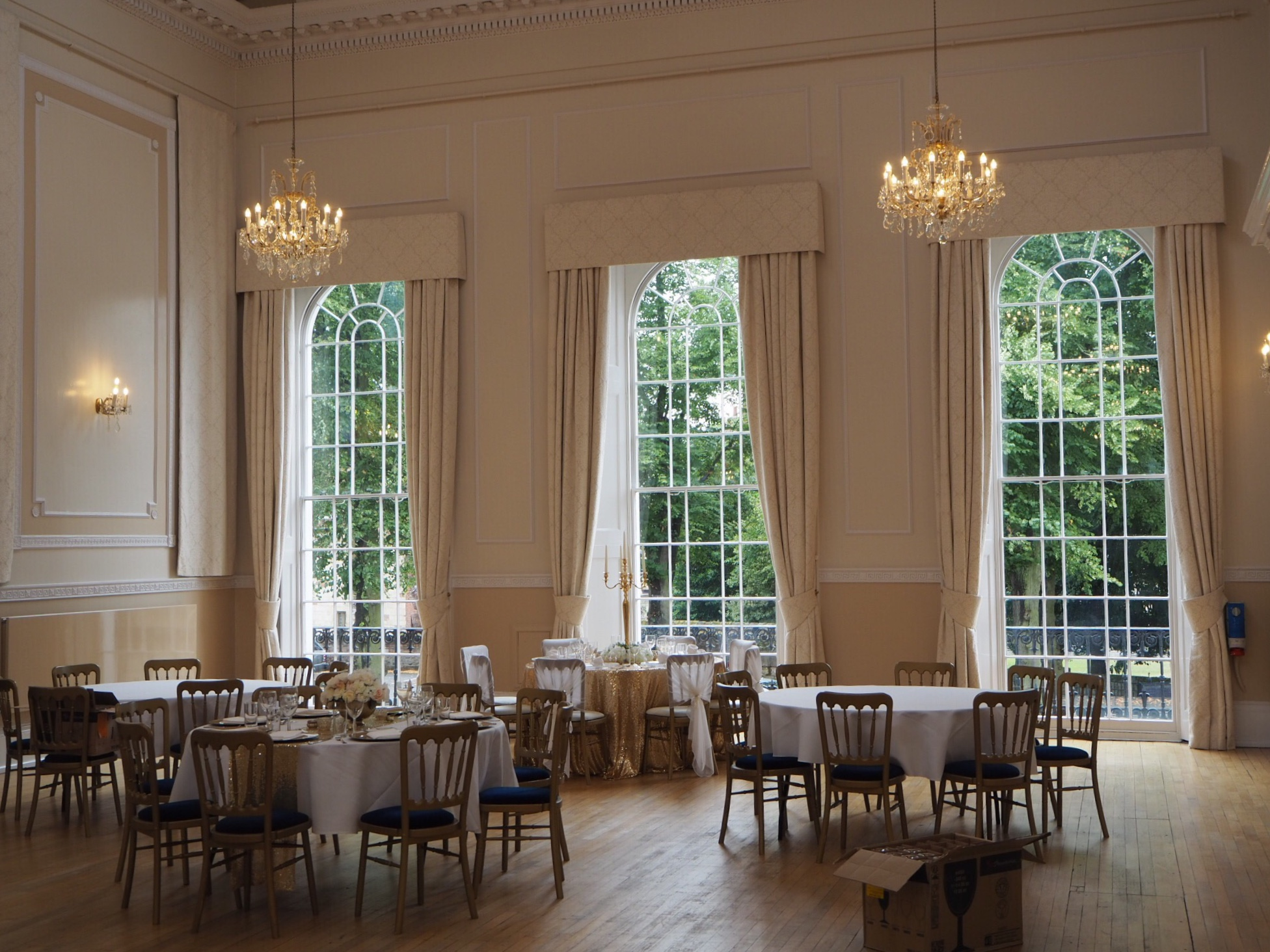

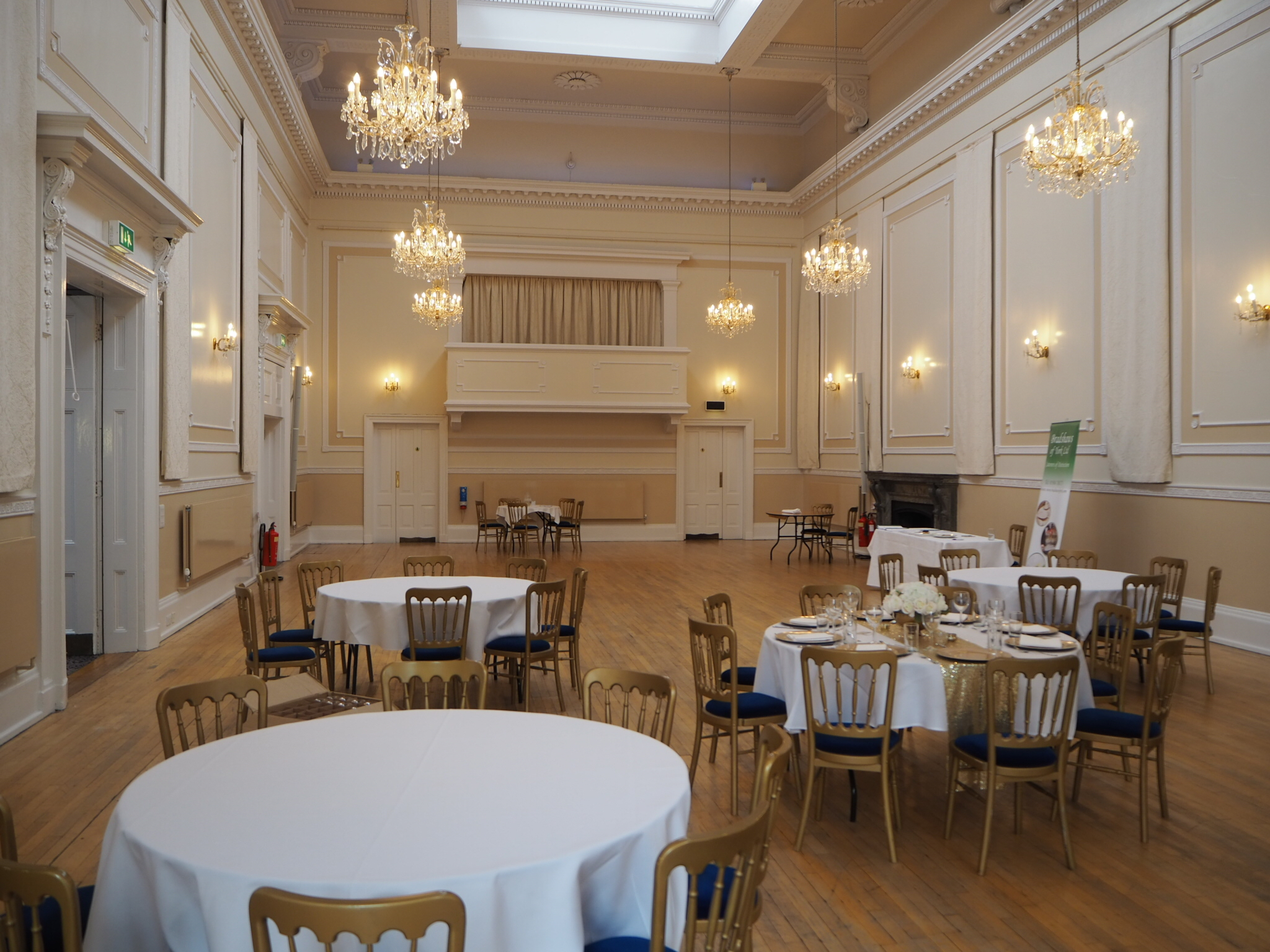

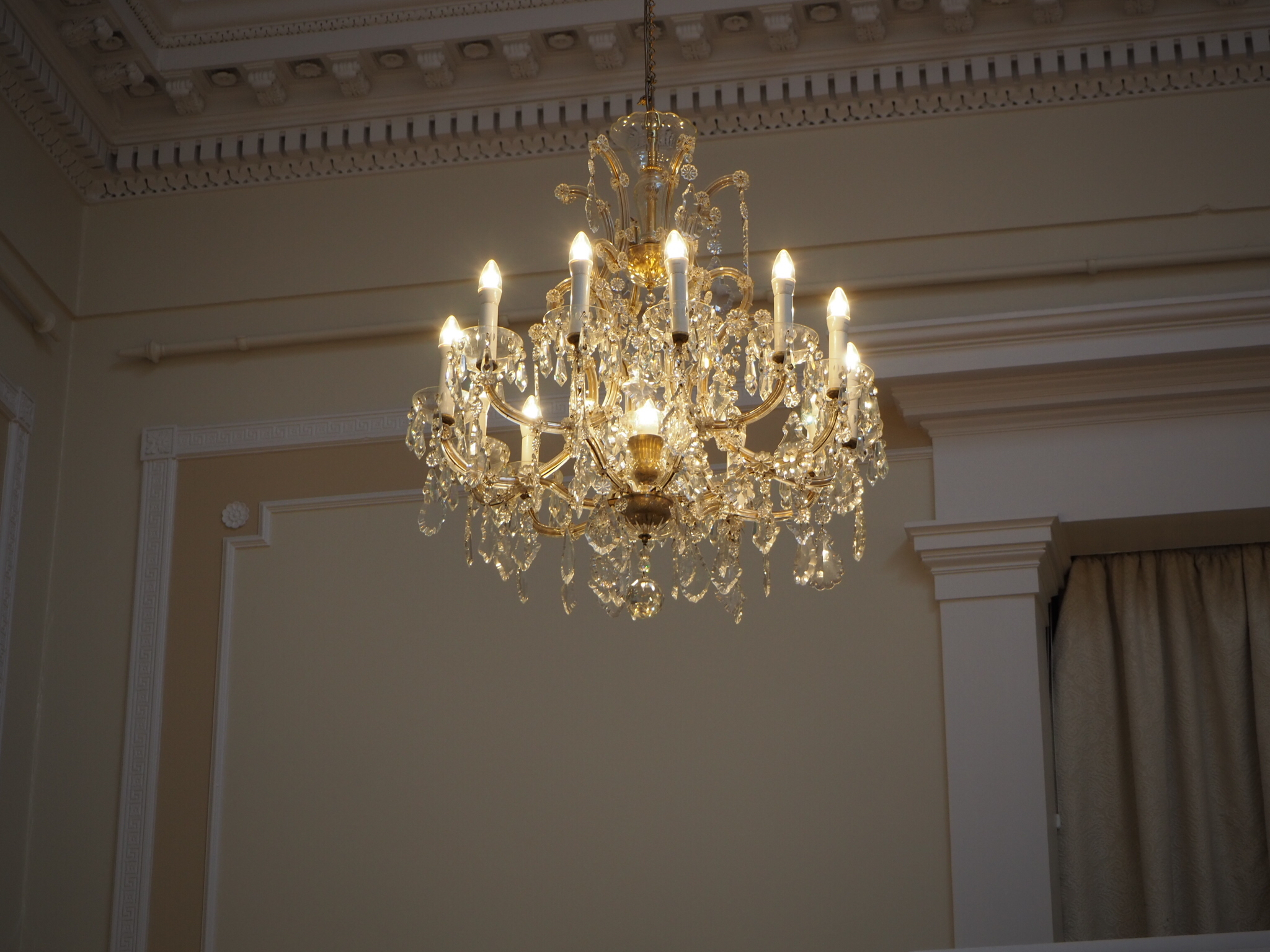

== History and use ==
The building was used for military social events initially. During the Second World War and afterwards the ballroom was used for public dances.

In the early 2000s, the ground floor was used as a tourist information centre for York. On 31 March 2005, the De Grey Rooms were purchased from the City of York Council by the York Conservation Trust in order to "preserve the buildings for posterity as significant repairs and renovations were required to be carried out". The Trust leased it to York Theatre Royal, who used some of it for storage of costumes and sets. The building closed in March 2020 during the COVID-19 pandemic. The site was again used by the theatre to host rehearsals in 2022. The cast of The Bone Sparrow rehearsed in a bubble before the premier in February 2022.

== See also ==
- Grade II* listed buildings in the City of York
- Listed buildings in York (within the city walls, northern part)
