= De Grey House =

Building in York, North Yorkshire, England

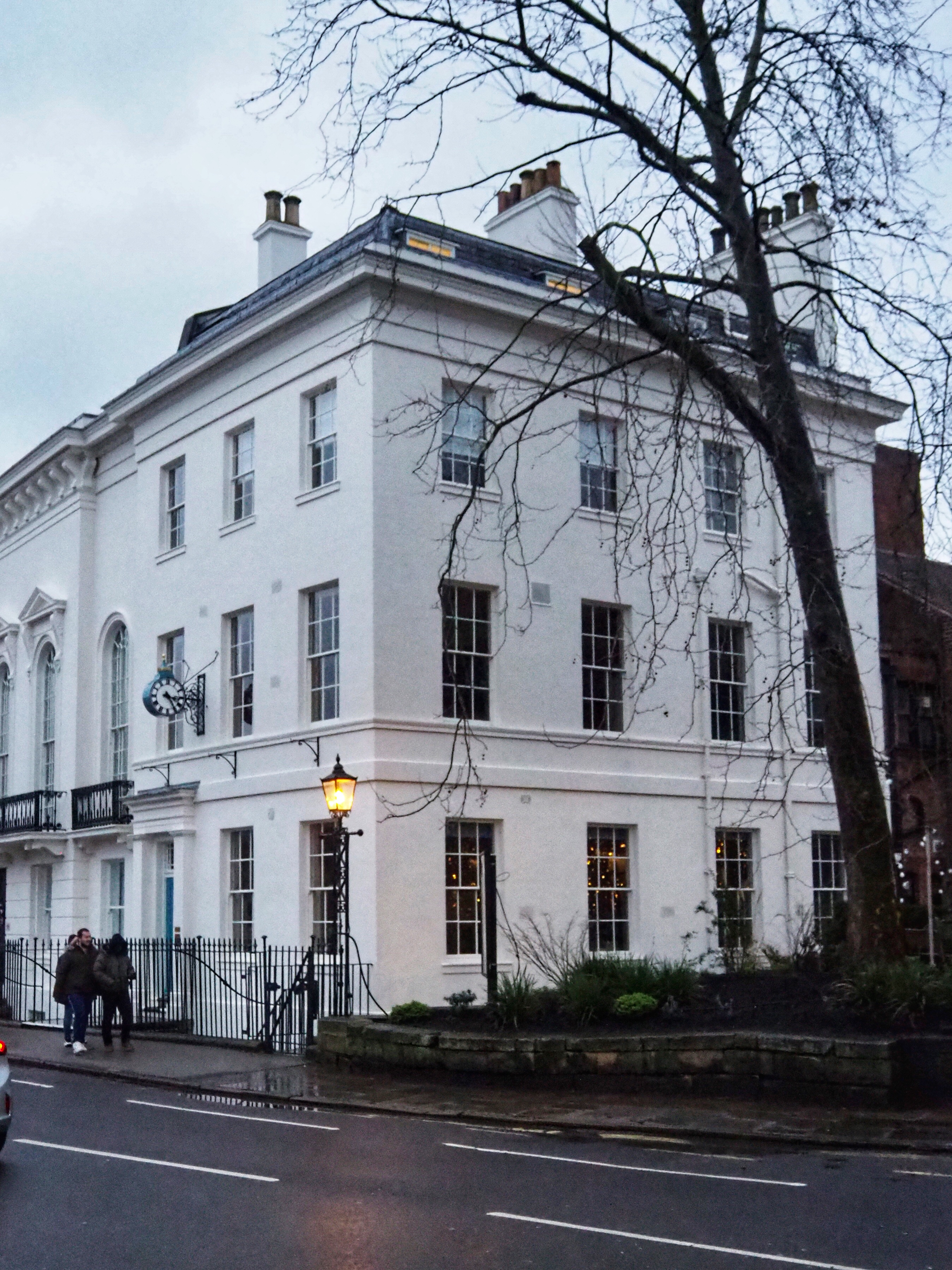
- The building in 2023

- Location within York City Centre

General information
- Location: St Leonard's Place, York, England
- Coordinates: 53.9623°N 1.0853°W
- Year built: 1835
- Renovated: 1910 (extended)
- Client: William Blanchard

Design and construction
- Architects: Peter Frederick Robinson and George Townsend Andrews

Website
- Official website

Listed Building – Grade II*
- Official name: De Grey House and attached front railings, gate and lamp standard
- Designated: 1 July 1968
- Reference no.: 1256764

De Grey House is a historic building in the city centre of York, England.

The building was constructed in 1835, for William Blanchard, on the eastern side of the newly constructed St Leonard's Place. It was designed by Peter Frederick Robinson and George Townsend Andrews. It was originally intended to be one of a terrace of three houses, but the adjoining plots were instead used to construct the De Grey Rooms. The style of the building was new to the city, and its set-back mansard roof was also an innovation. In 1909, the building was converted to become the York Central Conservative Club, and the following year a single-bay rear wing was demolished and replaced by a new extension. When the club closed it became offices for the City of York Council, then in 2005 was purchased by York Conservation Trust for use as its headquarters.

The house was Grade II* listed in 1968, along with its attached railings, gate and lamp standard. It is constructed of brick, covered in Roman cement painted white, with a slate roof. The rear extension is in orange-red brick. It has three storeys with a basement and attic, and the front is three bays wide. The right side is four bays wide, with an eight-bay two-storey extension. It has sash windows throughout, and the front door, with an overlight, is accessed across a short bridge. There are external steps down to the basement, and at the front are cast-iron railings and a gas lamp standard with a crossbar and a four-sided lantern. Inside, many original features survive, including the main staircase, plasterwork, and various marble chimneypieces with pilasters. The richest decoration is in the dining room at the front of the first floor.

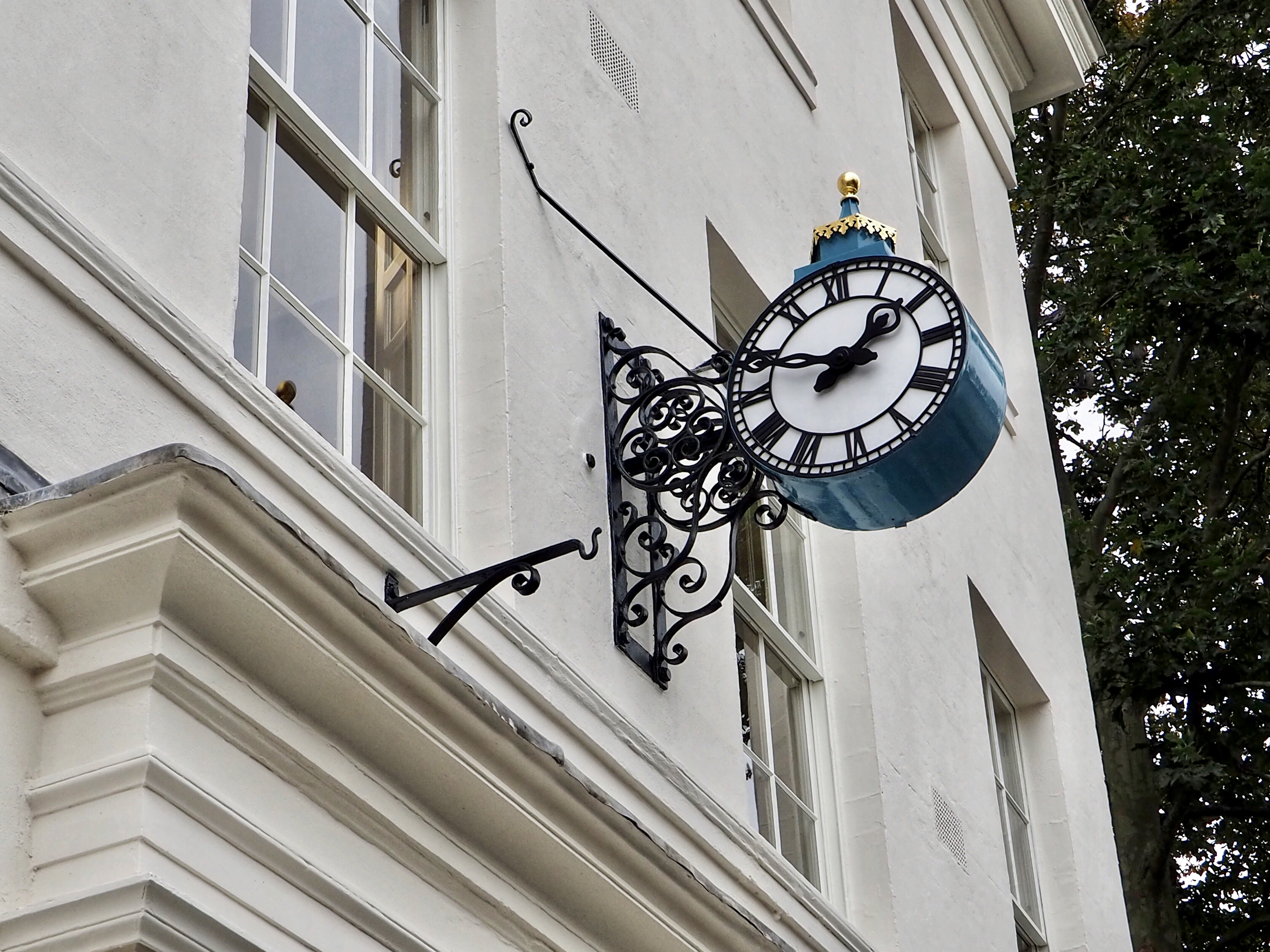
The Newey Clock

A clock was commissioned from George Newey in 1906, for display at the conference of the British Association for the Advancement of Science, held where York Art Gallery now stands. After the conference closed, Newey put the clock on display at his premises in Petergate. In the 1950s, it was installed at De Grey House. The clock faces are either side of a drum, topped by a model of a blue tent, all supported by a pair of scrolled iron brackets. The weight-driven mechanism is inside the house and is wound weekly by the York Clock Group.

== See also ==
- Grade II* listed buildings in the City of York
- Listed buildings in York (within the city walls, northern part)
