= 1–9 St Leonard's Place =

Listed building in York, England

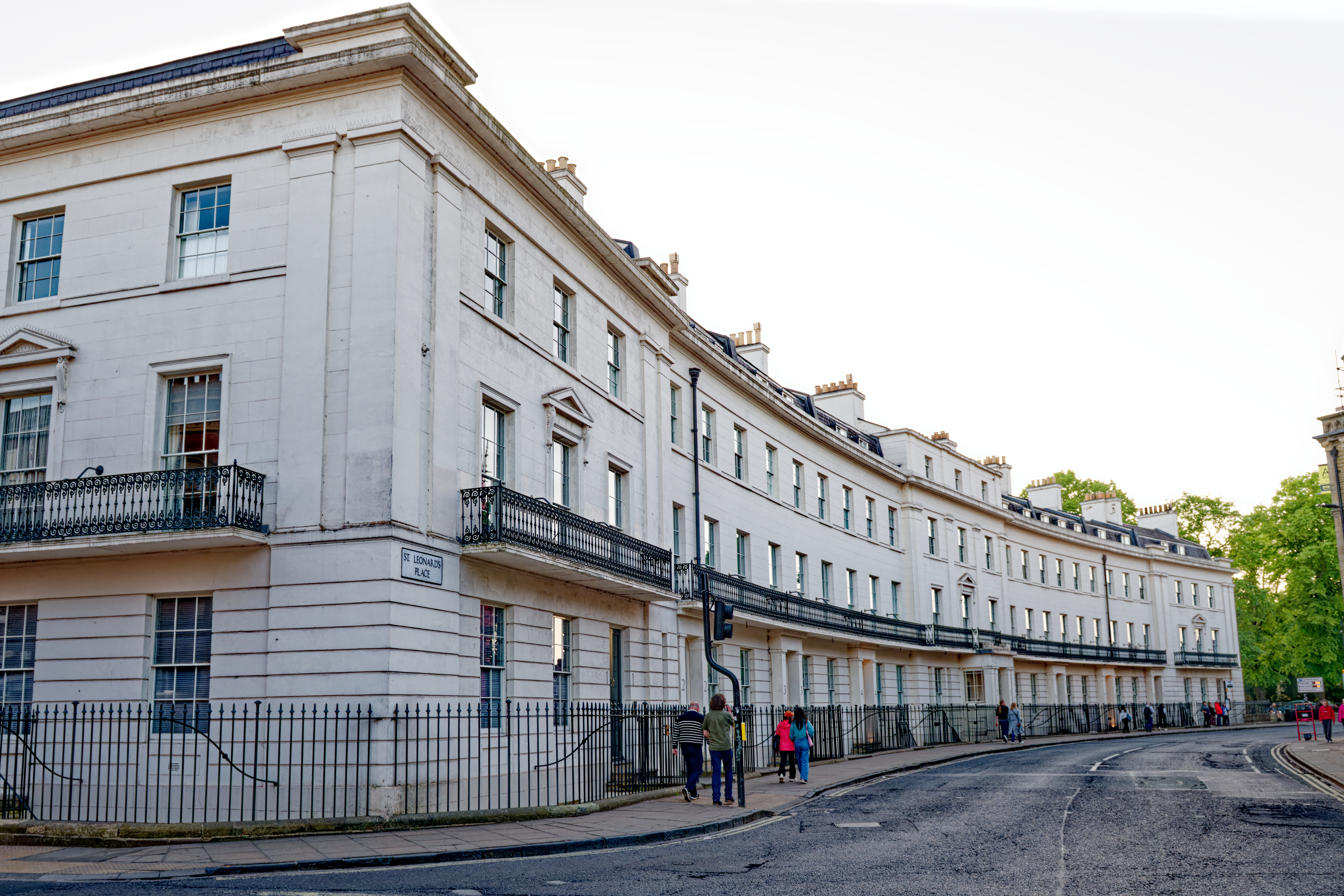
- The terrace in 2024
- Interactive map of the 1–9 St Leonard's Place area

General information
- Status: Converted from council offices to residential use
- Type: Terrace of houses (former)
- Location: St Leonard's Place, York, England
- Coordinates: 53°57′42″N 1°05′09″W
- Year built: 1834; 192 years ago
- Renovated: 2015–2017

Design and construction
- Architect: John Harper
- Other designers: G. T. Andrews and P. Robinson Jnr. (No. 1 interior)
- Designations

Listed Building – Grade II*
- Official name: Numbers 1–9 (consecutive) and railings attached to front wall
- Designated: 14 June 1954
- Reference no.: 1256761

1–9 St Leonard's Place is a Grade II* listed terrace on St Leonard's Place in the city of York, England. Built in 1834 as a row of nine houses designed by John Harper, with interiors by several architects including G. T. Andrews at No. 1, the terrace was partly adapted for institutional use in the 19th century. It later served as council offices from 1933 until 2013. The buildings were restored for residential use from 2015, creating a mix of five townhouses and 29 apartments.

== History ==
Built in 1834 as a terrace of nine houses, the buildings have since been altered and extended. The terrace was designed by John Harper, with interiors by various architects, including G. T. Andrews and P. Robinson Jnr. at No. 1. Although designed as houses, some of the larger plots proved difficult to develop for domestic use in the 19th century: No. 1 became the home of the York Subscription Library, while the large central plot at No. 5 was occupied by the Yorkshire Club. In 1933, the expiry of several 99‑year leases allowed the Corporation of York to convert the main terrace into council offices; it vacated the buildings in 2013.

On 14 June 1954, Nos. 1–9 were designated a Grade II* listed building. and in 1968 the site was included within the newly established Central Historic Core conservation area.

Rushbond, which bought the crescent from the city council, began restoring it to residential use in April 2015 after abandoning earlier plans for an 88‑bedroom hotel when the operator withdrew. The five‑storey terrace was converted into 40 homes: five reinstated townhouses at Nos. 2–4 and 6–7, twenty‑nine apartments within the remaining original houses, and six mews properties on St Leonard's Mews behind St Leonard's Place.

== Architecture ==
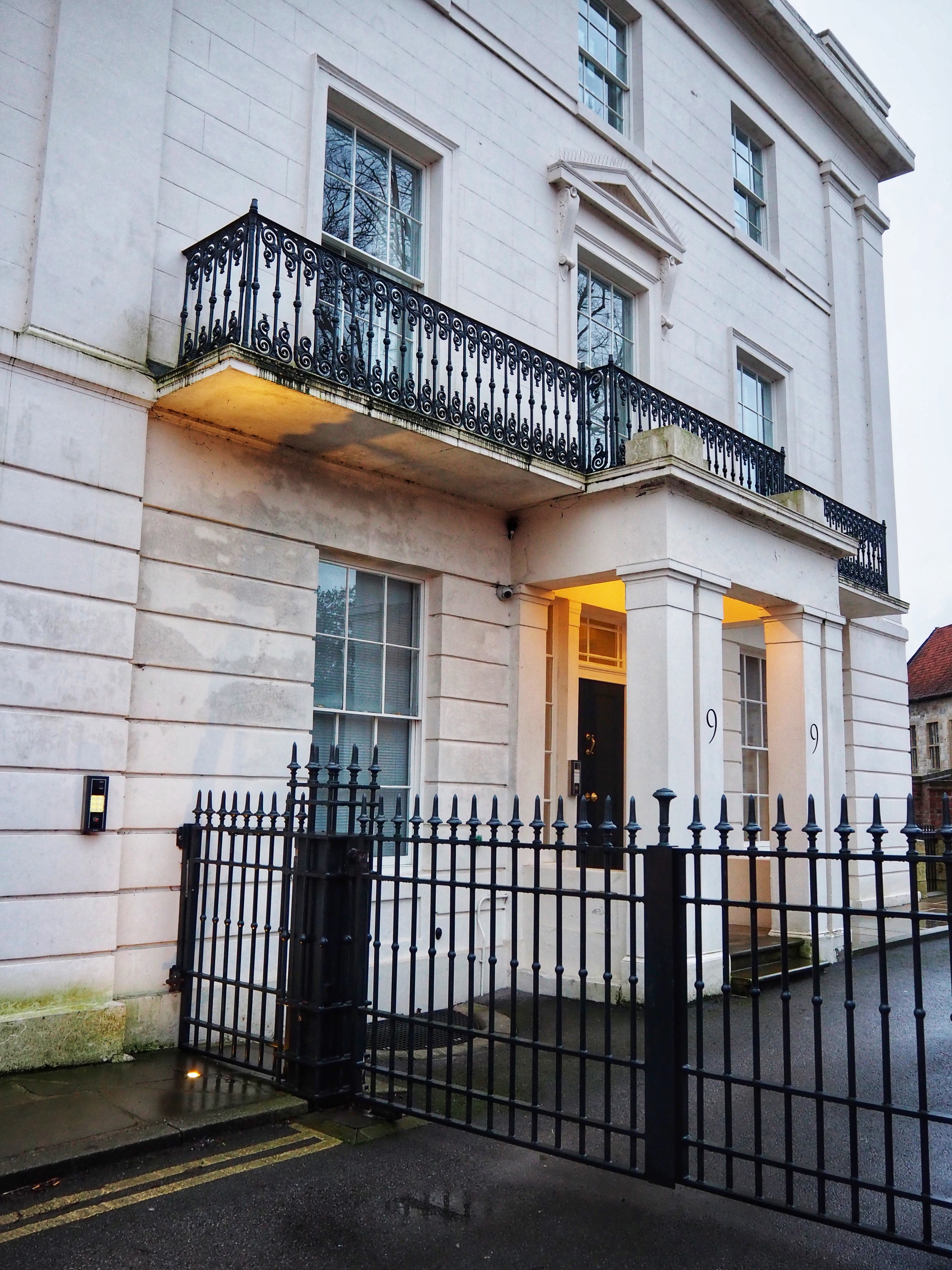
Detail of No. 9

The front and side walls are finished in stucco, with heavier detailing at ground level, while the rear is built of orange‑brown brick. The roof is a slate‑covered mansard with stuccoed chimneys. Cast‑iron railings, balconies and stair balustrades are used throughout.

The building has three storeys, with basements and attics, and a long curving front of 27 bays; each house occupies three. Nos. 1, 5 and 9 project slightly and are marked by tall pilasters rising from the first floor, with paired pilasters framing the corners of Nos. 1 and 9. The original entrances to Nos. 1 and 9 were in their side walls. The basement areas have six‑panel doors and 12‑pane windows, reached by flat bridges leading to the main entrances. Nos. 5 and 9 have projecting porches with paired pilasters and an entablature; No. 1 once had a similar porch, now removed. The remaining houses have pilastered door surrounds. Most doors have four flush panels with bordered overlights, except where later altered.

Ground‑floor windows are single 12‑pane sashes, except at No. 5 where they are three‑part windows, all with panelled aprons below. First‑floor windows are tall 12 or 15‑pane sashes; those at Nos. 1, 5 and 9 have raised surrounds, with the centre windows topped by small pediments on brackets. Second‑floor windows are shorter 12‑pane sashes, with their sills linked in a continuous band. A moulded cornice runs across the whole front. No. 5 has a three‑bay attic parapet with uneven nine‑pane windows; the other attic windows are flat dormers with two‑light Yorkshire sashes or casements. The first‑floor windows share a continuous balcony with iron balustrading fixed back to the wall.

=== Interior ===
Several houses contain staircases with ornate balustrades. Decorative plasterwork includes a Greek‑style frieze in No. 6, and many original fireplaces remain.

== See also ==
- Grade II* listed buildings in the City of York
- Listed buildings in York (within the city walls, northern part)
