= York Conservation Trust =

Trust to restore buildings in York, England

The York Conservation Trust is a buildings preservation trust and custodian of 80 significant historical buildings in York and North Yorkshire, England. The Trust restores and cares for these buildings, making them available to rent to commercial and residential tenants. A charity, the Trust's income is derived almost entirely from these rents, which is in turn put back into the care of its portfolio.

It was originally an initiative of former Lord Mayor John Bowes Morrell, who started acquiring old buildings when he bought Sir Thomas Herbert's House on Pavement in 1943. Together with his brother, Cuthbert, Morrell set up the Ings Property Company, a not-for-profit exercise in practical conservation. In 1976 this company was given charitable status and evolved into York Conservation Trust.

The Trust owns properties throughout York in streets such as Walmgate, Micklegate, Goodramgate, Gillygate and Stonegate. Among its portfolio are The Red House in Duncombe Place, the York Assembly Rooms in Blake Street and the De Grey Rooms and De Grey House next to York Theatre Royal. The Trust also bought Fairfax House from York Civic Trust and rents it back to them. its most recent acquisition was in 2018, and since then, the Trust has been working on a forward strategy of repair and retrofit improvements to its portfolio. Working to a ten-year plan, all income is committed to the care of the Trust's over 80 Historic buildings.

In 2010, York Conservation Trust published York Conservation Trust – Historical Properties Walking Guide. This listed the properties it owned at the time, giving historical and descriptive information and encouraging walking around York to view them.

A number of the current trustees are related to John Bowes Morrell.
