= The Citadel, York =

Listed church in York, England

The Citadel
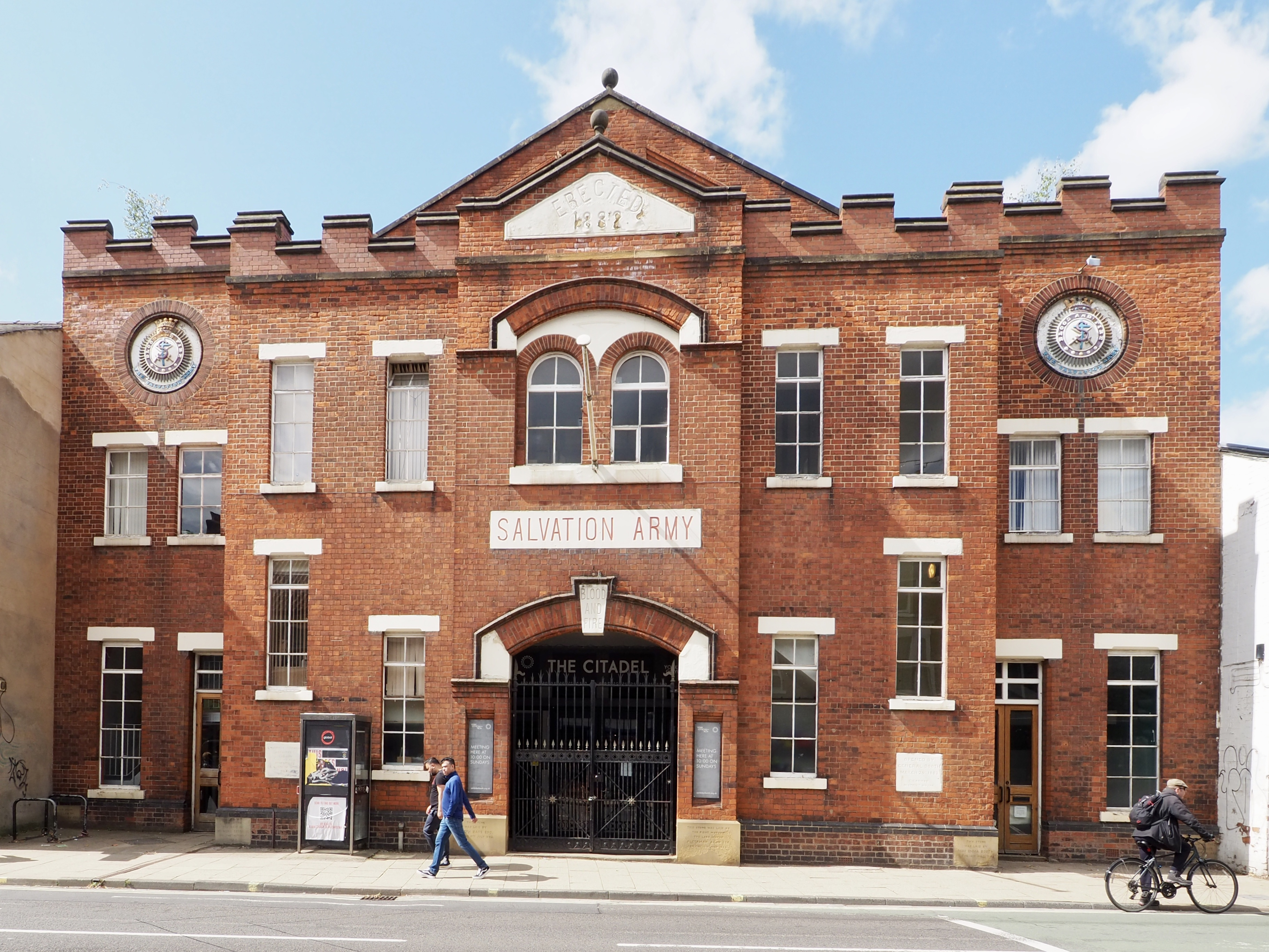
- The church in 2021
- The Citadel
- 53.964866°N 1.083425°W
- OS grid reference: SE 60221 52481
- Address: Gillygate, York, England
- Denomination: Evangelical Alliance
- Website: yorkcitychurch.org.uk

History
- Status: Active
- Consecrated: 1883; 143 years ago

Architecture
- Heritage designation: Grade II listed
- Architect: Edmund James Sherwood
- Groundbreaking: 1882; 144 years ago

Specifications
- Materials: Brick

The Citadel is a historic church on Gillygate, immediately north of the city centre of York, England.

The Salvation Army first held meetings in York at a skating rink on Gillygate. In 1882, it purchased a site on the street to erect a place of worship. The building was designed by Edmund James Sherwood and was opened in 1883 by William Booth. Construction cost £3,265, and on completion it could seat 2,000 worshippers. The building was Grade II listed in 1990. In 2014, the Salvation Army moved to a temporary location elsewhere in the city. In 2015, the building became the home of the York City Church. In 2026, its meeting space and cafe were restored at a cost of £300,000. In addition to church events, the building is used for meetings of community groups, pop-up restaurants, gigs, and full meetings of York City Council.

The building is constructed of red brick, with stone dressings and slate roofs which have ball finials to the gables. It has two storeys and is nine bays wide, with the central section slightly projecting. In the centre is an arched opening with iron gates and a plaque above reading "SALVATION ARMY". Above are a pair of round-headed windows, and above them a small gable with an inscription reading "ERECTED 1882". Flanking the central section are staggered staircase windows, and on either side of these are recessed two-bay wings with doorways, casement windows, and circular panels with coats of arms. Above the front is a battlement. Inside, there is a gallery on the north, south and east sides, with the galleries below screened off to reduce the size of the main hall and provide additional rooms.

== See also ==
- Listed buildings in York (outside the city walls, northern part)
