= Daniel Henry Haigh =

English runologist and numismatist

Daniel Henry Haigh

Daniel Henry Haigh (7 August 1819 — 10 May 1879) was a Victorian scholar of Anglo-Saxon history and literature, as well as a runologist and numismatist.

== Biography ==
Haigh was born 7 August 1819 at Brinscall Hall in the village of Brinscall in Lancashire, but his family came from Huddersfield and he grew up in Yorkshire, so he considered himself a Yorkshireman. His father died when he was still a child, and his mother when he was sixteen, leaving him the eldest of three orphan brothers, who shared a large inheritance. Haigh initially went into business in Leeds, but soon turned to the church, and trained to become an Anglican priest at St Saviour's church in Leeds. However, he lost faith in the Church of England, and on New Year's Day 1847 he joined the Roman Catholic church. On 8 April 1848 he was ordained as a priest at the seminary of St Mary's College, Oscott. He used his personal fortune to build a church at Erdington, near Birmingham. The church was designed by Charles Hansom, and cost him £15,000. The foundation stone was laid on the feast of St Augustine (26 May 1848), and was consecrated by Bishop Ullathorne on 11 June 1850. He lived at Erdington, as a priest, where he shared his house with about a dozen orphans. He retired in 1876, suffering from poor health and bronchitis, and went to live at St Mary's College, Oscott, where he died on 10 May 1879 after a short illness.

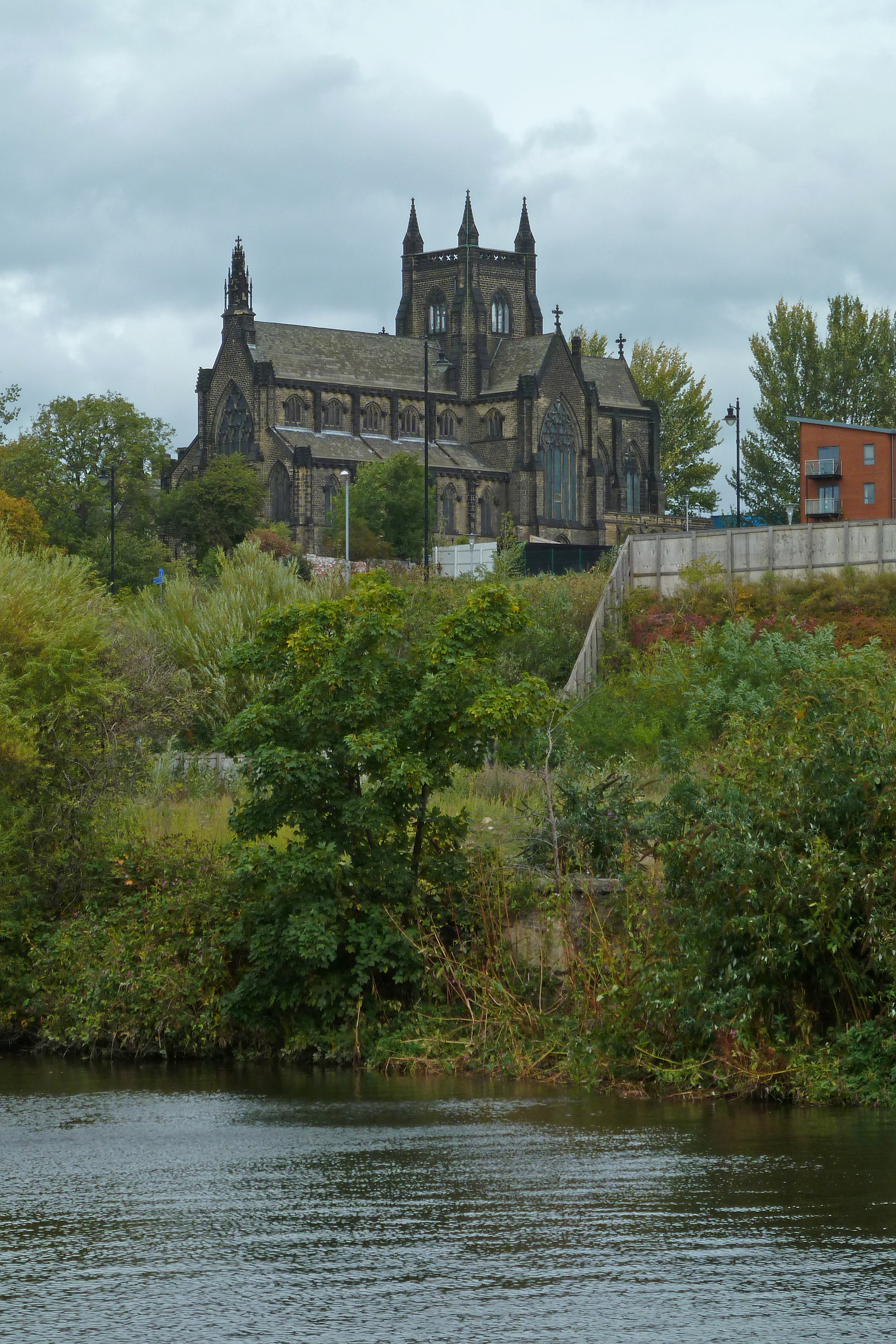
St Saviour, Leeds

== Academic writings ==
=== Epigraphy ===
Although Haigh did not have any formal academic training, he dedicated himself to the study of Anglo-Saxon history and literature, and wrote two influential works on Anglo-Saxon history, The Anglo-Saxon Sagas and The Conquest of Britain by the Saxons, both published in 1861. He wrote a number of studies of Anglo-Saxon runic inscriptions. However, his transcriptions and interpretations of runic monuments have been criticized by Raymond Page as "often erratic, showing an eagerness to find runes where none exist".

Haigh also studied Egyptian hieroglyphs and Assyrian Cuneiform inscriptions, contributing several articles to Zeitschrift für Ägyptische Sprache und Alterthumskunde.

=== Numismatics ===
Haigh wrote several papers on early medieval numismatics, and examined part of the St Leonard's Place hoard.

== Works ==
- 1845. An essay on the Numismatic history of the ancient kingdom of the East Angles. Leeds.
- 1857. "The Saxon Cross at Bewcastle"; in Archaeologia Aeliana New Series vol.I.
- 1858. Notes on the History of S. Begu & S. Hild; and on some relics of antiquity discovered in the sites of the religious establishments founded by them. Hartlepool.
- 1861. The Anglo-Saxon Sagas; an examination of their value as aids to history; a sequel to the "History of the Conquest of Britain by the Saxons" London: John Russel Smith. Reprint, Read Books, 2008. ISBN 978-1-4097-8131-8
- 1861. The Conquest of Britain by the Saxons : a harmony of the "Historia Britonum," the writings of Gildas, the "Brut", and the Saxon chronicle with reference to the events of the fifth and sixth centuries. Reprint, Kessinger Publishing, 2008. ISBN 978-1-4365-9112-6
- 1870. "Coins of Alfred the Great"; in Numismatic Chronicle vol.10 pp. 19–39.
- 1870. "The Runic Monuments of Northumbria"; in Proceedings of the Yorkshire Geological Society vol.5 pp. 178–217.
- 1872. "On the Jute Angel and Saxon Royal Pedigrees"; in Archæologia Cantiana vol.8 pp. 18–49.
- 1872. "Notes in Illustration of the Runic Monuments of Kent"; in Archæologia Cantiana vol.8 pp. 164–270.
- 1873. "Yorkshire Runic Monuments"; in Yorkshire Archaeological Journal vol.2 pp. 252–288.
