= Exhibition Square =

Open space in York, England

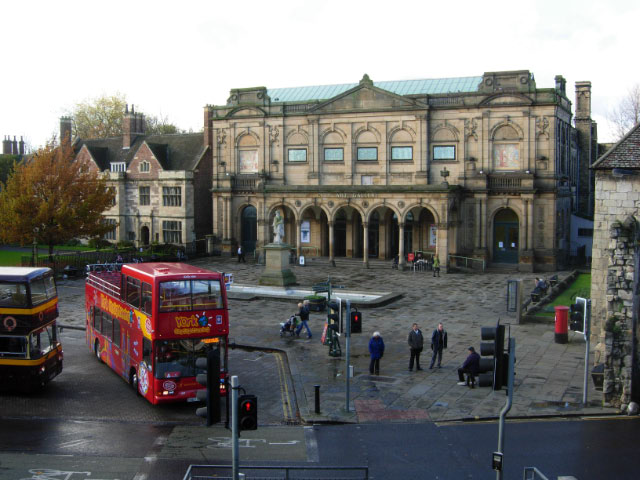
- Exhibition Square, seen from Bootham Bar
- Location within York
- Maintained by: City of York
- Location: York, England
- Coordinates: 53.9628°N 1.0857°W
- East: St Leonard's Place

Construction
- Completion: 1879; 146 years ago

Exhibition Square is an open space in the city centre of York, England.

== History ==
The area covered by the square lay immediately outside the walls of Roman Eboracum and the Mediaeval York city walls, but within the walls of neighbouring St Mary's Abbey. By the 19th-century, the site was being used as a nursery by a Mr Bearpark. In 1833, the section of the city walls was demolished, to enable the construction of St Leonard's Place.

An Art and Industrial Exhibition was held on Bootham, in York, in 1866, and in 1876 it was decided to hold a further exhibition. Bearpark's nursery was leased, while a house and the Bird in Hand pub were demolished, to clear the site. In 1879, Exhibition Square was built on the south-eastern part of the land, with the exhibition hall to its north-west, part of which survives as the York Art Gallery.

The square is now the main location for the start of bus tours of the city, and also of walking tours run by the Association of Voluntary Guides to the City of York.

== Layout and architecture ==
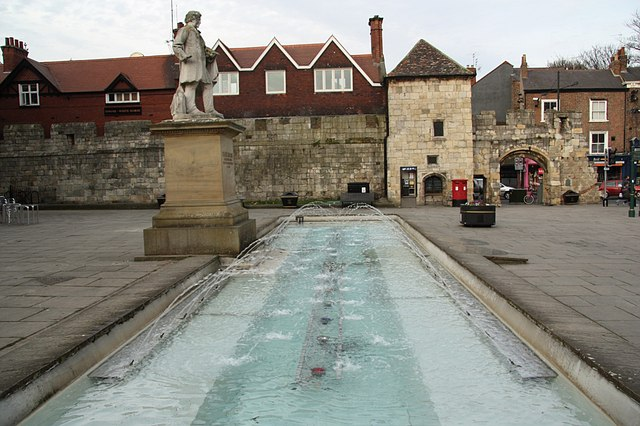
Looking north-east across the square

The square lies to the west of the northernmost section of St Leonard's Place, where it meets Bootham. Bootham Bar, on the city walls, is opposite. On the north-eastern side of the square is part of the abbey boundary wall, including Bootham Tower and Queen Margaret's Arch, which leads to Bootham's junction with Gillygate. York Art Gallery lies on the north-western side, and King's Manor on the south-western side. The railings in front of King's Manor were originally built in 1726 for York Mansion House.

In 1911, a statue of William Etty was placed in the centre of the square, to a design by G. W. Milburn. In 1971, the square was pedestrianised, and the York Civic Trust constructed a fountain in front of the statue of Etty.
