= The Gillygate =

Listed pub in York, England

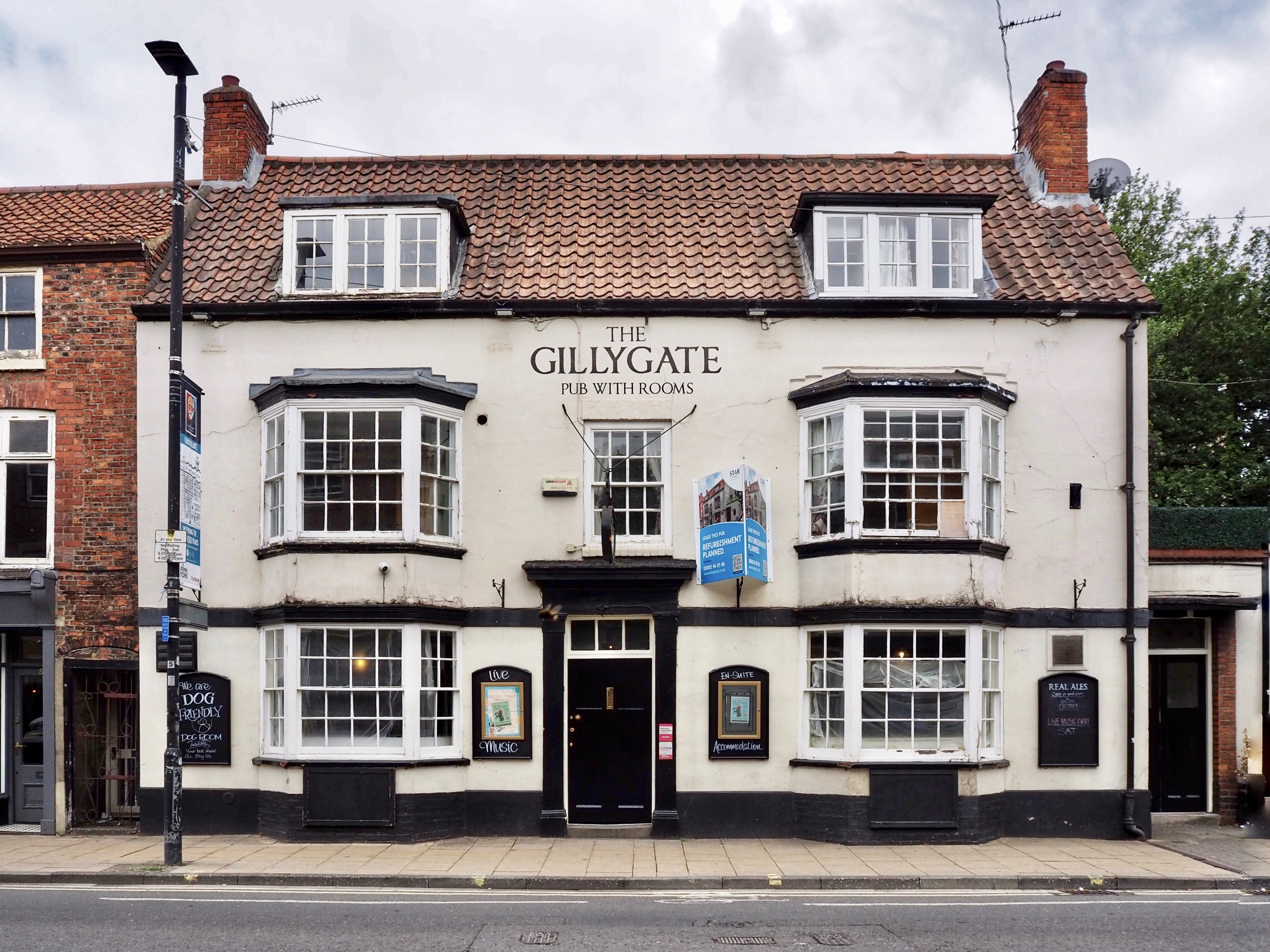
- The pub in 2025
- Interactive map of the The Gillygate area
- Former names: Waggon and Horses
- Alternative names: Gillygate Inn

General information
- Type: Public house
- Location: 48 Gillygate, York, England
- Coordinates: 53.9640°N 1.0838°W
- Year built: Mid-19th century
- Renovated: 20th century (altered); 2003 and 2014 (refurbished)
- Owner: Heineken UK

Design and construction
- Designations

Listed Building – Grade II
- Official name: Waggon and Horses public house
- Designated: 24 June 1983
- Reference no.: 1257784

The Gillygate (formerly the Waggon and Horses, under which it is officially listed), is a Grade II listed public house offering accommodation on Gillygate in York, England. The listing describes the building as mid‑19th‑century, while BBC News reports that the pub dates back to 1811. The site was included in the Central Historic Core conservation area in 1968. Renamed The Gillygate in 2003 after refurbishment, the pub was put up for sale in 2021 and closed in 2022. It reopened in 2023, and by August 2026 its freehold was owned by Heineken UK.

== History ==
The building was constructed in the mid‑19th century as the Waggon and Horses public house and was later altered during the 20th century, according to its official listing. BBC News reports that the pub dates back to 1811.

In 1968, the site was included within the newly established Central Historic Core conservation area, and on 24 June 1983, the Waggon and Horses was designated a Grade II listed building.

In March 2003, The Press reported that the Waggon and Horses would be renamed The Gillygate following a month-long refurbishment. The pub underwent unspecified refurbishment works in 2014. In 2021 it was put up for sale, and it closed in July 2022, with an insolvency practitioner appointed. It reopened under new management in May 2023, but by early 2024 was operating under temporary management while Star Pubs sought a new licensee. In March 2026, plans for new external signage and lighting were refused by City of York Council. The building operates as a pub with rooms, though the number of bedrooms is not specified in available sources. As of August 2026, the pub's freehold is owned by Heineken UK.

== Architecture ==
The building has painted render with brick visible below the bay windows. It has a pantiled roof. The front is arranged over two storeys with an attic and three bays. The windows are sash types with glazing bars, and the outer bays contain two‑storey canted bays. The attic is lit by two flat‑roofed dormers with casement windows. The central bay has a doorway framed by pilasters, with a rectangular light above and a cornice. A horizontal band between the storeys is broken by the bay windows. There are chimneys on the gables.

== See also ==
- Listed buildings in York (outside the city walls, northern part)
