= Sir Thomas Herbert's House =

Grade I listed building in York, England

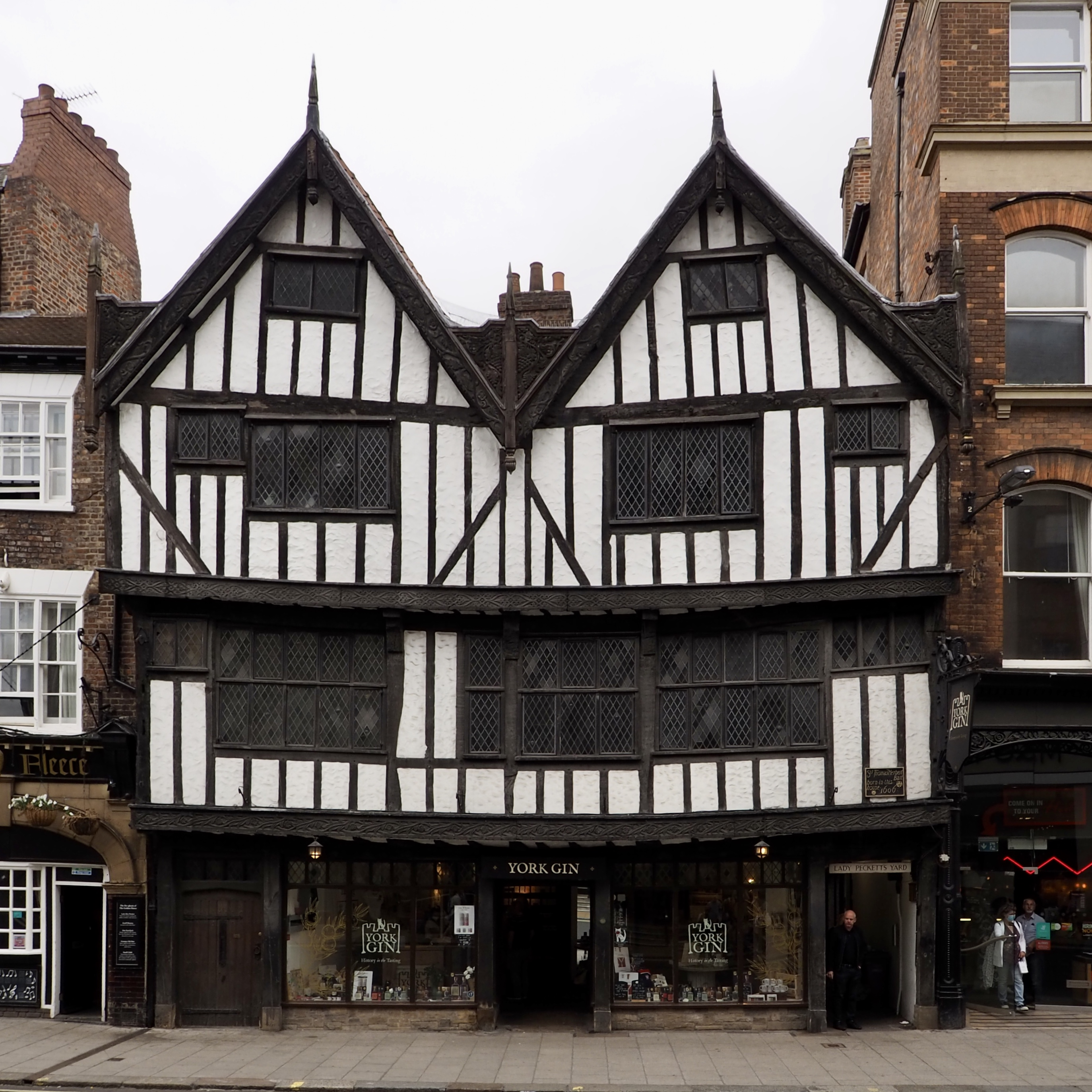
- The house, seen from Pavement

- Location within York City Centre
- Alternative names: Herbert House

General information
- Location: Pavement, York, England
- Coordinates: 53°57′31″N 1°04′47″W
- Years built: Mid-16th and early 17th century
- Renovated: Late 19th century (extended, restored); 1925 (partly rebuilt, shopfront, rear house re-roofed)

Design and construction
- Designations

Listed Building – Grade I
- Official name: The Herbert House
- Designated: 14 June 1954
- Reference no.: 1256914

Sir Thomas Herbert's House, often known as Herbert House, is a Grade I listed building in York, dating from the mid-16th and early 17th centuries.

== History ==
In the mid-16th century, the Company of Merchant Adventurers of York owned a house on Marketshire, a street which was becoming known as Pavement. They let out the house to Christopher Herbert, a merchant who later became Lord Mayor of York. He purchased the property in 1557, and later passed it on to his son, Thomas, who acquired properties including one neighbouring to the rear, facing onto Lady Peckett's Yard. This rear property is the building now separately Grade II*-listed as No. 11. In 1606, Thomas' grandson was born in the house. He later became Sir Thomas Herbert, 1st Baronet, and the house is now named after him.

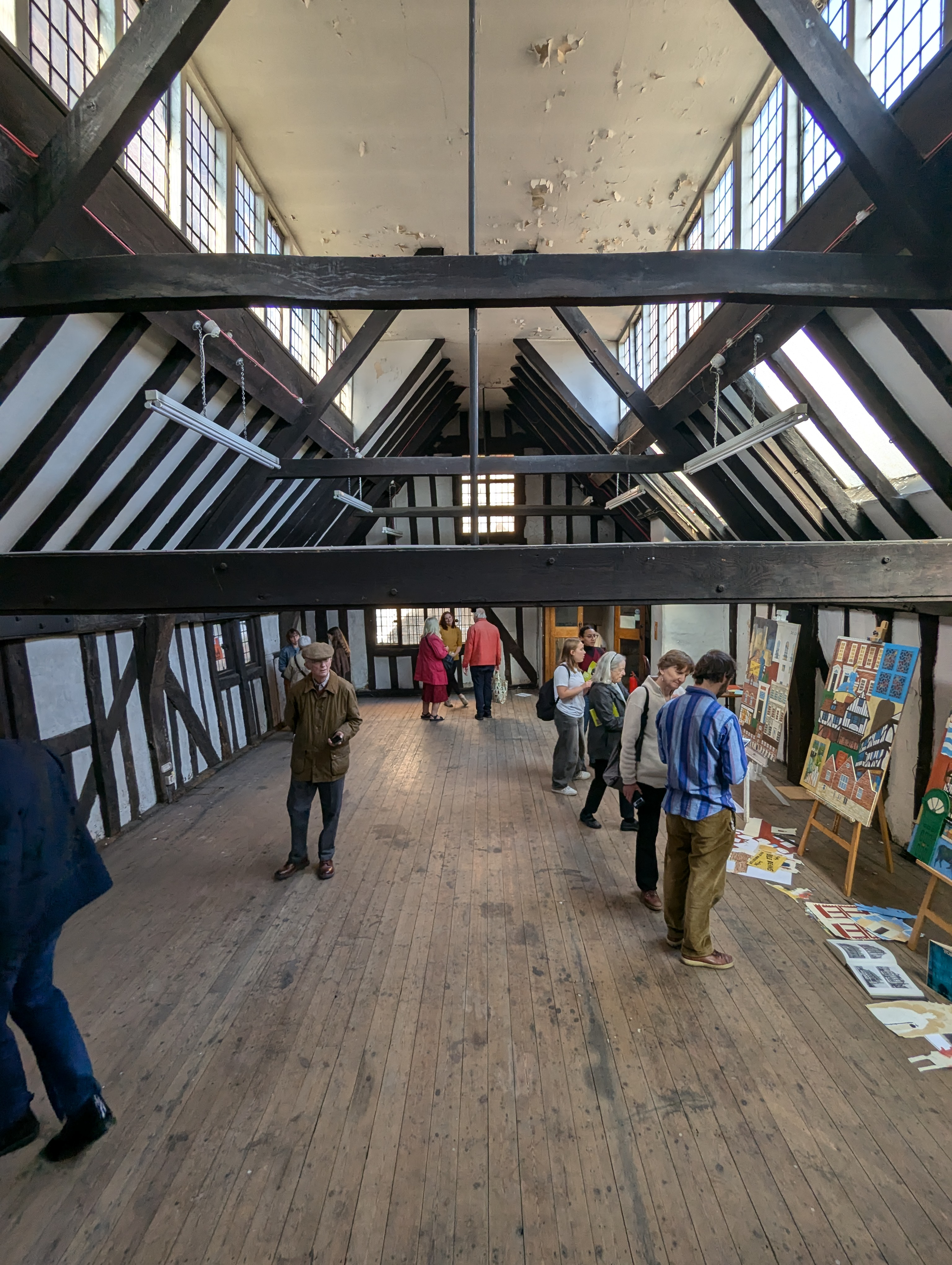
The first floor hall

After the older Thomas' death in 1614, the property passed to another merchant, John Jaques, who is believed to have rebuilt the house facing onto Pavement. Jacques then passed the property onto his son, Roger, who sold it in 1647. In 1648, the new owner of the properties demolished the northern end of the house facing onto Lady Peckett's Yard, and constructed a new block, linking the two houses, with a main entrance and staircase. This entrance, and the whole of Lady Peckett's Yard, were accessed through a passage, under the west end of the Pavement part of the house. In the 1660s, a further block was added to the south of the existing house, linking to another mid-16th century house, further down Lady Peckett's Yard.

Early in the 19th century, the easternmost part of the house was demolished, and replaced by the Golden Fleece pub. In 1869, an extension was added to the southernmost section of the house. Around this time, a single-storey extension was added in front of the entrance on Lady Peckett's Yard, and the facade on Pavement was renovated. By the 1920s, the house was in use as a drapers' shop, with a warehouse to the rear. It had become dilapidated, and the Victorian external plastering with fake stonework had fallen out of favour. Francis W. B. Yorke restored the property, for use by an insurance company. He exposed the timber framing, and added new external decoration, windows and finials based on surviving examples. Internally, he discovered small sections of wall paintings and paintings on beams in the main hall, and he restored panelling in the first floor parlour, in part by using panelling from the second floor.

In more recent years, the ground floor has again been used as a shop. For many years, it was operated by Jones the Bootmaker. Since 2019, it has been occupied by York Gin.

== Architecture ==
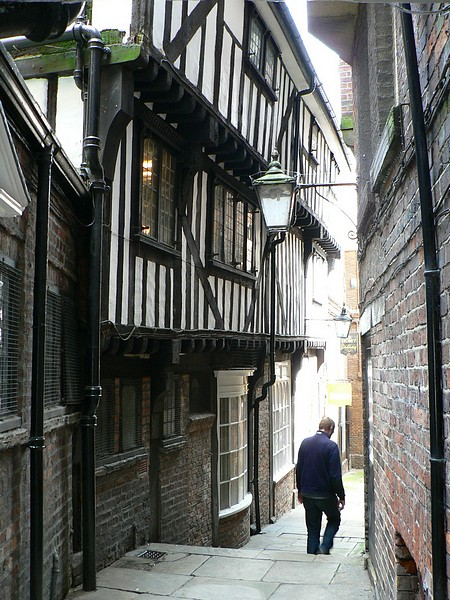
Facade facing Lady Peckett's Yard

The part of the house facing Pavement has three main storeys, plus cellars and attics. The ground floor is open and does not retain any original features, and it extends into the link building. The first floor is one large parlour, and contains a highly ornate fireplace. Its facade is timber framed, with the floors jettied out, while to the side, it is built of brick. The section facing onto Lady Peckett's Yard is all timber framed, but with the ground floor largely rebuilt in brick. Internally, each floor is now open and without original features.

== See also ==
- Grade I listed buildings in the City of York
- Listed buildings in York (within the city walls, southern part)
