= St Leonard's Place =

Street in York, England

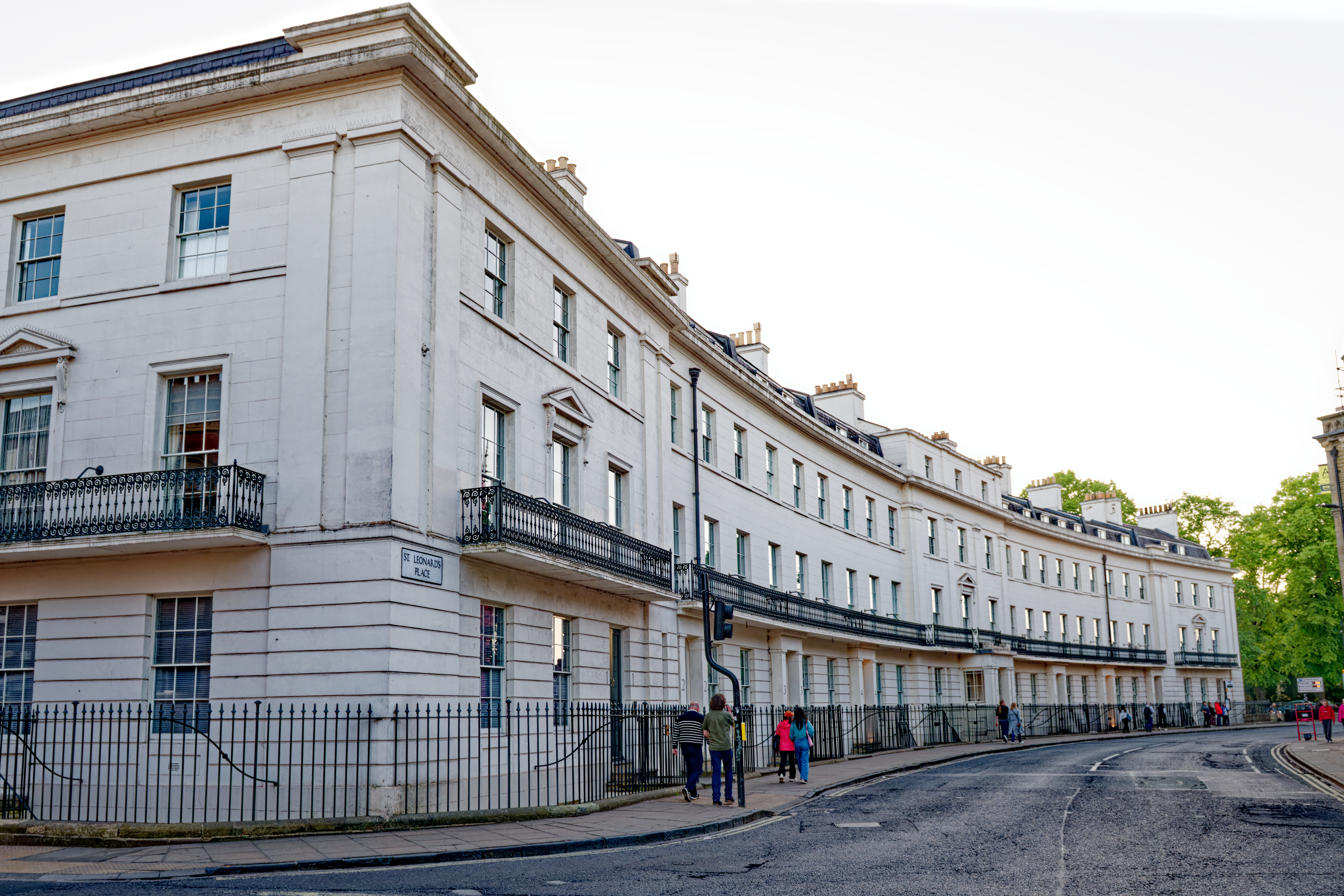
- 1–9 St Leonard's Place in 2024
- Location within York
- Location: York, England
- Postal code: YO
- Coordinates: 53.9622°N 1.0855°W
- North end: Bootham; Gillygate
- Major junctions: Exhibition Square
- South end: Blake Street; Duncombe Place; Museum Street

Construction
- Completion: 1835

Other
- Known for: Listed buildings

St Leonard's Place is a street in York, England.

== History ==
The site of the street lay mostly within the walls of Roman Eboracum, and excavations in the area have uncovered two Anglo-Saxon carved stones and a large coin hoard. In the medieval period the location formed part of St Leonard's Hospital, which from 1546 until 1698 operated as a royal mint, giving rise to the name "Mint Yard". In 1675 the Corporation of York purchased Mint Yard for £543.

The construction of the street was proposed in 1831, with the intention that it would be built up with "genteel private residences". It runs across the line of the York city walls, a section of which was demolished along with the barbican of Bootham Bar. Although there were plans to demolish Bootham Bar entirely, this did not occur. The street opened in 1835, and construction of the houses was completed in 1842.

In 1844, workmen digging a drain discovered a hoard of about 10,000 Northumbrian stycas, many of which were sold privately, although part of the hoard is now held by the Yorkshire Museum.

The expense of constructing the street left the York Corporation in debt. Costs included paving the street with macadam and providing a new facade for the York Theatre Royal, which had previously faced Little Blake Street but from 1835 had its main entrance on St Leonard's Place. The street became a popular centre for entertainment: the York Subscription Library opened in 1836; the Yorkshire Club operated for a period at No. 5; and the De Grey Rooms, used for concerts and meetings, opened in 1842. The new York and North Midland Railway established its head office on the street. Early residents included the Recorder of York, C. H. Elsby; the town clerk, Robert Davies; and the architect John Harper.

In 1933, the expiry of many 99-year leases allowed the Corporation of York to convert the main terrace into council offices. It vacated the buildings in 2013, after which they were converted back into housing. The street forms part of York's inner ring road, and although the council has investigated pedestrianising it, this would require an alternative route, including a new bridge across the River Ouse.

== Layout and architecture ==
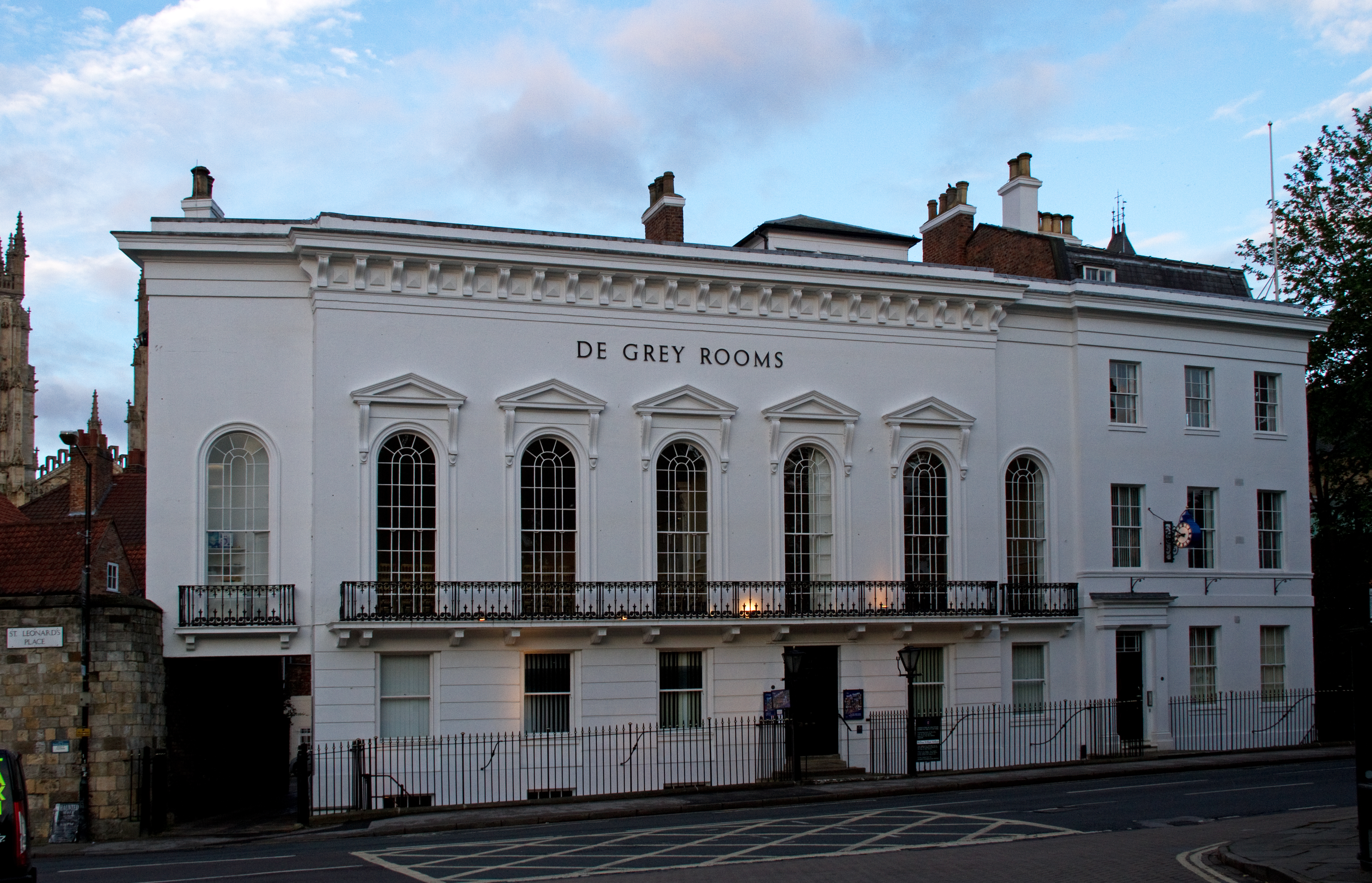
The De Grey Rooms and De Grey House

The street runs north from the junction of Blake Street, Duncombe Place and Museum Street, curving gently to Exhibition Square, where it meets High Petergate and Bootham.

Much of the western side is occupied by the terrace of Nos. 1–9, designed by Harper and completed in 1834. A small garden containing a stretch of the Roman city wall lies further north, before the street opens into Exhibition Square. On the eastern side stand De Grey House, completed in 1835 and used for many years from 1909 by the York Conservative Club; the De Grey Rooms; and the York Theatre Royal.

== See also ==
- Listed buildings in York (within the city walls, northern part)
