= Gillygate =

Street in York, England

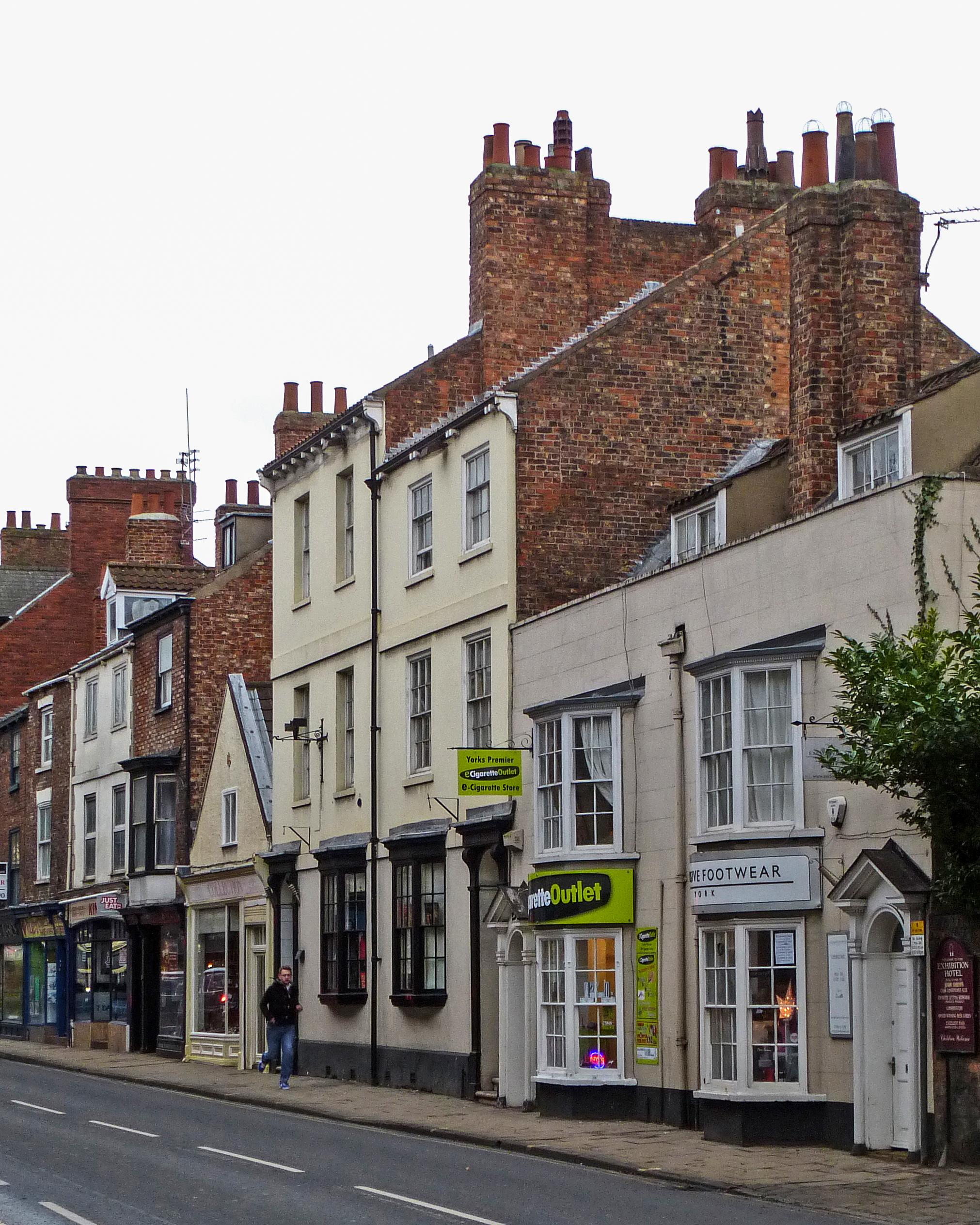
- View south-west along Gillygate
- Location within York
- Former names: Marketshire; Ousegate
- Location: York, England
- Postal code: YO
- Coordinates: 53.9642°N 1.0840°W
- North east end: Lord Mayor's Walk; Clarence Street; Claremont Terrace
- South west end: Bootham

Gillygate is a street in York, England, immediately north of the city centre.

== History ==
The area occupied by the street lay outside the walls of Roman Eboracum, but evidence of occupation from this period has been found, and it is possible that a minor Roman road ran along its route. During the Anglo-Saxon and Viking Jorvik period, the area appears to have been abandoned. Gillygate was first recorded in the 12th century, when the church of St Giles, Gillygate, which gives the street its name, stood on the north-west side. The south-east side was largely gardens owned by St Leonard's Hospital, but was gradually becoming built up with houses. In 1354, the street was placed under the jurisdiction of the city of York.

By 1401, a chapel dedicated to St Antony existed on the street, but this was replaced by St Antony's Hospital by 1420 and became a private house in 1558. St Giles Church was demolished in the 16th century, although burials in its graveyard continued into the following century, and the north-west side of the street remained largely open fields in the 17th century. Some small-scale industry existed in this period, including stone and coal yards, a smithy, and a clay-pipe manufacturer.

Although Gillygate lies just north-west of the city walls, unlike elsewhere on their circuit the buildings screening the wall have not been cleared, and the walls can only be glimpsed occasionally from the street. In 1972, Nikolaus Pevsner described Gillygate as "a run-down Georgian Street with two interesting houses", these being Nos. 3–5 and Nos. 26–28. It is now a street with predominantly independent shops. In 2013, City of York Council stated that "over the last 30 years, the quality of shops and businesses here has risen generally". However, it forms part of the city's inner ring road and carries heavy traffic.

== Layout and architecture ==
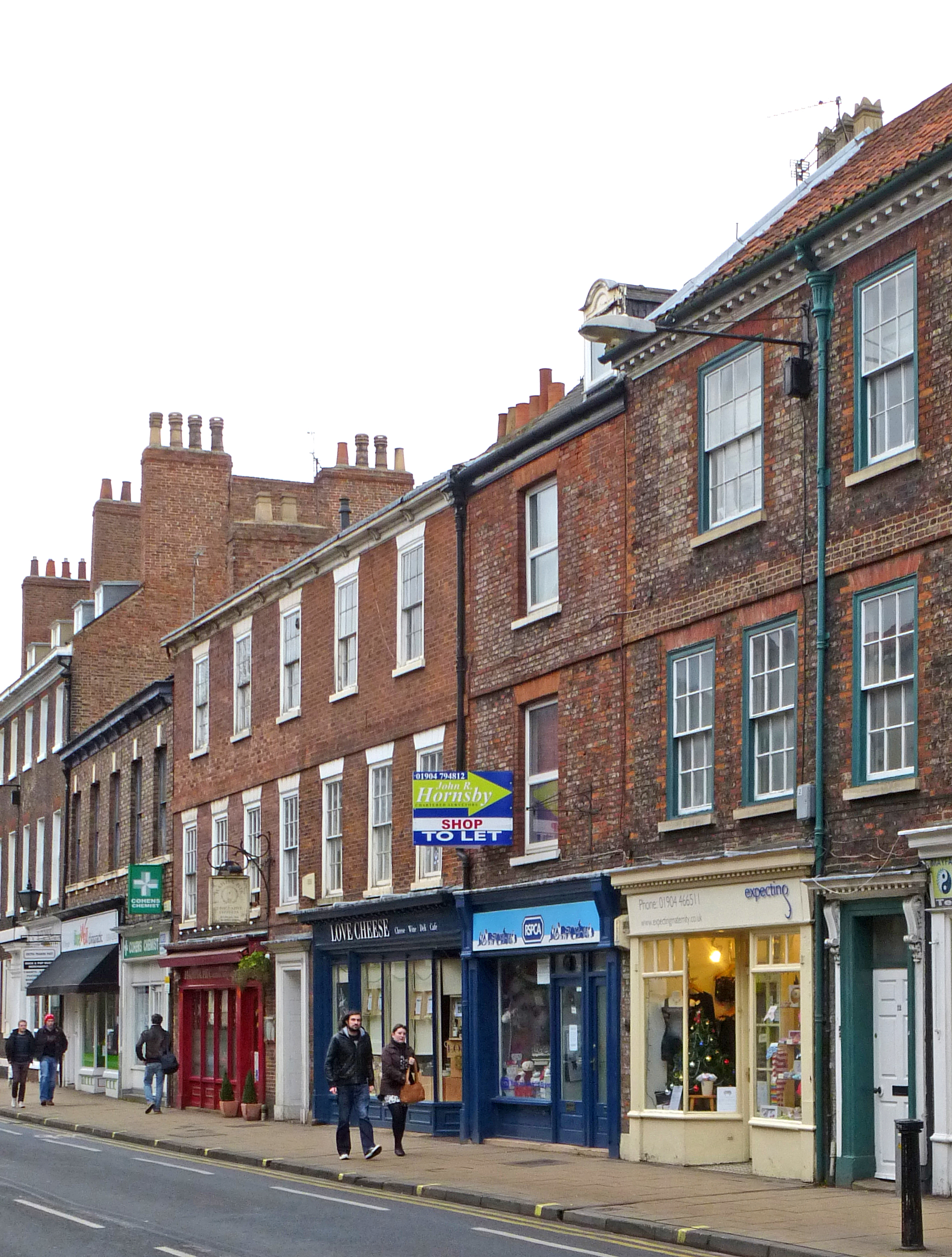
View north-west along Gillygate

Gillygate starts at a junction with Bootham, opposite Queen Margaret's Arch, through which Exhibition Square can be accessed. The junction is close to Bootham Bar and St Leonard's Place. The street runs north-east, with several junctions on its north-west side, leading to Millers Yard, St Giles Yard, St Giles Gate and Portland Street, before ending at a junction with Lord Mayor's Walk, Clarence Street and Claremont Terrace.

Notable buildings on the north-west side of the street include Nos. 3–5, built in 1797 by Thomas Wolstenholme; 18th-century houses at Nos. 23–25; early-19th-century buildings at Nos. 65–69; and The Citadel, a former Salvation Army building.

On the south-east side lie Nos. 2–2B from the late 19th century; early-18th-century houses at Nos. 12–12A; Nos. 26–28, built in 1769 by Robert Clough; the late-18th-century Nos. 38–40; The Gillygate pub at No. 48, built in the mid-19th century and formerly the Waggon and Horses; No. 64, the oldest building on the street, with 17th-century origins; then more late-18th-century houses at No. 66, No. 68, and No. 70; and the early-19th-century Nos. 84–86.
