= John Peckett =

English mayor & sheriff

John Peckett was the Lord Mayor of York through 1701–1702. He also served as the city's Sheriff in 1695. He was married to Alice Pawson, whose well-connected family succeeded John several times. The house he rebuilt around 1700 on the snickelway later known as Lady Peckett's Yard is now the Grade II*-listed No. 11.
