= St Nicholas' Church, Butterwick =

Anglican church in Butterwick, England

Coordinates: 54°07′47″N 0°29′04″W

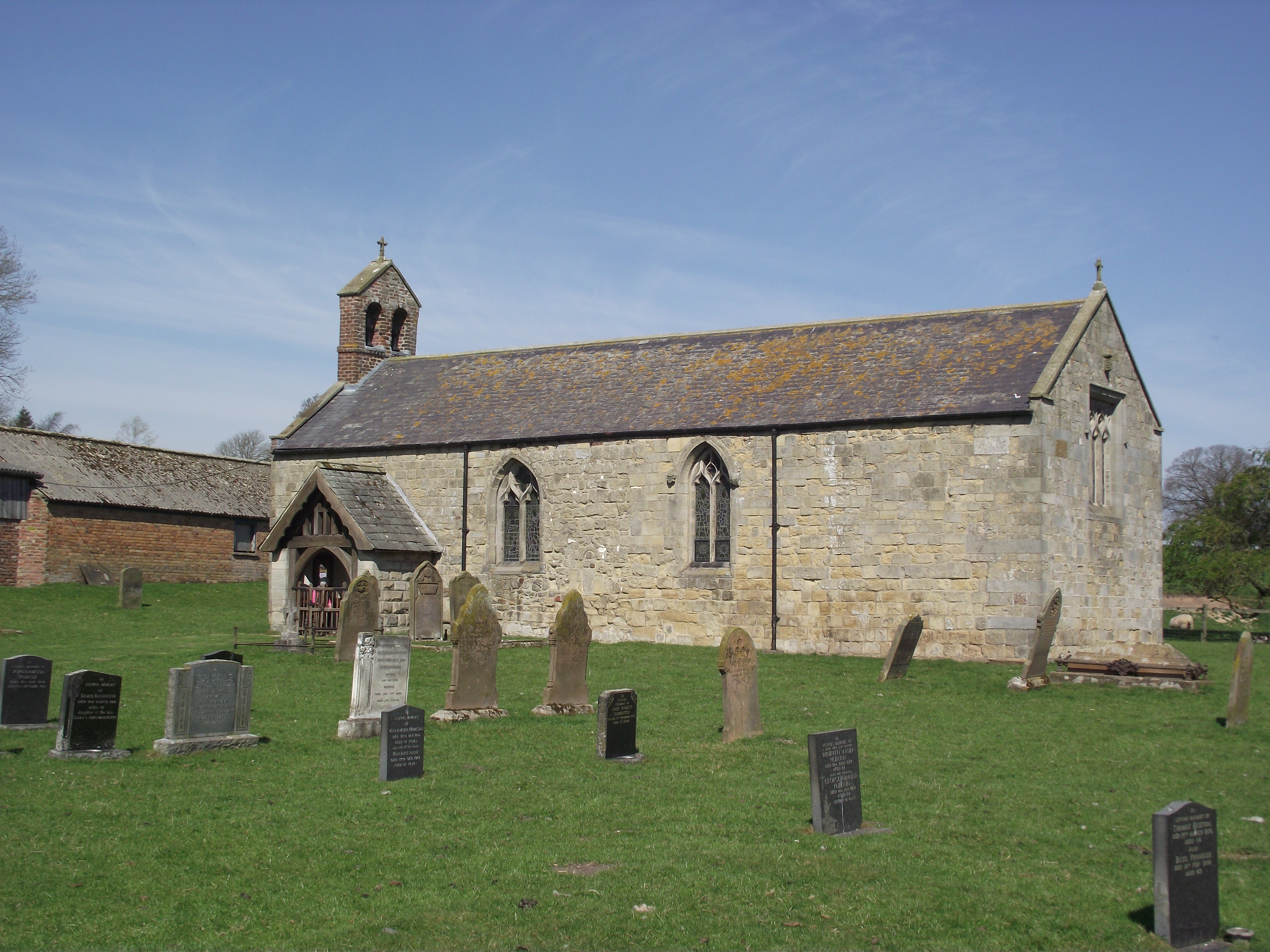
The church in 2013

St Nicholas' Church is an Anglican church in Butterwick, a village in North Yorkshire, in England.

The church was first mentioned in about 1130, at which time it was a chapel of ease of St Mary's Church, Foxholes. Most of the chapel was rebuilt in the 14th century, with only the walls of the western part of the building surviving from the older church. A bellcote was added in the late 18th century, and the church was restored from 1882 to 1883 by G. Fowler Jones. He extended the building, and added a porch. The church was grade II* listed in 1966.

The church is built in sandstone with some red brick, and has a slate roof. It consists of a nave and a chancel in one unit, and a south porch, with a bellcote on the west gable. The bellcote is gabled and contains two round arched openings and has a cross finial. The porch has a Tudor arched doorway and a scalloped bargeboard. Inside, there is a 12th-century drum font, a piscina and aumbry, a late 13th century graveslab, and an early 14th century effigy, believed to be of Robert FitzRalph.

== See also ==
- Grade II* listed churches in North Yorkshire (district)
- Listed buildings in Foxholes, North Yorkshire
