= Listed buildings in Kildale =

Kildale is a civil parish in the county of North Yorkshire, England. It contains 32 listed buildings that are recorded in the National Heritage List for England. All the listed buildings are designated at Grade II, the lowest of the three grades, which is applied to "buildings of national importance and special interest". The parish contains the village of Kildale and the surrounding countryside and moorland. Most of the listed buildings are houses, cottages, and associated strictures, farmhouses and farm buildings, and the others include a wayside cross, a church and tombs in the churchyard, a bridge, a former school and schoolmaster's house, and the chimney of a former ironstone workings.

== Buildings ==
Name and location	Photograph	Date	Notes
Percy Rigg Cross; 54.49830°N 1.06455°W		Medieval (probable)	The cross base is in stone, and it has a square plan and chamfered sides. In the centre is a socket with a cut-off section of shaft. On the west side is a benchmark.
Farm building west of Lonsdale Farmhouse; 54.48901°N 1.06717°W		17th century	A house, later a farm building, it was remodelled in the late 18th century, and is in stone and with a pantile roof and a stone ridge and coping. It is long, with a single storey, and contains doorways and altered windows.
Fern Deep; 54.47665°N 1.06383°W	—	1691	A rectory, later extended and subsequently a private house, in stone, with a Welsh slate roof on the later part, and a pantile roof with stone ridges, copings and kneelers elsewhere. The earlier part has an eaves band, two storeys, three bays, and a single-storey bay on the left. It contains a doorway with a chamfered quoined surround, and an initialled and dated lintel with a triangular soffit. To the right is a French window, and the other windows are horizontally-sliding sashes. The later part projects and is gabled, and it has two storeys and fronts of two bays, oversailing eaves and sash windows.
Percy Rigg Farmhouse and cowhouse range 54.48342°N 1.03039°W		c. 1700 (probable)	The buildings are in stone, with eaves bands, and pantile roofs with stone ridges, copings and shaped kneelers. The house has two storeys and three bays, on a plinth, and contains a mix of windows, some are horizontally-sliding sashes, and the ground floor openings have keystones. The cowhouse is lower with a loft, on a plinth, and it contains quoins, doorways, slit vents and a blocked pitching hole. The cowhouse range extends further, forming a courtyard.
Rowland chest tomb 54.47800°N 1.06861°W	—	c. 1714	The chest tomb is in the churchyard of St Cuthbert's Church, to the southeast of the church. It is in stone, and has a chamfered lid and a worn inscription commemorating Francis Rowland.
Dunn chest tomb 54.47791°N 1.06880°W	—	c. 1716	The chest tomb is in the churchyard of St Cuthbert's Church, to the south of the church. It is in stone, and has a chamfered lid and inscriptions commemorating members of the Dunn family.
Farm building southwest of Dundale Beck Farmhouse; 54.46743°N 1.08645°W	—	Mid 18th century (probable)	A barn/byre in stone, with an eaves band, and a pantile roof with a stone ridge, coping and hollowed kneelers. There is one storey and a loft, and three bays. It contains stable doors and slit vents.
Pair of chest tombs 54.47799°N 1.06880°W	—	Mid 18th century	The pair of chest tombs is in the churchyard of St Cuthbert's Church, to the south of the church. The tombs are in stone, and have lids with moulded edges, and raised panels with worn inscriptions.
West House; 54.47586°N 1.02189°W		Mid to late 18th century	A farmhouse in stone on a plinth, with an eaves band, and a pantile roof with a stone ridge, coping and moulded kneelers. There are two storeys and an attic, three bays and a rear outshut. The windows are sashes, some horizontally-sliding, with keystones.
Farm buildings east of West House; 54.47579°N 1.02170°W	—	Mid to late 18th century	The pigsty and the cowhouse block are in stone, and have pantile roofs with stone ridges, copings and block kneelers. The pigsty has an eaves band, one storey and two bays, and loose boxes behind. It contains stable doors and trough chutes. The cowhouse block has three bays, a window and a loft, and contains stable doors and windows.
Linkon chest tomb 54.47795°N 1.06863°W	—	c. 1774	The chest tomb is in the churchyard of St Cuthbert's Church, to the south of the church. It is in stone, and has an inscription commemorating members of the Linkon family.
Little Kildale; 54.47463°N 1.05230°W		Late 18th century	A row of four cottages in stone on a plinth, with an eaves band, and a pantile roof with a stone ridge, coping and block kneelers. Most of the windows are from the 20th-century, some are horizontally-sliding sashes, and the openings have long lintels and raised keystones.
Low Farmhouse and cowhouse 54.46511°N 1.07374°W	—	Late 18th century	The buildings are in stone, with eaves bands, and pantile roofs with stone ridges, coping and block kneelers. The farmhouse has two storeys and three bays, the right bay recessed, and an outshut, and the windows are horizontally-sliding sashes with keystones. The cowhouse has two bys and a loft, and contains a stable door and slit vents.
Park Farmhouse and farmbuilding 54.46805°N 1.07221°W		Late 18th century	The farmhouse and stable are in stone, with eaves bands, and pantile roofs with stone ridges, copings and kneelers. The house has two storeys and three bays, the right bay recessed, and a porch. The windows are horizontally-sliding sashes, those in the ground floor with keystones, and at the rear is a stair window. The stable has three bays and a loft on the left, and contains doorways, slit vents and a loft door.
Barn at Park Farm; 54.46770°N 1.07174°W		Late 18th century	The barn is in stone, with quoins, and a pantile roof with stone ridges, copings and kneelers. There are three bays, and to the south is an engine house with a semi-octagonal end and stone piers. The barn contains stable doors with quoined surrounds, and slit vents.
Barn/byre north of Warren Farmhouse; 54.47390°N 1.03948°W	—	Late 18th century	The building is in stone, with an eaves band, and a pantile roof with a stone ridge and coping. There are four bays, and it contains stable doors, slit vents, and a blocked loft opening with a bird hole above.
Cowhouse range with cartshed west of West House; 54.47585°N 1.02227°W	—	Late 18th century (probable)	A long range of farm buildings in stone, with a pantile roof and a stone ridge, coping and block kneelers. It contains stable doors, slit vents and a small window.
Bleach Mill Farmhouse and outbuilding 54.47549°N 1.08155°W		1778	The farmhouse, and the outbuilding, later incorporated in the house, are in stone, with an eaves band, and a pantile roof with stone ridges, copings and shaped kneelers. The house has two storeys and two bays. On the front is a porch and the windows are sashes with keystones, one dated. The former outbuilding, recessed on the right, has one storey, it contains quoins, and the openings include a stable door and an initialled slit vent.
Church House Farmhouse and Cottage; 54.47769°N 1.07017°W		c. 1780	The farmhouse and cottage are in stone with tile roofs and shaped kneelers. There are two storeys, a central block of three bays, and lower flanking two-bay wings, the left two bays forming the cottage. The middle bay of the centre block contains blind windows, and in the outer bays are tripartite windows. The two right bays have a doorway and sash windows, and in the left two bays are a porch and 20th-century windows. At the rear are two doorways, a stair window and other windows, all with keystones.
Lonsdale Farmhouse; 54.48910°N 1.06678°W	—	c. 1780	The farmhouse is in stone, with an eaves band, and pantile roofs with stone ridges, coping and shaped kneelers. There are two storeys, two bays, and a recessed single-storey bay on the right. The windows are horizontally-sliding sashes, most with keystones, and at the rear is a stair window with an inscribed lintel.
Kildale Hall; 54.47715°N 1.05992°W		c. 1780	A large house that was altered in 1827–32 by Anthony Salvin, it is in stone, with a Welsh slate roof and coped gablets. The entrance front has two storeys, an attic and four bays, and an eaves cornice. The left bay contains a French window, the bay to the right projects, and has a canted bay window with an iron balustraded balcony. In the next bay is a Doric distyle in antis portico and a pedimented gable with a dormer, and the right bay is recessed. The left return has five bays, the end bays projecting with pediments containing initials, and beyond this are further wings.
Warren Farmhouse; 54.47325°N 1.03922°W	—	1780	The farmhouse is in stone on a plinth, with an eaves band, and a pantile roof with a stone ridge, copings and shaped kneelers. There are two storeys and an attic, three bays, and an outshut. The windows in the garden front are tripartite, elsewhere there are sash windows, some horizontally-sliding, and the openings have keystones, one dated and initialled.
Privy south of Warren Farmhouse; 54.47304°N 1.03928°W		c. 1780	The privy is in stone, with quoins, and a pantile roof with stone copings. There are doorways with quoined surrounds on the west and north sides.
East Green Beck Farmhouse and outbuildings 54.47973°N 1.04472°W		1782	The building is in stone with some brick, quoins, eaves bands, and pantile roofs with stone ridges, coping and shaped kneelers. The house has two storeys and four bays, the left two bays lower. Most of the windows are horizontally-sliding sashes with keystones, there is a later casement window, and a stair window with a dated and initialled lintel. On the left and right are single-storey outbuildings.
Bridge over River Leven; 54.47993°N 1.04416°W	—	Early 19th century	The bridge carries a road over the River Leven, and consists of a single round arch. It has a hood mould, a band, a parapet with round-topped coping, and end piers with segmental tops.
Cowhouse and pigsty range, Park Farm; 54.46785°N 1.07201°W	—	Early 19th century	A long range of farm buildings in stone, with a pantile roof and a stone ridge and coping. It contains stable doors, other doors, and chutes to the former pigsties.
Barn, West House Farm; 54.47387°N 1.02228°W	—	Early 19th century	The barn is in stone on a plinth, with quoins, and a pantile roof with stone ridges, coping and block kneelers. There are six bays, and an engine house with a semi-octagonal end, stone columns and an obelisk roof finial, projects to the north. The barn openings, some blocked, include doorways, slit vents and pitching holes.
Loosebox southwest of West House; 54.47574°N 1.02213°W	—	Early 19th century (probable)	The loosebox is in stone, and has a pantile roof with a tile ridge, stone coping and block kneelers. It consists of a single cell, with a stable door, and slit vents in the left gable.
Cecilia Cottage; 54.47582°N 1.06424°W	—	1836	A school, later a house, in stone on a plinth, with an eaves band, and a Welsh slate roof with a stone ridge, coping, and a shaped kneeler on the left. There is a single storey and three bays, and on the front are sash windows with triangular soffits to the lintels. At the rear is a gabled porch with a Tudor arched window, and a shield above.
School House; 54.47577°N 1.06436°W	—	1836	A schoolmaster's house, later a private house, in stone on a plinth, with a Welsh slate roof, a stone ridge, coping and shaped kneelers. There is one storey and an attic, and two bays. In the left bay is a gabled porch, the doorway has a chamfered surround, rounded corners, and above it is a dated and initialled shield. The windows are sashes, those in the upper floor breaking through the eaves under gablets.
Chimney southeast of Warren Farmhouse; 54.47161°N 1.03728°W		Mid 19th century	The chimney of the former ironstone workings is in stone and red, yellow and brown brick, and has a square plan and tapering sides. It stands on a rusticated stone base with an oval panel and a cornice. The shaft is in red brick with yellow bands, and it has a cornice and an upswept stone cap.
St Cuthbert's Church; 54.47806°N 1.06892°W		1868	The church, designed by Fowler Jones, is in stone with Welsh slate roofs. It consists of a nave, a north aisle, a south porch, a chancel with a north vestry, and a west tower. The tower has two stages, corner buttresses, a southeast stair turret with a trefoil band and a spire with a polygonal turret and a grotesque finial, a two-light west window and slit windows, single-light bell openings, a dentilled eaves band with gargoyles, and a pyramidal roof with a weathervane.
