= Listed buildings in Foxholes, North Yorkshire =

Foxholes is a civil parish in the county of North Yorkshire, England. It contains three listed buildings that are recorded in the National Heritage List for England. Of these, one is listed at Grade II*, the middle of the three grades, and the others are at Grade II, the lowest grade. The parish contains the villages of Foxholes and Butterwick and the surrounding countryside, and the listed buildings consist of two churches and a farmhouse.

== Key ==
Grade	Criteria
II*	Particularly important buildings of more than special interest
II	Buildings of national importance and special interest

== Buildings ==
Name and location	Photograph	Date	Notes	Grade
St Nicholas' Church, Butterwick; 54.12975°N 0.48437°W		14th century	The church, which incorporates some 12th-century material, was restored and extended in 1882–83 by G. Fowler Jones. It is built in sandstone with some red brick, and has a slate roof. The church consists of a nave and a chancel in one unit, and a south porch, with a bellcote on the west gable. The bellcote is gabled and contains two round arched openings and has a cross finial. The porch has a Tudor arched doorway and a scalloped bargeboard.	II*
Glebe Farmhouse; 54.12767°N 0.48535°W		Early 18th century	The farmhouse has a cruck-framed core, it is encased in whitewashed chalk on brick footings, and has a pantile roof. There is a single storey and attics, and three bays. The windows have top-opening lights, and in the attic are three flat-roofed dormers. Inside, there are three pairs of upper crucks.	II
St Mary's Church, Foxholes; 54.14478°N 0.45554°W		1866	The church, designed by G. Fowler Jones in Neo-Norman style, is in sandstone with limestone dressings, some Mansfield stone, and a slate roof. It consists of a nave, a north aisle, an apsidal chancel, a vestry, and a southwest tower. The tower has four stages, string courses, lancet windows and roundels, and round-headed bell openings, above which is a scalloped cornice and a pyramidal roof with a weathercock. The porch is gabled, and contains a round arch with nailhead moulding, shafts with stiff-leaf capitals, an impost band and a hood mould.	II
