= Clifton Hospital =

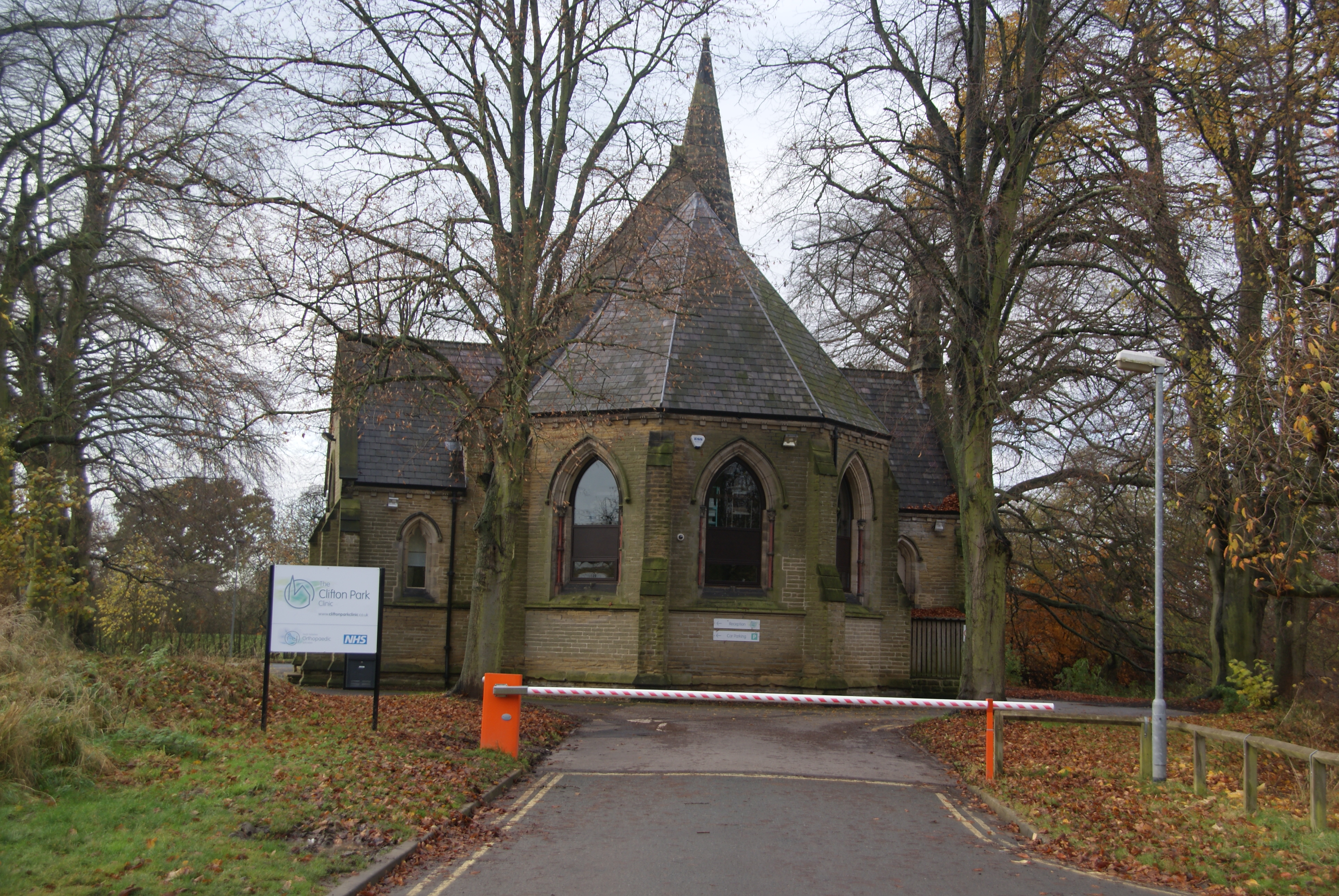
- The old chapel at Clifton Hospital

- Shown in North Yorkshire

Geography
- Location: Clifton, York, North Yorkshire, England
- Coordinates: 53.9756°N 1.1177°W

Organisation
- Care system: NHS
- Type: Specialist

Services
- Emergency department: N/A
- Speciality: Psychiatric Hospital

History
- Founded: 1847
- Closed: 1994

Links
- Lists: Hospitals in England

Clifton Hospital was a mental health facility in Clifton, York, England.

== History ==
The hospital, which was designed by George Gilbert Scott and William Bonython Moffatt using a Corridor Plan layout, opened as the North and East Ridings Pauper Lunatic Asylum in April 1847. The hospital was considerably extended in stages to designs developed by George Fowler Jones in the second half of the 19th century.

It became the North Riding Lunatic Asylum in 1865 and the North Riding Mental Hospital in 1920 before joining the National Health Service as Clifton Hospital in 1948.

After the introduction of Care in the Community in the early 1980s, the hospital went into a period of decline and closed in July 1994. The main building was demolished and the site was redeveloped in part as offices for Norwich Union and in part for residential use as "Clifton Park" but the original chapel survives. The Clifton Park NHS Treatment Centre was erected on the site in 2006.
