= Walker Iron Foundry =

Manufacturing company in York, England

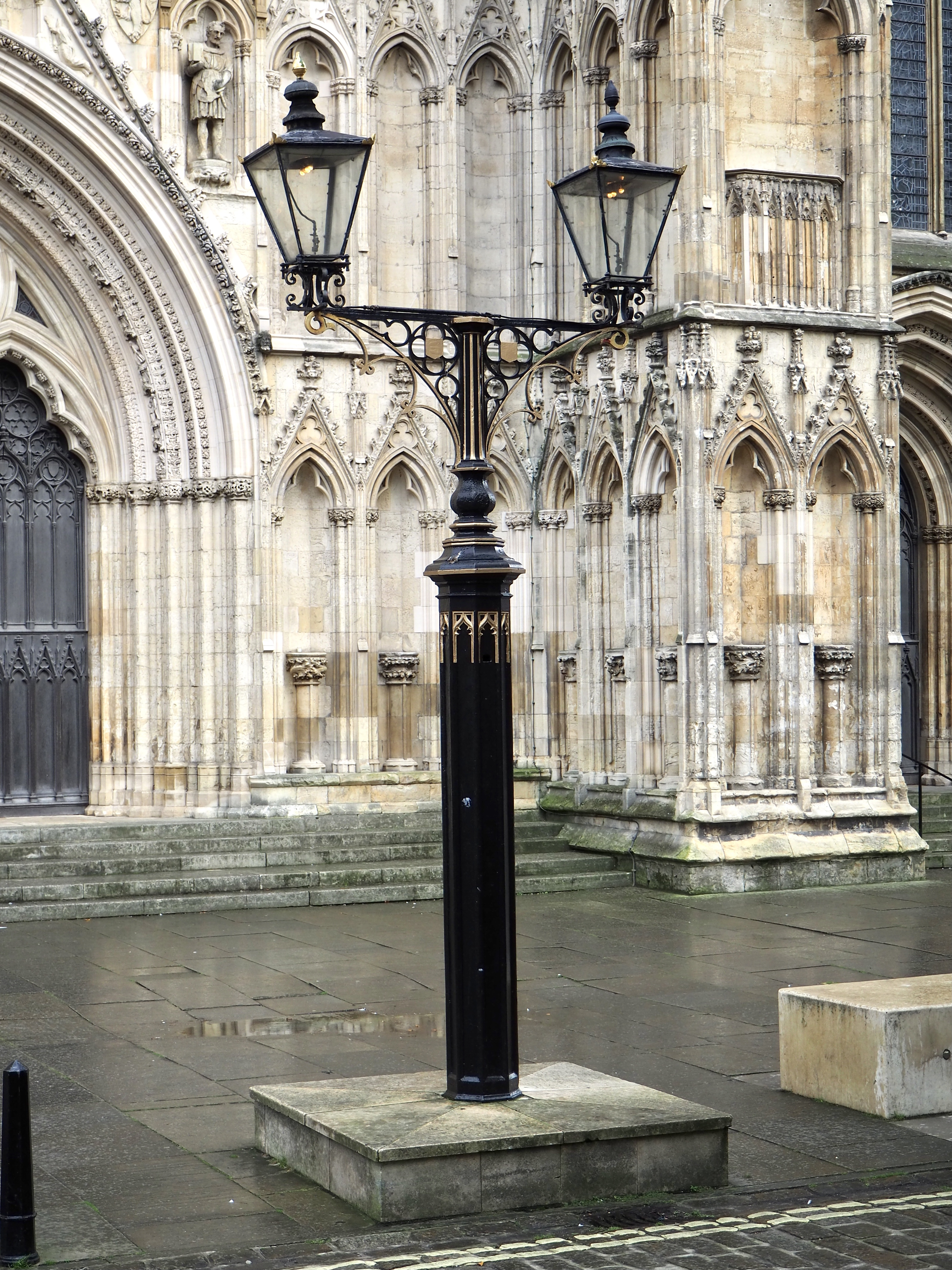
The Walker Iron Foundry created this listed lamp standard outside York Minster.

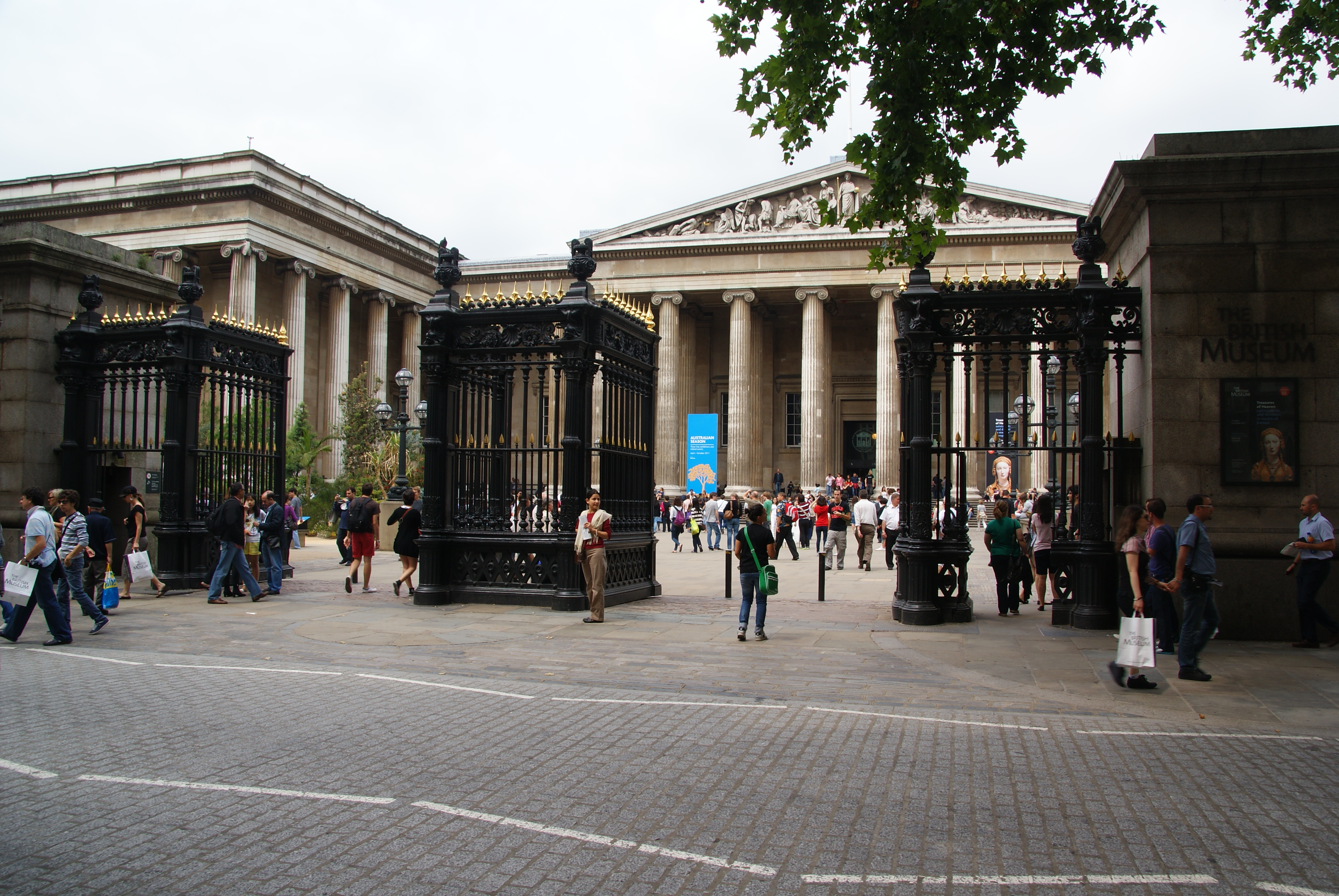
Front gates of the British Museum. Designed by Walker's firm in 1850.

The Walker Iron Foundry was founded in 1837 by John Walker of York (1801–23 June 1853) 'Iron & brass founder, bell-hanger & smith', at Dixon's Yard, Walmgate.

The son of William and Elizabeth Walker, of the Aldwark-Hungate area, John Walker began a seven year bound apprenticeship to Thomas & Joseph Gibson, Ironmongers of Pavement, York on 25 March 1815. Thomas died, and after completing his indentures, Walker stayed with the firm. In 1824 he became a Freeman of York and by 1829 he had become Gibson's partner. He must have been a very industrious young man, since by November 1837 he had bought out the Gibson foundry at 33 Walmgate and set up his own business.

In 1827 Walker married Jane Thomlinson of Whenby. The foundry site (53°57′27″N 1°04′31″W) on the banks of the River Foss, which facilitated water-borne transport, was originally silty land that had been reclaimed by a medieval dam and was a notoriously unsanitary slum. Five of the Walkers' seven children died, perhaps partly because of the unhealthy conditions, only one surviving beyond his 23rd year. Walker stood unsuccessfully as Conservative candidate for his local ward, but became a City Commissioner and a Churchwarden of St Denys Church, Walmgate. He 'for many years paid the expenses of instructing the men in his employment in singing, and by this means raised an efficient church choir'. [Yorks Gazette 2 July 1853]

Beginning locally, supplying the first gas lamps and railings for St Leonards Place, the firm prospered and in 1845–6 supplied the gates to Kew Gardens, London. This commission earned Walker the patronage of Queen Victoria in 1847 and he was granted permission to add "Ironfounders & Purveyors of Smithy Work to the Queen" to his letterheading. In 1850–53 his firm supplied the gates and railings to the British Museum, London. The gates were designed by Sydney Smirke and weighed 10 tons, according to the museum's records. They were originally opened by a windlass. Walker's tender of £6,786 contrasted with 2 London foundries' tenders of £7248 and £9050. Considering the additional substantial costs of transport from Yorkshire, it seems likely that Walker astutely took the opportunity to acquire kudos before profit. He also supplied the cast iron standard lamps in the museum forecourt, which were originally gas. According to a British History report, Walker achieved his success by submitting tenders far below those of his competitors. He supplied many large landowners with gates and railings, including Queen Victoria at Sandringham, Norfolk.

In 1843, following an accidental fire in 1840, Walker's supplied cast iron roof trusses for the South Nave of York Minster, which were erected by the York builder George Coates. Then in 1849 they supplied similar iron trusses for Castle Oliver, Limerick, Ireland to designs by the York architect George Fowler Jones.

By 1851 Walker's employed 52 men and according to the 1871 Census, 57 workmen & 5 boys. Measom's Illustrated Guide to the North Eastern Railway, 1861, says Walker's employed upwards of 100 workmen.

Upon his death in 1853, John was succeeded in what had by then become an extremely healthy business, by his son William (bapt. Whenby July 1828). On 28 April 1855 William married Sarah Thomas of King's Snaith, York and they lived away from the foundry, at Lawrence Street, then Clifton Grove. In the 1870s William adopted his mother's maiden name, becoming William Thomlinson Walker, later hyphenating the names. The firm were then Thomlinson-Walker Ltd, Iron Founders. In 1856 the Dixon's Yard premises were sold for £1,000 and the firm moved to 76 Walmgate, naming the new premises Victoria Foundry (53°57′27″N 1°04′29″W). The Bill of Sale for Dixon's Yard lists a sizeable Master's House; Smiths' Shops with Chambers; 2 large Warehouses, a large yard, Counting Houses, Stables, Cowshed, Piggeries, Hay & Harness Rooms, in all about 1,639 square yards (1,370 square metres). It seems logical that the new premises were substantially larger, or more favourably positioned. Business continued to improve during the 3rd quarter of the 19th century, and in 1886 Walker-Thomlinson Ltd bought adjacent premises at 78 & 80 Walmgate to develop as showrooms.

Walker's developed a healthy business exporting railings and gates to colonial and foreign governments, including the Botanical Gardens in Mauritius and the Maharajah Holkar of India.

Walkers exhibited at Yorkshire Agricultural Society Show in 1857 and at the Yorkshire Fine Art & Industrial Exhibition in 1866. York Castle Museum has a leather-bound edition of 'Design Book No.1 of Ironwork' manufactured by WM. Walker 365/41'.

William became active in local politics, becoming a Justice of the Peace, then in 1874, Sheriff of York. He became in 1854 a member of the Yorkshire Agricultural Society; was a prominent member of the York incorporated Sunday School Committee and also dedicated much time to his church. He apparently had a similar social conscience to his father and famously reduced his employees' working hours by half an hour on weekdays and an hour on Saturday. It isn't known at what hour work started in the mornings, but after the reduction they closed at 5.30 and on Saturday at 4.00. This gesture earned him the thanks of his men, who responded 'testifying to him their gratitude for this unsolicited concession' and allegedly his great astonishment and pleasure when they presented him with an engraved 'handsome silver inkstand, pen and pencil case, gold pen, letter seal and papier mache tray'.

His only son, John Richard Walker (bapt. 10 April 1856 at St Denys, Walmgate) assisted him in the business and upon William's death in 1911, his recently altered Will named his son as beneficiary of the company.

in 1886 John Richard Walker married Mary Louisa Esh. They had 4 sons, in 1887, 1888 1890 and 1900 and a daughter, Sarah in 1902. The 2nd son died in the First World War and the 4th son, Eddie (Herbert Edmund) moved with his sister Sarah Dorothy to Rhodesia. John Richard Walker does not appear to have been made of the same stuff as his father and grandfather. The firm floundered and John brought in fresh capital in the form of a Mr Birch, with whom he set up a new company at the same premises.

Walker's ceased trading shortly after John's death in 1923 and his widowed 2nd wife, Sarah Margaret Jemima lived thereafter in extreme poverty, in almshouses. The area where Walker's once flourished is now known as Foundry Square Gardens and is currently being redeveloped for residential use, having been an office block in the 1970s.

== Sources ==
Much of the information in this article is adapted from The York Historian Vol 1. 1976, kindly provided by York Museum.
