= St Cuthbert's Church, Kildale =

Church in Kildale, North Yorkshire, England

Coordinates: 54°28′41″N 1°04′08″W

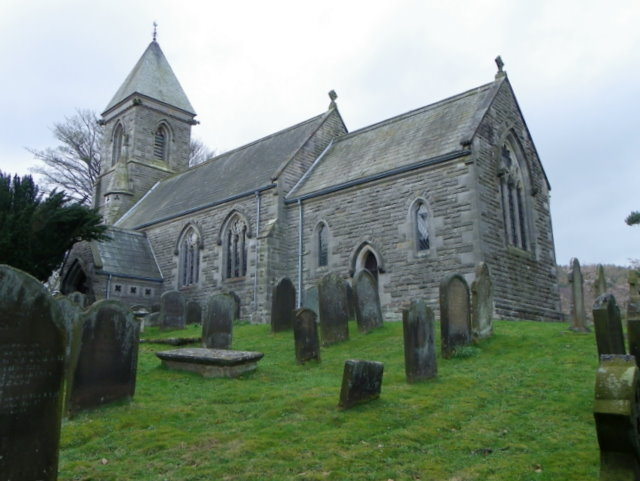
The church, in 2011

St Cuthbert's Church is the parish church of Kildale, a village in North Yorkshire, in England.

There was a church in Kildale in the mediaeval period. In 1848, it was described as "a very ancient structure, said to have been founded at an early period of the heptarchy", although it had been largely rebuilt in 1714. It was demolished and rebuilt in 1868, to a design by George Fowler Jones, in a 13th-century Gothic style. The building was grade II listed in 1966.

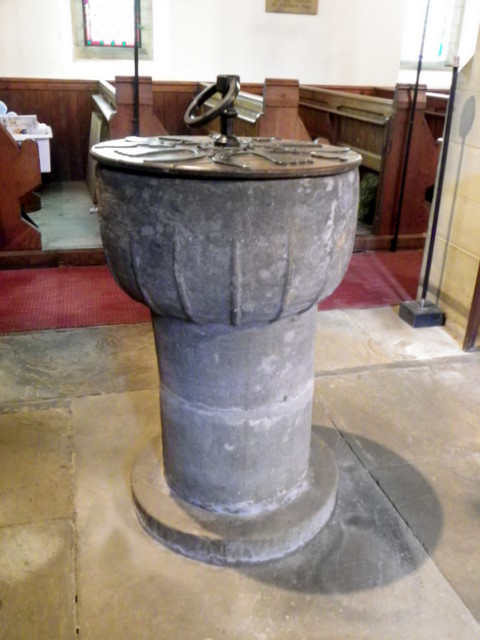
The 12th-century font

The church is built of stone with Welsh slate roofs. It consists of a nave, a north aisle, a south porch, a chancel with a north vestry, and a west tower. The tower has two stages, corner buttresses, a southeast stair turret with a trefoil band and a spire with a polygonal turret and a grotesque finial, a two-light west window and slit windows, single-light bell openings, a dentilled eaves band with gargoyles, and a pyramidal roof with a weathervane. Inside, there are two fonts, one probably 12th century and the other probably 16th century. There are four mediaeval grave covers in the porch, and the circular head of a mediaeval cross is at the west end. The east window has stained glass by Charles Eamer Kempe.

== See also ==
- Listed buildings in Kildale
