= St Philip and St James' Church, Clifton =

Listed church in York, England

St Philip and St James' Church
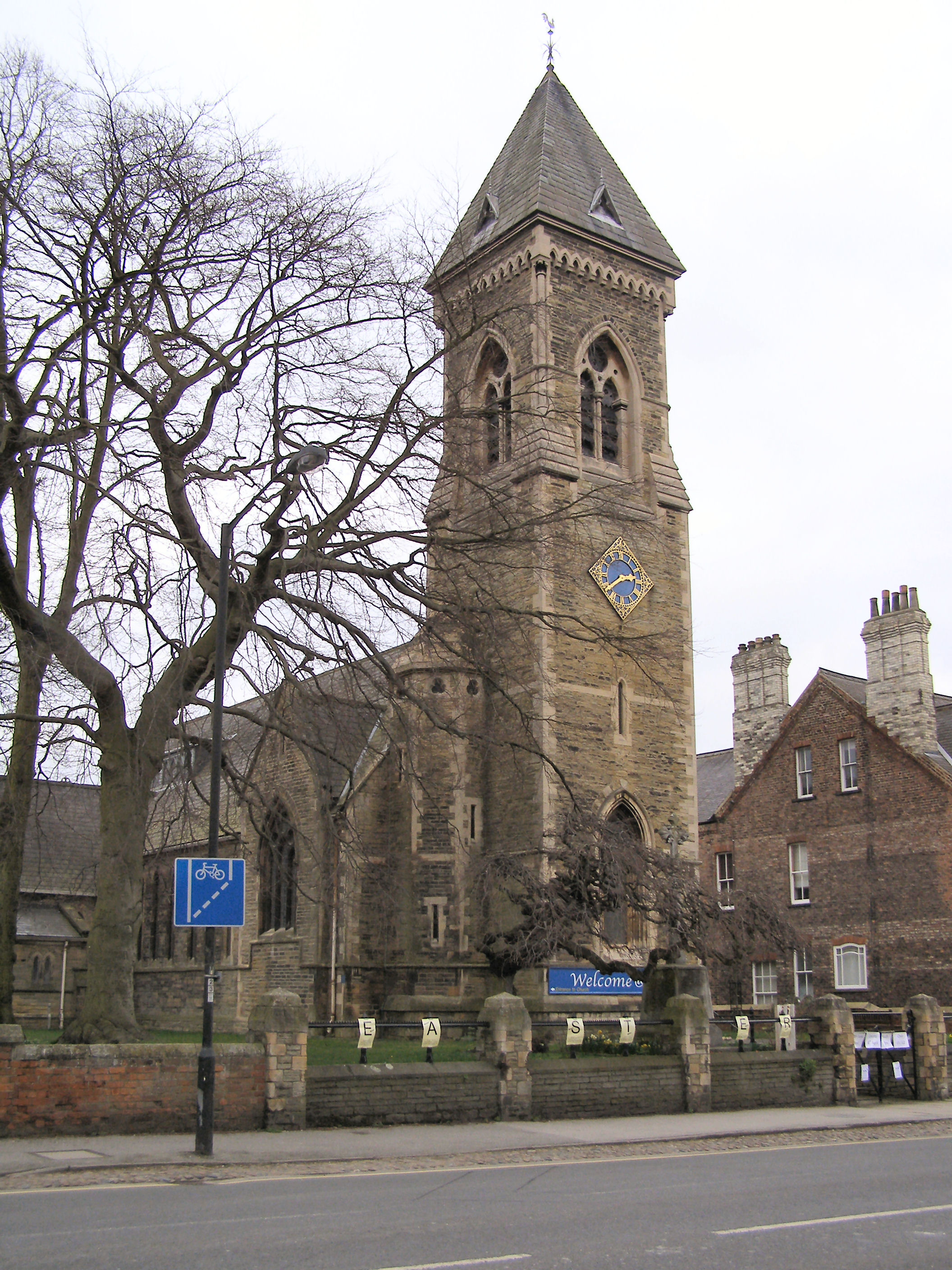
- The church, in 2010
- St Philip and St James' Church
- 53.97083°N 1.09728°W
- OS grid reference: SE 59309 53117
- Location: Clifton, York
- Country: England
- Denomination: Church of England
- Website: cliftonparish.org.uk

History
- Status: Active
- Consecrated: 1867

Architecture
- Heritage designation: Grade II listed
- Architect: George Fowler Jones
- Style: Gothic Revival
- Construction cost: £3,800

Specifications
- Materials: Stone

Administration
- Province: York
- Diocese: York
- Archdeaconry: York
- Deanery: York

St Philip and St James' Church is a parish church in Clifton, a suburb of inner northern York, England.

Until the mid-19th century, Clifton fell mostly within the parish of St Olave's Church, and also a detached part of the parish of St Michael le Belfrey. The heirs of Thomas de Grey, 2nd Earl de Grey donated a site by Clifton Green for the construction of a church. It was designed by George Fowler Jones, and was completed in 1867, at a cost of £3,800. It was given its own parish in 1871.

The church celebrated its centenary in 1967 by commissioning Kenneth Leighton to write a hymn, "O God, enfold me in the sun". Between 1984 and 1989, the church was reordered by Ronald Sims, who replaced the pews with chairs, and converted the chancel and transepts into meeting rooms. The building was Grade II listed in 1997. Nikolaus Pevsner was critical of the design, describing a "ponderous west tower", but praised the "excellent fittings in a plainer Pace style".

The church is in the Early English style, and is built of stone, with slate roofs, topped by a stone cross and finials. It comprises a five-bay nave, a two-bay chancel, north and south transepts, a west tower, and a south porch. On the north side is a half-hexagonal staircase turret, and a vestry. Most of the windows are lancets, some in groups of three, while the west window has a trefoil head. Many of the bays are divided by buttresses. The main entrance is on the north side and has 20th-century double doors. Inside there is a hammerbeam roof, with carved and gilded angels attached to the westernmost bay. The window in the north transept has stained glass by Clayton and Bell, while the east window of the south transept is by John Ward Knowles, and other windows have plain glass designed by Sims.

== See also ==
- Listed buildings in York (outside the city walls, northern part)
