= St Mary's Church, Foxholes =

Church building in Foxholes, North Yorkshire, England

Coordinates: 54°08′41″N 0°27′20″W

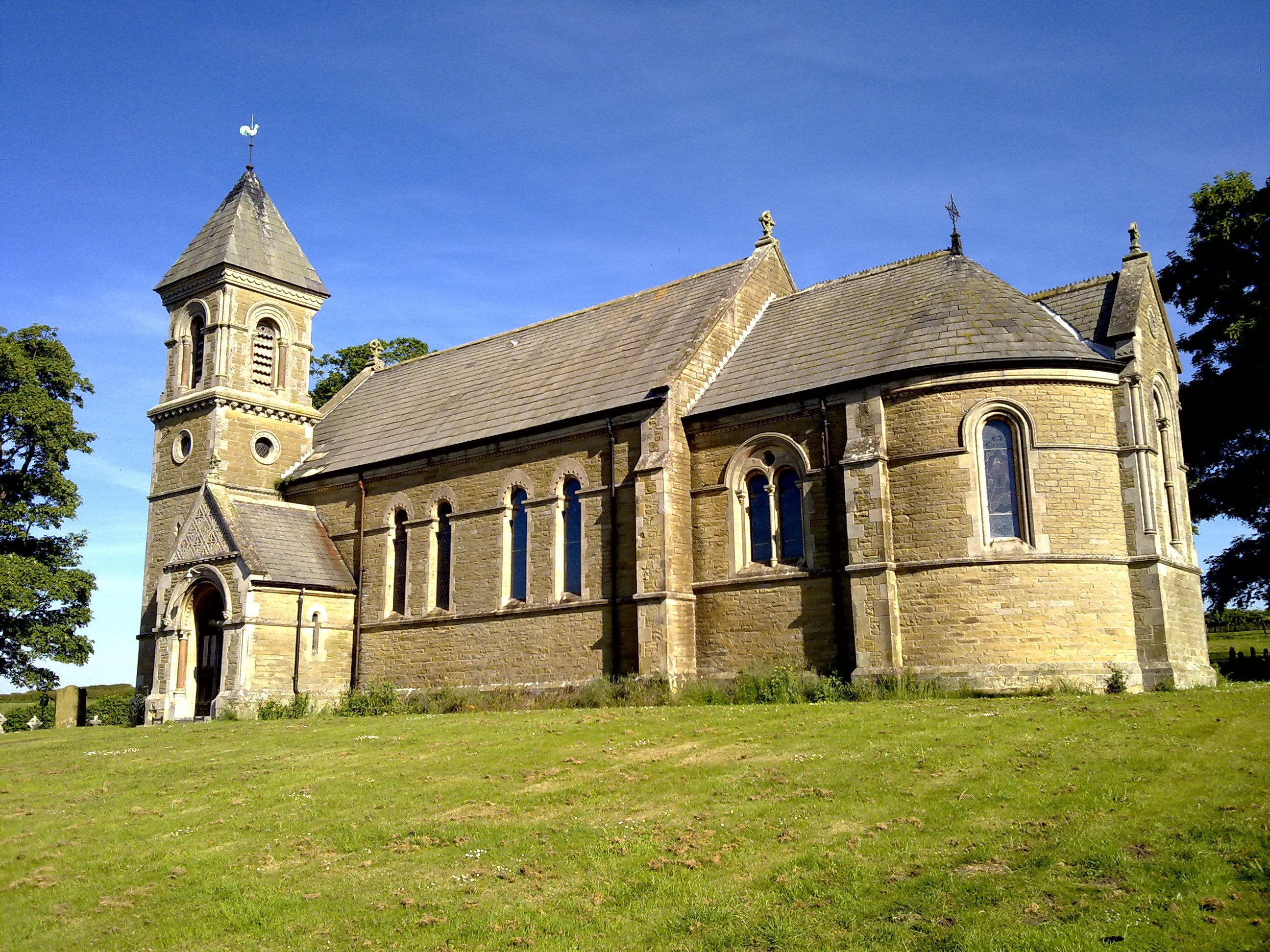
- St Mary's Church, Foxholes
- St Mary's Church, Foxholes
- OS grid reference: TA 00982 73208
- Location: Foxholes, North Yorkshire
- Country: England
- Denomination: Church of England

Architecture
- Designated: 10 October 1966
- Architect: George Fowler Jones
- Style: Neo-Norman

Specifications
- Materials: Chalk and sandstone with slate roof

Administration
- Diocese: York
- Archdeaconry: East Riding
- Benefice: Wolds Valley

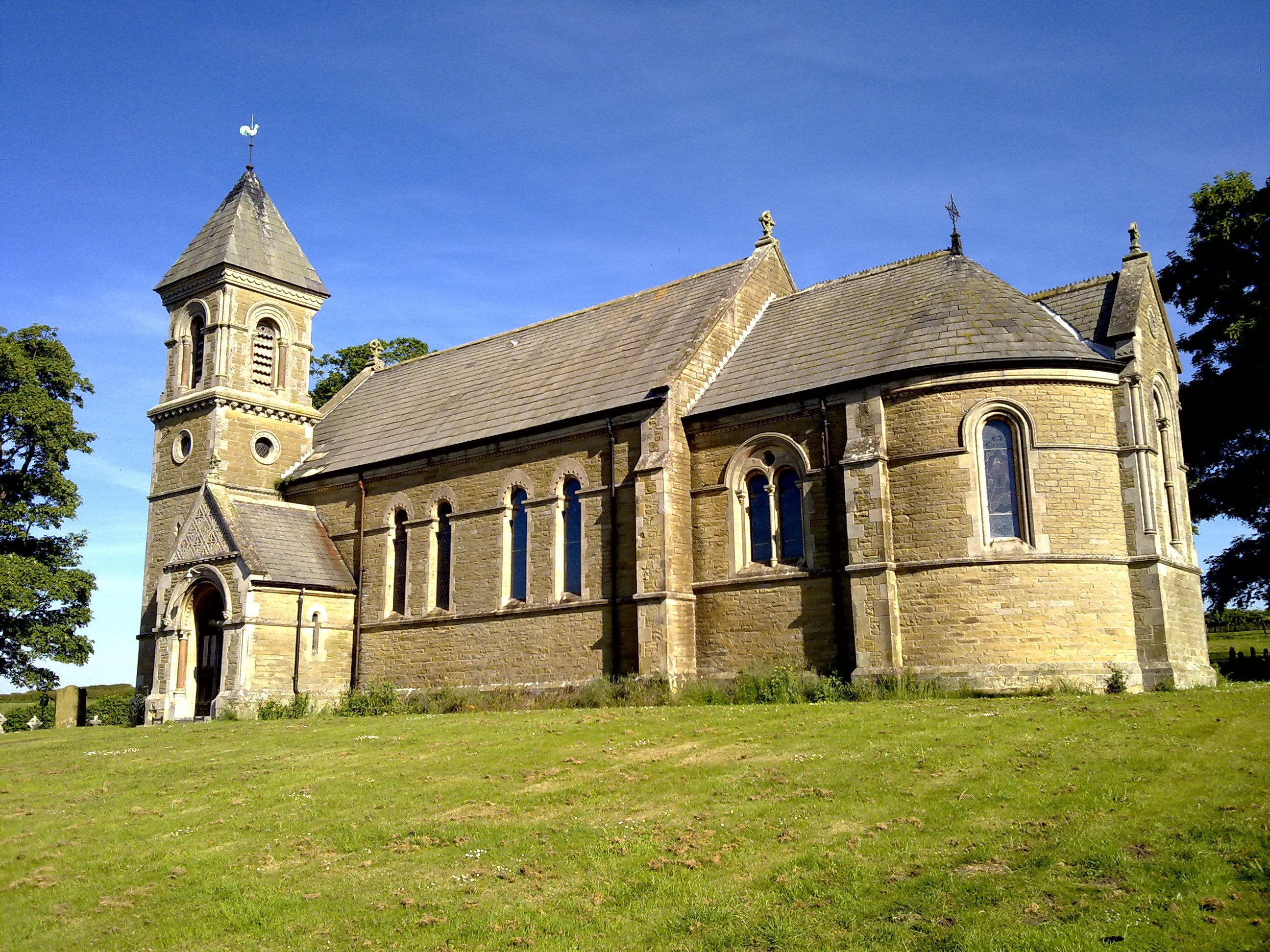
The church, in 2009

St Mary's Church is a closed Anglican church in Foxholes, North Yorkshire, a village in England.

A church was built in Foxholes in the Norman period. It was restored or rebuilt in about 1777. In 1848, it was described as "an ancient structure, consisting of a nave and chancel separated by a fine Norman arch". In 1866, the church was entirely rebuilt by George Fowler Jones, in the Neo-Norman style. It was grade II listed in 1966.

The church is built of sandstone with limestone dressings, some Mansfield stone, and a slate roof. It consists of a nave, a north aisle, an apsidal chancel, a vestry, and a southwest tower. The tower has four stages, string courses, lancet windows and roundels, and round-headed bell openings, above which is a scalloped cornice and a pyramidal roof with a weathercock. The porch is gabled, and contains a round arch with nailhead moulding, shafts with stiff-leaf capitals, an impost band and a hood mould. The stained glass in the windows of the apse was designed by Jean-Baptiste Capronnier.

== See also ==
- Listed buildings in Foxholes, North Yorkshire
