= Foxholes, North Yorkshire =

Village in North Yorkshire, England

Coordinates: 54°08′36″N 0°27′08″W

Foxholes
- Location within North Yorkshire
- Population: 249 (2011 census)
- OS grid reference: TA011723
- Civil parish: Foxholes
- Unitary authority: North Yorkshire
- Ceremonial county: North Yorkshire
- Region: Yorkshire and the Humber
- Country: England
- Sovereign state: United Kingdom
- Post town: DRIFFIELD
- Postcode district: YO25
- Police: North Yorkshire
- Fire: North Yorkshire
- Ambulance: Yorkshire
- UK Parliament: Thirsk and Malton

Foxholes is a village in North Yorkshire, England, part of the civil parish of Foxholes with Butterwick. It lies where the B1249 road crosses the Great Wold Valley, 9 miles (14.5 km) south from Scarborough, 11 miles (17.7 km) north-west from Bridlington, and 7 miles (11.3 km) north-east from Sledmere. The course of the winterbourne stream the Gypsey Race passes to the south of the village.

Until 1974, the village lay in the historic county boundaries of the East Riding of Yorkshire. From 1974 to 2023 it was part of the Ryedale district.

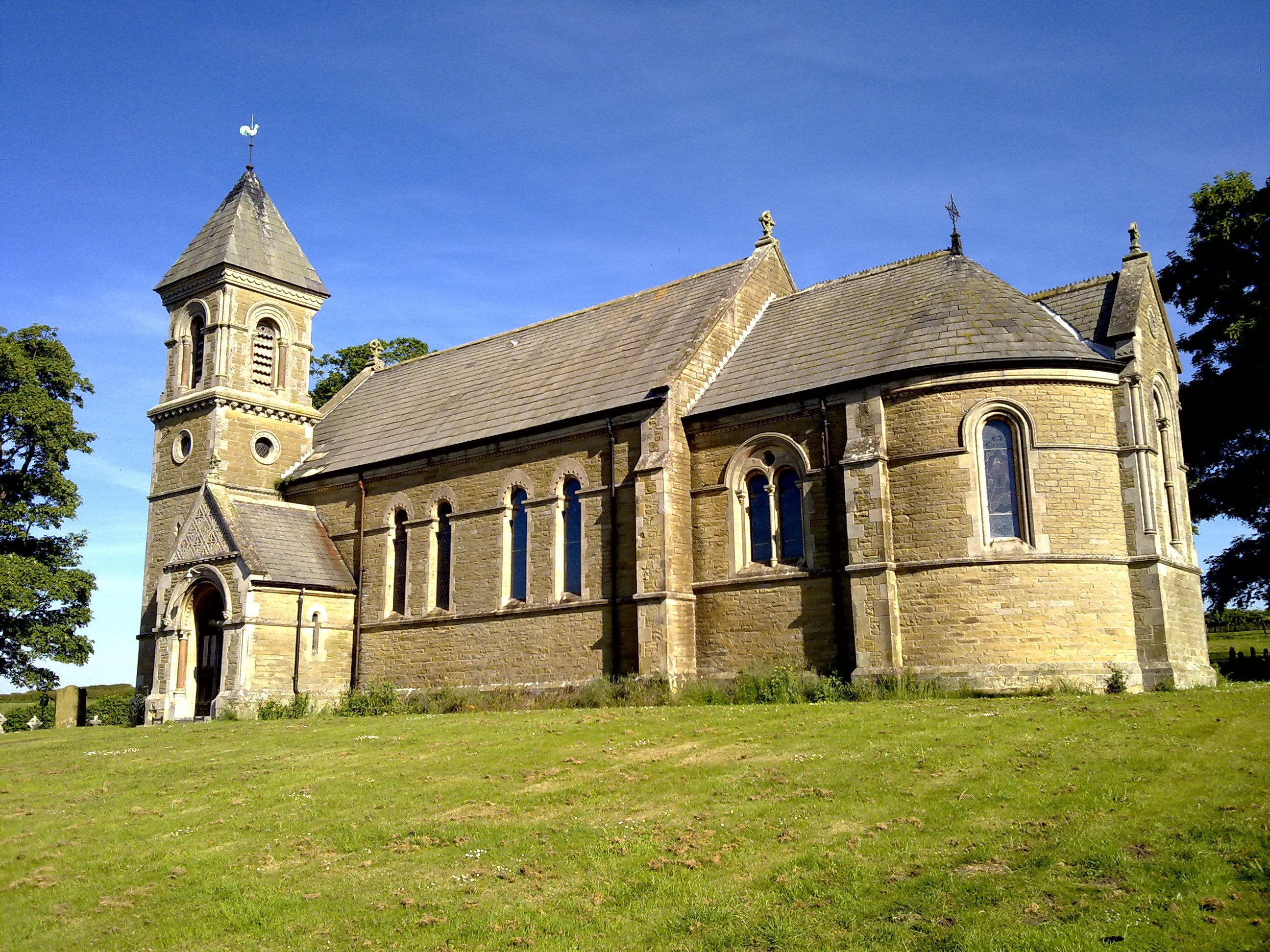
St Mary's Church, Foxholes

St Mary's Church, Foxholes is a Grade II listed former Anglican church, an 1866 limestone and sandstone construction by George Fowler Jones Pevsner describes this neo-Norman church as: "one of the ugliest in the Riding... The north aisle piers are grotesque, with their undersized shafts on their over-high bases and their big square foliage capitals... FONT. Obtrusively Norman". He also notes several windows by Capronnier, and a 1720 cup by William Gamble.

== See also ==
- Listed buildings in Foxholes, North Yorkshire
