= The Old Manor House, Clifton =

Listed building in York, England

The Old Manor House
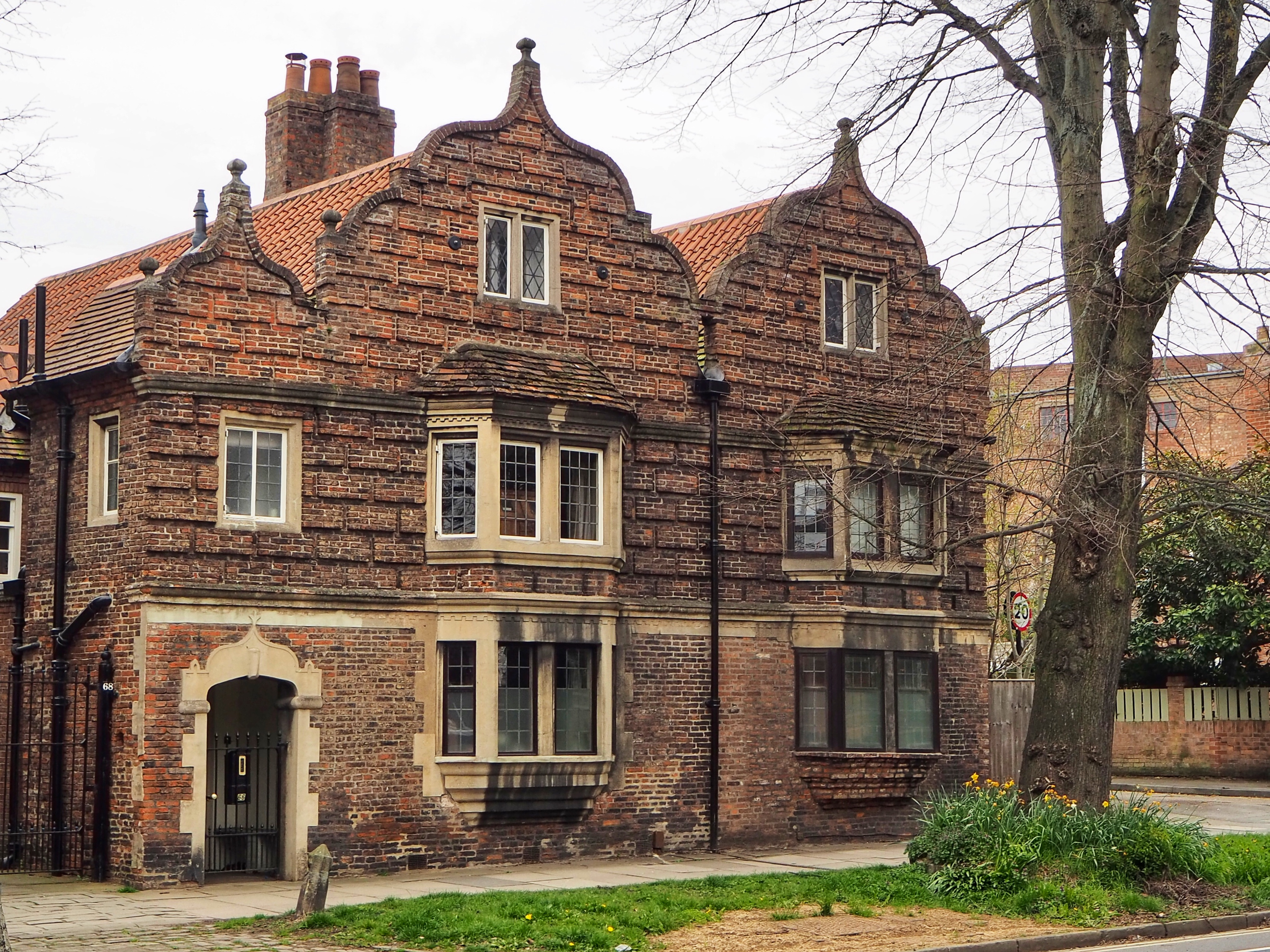
- The building in 2023
- Interactive map of the The Old Manor House area
- Alternative names: Nell Gywnne's House, 64 and 66 Clifton

General information
- Architectural style: Artisan Mannerist
- Location: Clifton, York, England
- Coordinates: 53°58′05″N 1°05′39″W
- Completed: Late 17th century (with 16th-century remains)
- Renovated: 1962 (restored)

Technical details
- Floor count: 2 + attic

Design and construction
- Designations

Listed Building – Grade II*
- Official name: 64 and 66, Clifton
- Designated: 14 June 1954
- Reference no.: 1259226

The Old Manor House, also known as Nell Gywnne's House, is a historic building in the Clifton area of York, England.

Two timber-framed tenement buildings, each of two storeys, were built on the site at some point between the 14th and 16th centuries. In the late 17th century, it was largely rebuilt in brick, in the Artisan Mannerist style. The rebuilding may have been due to damage during the Siege of York. A local legend claims that, when Charles II visited York, Nell Gwynne stayed in the house.

By the 19th century, the building housed working-class families in rooms which had been subdivided. At the start of the 20th century, the eastern part of the building was a tobacconist and barbers shop. In the 1930s, the building was converted into a single house, and the roof was entirely replaced. The house was Grade II* listed in 1954. In 1962, it was restored and partly rebuilt, the new work include the south-east wall and the window openings in the rear wall. The York Civic Trust purchased the building in 1985, but sold it as a private house in the early 21st century. In 2020, the house was placed on the market for £1.29 million.

The building has two storeys, with an attic above. There are two main gables on the front to the street named Clifton, and to their left, a smaller gable over the porch. Above ground floor level, the brickwork has been laid in an approximation of larger stone blocks.

Inside the building, most of the ceiling beams and joists are 16th-century. The chimney is in the centre of the building, and it has 17th-century fireplaces. The entrance door is also 17th-century, but has been moved from its original doorway. One room has an 18th-century fitted cupboard. There is a cellar under part of the house, reached down a 17th-century flight of stairs.

== See also ==
- Grade II* listed buildings in the City of York
- Listed buildings in York (outside the city walls, northern part)
