= Oliver Gascoigne =

The Oliver Gascoigne family originated at the point that Richard Oliver, originally of Castle Oliver, Limerick, Ireland, inherited the fortune of Sir Thomas Gascoigne of Parlington Hall, Yorkshire, in 1810. Sir Thomas made it a stipulation of his will that Richard add 'Gascoigne' to his name. Richard had married Sir Thomas's stepdaughter, Mary Turner, in 1804. Richard and Mary had two daughters, Isabella and Elizabeth, who inherited their parents' fortune in 1843. The sisters demolished their ancestral home in Ireland, and built a new Castle Oliver a few hundred yards to the north east. The castle still exists.

== See also ==
- Gascoigne baronets
- Frederic Trench, 2nd Baron Ashtown

== References and sources ==
- Castle Oliver & the Oliver Gascoignes by Nicholas Browne
