= Butterwick, Foxholes =

Village in North Yorkshire, England

Coordinates: 54°07′42″N 0°29′08″W

Butterwick
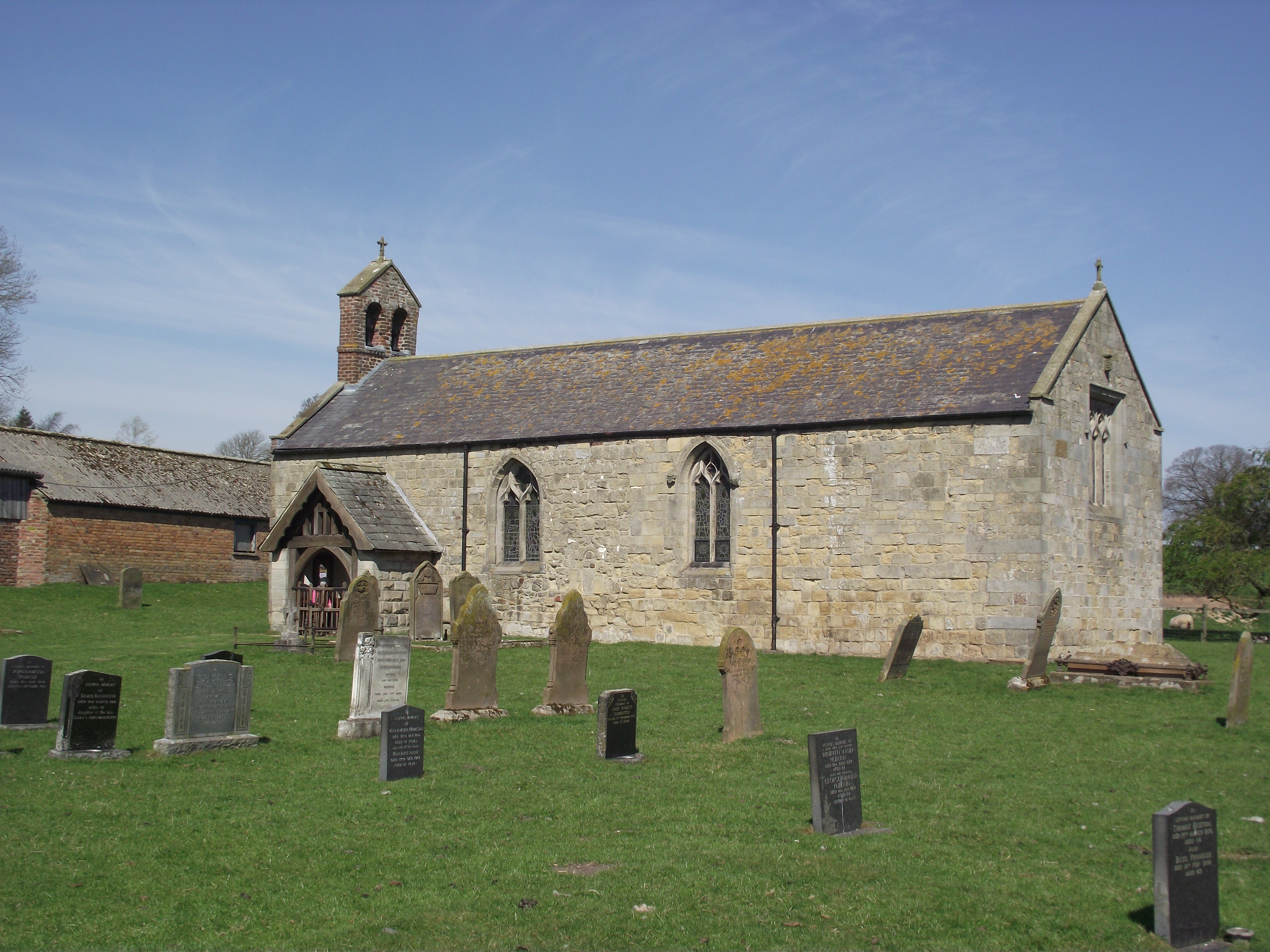

- Location within North Yorkshire
- OS grid reference: SE991712
- Civil parish: Foxholes
- Unitary authority: North Yorkshire
- Ceremonial county: North Yorkshire
- Region: Yorkshire and the Humber
- Country: England
- Sovereign state: United Kingdom
- Post town: MALTON
- Postcode district: YO17
- Police: North Yorkshire
- Fire: North Yorkshire
- Ambulance: Yorkshire
- UK Parliament: Thirsk and Malton

Butterwick is a village and former civil parish, now in the parish of Foxholes (1.75 miles (2.8 km) to the east, near the village of Weaverthorpe (2 miles (3.2 km) to the west), in North Yorkshire, England. The village lies in the Great Wold Valley and the course of the winterbourne stream the Gypsey Race passes through it. Until 1974 the village lay in the historic county boundaries of the East Riding of Yorkshire. It was part of the Ryedale district between 1974 and 2023. It is now administered by North Yorkshire Council.

== History ==
The name "Butterwick" means 'Butter specialised-farm'. The settlement is listed in the Domesday Book as being in the hundred of Burton, later being designated as the wapentake of Dickering. At the time of the Domesday survey, the area belonged to Count Mortain, and it 12 carucates of land. Butterwick was formerly a township in the parish of Foxholes, from 1866 Butterwick was a civil parish in its own right until it was abolished to create Foxholes parish on 1 April 1935.

In 1931 the parish had a population of 77.

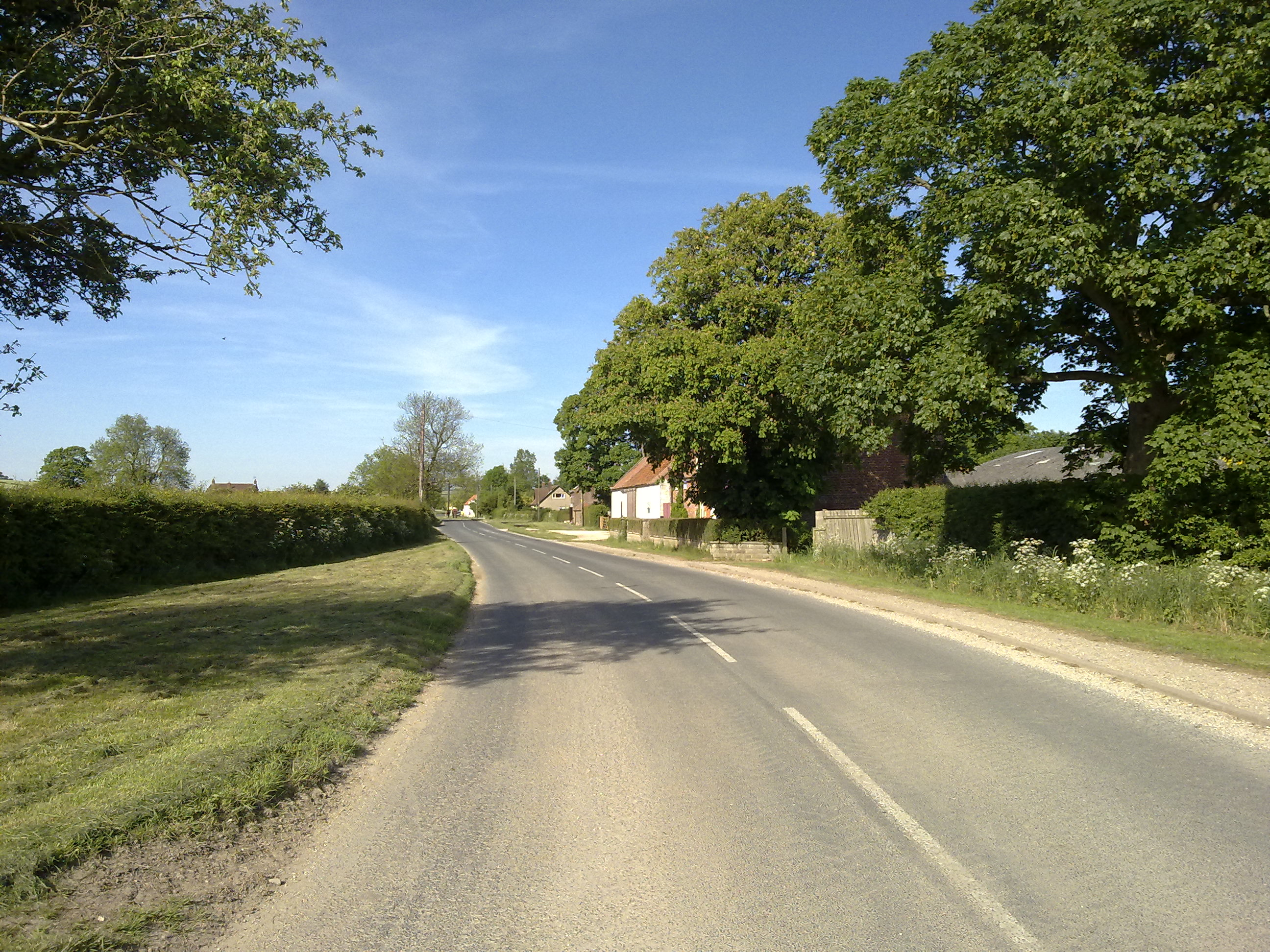
Main street through Butterwick

Butterwick is a small village and only contains about 13 to 15 houses. It has a church dedicated to St Nicholas, and several farming families. The church was originally a chapel, which belonged to the church at Foxholes, although Butterwick itself was made into its own parish in 1858. St Nicholas' Church, Butterwick is a grade II* listed building, which was renovated in 1882, although parts date back to the 12th century. The closest school is Weaverthorpe Primary, about 1 mile (1.6 km) away. It is approximately 0.5 miles (0.8 km) west of Foxholes, 9 miles (14 km) from Driffield, 13 miles (21 km) from Bridlington, 15 miles (24 km) from Scarborough and 35 miles (56 km) from York.

The Gypsey Race watercourse flows through the village, though in summer, it is mostly below the surface. It was known as the Lord's Beck in the 16th century, and then the Lord's River in the 18th and 19th centuries.

== See also ==
- Listed buildings in Foxholes, North Yorkshire
