= George Fowler Jones =

British architect (1818–1905)

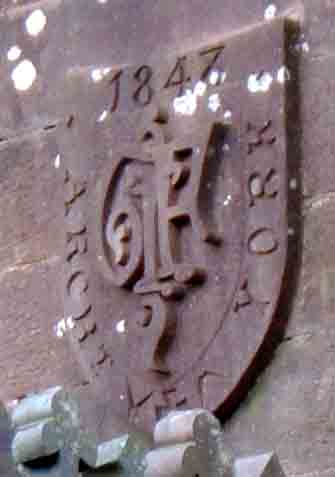
Fowler Jones' monogram on gable end, Castle Oliver, Ireland

George Fowler Jones (25 January 1818 – 1 March 1905) was an architect and early amateur photographer who was born in Scotland but based for most of his working life in York.

== Biography and work ==
Jones was born in Inverness in 1818. He studied under architect William Wilkins, the designer of Yorkshire Museum and the National Gallery, assisting him with the plates for his work on Vitruvius; then in around 1839 in London under Sir Sydney Smirke. When Smirke undertook repairs to the fire-damaged York Minster in the early 1840s, including revolutionary iron roof trusses, he sent Jones to take measurements. Jones liked York enough to move there shortly after. A few years later Jones designed similar iron roof trusses for one of his early commissions, Castle Oliver in Ireland. Jones was elected Fellow of the Royal Institute of British Architects (FRIBA) on 17 February 1868, proposed by Decimus Burton, Sydney Smirke and Ewan Christian.

He married firstly Anne, in 1848, the 3rd daughter of Dr William Matterson of Minster Yard, York, (Lord Mayor). She died 'of congestion of the lungs' on 29 January 1855 aged 35 at home, Bootham. Then Catherine, in 1857, 4th daughter of Henry Pigeon Esq. of Clapham Common and Southwark. Jones fathered 11 children who survived into their majority. With his 1st wife: Gascoigne Hastings 1850–1911; Fowler Lloyd 1851–1929, settled in Hastings, UK; Augusta 1853–1935; Annie Eliza Elena 1855–1925. With his 2nd wife: Fanny Katherine 1858–1936; Constance 1860–1930; Harry Mckenzie 1861–1948 (moved to Valparaiso, Chile, descendants now in Santiago; Montague 1864–1935; Robert Colquhoun 1865–1952; Edith 1867–1946; Lucy 1870–1914. Further information welcome, follow Castle Oliver link (see below) and use the Contact form.

His earliest known commission, in 1843 at the age of 25, was the Gascoigne Almshouses, in Aberford, near Leeds, Yorkshire for the sisters Elizabeth & Mary Isabella Oliver Gascoigne. The building stood near the Gascoignes' family seat, Parlington Hall. Jones was also responsible for projects at Parlington Hall, including a conservatory and a boat house. He undertook commissions for the sisters throughout his life.

In 1843 when he began the Aberford Almshouses, Jones lived at 80 Baker Street, London. In 1844 while designing Castle Oliver he lived at 51 or 52 Monkgate, near Monk Bridge, York. In 1846 he started a practice at 8 Lendal, York. Plans and elevations of 3 Counties Asylum, dated 15 September 1856 give Jones' address as 4 New Street, York. The Yorkshire Gazette of 15 February 1862 records that Jones moved from New Street to 84 Bootham. Pevsner records that in 1862, Jones designed and built 78 Bootham, York, as his own residence and Jones' RIBA incorporation certificate of 1868 gives this as his address. Presumably therefore 78 Bootham became Jones' offices; Works at 3 Counties Asylum dated 8 July and September 1870 also give 84 Bootham. Plans for 3 Counties Asylum dated 3 May 1877 and 9 March 1878 give his address as 3 Stonegate, York. Further works at 3 Counties dated February 1880 give his address as 100 Micklegate, next to 'The Pack Horse' and he still held the property in 1886. However, since by this time Jones had in all probability retired to Malton, the address is probably that of his practice, then run by his son.

In addition to his architectural activities, Jones was a photographer in the very earliest days of the medium. He became a pupil to William Fox Talbot, inventor of the negative/positive process. Some of Jones' photographs of his own buildings and of York city, the earliest dating back to 1851, are to be found in the City of York Libraries and Archives; others at the City Reference Library, Leeds. A vast body of his photographic work, dating from the very earliest days of photography, now resides at the National Media Museum, Bradford. 2,100 negatives, along with some prints, have been catalogued in a 340-page index. Scenes include some of his earliest commissions, at Castle Oliver, Parlington Hall, Garforth Church and Aberford Almshouses. The collection spans Jones' entire career and includes images shot in Scotland, Ireland, Corsica, Belgium, Norway, Sweden and New Zealand. Within the collection are several large negatives which Jones' records as being Fox Talbot's work, although this has been disputed by Larry Schaaf, author and expert on Fox Talbot.

Jones was also a proficient watercolorist, exhibiting at the Fine Art Exhibitions of 1880 (St Mary's Abbey) and 1885 (two views of Norway & the Church of St John, Exmouth), probably other years also. An auction in 1923 at Castle Oliver, in Ireland included 2 Views of Corsica by G.Fowler Jones and his son bequeathed another, Ajaccio Bay, Corsica.

Jones contributed to Productions of the Leeds Photographic Society (1852), a book of photography by York residents.

He died at home, Quarry Bank, Malton, North Yorkshire. Obituaries in The Builder Journal and 'RIBA' Journal, are both dated 11 March 1905. An obituary appeared in the Yorkshire Herald on 3 March 1905 and in The Yorkshire Gazette of 4 March 1905. This latter says -on Wednesday, after a short illness, at the age of 85 years. He had lived at Malton for many years, but worked in York.

== Apprentices and assistants ==
- Edward Taylor, later 'Architect, of 7 Stonegate, York', served his articles with Jones (Jones' obituary Yorks Herald 3 March 1905). Designed York Art Gallery
- Mr Tomlinson
- John Ward Knowles (about 1845) 'As a youth worked 3–4 months for Jones at Monkgate, but disliked the work and returned to painting and glass staining'.
- Peter Kerr, Assistant (1843–1845), who later worked on additions to Dunrobin Castle, Sutherland and was in the office of Sir Charles Barry before emigrating to Australia in 1852
- James Rawson Carroll, Apprentice then Assistant (before 1845–1855). His brother Thomas built the stonework of Castle Oliver, Fowler Jones's largest private residential commission.
- John Russell Mackenzie, Assistant (before 1850).
- Horatio Kelson Bromhead, Assistant (c.1858–1859).
- William Bellerby of Clifton, near York. On leaving school was articled as a pupil to Jones, dates unknown but presumably commencing around1868. Completed training, but never practised, choosing to return to the family building co. In 1870 and 1877 Bellerby's family firm carried out work to Jones' designs: (see below, Fairfield Hospital).
- William Gilmour Wilson, Assistant (after 1877)
- Gascoigne Hastings Fowler Jones, Jones' eldest child, born 1850, named in honour of his father's early patrons, also became an architect. Gascoigne was apprenticed to his father's practice between 1867 and 1872, becoming Assistant Architect to his father from 1872 to 1876. In 1892–4 he repaired and restored St Mary's Church, Kippax, a Grade I Listed Building. During and after work at Kippax he arbitrated in a dispute between the contractor, Mr Keswick of Micklegate, York and the Rev'd. Hoste. Mr Keswick had submitted a very low tender, failing to foresee essential works. Gascoigne was sympathetic to the builder, who was elderly and in very poor health, drawing up a Statement of Cost to convince Hoste of Keswick's argument. This statement survives among the Parish Papers, West Yorkshire Archive Service. He is known to have designed Chestnut House, The Mount. Gascoigne took over almost all Jones' practice's works at Clifton Hospital in about 1889 (see below). The Dictionary of Scottish Architects suggests that he eventually operated his own practice, from 8 Lendal, York, the property where his father first practised. Gascoigne also had political aspirations: in 1901 he was 'Re-elected unopposed Conservative Councillor to Micklegate Ward' (Yorks Gazette 26 October 1901); again 'Re-elected unopposed' (Yorks Gazette 30 January 1904 and at least a 3rd time (Yorks Gazette 5/11/1910). He died aged 61 on 16 April 1911, (obituary Yorks Gazette 22 April 1911). He 'bequeathed pictures', including works by himself and his father, as well as a watercolour of Jones' first father-in-law, Lord Mayor Dr Matterson, to York Corporation (Yorks Gazette 29 July 1911). In 1878 he published 50 lithographs Sketches in York, at a cost of 3 sh/6d (York Central Library ref 942.843). The book's cover gives his address as 3 Stonegate, York.

One account in The Yorks Gazette mentions that Jones was assisted in his practice 'by both sons' and that following Gascoigne Jones' death 'his younger brother carried on the practice, taking on as partner a Mr Munby, but the firm ceased after probably a year or two'. It is not known which son this refers to.

== List of works ==
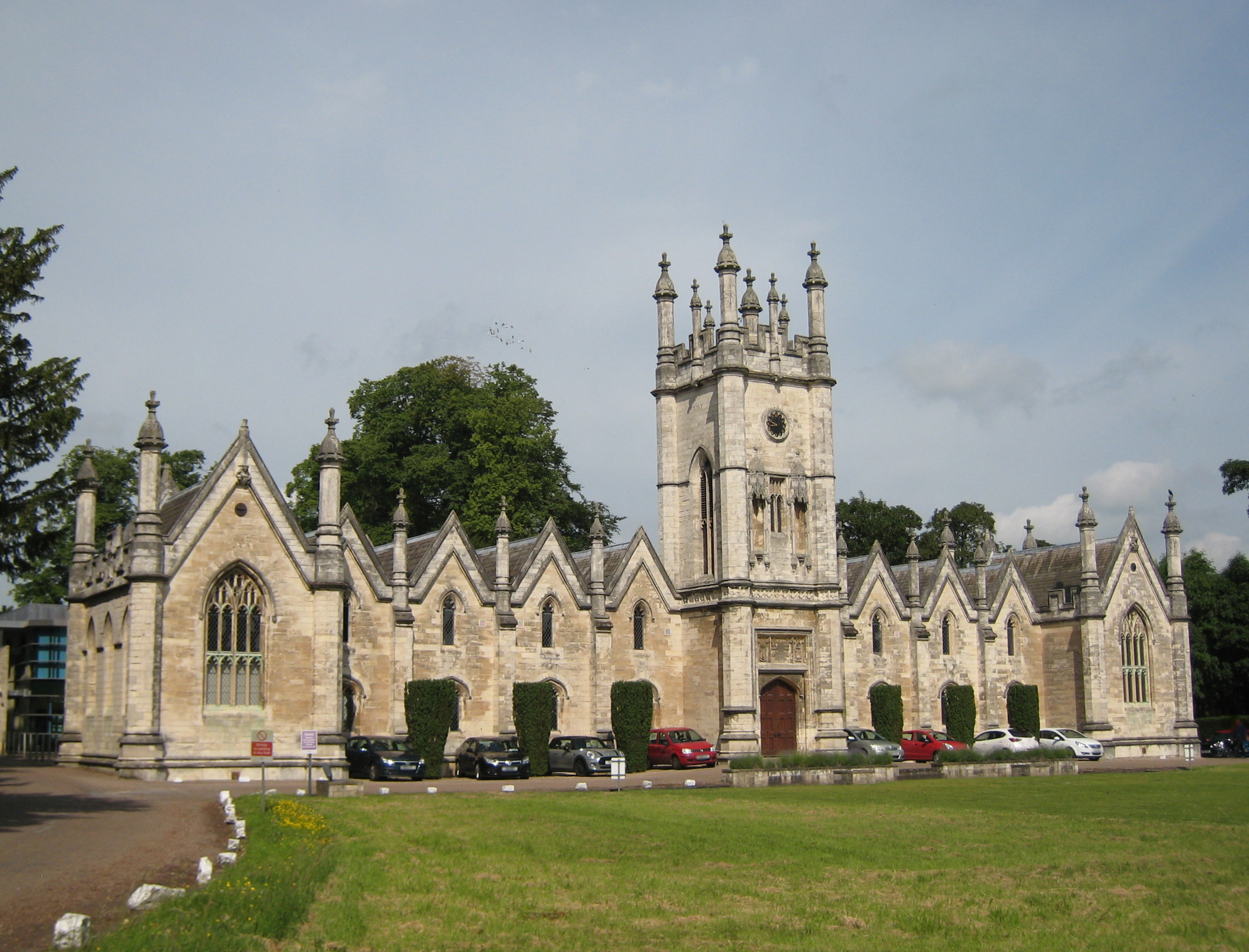
Gascoigne Almshouses

- Aberford, Yorkshire (West Riding): Gascoigne Almshouses and Gate Lodge (1843–44), Perpendicular Gothic; Commissioned by the Oliver Gascoigne sisters. Extensive use of Minton tiles hand-designed by the sisters.

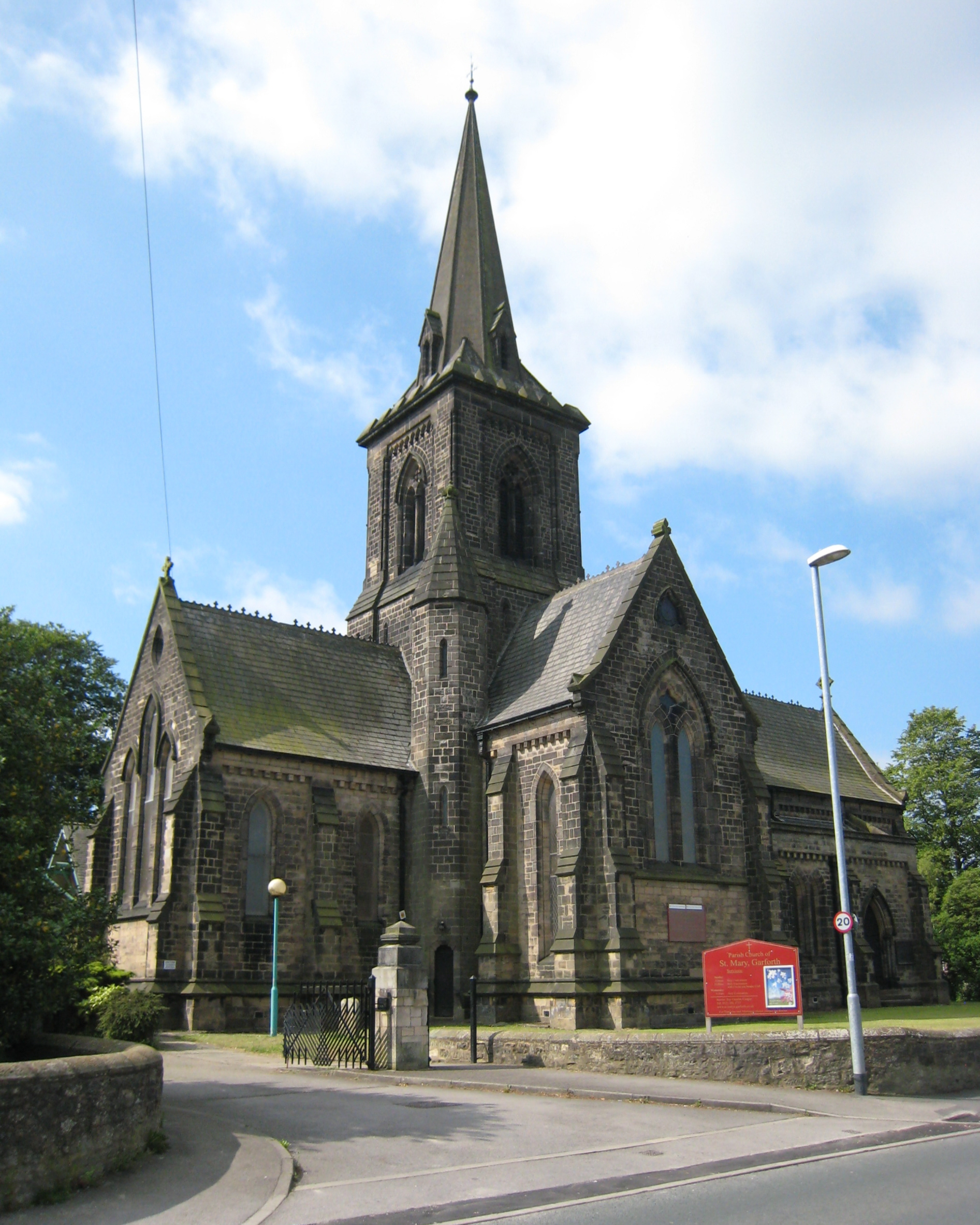
St Mary's, Garforth

- Garforth, Leeds, Yorkshire (West Riding): Church of St Mary (1844–45) Early Gothic; also commissioned by the Oliver Gascoigne sisters, who made the spectacular stained glass East Window. The foundation stone was laid on 22 July 1844; Consecrated 14 November 1845.
- Nairn, Nairnshire, Scotland: St Ninian's Church (1844). In 1901–3, the church was demolished and re-erected in Lochinver, Sutherland; it is now known as Lochinver Parish Church.
- Kilravock Castle, near Nairn, Morayshire, Scotland: east lodge (1844–45)
- Castle Grant, near Grantown-on-Spey, Morayshire, Scotland: west lodge (1845)
- Sherburn-in-Elmet, now South Milford: Church of St Mary (1845-Consecrated 26 November 1846) also commissioned by the Oliver Gascoigne sisters at a cost of £1,500. It was built of Huddleston limestone by Benjamin Bulmer of Thorpe Arch. The Gascoigne sisters also made stained glass windows for this church. Jones' designs for St Mary's were exhibited at the Royal Academy, London.

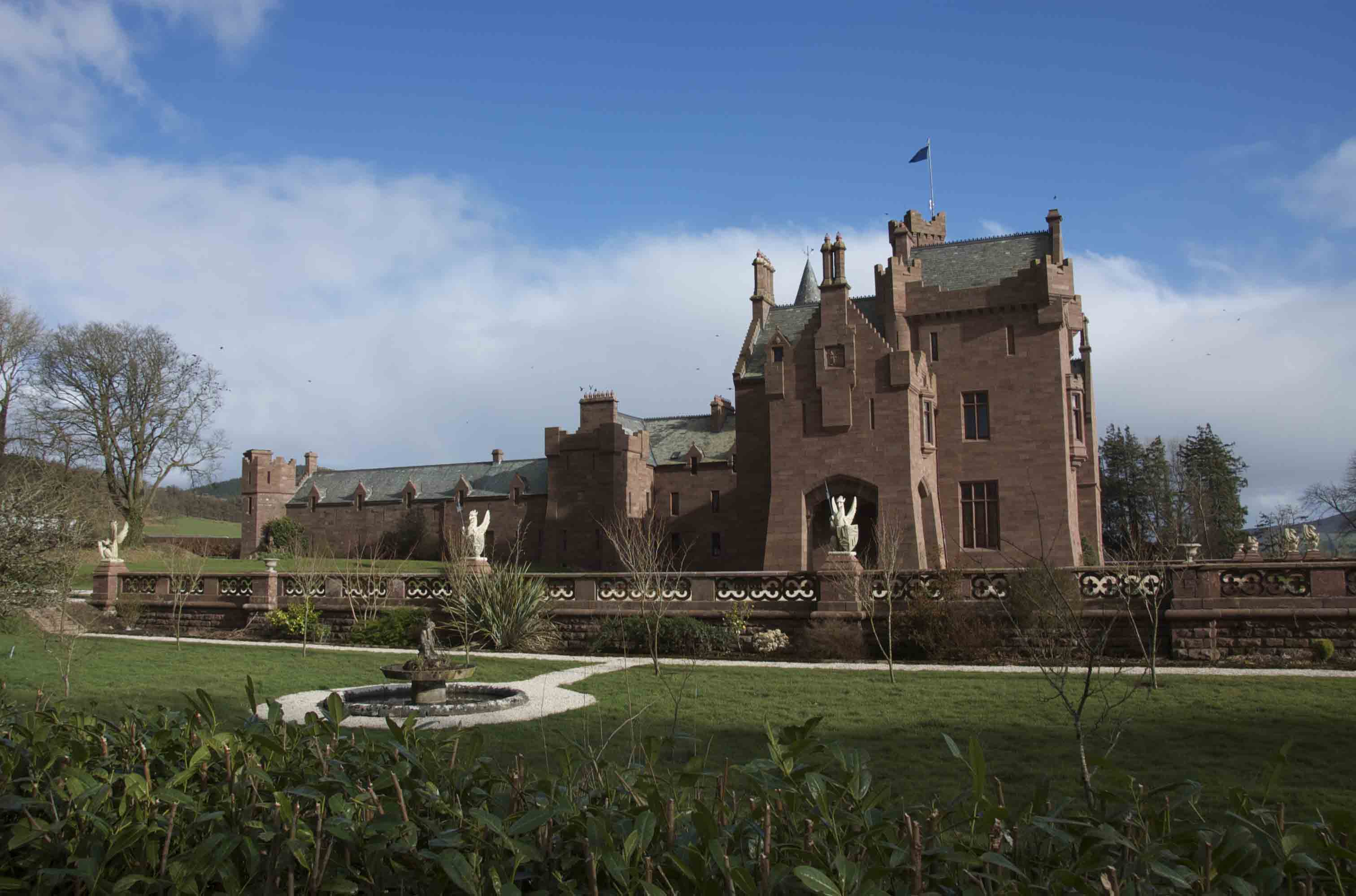
Castle Oliver, Ireland

- Castle Oliver aka Clonodfoy/Clonghanodfoy Castle, Co.Limerick, Ireland (1845–52) Scottish Baronial; also commissioned by the Oliver Gascoigne sisters, it is a 110-room private residence with two matching gate lodges built of pink sandstone quarried locally. It featured Minton encaustic tiles and stained glass, as well as decorative ceilings, all designed by the sisters. The stonework was built by Thos. H Carroll of Dublin; Messrs. Henry & Thos. Creaser, of York, were the contractors for the interior finishings; Johnston Silley & Co, Decorator, Dublin, executed the decorative paintwork (still being completed in 1857) and Mr John Walker, of Walker Iron Foundry, York, supplied all the ironwork of the roof, etc.
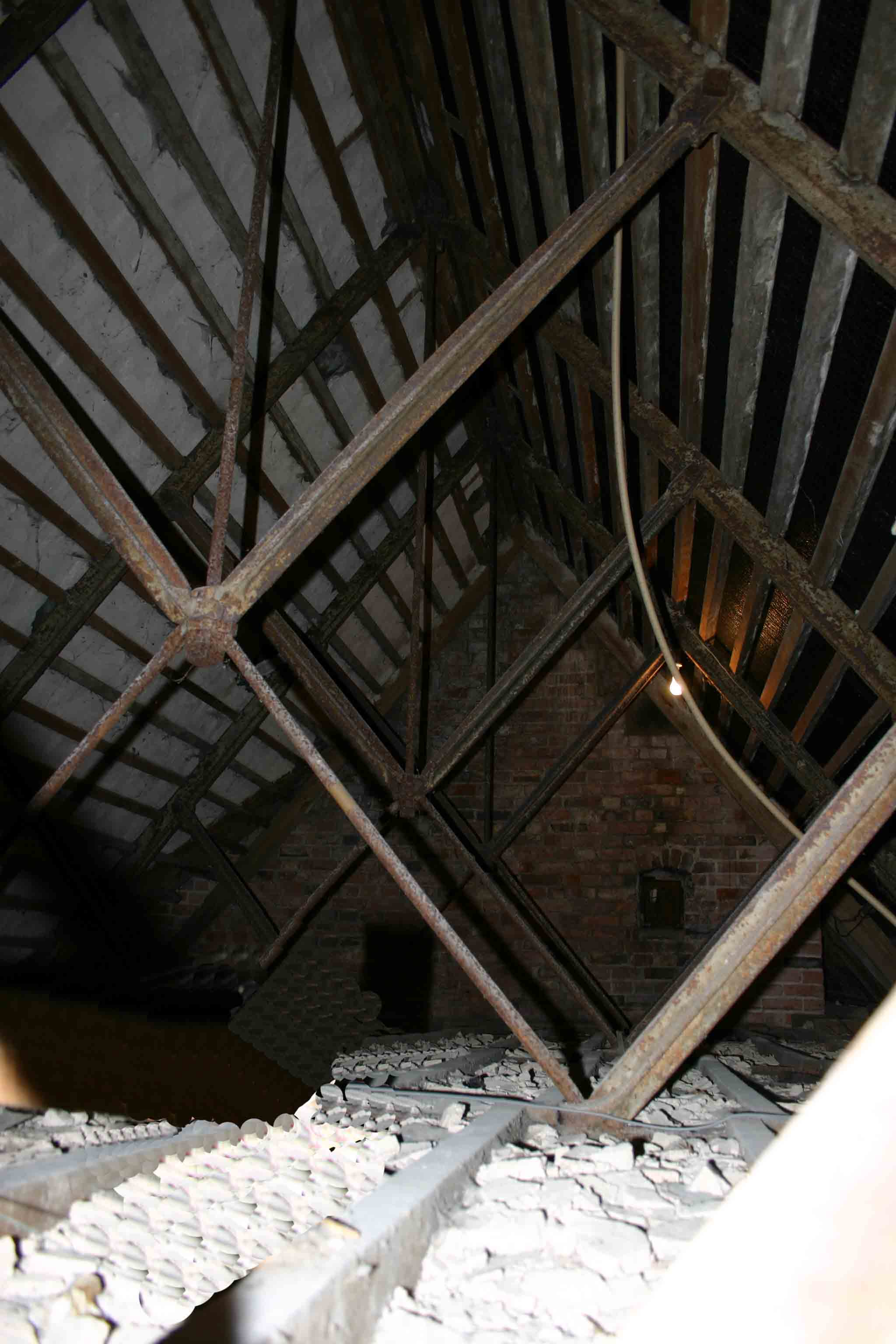
  Iron roof trusses, Castle Oliver, Ireland
  Monograms of Carroll and Creaser, the two main contractors, feature in a decorative terracotta panel set high in the gable overlooking the courtyard. See examples of this and other features: Jones designed large stone gryphons, eleven of which sat on the balustrade surrounding the castle. These were probably carved from Portland Stone and disintegrated in the wet Irish climate in the early 20th century. Facsimiles have been created from photographic evidence and a limited edition made available . Small scale plans signed by Jones and dated 24 June 1845 are in the Manuscripts Room at Dublin Library. The castle is remarkable for its simple, but immensely effective and durable cast & wrought iron roof trusses, which were made in numbered component form in York and assembled on site. These trusses are believed to have been relatively 'cutting edge' at the time, although it appears that Walker Iron Foundry made similar ones in 1843 to restore the nave roof of York Minster. Castle Oliver and its main lodge featured in 'The Builder' Journal of 23 November 1850; Vol. 8, No.407, pp 558 & 559, (with descriptive text at foot of p559) , with beautifully etched pictures (but the reproductions are of low quality). The castle underwent refurbishment between 1998–2007 and is available on short-term let.
- Kilham National School (1846) M. Bastiman of Kilham, builder.
- York: St John's Church, Micklegate, York (1846) Jones' first substantial commission in York, awarded following his reading of a Paper on the Ancient Cross at Sherburn, to the Committee of the Archaeological Society at a York meeting. Chancel shortened to allow road widening, 1850–51.
- South Dalton, Yorkshire (East Riding): village school (1847–48) for Lord Hotham, Tudor style. Enlarged 1881.
- Danby Church, Yorkshire: supervised rebuilding of chancel (Yorks Gazette 25 March 1848)
- Scorborough Hall, Yorkshire (East Riding): addition of new front block, 1848–49, for Lord Hotham or James Hall (Pevsner)
- Drax Church, Yorkshire: restoration (Yorks Gazette 18 October 1851)
- Craignish, Argyllshire, Scotland: Church (now a Primary School) for the Craignish Castle Estate owned by Mary Isabella and Col. Frederick Trench-Gascoigne. (circa 1852) Jones is also believed to have designed additions and alterations to Craignish Castle itself.
- York: Church of St Thomas, Lowther Street: new church, Early English style, 1853–54 (Pevsner)
- Bedale Church, Yorkshire: restoration (Yorks Gazette 24 March 1855)
- Clifton Hospital, York (1854 and after) Numerous additions and alterations to North & East Ridings Lunatic Asylum are catalogued at the University of York's Borthwick Institute for Archives Catalogue Ref CLF. There are many sets of plans and drawings in the archive, the majority dated 1855, but also 1856-7 and 1868. Works continued thereafter, but plans are signed by Jones' son Gascoigne Hastings Fowler Jones, dated 1889–1907. Ref:
- Cambridge District Asylum at Fulbourn, Cambridge (1855) cost £40,000. Elizabethan Style with grey brick dressed in red stone. The first architect was sacked after four years of procrastination, incurring legal costs of £3,000, the commission was then awarded to Jones. It was redeveloped in the 1990s as a Science Park and offices. Aerial photo showing landscaping: Many more photos:
- Burrill, Yorkshire (North Riding): chapel of ease, 1856, Gothic (Pevsner)
- Fairfield Hospital Listed Grade II. Former building known as 'Three Counties Asylum of Bedfordshire, Hertfordshire & Huntingdonshire' at Fairfield, Stotfold, Bedfordshire (1856–60) Opened 8 March 1860 at a cost of £114,831 and could hold 450 patients. Jones designed 'an elegant yellow brick building...the clay for which came from the Green Lagoon just behind the site of the new asylum' . The hospital featured a corridor half a mile long, the longest in the UK. A Dining Room wing was added by Jones in (1870–72). In (1870 & 1877) Jones provided plans, the building contracts being awarded to William Bellerby & Co (WB's son, also William had been Jones' articled pupil some ten years previously). Closed in 1999, the main facade was restored and the building renamed Fairfield Hall, having been converted to apartments. The entire hospital complex now constitutes a village called Fairfield. There is a comprehensive archive of the hospital, including Jones' original plans and many photos that he took.
- Bridlington, Yorkshire (East Riding): Infants CofE School, (1857) Plans of existing buildings drawn, purpose unknown.
- York: The Red Tower, City Walls , Foss Islands Road: reconstruction and reroofing, (1857–58) Photo:
- Bolton-on-Swale, Yorkshire (North Riding): St Mary's Church restored and enlarged (1857 or 1859) (Pevsner)
- York: St Thomas's National School, Lowther St.: new building in polychrome brick (1858)
- St Mary's Abbey, York, within the grounds of the York Museum Gardens. Council of the Yorkshire Philosophical Society (1859) requested Jones to inspect and report on the condition of the 13th century ruins. Jones then supervised repairs costing £41. 16s. 6d. Jones' photo of the ruin: Note Jones' distinctive monogram in the lower left corner and the date 1884.
- Rudston, near Bridlington, Yorkshire (East Riding): All Saints Church (1861) Restoration, including rebuilding of aisles and south porch and heightening of tower, and redecoration including exuberant use of Minton tilework. Total cost £2,000
- York: 78 Bootham: new house for himself, 1862 (Buildings of England)
- Stonegrave, Yorkshire (North Riding): restoration of Holy Trinity church amounting almost to a rebuilding, 1863 (Pevsner)
- Newbald, Yorkshire (East Riding), St Nicholas' church: restoration of chancel, including new reredos and east window, neo-Norman, 1864
- Patrick Brompton, Yorkshire (North Riding), St Patrick's Church: restoration and rebuilding of tower, with 'embattlements and pinnacles' and chancel (1864). Chancel paid for by the rector, cost unknown. All other costs £3,040
- Scruton, Yorkshire (North Riding), St Radegund's church: restoration amounting almost to a rebuilding, 1865 (Pevsner)
- York: St Cuthbert's rectory, Beck Lane: new house, 1865 (Buildings of England)
- Kilham, Yorkshire (East Riding), All Saints church: restoration of nave, 1865–66, unusually tactful (Pevsner)
- York: Triumphal Arch on Ouse Bridge, ephemeral arch for the visit of the Prince & Princess of Wales on 9 August 1866. The wooden structure, 64 ft high, was built by Weatherley & Rymer, painted by T.Worthington. Picture:
- Foxholes, Yorkshire (East Riding), St Mary's Church: rebuilding in neo-Norman style, 1866. Described by Pevsner as "one of the ugliest churches in the Riding".
- Clifton, York: St Philip and St James' Church, (Jan.1866-Consecrated 10 May 1867). Brick, faced in Bradford Stone, with Ancaster Stone dressings. Cost £3,800–4,000. Photos taken by Jones:
- York, Church of St Michael le Belfrey: rebuilding of the West Front (1867)
- St Thomas's Church-in-the-Groves (1867)
- St Leonard's Hospital (1868) Report on state of vaulting. Invoice for £4 4sh. (ref Yorks Phil. Soc. Bundle 7b Corresp. 1850–1939)
- Kildale, Yorkshire (North Riding), St Cuthbert's Church: rebuilt in 13th century Style (1868). Viking cemetery discovered on site. Until his death in 1810 the manor of Kildale belonged to the father-in-law of the Oliver Gascoigne sisters' own father, Richard Oliver Gascoigne).
- Stamford Bridge, Yorkshire (East Riding): St John-the-Baptist Church, (1868) A chapel of ease in Early English Style. Yellow sandstone with limestone dressings. Photos of the pretty interior:
- Heworth, Yorkshire: Holy Trinity church, Melrosegate (1868–69) Early English Style. Builder John Keswick & Co. Cost £6,436. Jones donated the stained glass West Gable window. Photos taken by Jones: Described by Pevsner as "a major work, but fussy".
- Amotherby, Yorkshire (East Riding), St Helen's Church: addition of neo-Norman north aisle and chancel, 1872 (Pevsner)
- East Witton, Yorkshire (North Riding), St John's church: remodelling, including lengthening of chancel, 1872 (Pevsner)
- Kirby Knowle, Yorkshire (North Riding): St Wilfred's Church (1873), Gothic Built at a cost of £1,300.
- Bilbrough, Yorkshire (North Riding), St James' Church (1873) Norman Style, costing £2,264. Described by Pevsner as "Truly hideous".
- York: Club Chambers, Museum Street: new building, circa 1873, polychrome brick, French Renaissance style (Pevsner)
- 'New Building' near Thirsk, seat of the Elsley family, extensive rebuilding
- York Museum Gardens Lodge & Gates in Gothic Revival Style at the main entrance (1874). Photos taken by Jones:
- Old Malton, Yorkshire (North Riding), St Mary's Priory Church: extensive rebuilding (1877).
- Fairfield Hospital chapel (Consecrated December 1879).
- Butterwick, Yorkshire (East Riding), St Nicholas Church: restoration including rebuilding of east end in Perpendicular style (1882–83). (Pevsner)
- Parlington Hall, Leeds, set of plans drawn of house and grounds, purpose unknown (1885)
- St Olave's Church, York. rebuilding of chancel (1887–89)
- Clifton Hospital (23 December 1892) New Laundry Block (Ref. York University CLF2/2/1/3)
- Kettins, Angus, Scotland: a Lytch Gate in the Parish Kirkyard (1902) (B-Listed)
