= Clifton, York =

Suburb of York, England

Coordinates: 53.97206°N 1.09791°W

Clifton
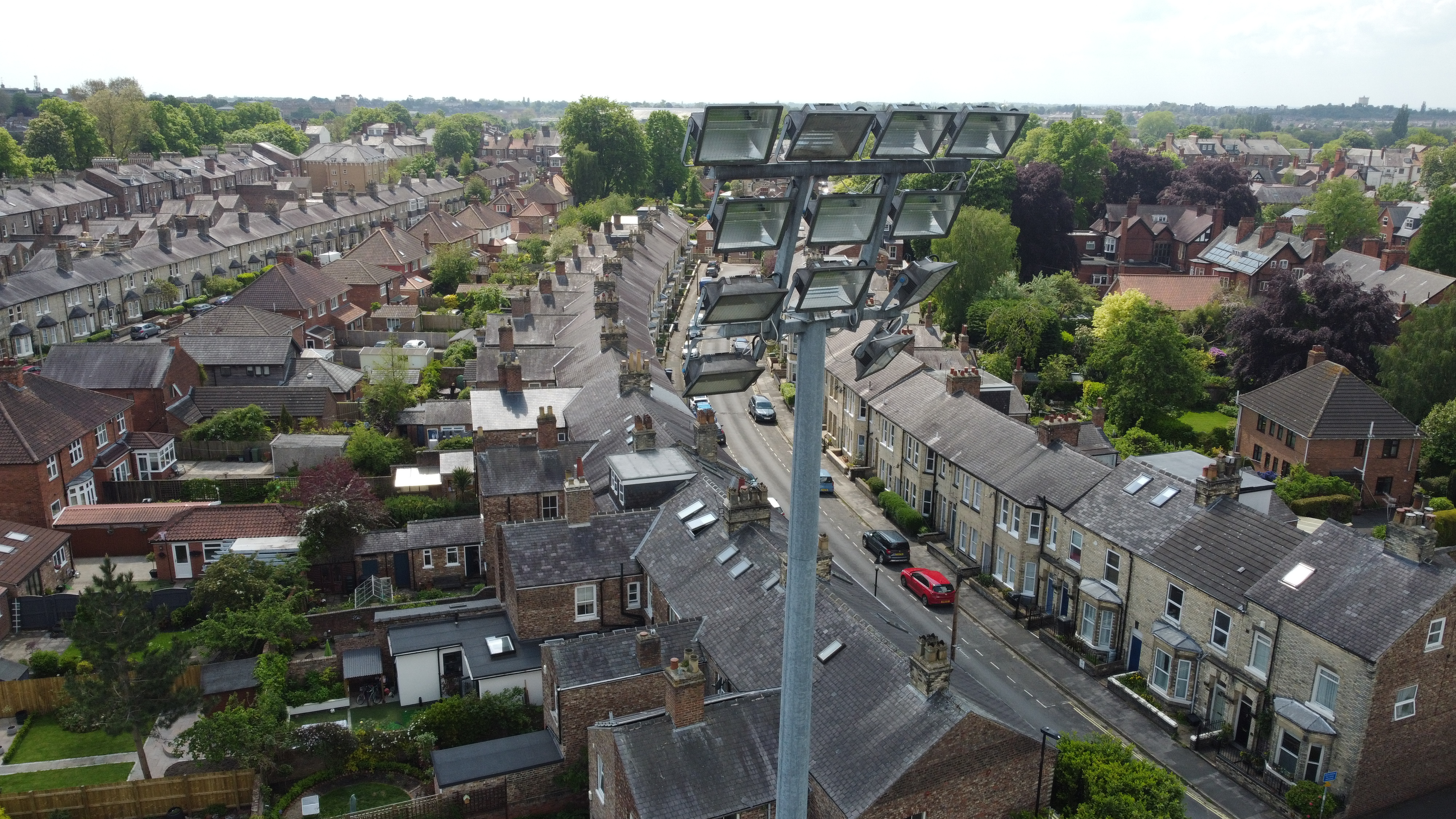
- View over the terraces of Clifton

- Location within North Yorkshire
- Population: 13,548 (Ward. 2011 census)
- OS grid reference: SE592532
- Unitary authority: City of York
- Ceremonial county: North Yorkshire
- Region: Yorkshire and the Humber
- Country: England
- Sovereign state: United Kingdom
- Post town: YORK
- Postcode district: YO30
- Dialling code: 01904
- Police: North Yorkshire
- Fire: North Yorkshire
- Ambulance: Yorkshire
- UK Parliament: York Central

Clifton is a suburb of York in the unitary authority area of the City of York, in North Yorkshire, England, about 1 1/2 miles from the city centre. The A19 passes north out of York through Clifton.

The old village area was made a conservation area in 1968. Nestle Foods Factory and the public school of St Peter's and the former Queen Anne's Grammar School are located in Clifton.

The name Clifton is derived from the Old English pre-7th-century clif, meaning a gentle slope, or more usually a riverbank, and tun, an enclosure or settlement.

== History ==
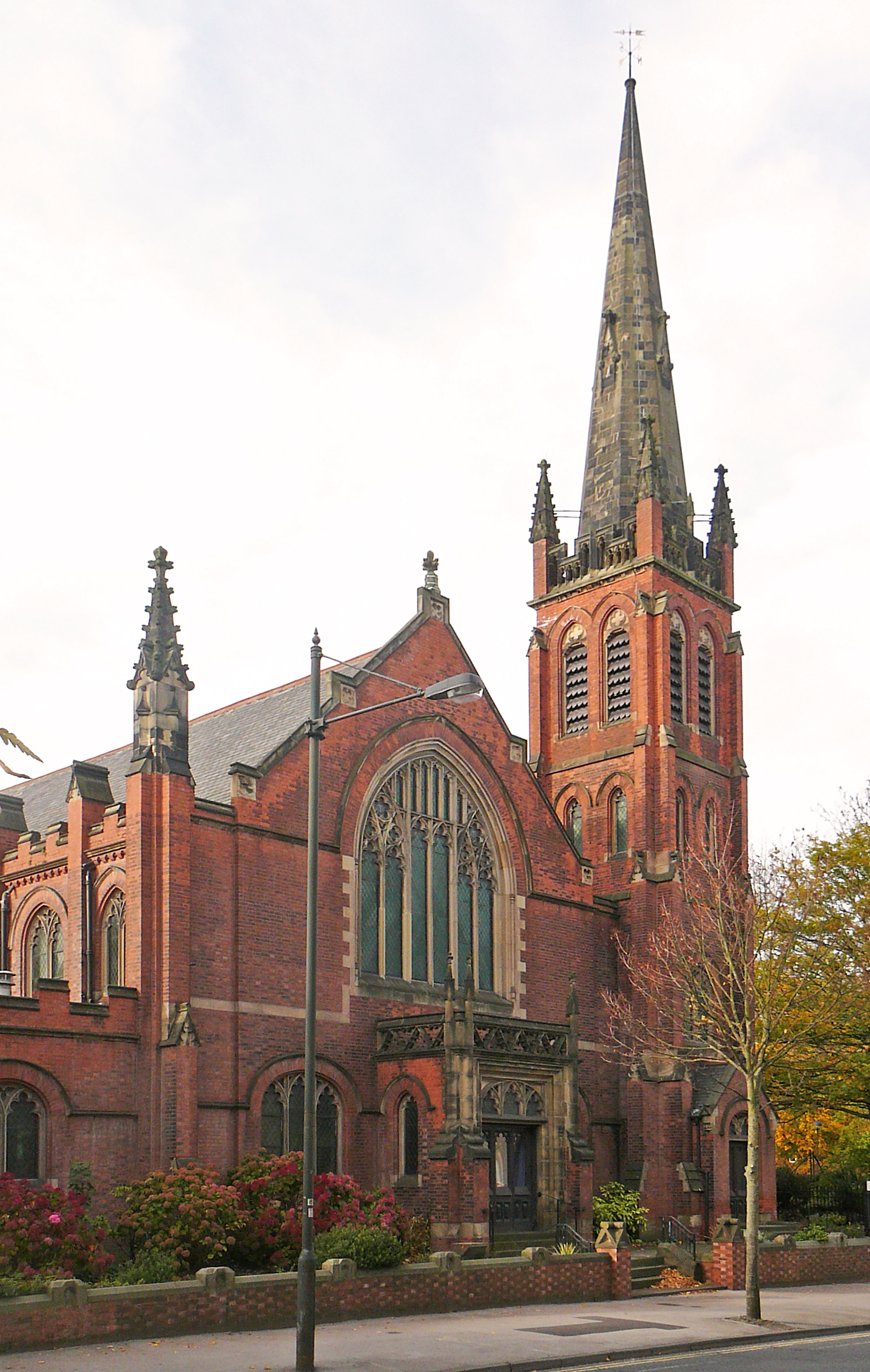
Clifton Methodist Church

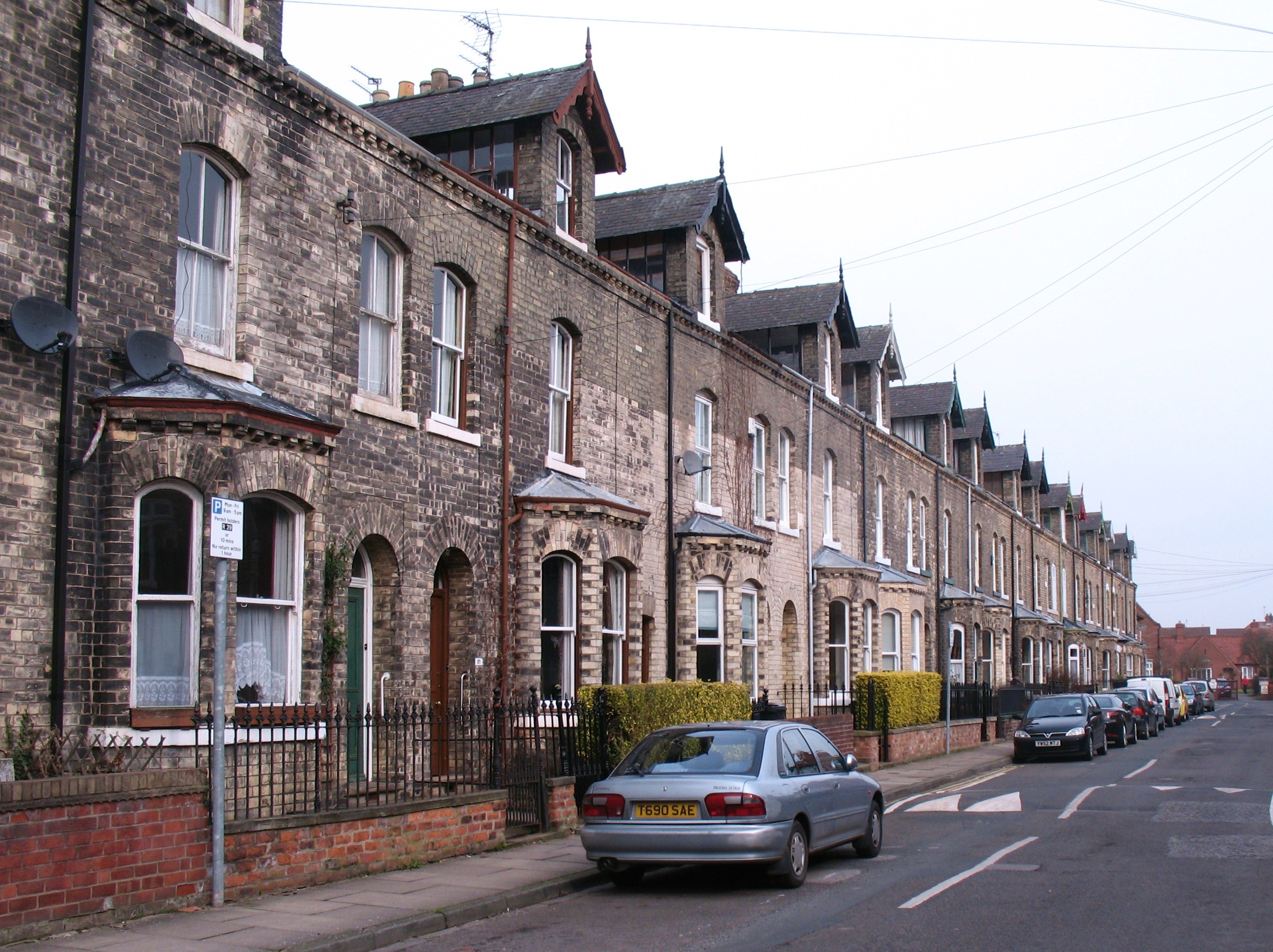
Avenue Terrace

During Roman times a road through Clifton approached the Roman fortress in York from the north-west and headed towards the river crossing. A second road that left the fortress's north-west gate may eventually have joined the other. The evidence from early timber buildings from the museum gardens and early burials from Bootham and Clifton suggest the roads existed from the 1st century. Sporadic 2nd-century Roman occupation material and fragments of streets indicate that by that time expansion may have begun in Clifton. This development was not sustained and evidence indicates that from the 3rd century onwards the area beyond St Mary's was given over to cemeteries.

Records show Clifton or Lady Windmill existed from the late 14th to the early 19th centuries on Burton Stone Lane. Between 1374 and 1413 it belonged to John de Roucliff. Other owners were Sir William Ingleby in the mid-15th century, and Sir William Robinson in the early 18th century. The last record of the mill being operational was in 1852, but there is no trace of the building now.

The district was badly damaged during the Siege of York. On the street named Clifton, the timber-framed Old Manor House was rebuilt after the siege but is now Grade II* listed.

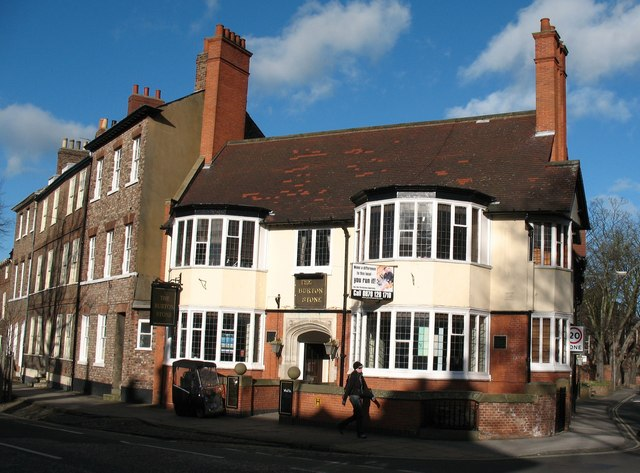
The Burton Stone Inn takes it name from the medieval cross base that stands in front of it

Horse racing began in York towards the end of the 17th century. In 1708 the corporation recognised the potential for profit from horse racing and after Clifton landowner, Sir William Robinson, offered his land on Clifton and Rawcliffe Ings as a racecourse and donated £15 a year towards a plate. Following the winter of 1730 racing moved to the recently drained Knavesmire.

The York Diocesan Church Building Society, founded in 1861, contributed to building the parish church between 1867 and 1869.

== Governance ==
Clifton is a ward in the unitary authority of the City of York. As of 2015, it is represented by Danny Myers and Margaret Wells, both of whom are members of the local Labour Party.

Clifton was a township in the parish of St Olave-Mary-Gate, in 1866 Clifton became a civil parish, in 1894 the parish was abolished and the part in the County Borough of York became Clifton Within and that in the rural district became Clifton Without. In 1891 the parish had a population of 7770. Until 1974 Clifton was in the North Riding of Yorkshire.

== Demography ==
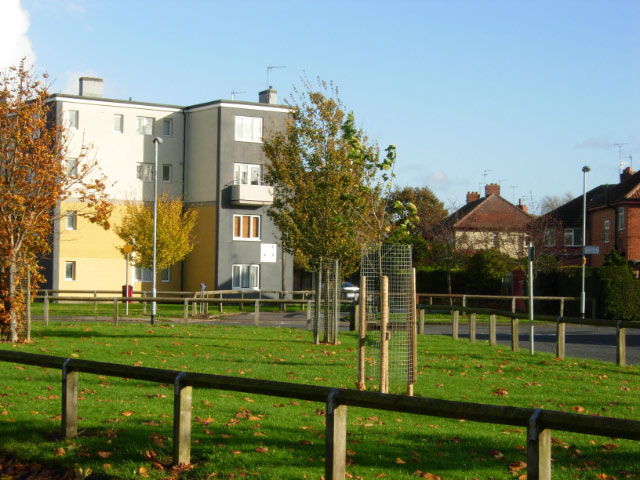
Kingsway North, Clifton

The figures below were taken from the Census 2001 Key Statistics for Local Authorities in England and Wales, from the Office for National Statistics on 29 April 2001.

The population in Clifton Ward was 12,017 of which 91.1% were born in England and 4.9% from outside the United Kingdom. The largest age group, 22.2%, were between 30 and 44 years old. Of the total population, 94.6% described their ethnic origin as White-British. The figures show that 67.8% declared they were Christian, whilst 30.2% declared no religious belief. Of the population aged between 16 and 74 years old, 59.7% declared they were in some form of employment and 10.5% said they were retired. Of the 5,337 households, 21% lived in semi-detached and 57.5% in terraced houses. The level of household ownership was 58%. In 2011, the population of Clifton rose to 13,548 in 5,652 houses.

== Geography ==
Clifton is bounded by the parish of Rawcliffe and Clifton Without to the north, Holgate to the south-west, Heworth to the east and Guildhall Ward to the south-east. The ward boundary runs from the River Ouse in the west, opposite Acomb Landing, along the back of the Homestead Park and York Sports Club and across the A19 following Water Lane and Lilbourne Drive. It continues north-east along the Bur Dike to behind Burton Green Primary School before heading south-east and then east across Bootham Stray, the B1363 and the Nestle Factory to the River Foss. The river forms the eastern boundary as far as Diamond Street and Walpole Street, where it heads west and then south to the junction of Clarence Street with the Haxby and Wigginton Roads. It heads west past the York District Hospital and then south along the York to Scarborough railway line until it reaches the River Ouse at Scarborough Bridge. The remainder of the boundary follows the river north-west to Acomb Landing.

== Economy ==
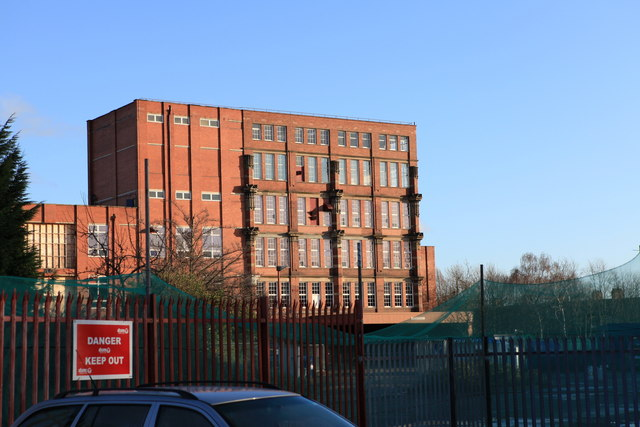
Nestlé factory York

Most of the population find employment in the city centre or in the many retail and industrial parks on the outskirts of York, including Clifton Moor in the neighbouring area of Clifton Without. The Clifton Moor Retail Park features national chains such as Currys, DFS, Gear4music and Subway, offering a broad mix of amenities and local employment opportunities. Employment can also be found within the ward at the Nestlé Foods Factory on Haxby Road and the York District Hospital on Wigginton Road.

== Community ==
The City of York General Hospital was built by the city corporation in 1938, but was work suspended during the war. The building, comprising half of the intended scheme cost about £100,000, it was opened in 1941 between Huntington Road and Haxby Road. The hospital was next to the Grange and shared facilities, including the nurses' home. The hospital was expanded and renamed York District Hospital in 1977 and from 2010 is now known as The York Hospital.

The North Riding Lunatic Asylum joined the National Health Service as Clifton Hospital in 1948 but closed in 1994.

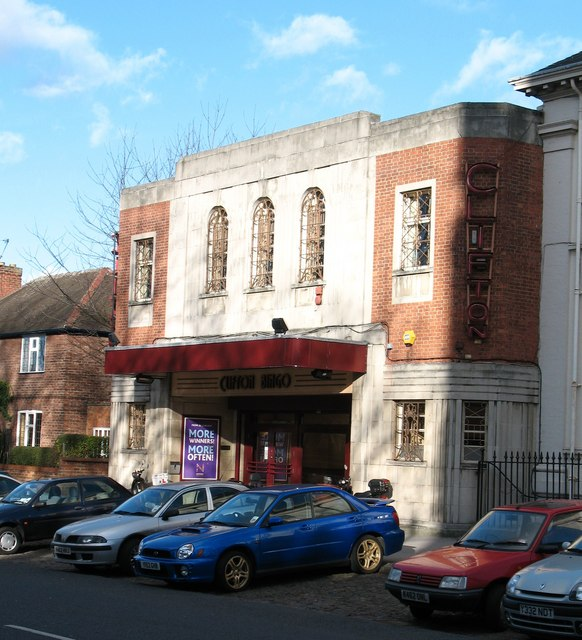
Clifton Bingo

Clifton Cinema was built for Mr J. Prendergast and Mr Mawson to the designs of Frederick Dyer. It is of Georgian style and the designers were responsible for the Rialto Cinema, now a bingo hall, on Fishergate. The Clifton opened on 17 November 1937 with the film The Edge of the World starring John Laurie and Finlay Currie, directed by Michael Powell. The cinema seated 1,150 in the stalls and balcony. It was equipped with a two manual Compton organ, first played in 1938 but removed in the early 1960s. The Clifton survived longer than many of York's cinemas, but closed on 17 October 1964 with the final film being Valley of Eagles. As of 2010, it is the home of Clifton Bingo and Social Club.

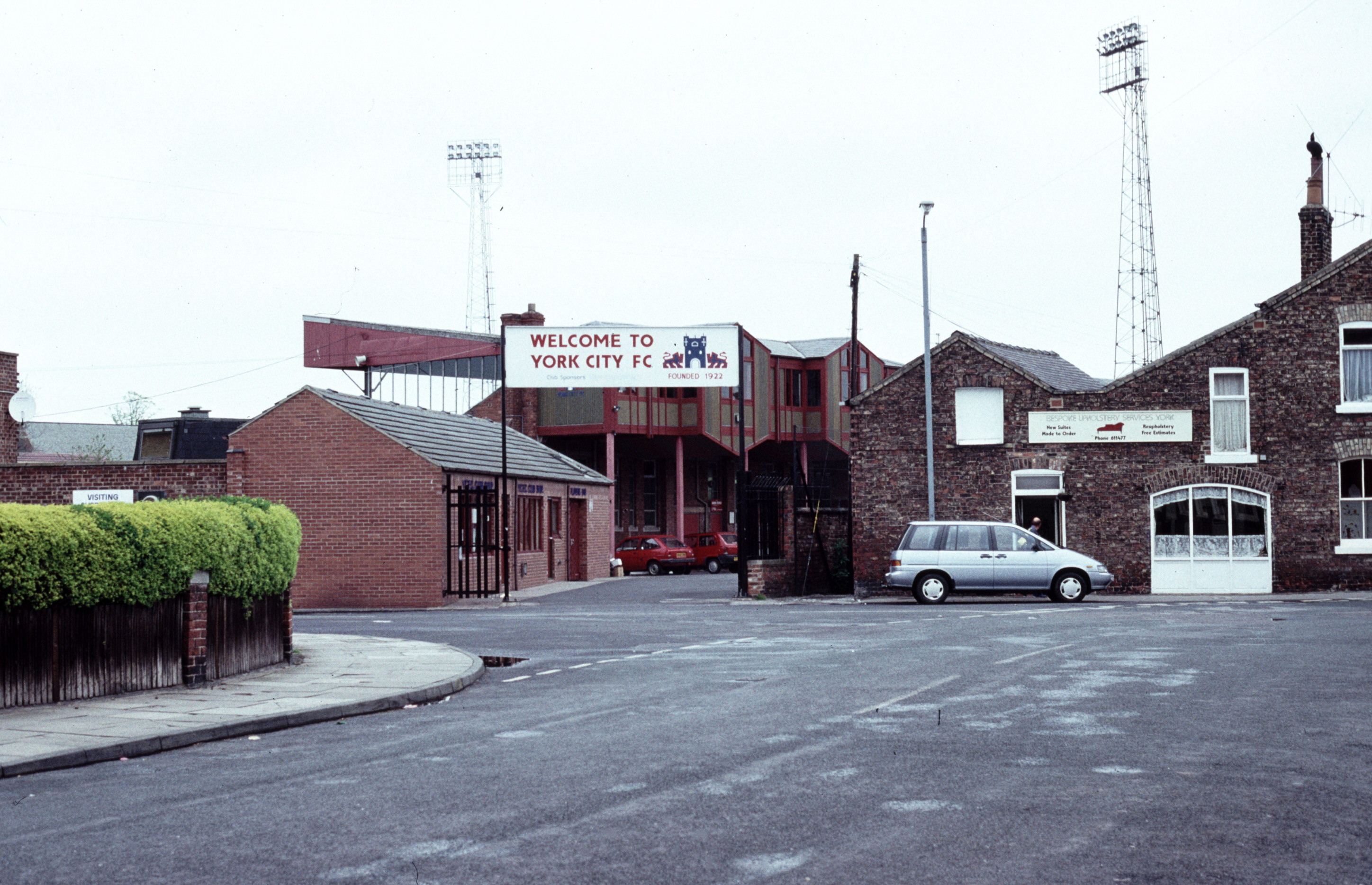
Entrance to Bootham Crescent Stadium

Bootham Crescent, the old home of York City F.C., was located in Clifton before it was demolished to make way for a housing estate.

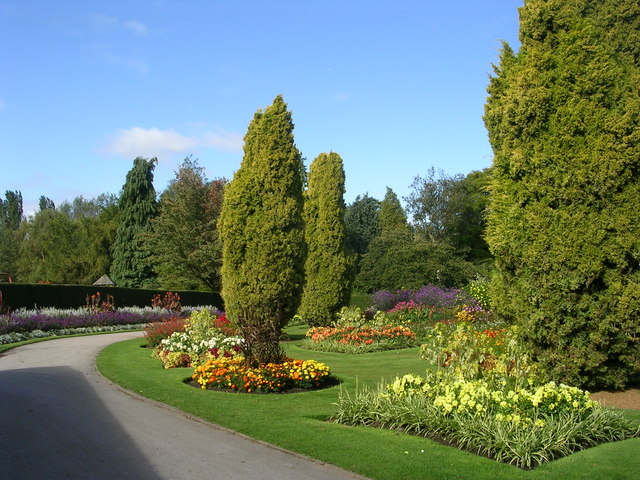
Homestead Park

Homestead Park on Water End has a youth hostel in its grounds. The park was given to the people of the city by Seebohm Rowntree, son of Joseph. It is maintained by the Joseph Rowntree Foundation.

There are council-run allotments at Crichton Avenue and Wigginton Terrace, just off Wigginton Road.

== Transport ==
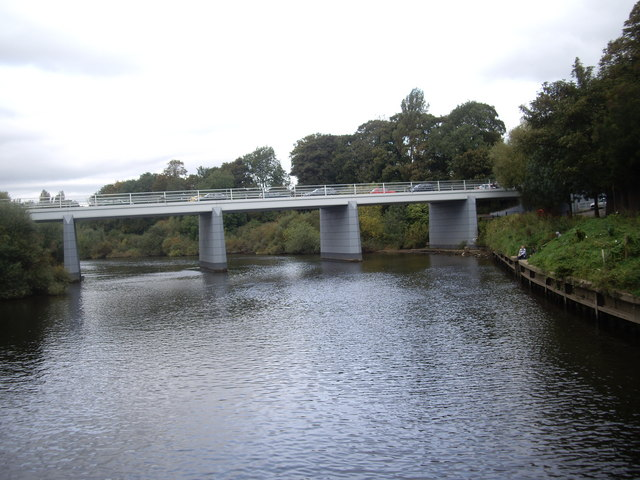
Clifton Bridge

Because the A19 and Clifton Retail Park are within the ward boundary, Clifton is served by many bus routes. As of 2013 they are:

- Rawcliffe Bar Park & Ride to the City Centre run by First Transport Group
- Clifton Moor to Osbaldwick run by First Transport Group
- York to Easingwold via Linton-On-Ouse run by Stephensons of Easingwold Ltd
- York to Easingwold via Alne and Tollerton run by Stephensons of Easingwold Ltd
- York to Kirbymoorside via Easingwold and Helmsley run by Stephensons of Easingwold Ltd
- York to Helmsley run by Stephensons of Easingwold Ltd
- City Centre to Skelton via Burton Stone Lane, Leeman Road (Towards City), Bur Dyke Avenue, Brompton Road & Rawcliffe run by Reliance
- Askham Bar to University of York via Acomb, Poppleton, Rawcliffe, Clifton Moor, Wigginton, Haxby, New Earswick, Huntington, Monks Cross & Osbaldwick run by Transdev York
- York to Thirsk run by Reliance Motor Services

== Education ==
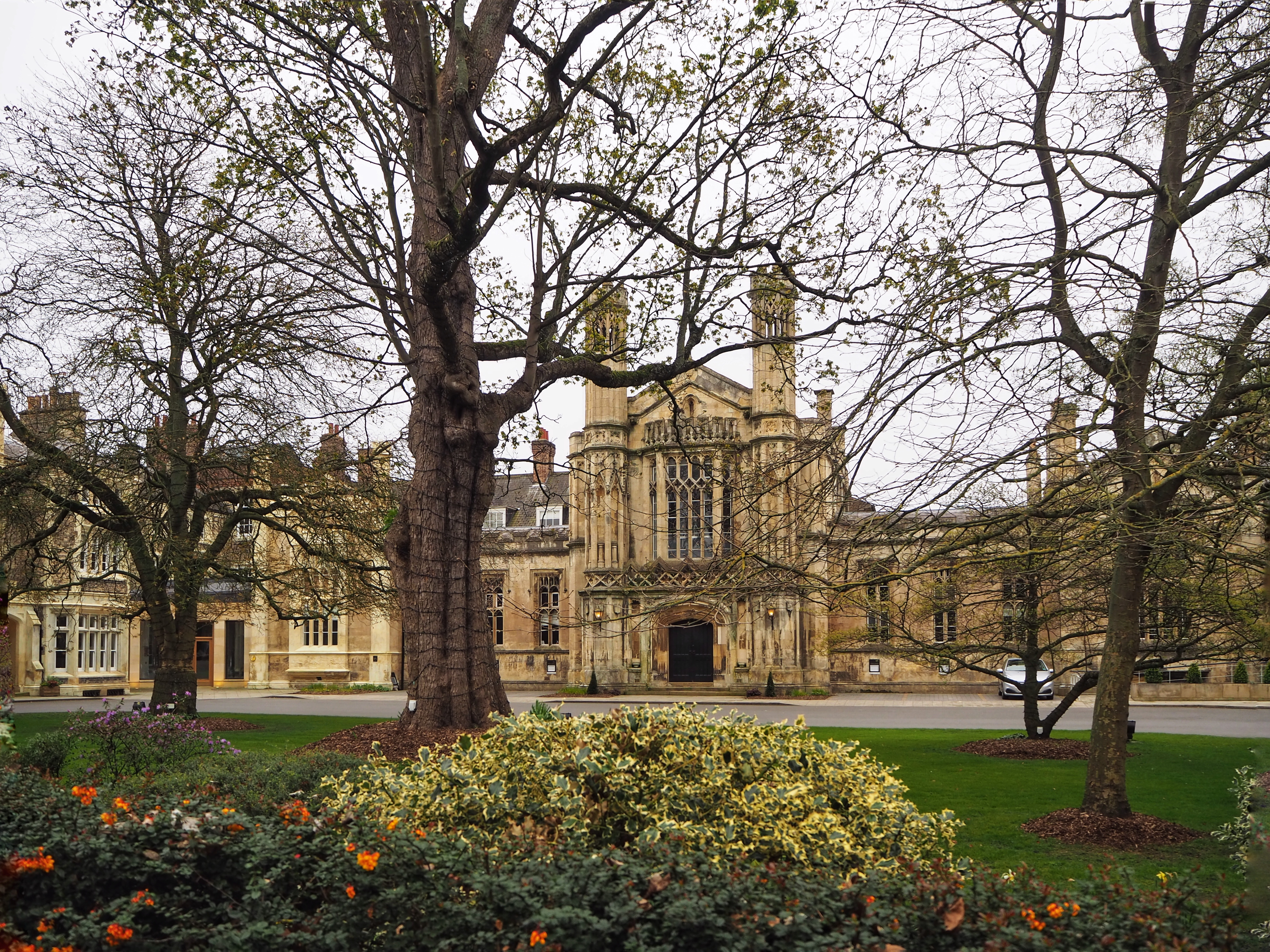
St Peter's School facing onto Clifton

St Peter's School, an independent, co-educational secondary school was founded in the 7th century, and is the third-oldest school in the world. St Peter's was originally the school attached to York Minster. The school is where Guy Fawkes was educated. Queen Anne Grammar School for Girls began as the Municipal Secondary School for Girls in 1906, located on Brook Street, and was officially recognised as a secondary school in 1908. The Brook Street premises were closed in 1909 and pupils transferred to a new school building, on a 5 1/2-acre site on Queen Anne's Road, Clifton. New classrooms and additional cloakrooms were erected in 1914. The school closed in 2000 and the campus was taken over by St Olave's School, the junior school of St Peter's.

Clifton National School for Girls and Infants or Burton Stone Lane School, was opened in 1841. In 1878 the girls were transferred to the new Clifton girls' school and Burton Lane continued as an infants' school until 1892 when they rejoined the girls' school. The Burton Lane School was closed in 1892 and the building demolished. In 1914, additional accommodation for the infants was obtained in the parochial hall on Water Lane and the school itself was used for girls only. By 1932 the school had been reorganised to provide infant accommodation only. The school became a controlled voluntary primary school in 1950 and is known as Burton Green School.

Burton Stone Lane County Secondary Modern School was a girls' school, and sometimes known as Water Lane School, was opened in October 1942. The senior girls' department from Shipton Street School was transferred here and formed the nucleus of the school. The building was completed in 1945. As of 2010, it is the council-run Burton Stone Community Centre.

Burdyke County Primary School on Kingsway North, on the Water Lane estate, was opened in September 1954. It is now Burton Green Primary School. Clifton Green Primary School is now known as Kingsway Junior School. Clifton is in the secondary school catchment area of the Vale of York Academy in Clifton Without.

== Religious sites ==
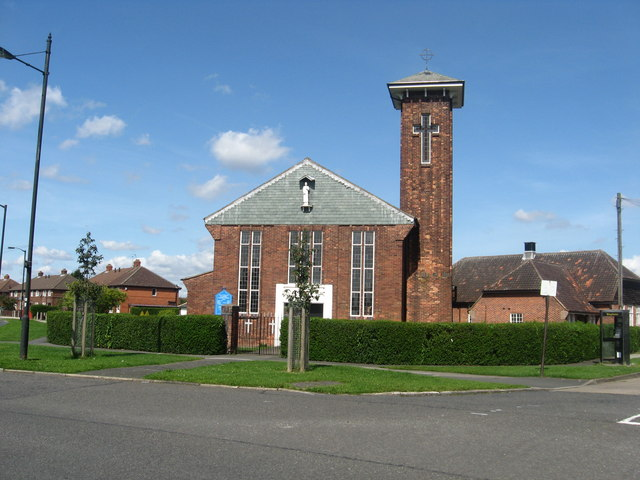
St Joseph's RC Church

The Grade II-listed St Philip and St James' Church, Clifton, was built between 1866 and 1867 next to Clifton Green, G. F. Jones of York being the architect.

The first Methodist society in Clifton met in a cottage in the 1870s and in April 1884 the Avenue Terrace Chapel was opened. A larger chapel on the site of 'Clifton Cottage' was opened in 1909.

St Joseph's Catholic Church is located on the roundabout at the northern end of Kingsway North on Burdyke Avenue.

== Notable people ==
- Will Ashton (1881–1963), impressionist artist, born in Clifton
- Margaret Jowett (1921–2014), children's writer, lived in Clifton
- Derek Pearsall (1931–2021), medieval historian, had a house in Clifton throughout his career and retired there
- Robert Renwick (1937−2024), diplomat and author, born in Clifton
