= Listed buildings in Warthill =

Warthill is a civil parish in the county of North Yorkshire, England. It contains four listed buildings that are recorded in the National Heritage List for England. Of these, one is listed at Grade II*, the middle of the three grades, and the others are at Grade II, the lowest grade. The parish contains the village of Warthill and the surrounding countryside, and the listed buildings are all houses or farmhouses.

== Key ==
Grade	Criteria
II*	Particularly important buildings of more than special interest
II	Buildings of national importance and special interest

== Buildings ==
Name and location	Photograph	Date	Notes	Grade
Walnut Farmhouse; 53.99012°N 0.97216°W	—	Mid to late 18th century	The house is in brick with a floor band, a dentilled eaves course, and a French tile roof with gable coping and tumbled-in gable ends. There are two storeys and three bays. The central doorway has a divided fanlight, and the windows are sashes with wedge lintels.	II
Yew Tree Farmhouse; 53.98970°N 0.97200°W	—	Late 18th to early 19th century	The farmhouse is in brick with a floor band, a dentilled eaves course, and a pantile roof with gable coping and tumbled-in gable ends. There are two storeys and three bays, and a single-storey wing to the left. In the centre is a porch, the windows on the main part of the house are sashes with flat brick arches, and on the wing is a fixed-light window.	II
Brockfield; 53.98663°N 0.99037°W	—	1804	A house designed by Peter Atkinson senior in brick with a Westmorland slate roof. There are two storeys and two bays, and a lower service wing. In the centre of the main block is a projecting porch with pilasters, and a doorway with a cambered brick arch. On the porch is a moulded cornice and a wrought iron balcony, above which is a Venetian window. The other windows are sashes with cambered brick arches. On the garden front is a full-height bow window, and to the left is a single-storey garden room.	II*
Lambs Cottages; 53.99070°N 0.97230°W	—	c. 1820	A house, later two cottages, in red brick with a pantile roof. There are two storeys, four bays, and two- and one-storey outshuts at the rear. On the left of each cottage is a gabled trellised porch with curved bargeboards. The windows are horizontally sliding sashes.	II
