= Brockfield Hall =

Country house in North Yorkshire, England

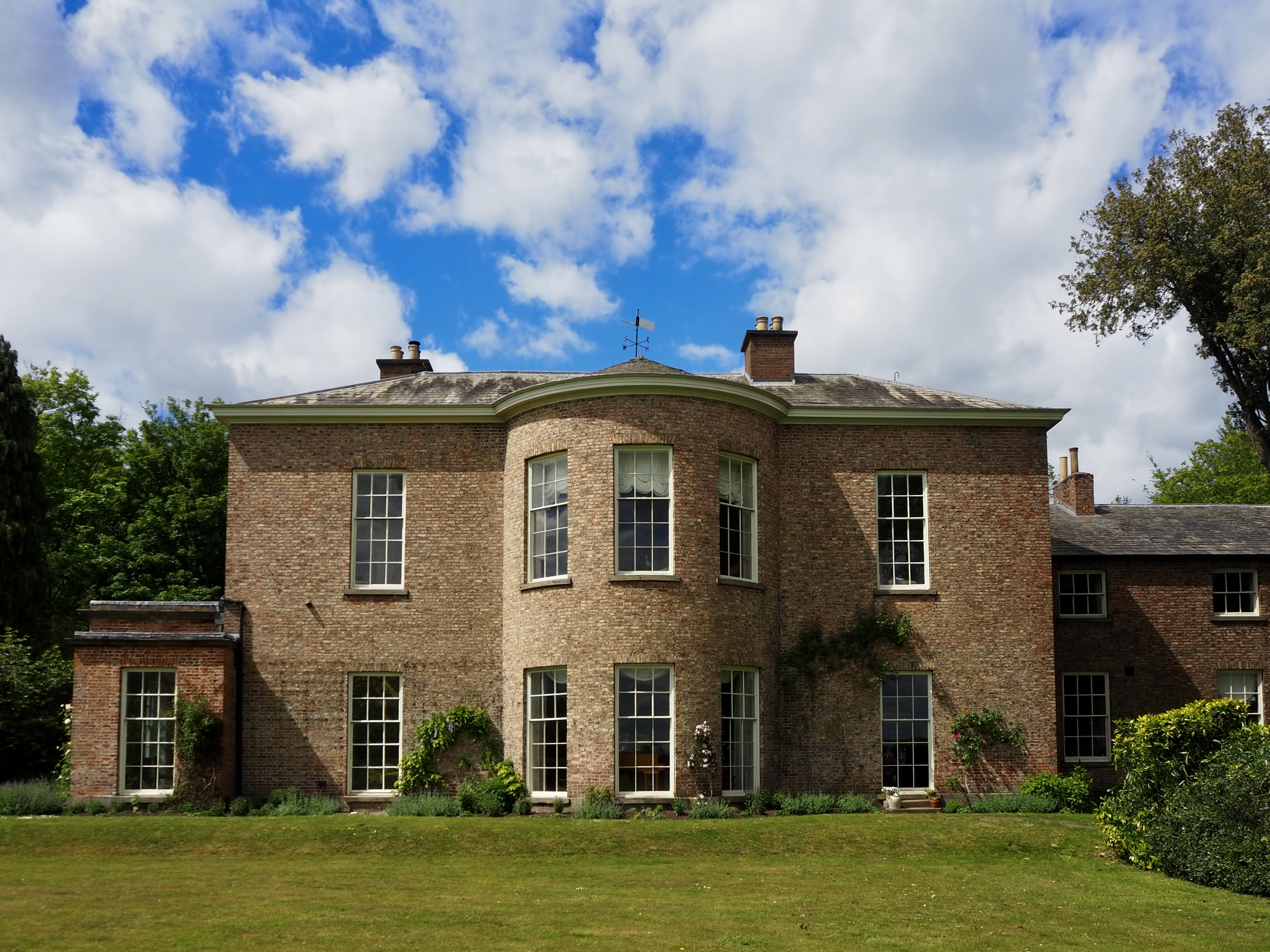
- Interactive map of the Brockfield Hall area

General information
- Architectural style: Georgian
- Location: Warthill, North Yorkshire, YO19 5XJ, UK
- Coordinates: 53°59′13.2″N 0°59′26.4″W
- Completed: 1804
- Owner: Martin Fitzalan Howard family

Design and construction
- Architect: Peter Atkinson
- Architecture firm: John Carr of York

Website
- https://www.brockfieldhall.co.uk/

Brockfield Hall is a country house in Warthill, east of York in North Yorkshire, England.

== History ==
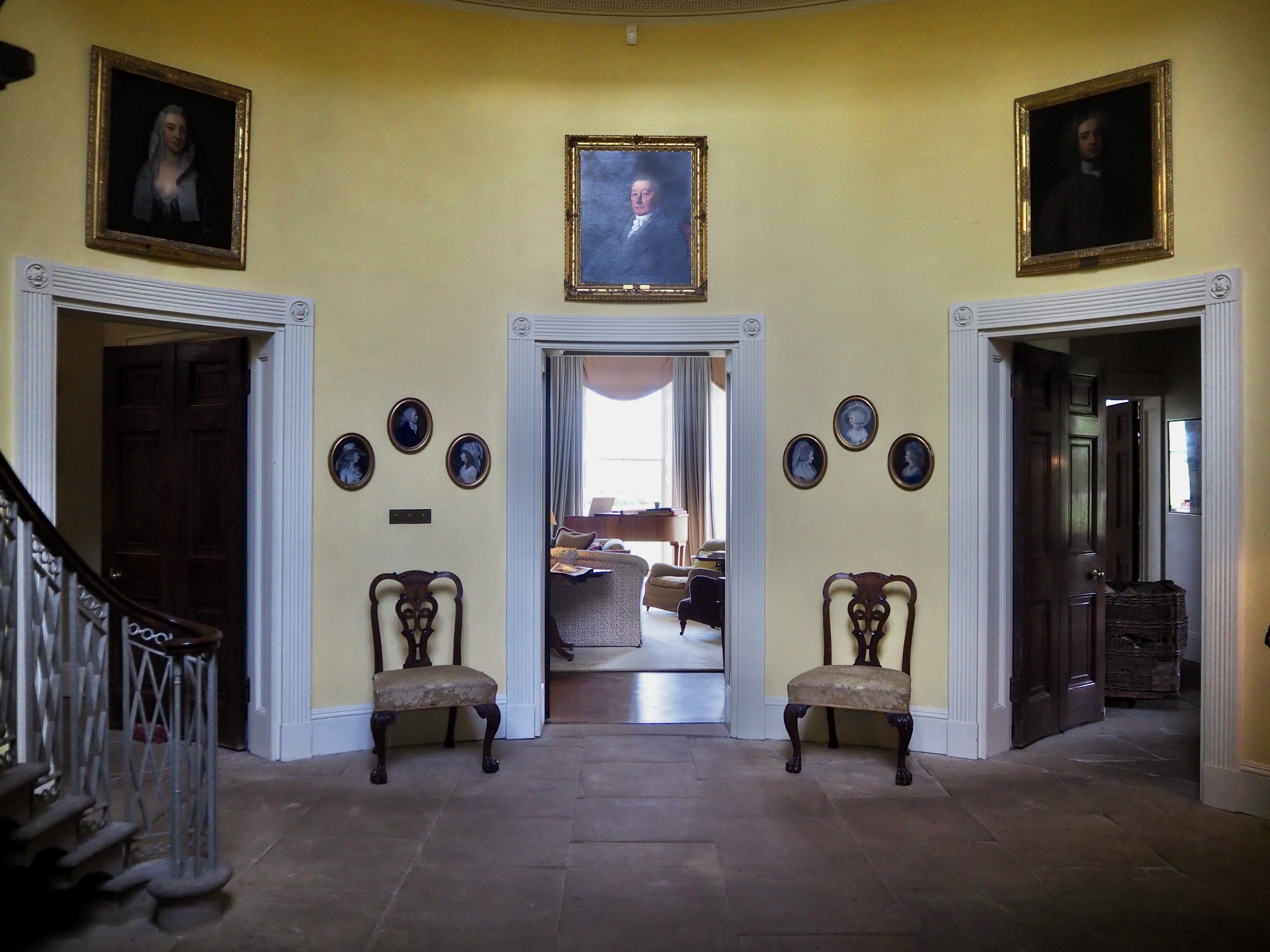
Entrance

The hall was built in 1804 for Benjamin Agar, to a design by Peter Atkinson. It is a two-storey building of brick, with a slate roof, and has three bays. It also has a lower two-storey service wing. On the main front, the central, entrance, bay comes further forward. It has a pilastered porch with a balcony above, and the entrance is arched, with double doors. There is a Venetian window to the balcony, while the other windows are all sashes. The central bay of the garden front is bowed, and a single-storey garden room has been added to the left.

Inside the house, the entrance hall is circular, with a cast iron staircase rising through it. There is a decorative cornice and frieze, which may be slightly later than 1804. The drawing room and morning room also have early decoration.

The house was Grade II listed in 1953, and raised to Grade II* listed in 1987. It was purchased by Martin Fitzalan Howard in 1951, and has since been passed down his family. It contains the largest collection of paintings by the Staithes group of artists. The house is open to the public for one month each year.

== See also ==
- Grade II* listed buildings in North Yorkshire (district)
- Listed buildings in Warthill
