= 51 Bootham =

Listed building in York, England

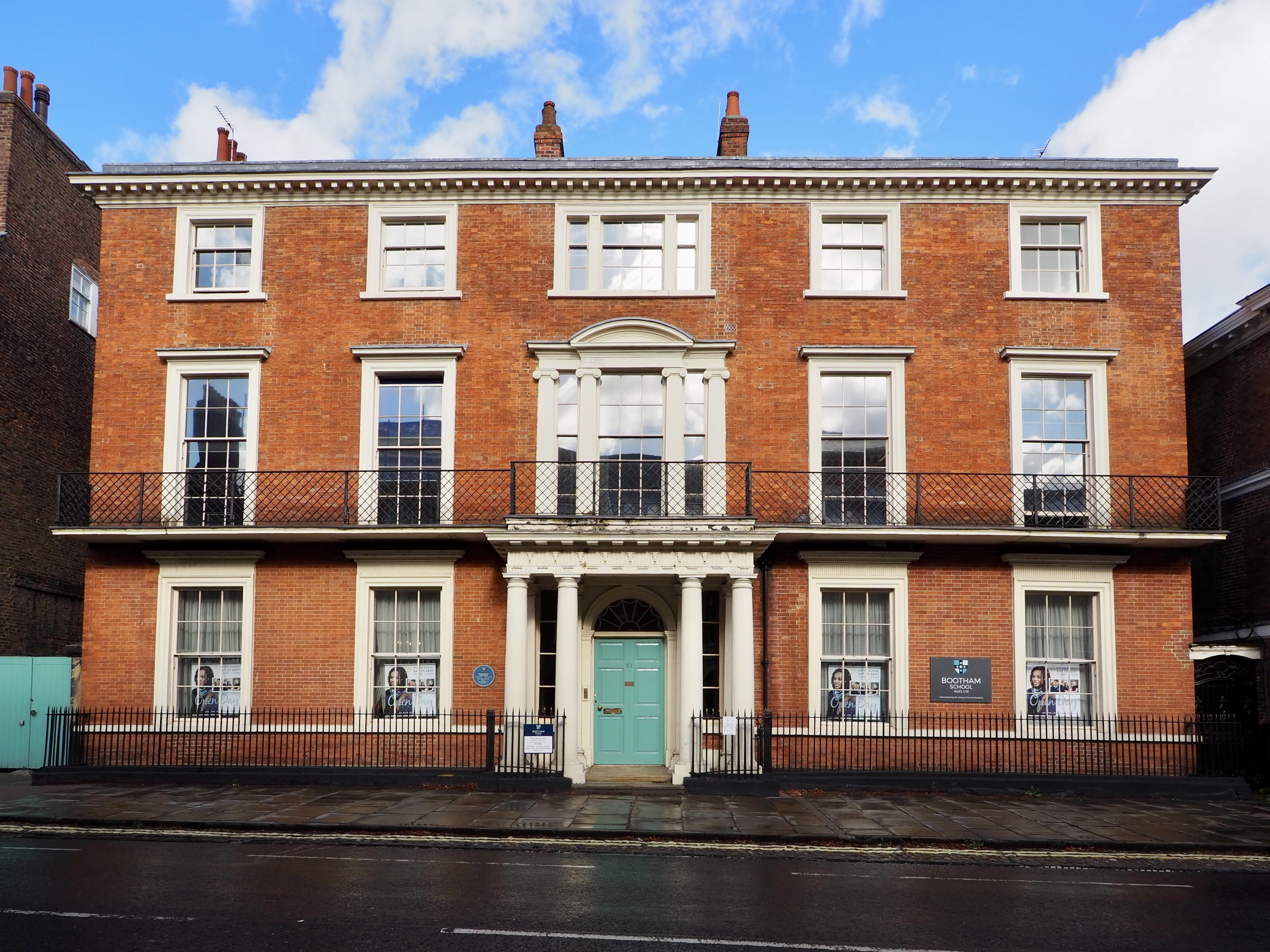
- The building in 2021
- Interactive map of the 51 Bootham area

General information
- Location: Bootham, York, England
- Coordinates: 53°57′51″N 1°05′15″W
- Completed: c. 1804
- Renovated: 19th century (extended rear wing) c. 1956 (altered)
- Client: Richard Vanden-Bempde-Johnstone

Technical details
- Floor count: 3 + cellar + attic

Design and construction
- Architect: Peter Atkinson
- Designations

Listed Building – Grade II*
- Official name: Number 51 and Bootham School block to rear including John Bright Library and attached railings
- Designated: 14 June 1954
- Reference no.: 1259468

51 Bootham is a historic building on Bootham, a street leading north from the city centre of York, England.

The building was designed by Peter Atkinson for Richard Vanden-Bempde-Johnstone and was completed in or shortly after 1804. It was initially known as "Bootham House". In 1846, Bootham School purchased and relocated to the building. The school redesigned the rear wing and extended it. The rearmost part of the building was destroyed in a fire in 1899. In about 1902, it was replaced by a science block (now the John Bright Library) and a gymnasium, designed by Fred Rowntree and W. H. Thorp in the arts and crafts style. In about 1956, the block was altered by Colin Rowntree, work including dividing the gymnasium into classrooms. The building was Grade II* listed in 1954.

The front to Bootham is of brick with stone dressings and a slate roof. It has three storeys, with attics and a basement, and is five bays wide. There are sash windows, becoming less elaborate with each storey, and three dormer windows in the attic. At first floor level there is an iron balcony running the whole width of the building. The door has a fanlight and a Doric portico. The 1902 extension is built of red brick with terracotta dressings. It has an entrance front facing southeast, the door of which has a doorcase in the Ionic order. This section consists of various wings, each of which is two storeys. The library section has bow windows and an octagonal wooden cupola. Inside, the original section has a stone staircase and several original fireplaces, while the 1902 block has panelled classrooms, and a stone staircase with an Art Nouveau balustrade. The library has built-in shelves and a bronze memorial plaque to John Bright.

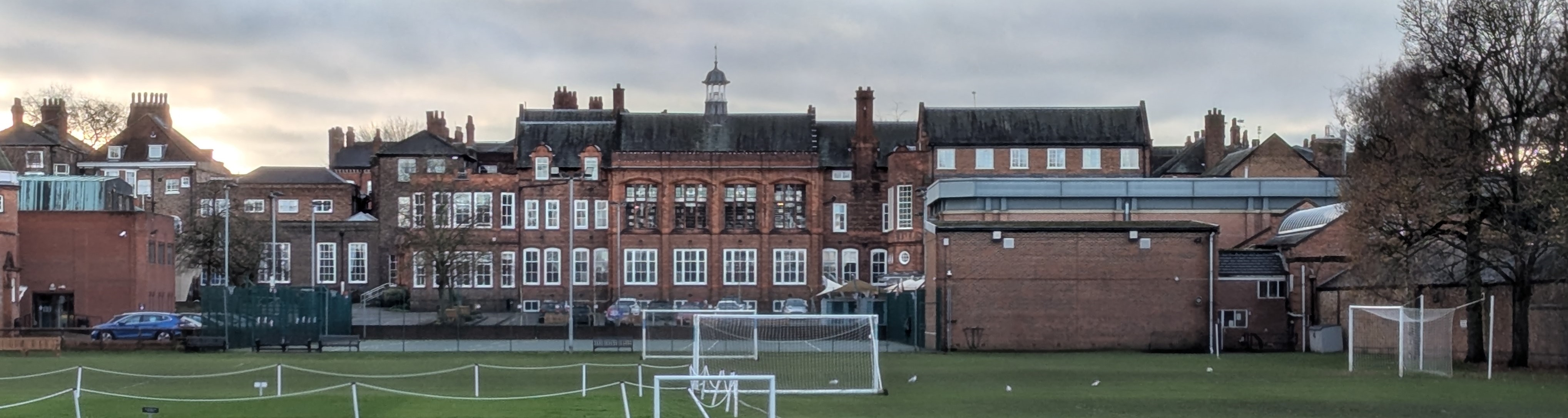
Rear view of Bootham school, including the rear wing of No. 51 in the centre

== See also ==
- Grade II* listed buildings in the City of York
- Listed buildings in York (outside the city walls, northern part)
