= The Exhibition, York =

Listed pub in York, England

The Exhibition
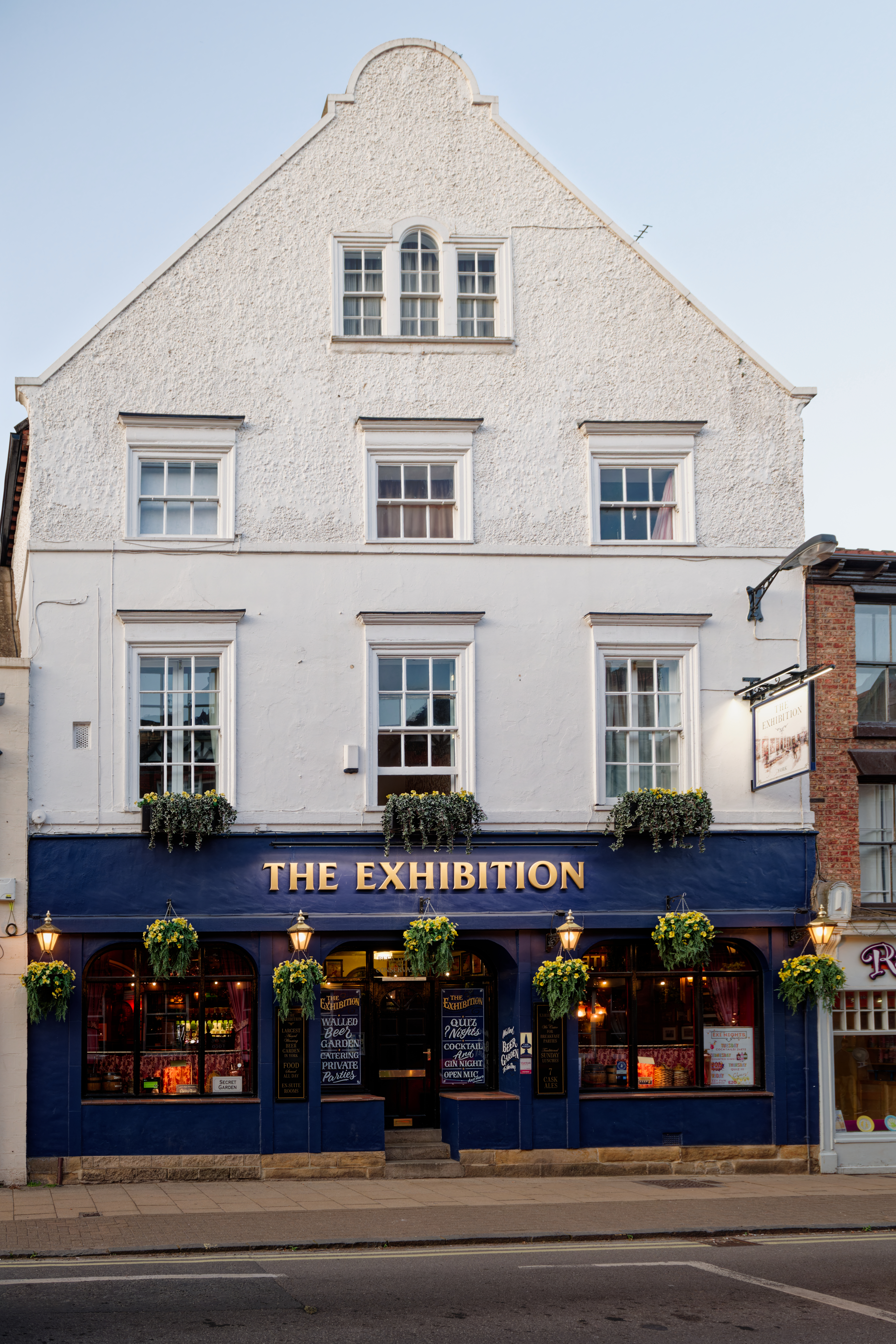
- The pub in 2023
- Former names: Churchill's Hotel; Dyson's Family and Commercial Hotel
- Alternative names: Exhibition Hotel

General information
- Type: Public house; originally a house
- Location: 19 Bootham, York, England
- Coordinates: 53.9632°N 1.0857°W
- Year built: Late 18th century
- Renovated: 20th century (extended)

Website
- exhibitionhotelyork.co.uk

Listed Building – Grade II
- Official name: Exhibition Hotel
- Designated: 24 June 1983
- Reference no.: 1259474

The Exhibition is a public house on Bootham, a street leading north from the city centre of York, England.

The building was constructed in the late 18th century as a large house. At the time, the Bird in Hand pub operated further south on the street, next to Bootham Bar. It was demolished in 1835, when the bar's barbican was pulled down, and rebuilt across the road, on the corner of St Leonard's Place. In 1879, the new pub was also demolished to make way for Exhibition Square. It then relocated to its current building, which had six or seven bedrooms, two bars, a coffee room, a sitting room, and a kitchen. It was renamed the Exhibition Hotel after the Yorkshire Fine Art Exhibition. In the 1880s, it was renamed as "Churchill's Hotel", but in 1892 it was bought by John Smith's Brewery and became the Exhibition again. In 1896, it became "Dyson's Family and Commercial Hotel", but it was still popularly known as the Exhibition, and that eventually became its official name once more. In 1967, there was a proposal to demolish the building, in order to make the city's inner ring road a dual carriageway, but the plan was soon abandoned. It was Grade II listed in 1983.

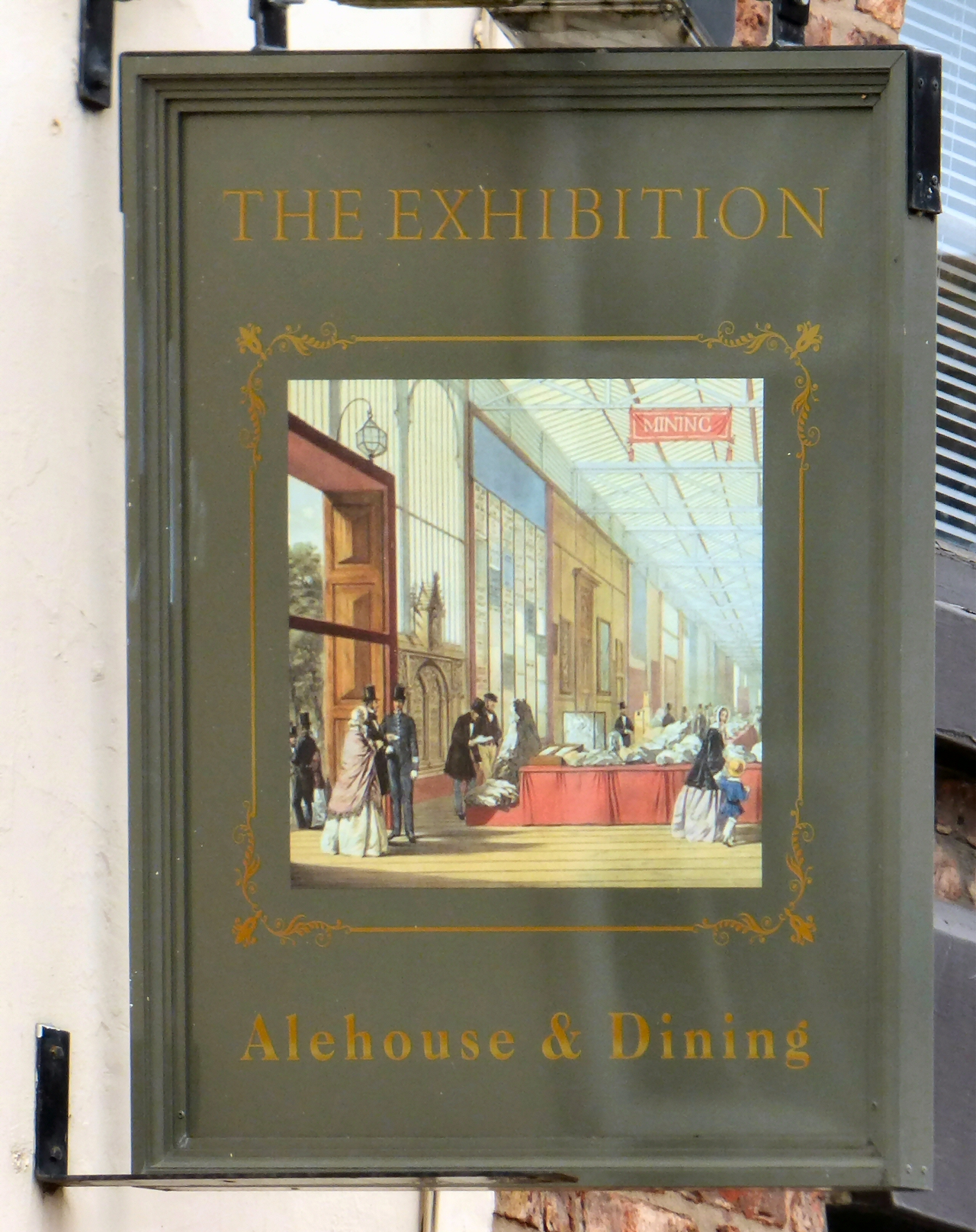
The pub sign in 2019

The building is constructed of brick, covered in roughcast painted render, and has a slate roof. It has three storeys with an attic, and is three bays wide. The ground floor has a 20th-century shopfront, while the upper floors have sash windows, and the attic has a Venetian window. The roof has its gable facing Bootham, which is topped by a decorative semi-circle. The interior of the building has been altered throughout, but it originally had the entrance to one side, the main staircase in the middle of the building, running across its width, and two rooms at the rear, separated by a passage.

== See also ==
- Listed buildings in York (outside the city walls, northern part)
