= Ivory Bangle Lady =

Skeleton from Roman York, dating to the 4th century

Coordinates: 53.9626°N 1.0933°W

- Created: 4th century AD
- Period/culture: Roman
- Discovered: 1901; Sycamore Terrace, Bootham, York, North Yorkshire
- Present location: Roman Gallery, Yorkshire Museum, York

The Ivory Bangle Lady is a skeleton found in Sycamore Terrace, York in 1901. She was a high-status adult female, potentially of North African descent, who died in York in the 4th century AD during the Roman period. Her skeleton was found with bracelets, pendants, earrings, beads as well as a glass jug and mirror. A piece of bone inscribed with the words, "Hail, sister may you live in God" was found with her skeleton.

== Background ==
The Roman Ninth Legion established a fortress at York in 71 AD. A civilian settlement grew around the military installation and in the 3rd century Eboracum was granted the status of colonia. It is estimated that Eboracum had a population of 10,000–14,500, including the civilian settlement and soldiers in the fort. This makes it of comparable size to settlements such as Londinium (London) and Corinium Dobunnorum (Cirencester) in southern England.

Roman funerary practices typically involved burials outside settlements, arranged besides the roads connecting places. Around 200 AD the custom changed from cremation to inhumation. Roman cemeteries in urban areas in Britain typically had many more male burials than female.

== Discovery ==
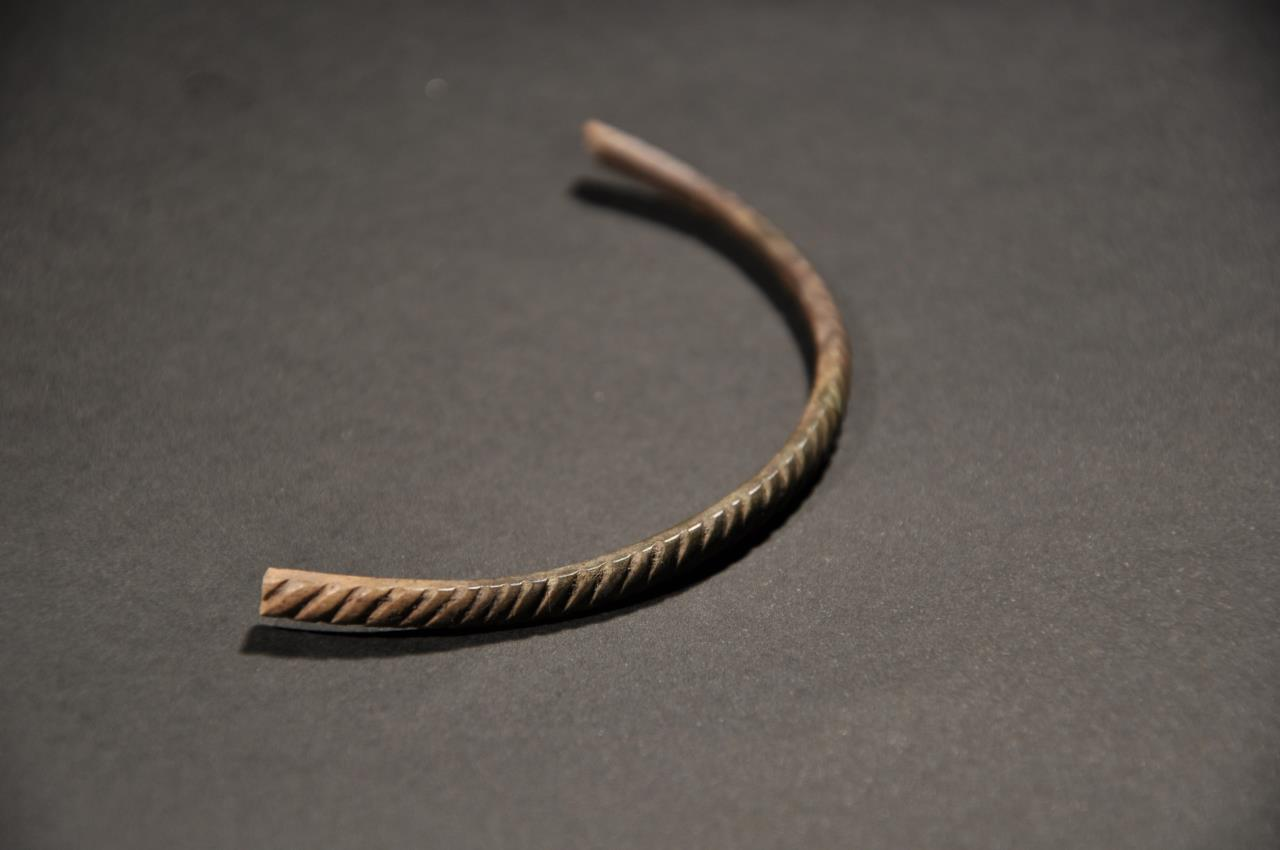
One of the ivory bangles found in the coffin

In August 1901, workers were preparing land that belonged to Edward Taylor at the north end of Sycamore Terrace for a building project. While doing so they discovered a stone coffin measuring 2.06 metres (6 ft 9 in) by 0.71 metres (2 ft 4 in) less than 0.6 metres (2 ft) below the surface. It contained the skeleton of a woman along with some grave goods and was taken to the Museum of the Yorkshire Philosophical Society in York. The museum's curator Henry Maurice Platnauer gave a talk on the discovery to the YPS in November that year, and proposed that the coffin had been left on the ground rather than buried.

== Skeletal remains ==
A 2010 research paper studied the skeletal remains of the Ivory Bangle Lady, which were found within a stone coffin. This research showed that the skeleton is of a young adult female, aged 18–23 years. Her height was calculated using regression analysis of her limb-bone length to be approximately 152–160 cm. Isotope analysis of oxygen and strontium isotopes suggest that she spent her childhood in the west of Britain or in coastal areas of Western Europe and the Mediterranean.

This research also used FORDISC to identified the Ivory Bangle Lady as having North African ancestry. This conclusion was reached following craniometric multivariate analyses, including measuring Mahalanobis distance, which suggested a strong affinity with two reference populations of African-American females from the 19th and 20th centuries. However, a 2009 study found that FORDISC 3.0 "is only likely to be useful when an unidentified specimen is more or less complete and belongs to one of the populations represented in its reference samples", and even in such "favorable circumstances it can be expected to classify no more than 1 per cent of specimens with confidence." As of 2021, genetic testing of the skeleton is underway.

== Grave goods ==
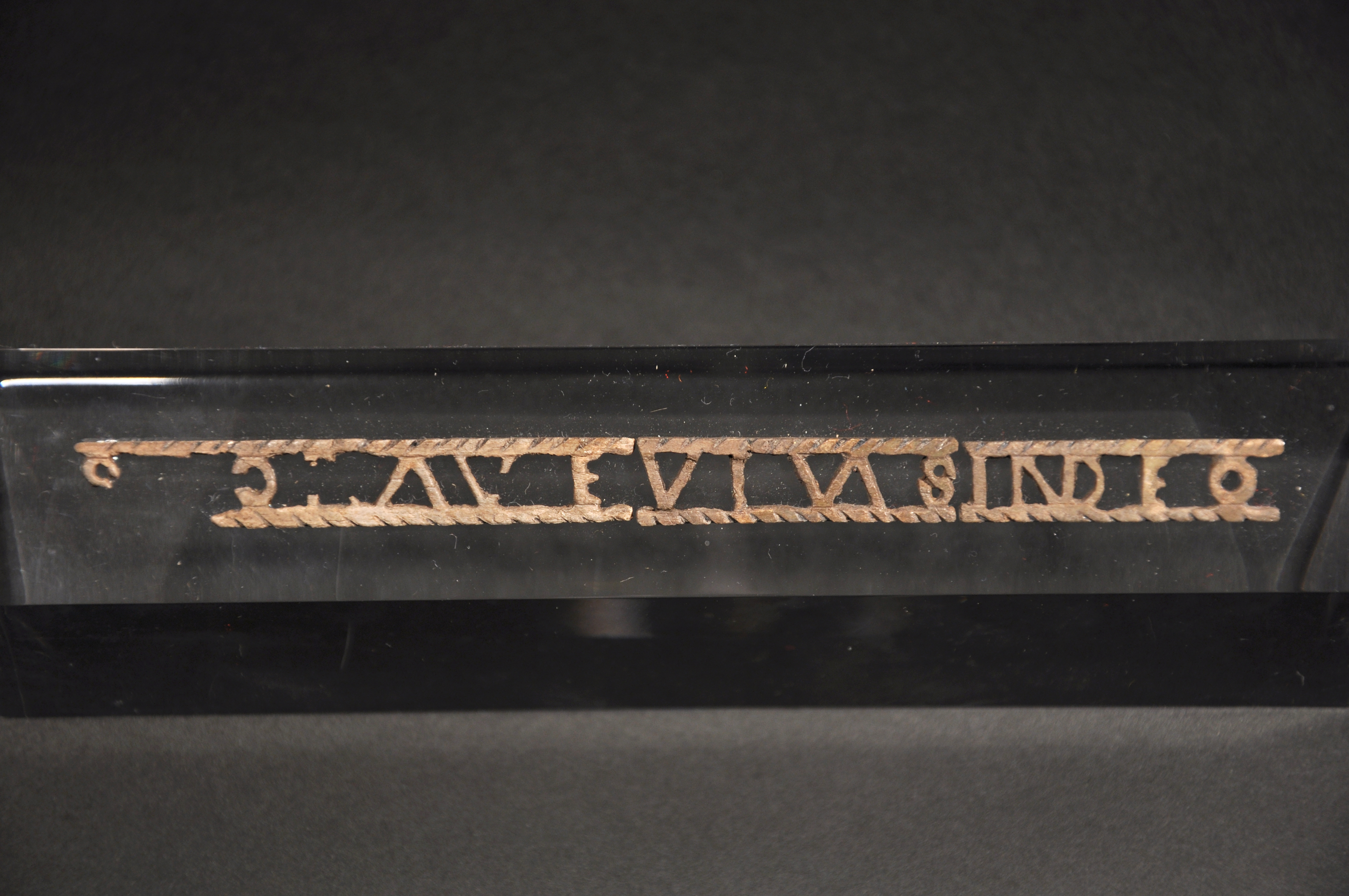
Inscribed bone plaque which when translated from Latin reads "Hail sister, may you live in God"

The Ivory Bangle Lady was buried wearing ivory and jet bangles, a bracelet of blue glass beads, silver and bronze pendants, two yellow-glass earrings. A small, round glass mirror, a dark blue glass flagon, and an openwork, ivory inscription plaque were also included in the grave. The plaque reads SOROR AVE VIVAS IN DEO ("Hail sister, may you live in God"), which is evidence for a Christian population in late Roman York. Whilst the plaque is clearly Christian, the existence of other grave goods and the alignment of the grave in a north-south (rather than east-west) arrangement strongly suggests that the lady interred was pagan, but had connections with a Christian community rather than herself being a Christian.

The grave goods found with the Ivory Bangle Lady were usually "rich and diverse" and indicate that the woman was very high status within Roman society. The assemblage has been dated to the second half of the 4th century, indicating that that is when the Ivory Bangle Lady lived.

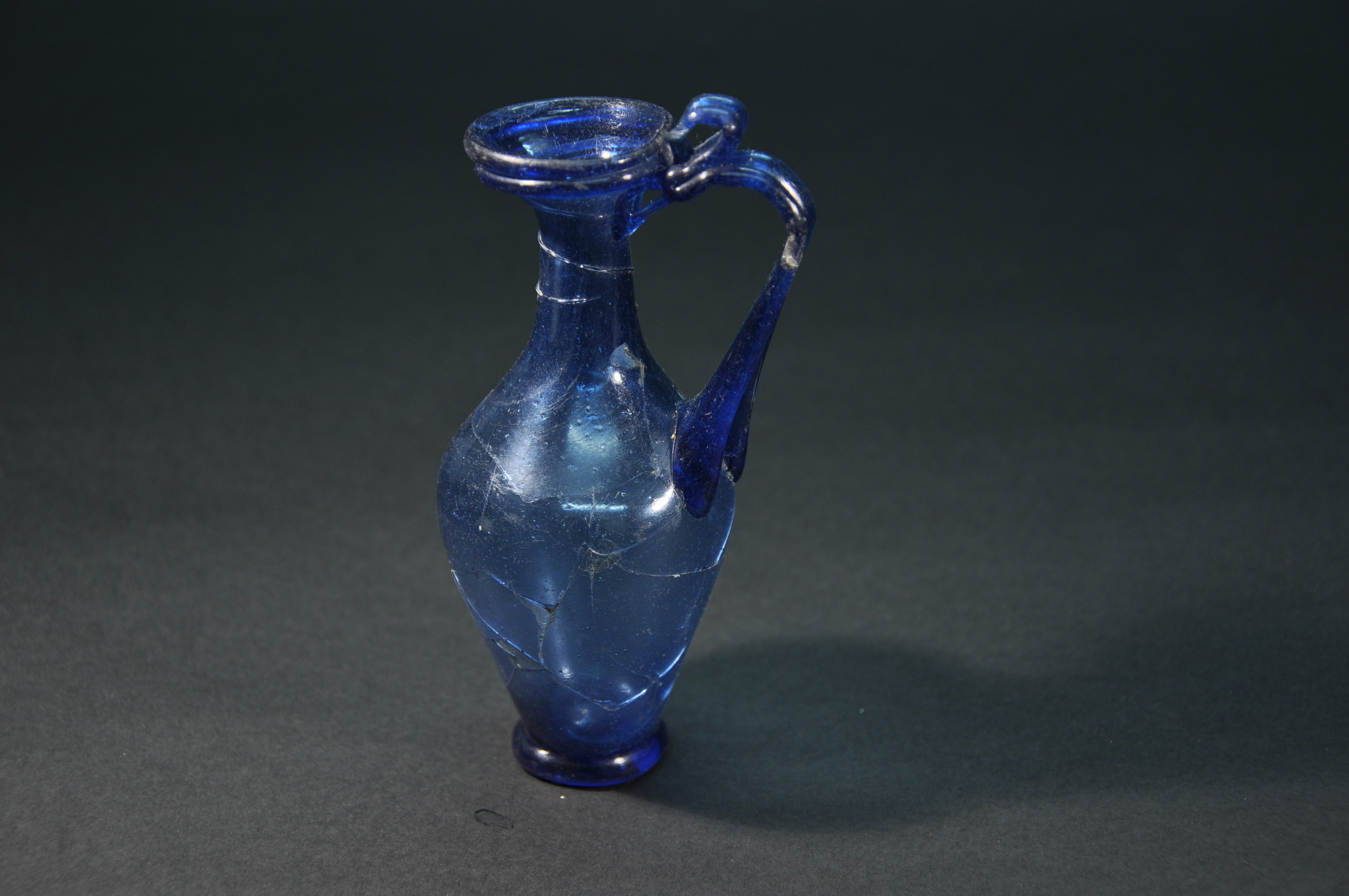
Blue glass flask

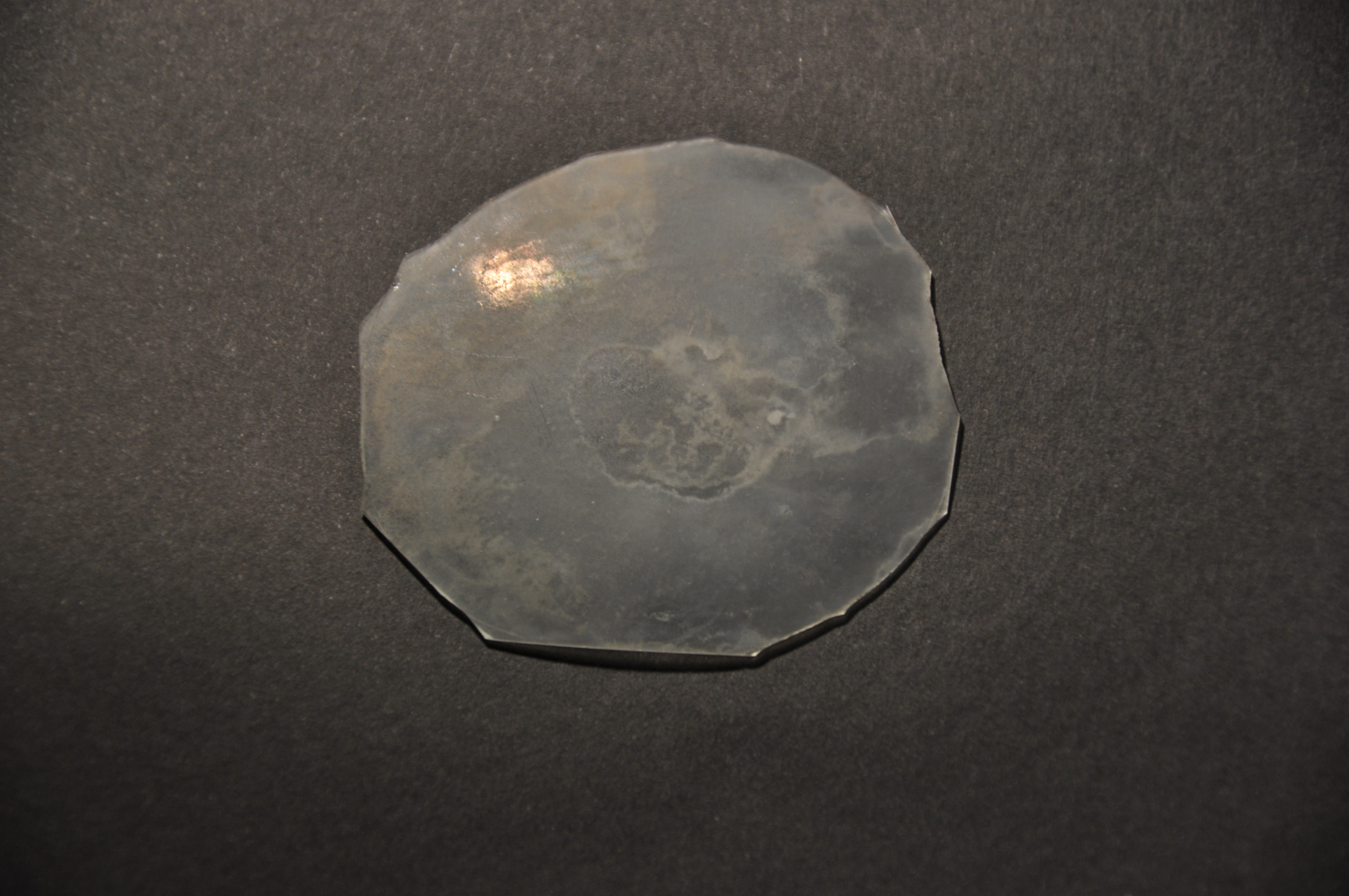
Glass mirror

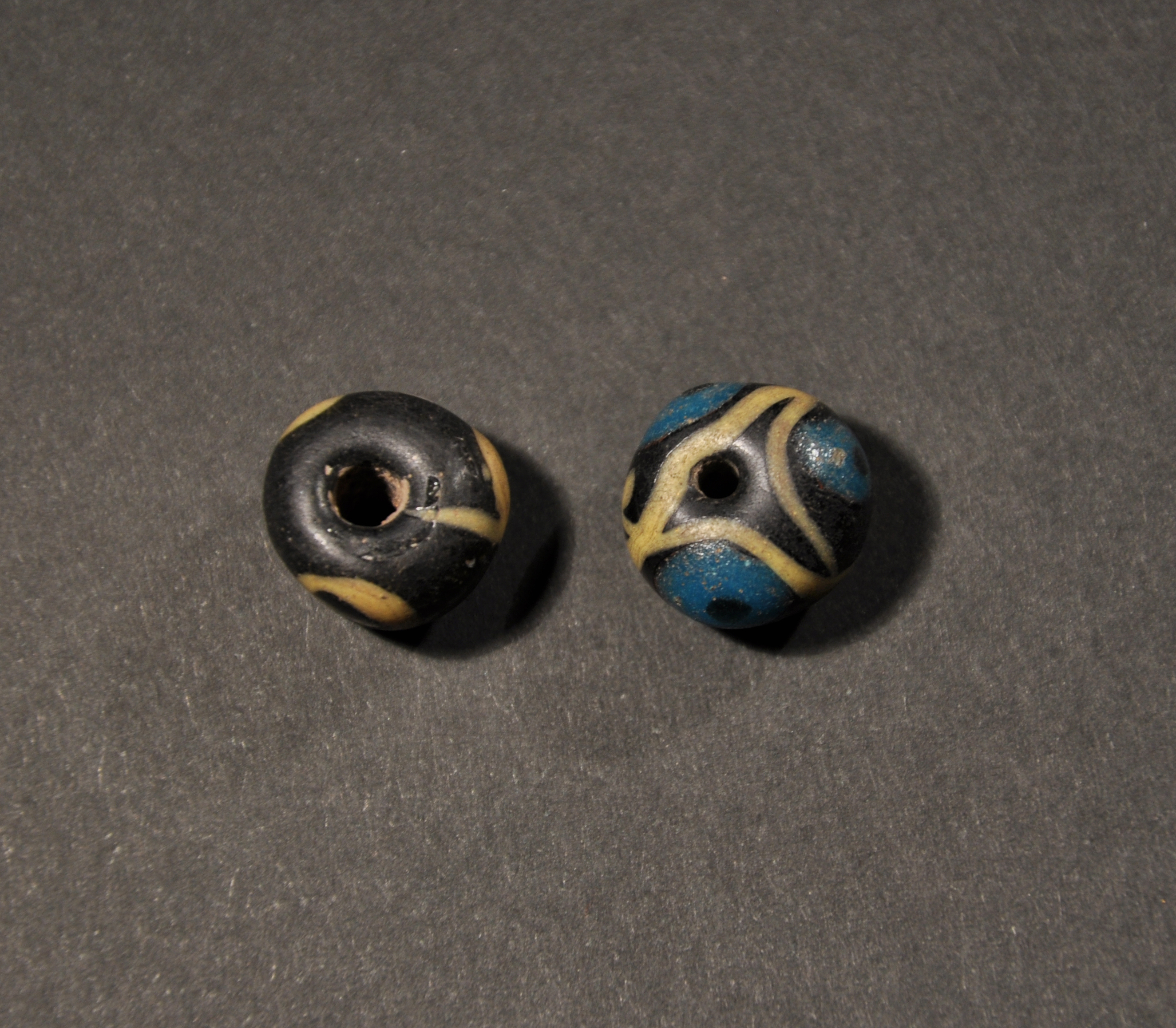
Glass beads

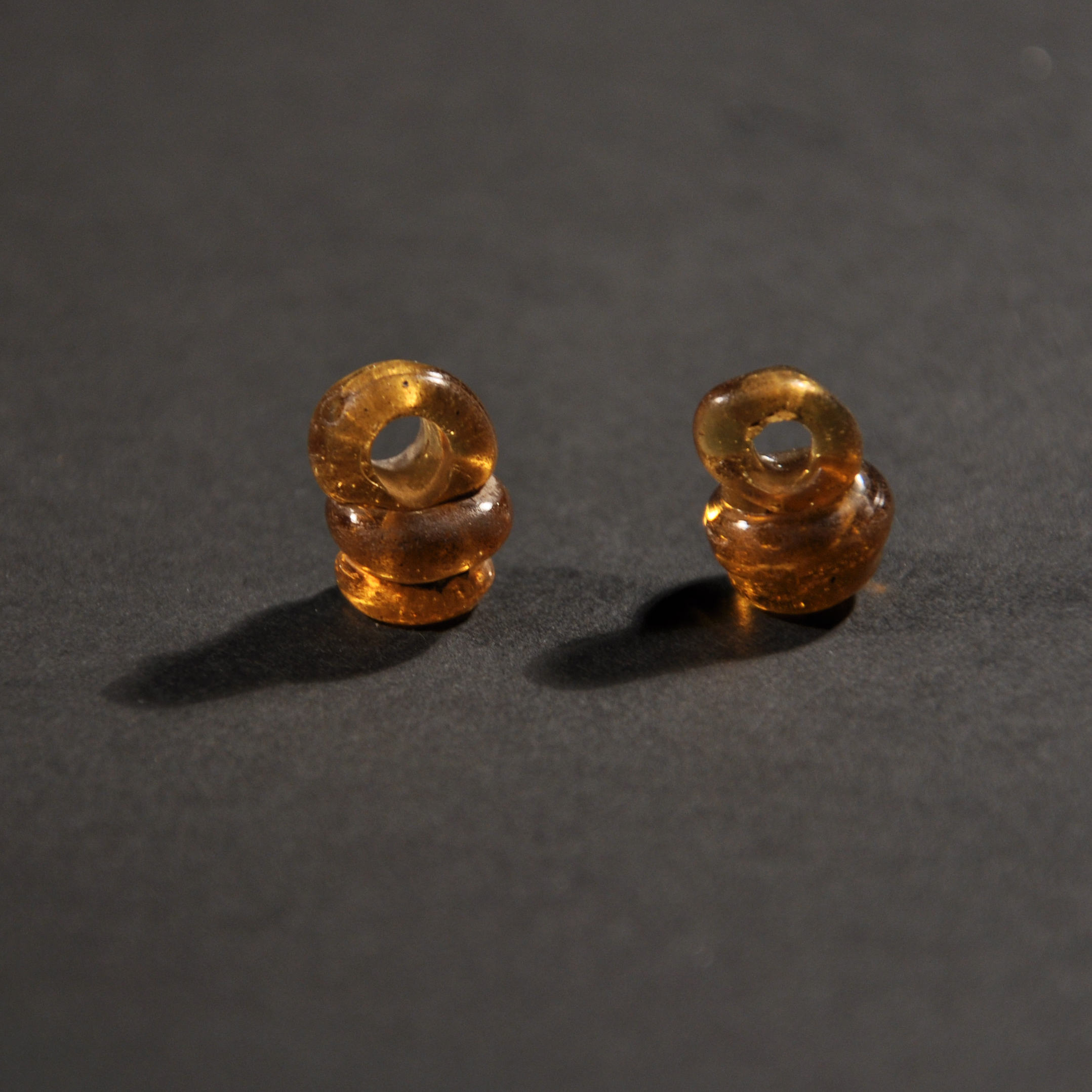
Earrings

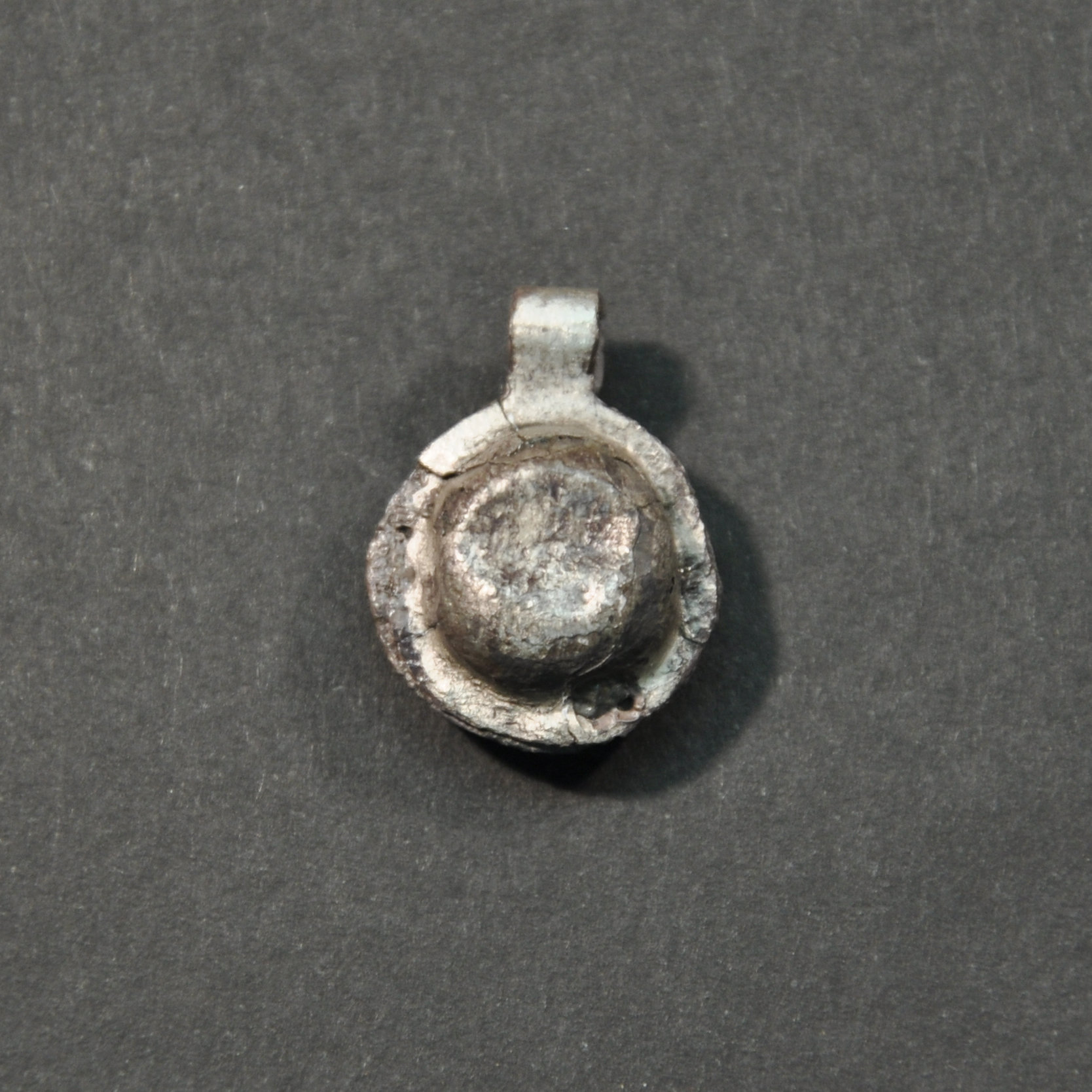
Silver pendant

== Public display and reception ==
The skeleton and grave goods are on display together in the Yorkshire Museum. In the 1980s, the grave goods were on display as part of an exhibition titled "Roman Life at the Yorkshire Museum". Since 2010 it has been on display in an exhibition title 'Roman York - Meet the People of the Empire'. The exhibition opened in August 2010 following the refurbishment of the Museum.

In 2012, the Ivory Bangle Lady was the focus of a pilot project by Heritage Sandbox which used Twitter to augment the exhibition with new content.

=== Reception ===
Immediately after the publication of this research and its discussion in the press the Ivory Bangle Lady became a focal point of a debate about immigration in the past, with public discussions focusing on her racial identity. Notably, the comments on the online publication of a Daily Mail article highlighted a backlash from readers. Emily Hanscam, in a 2019 article, compared this to the criticism aimed at Mary Beard in 2017 for defending the inclusion of a Black army officer in a BBC cartoon. On 22 October 2020 the Yorkshire Museum posted a blog post highlighting the biography of the Ivory Bangle Lady for Black History Month; this was targeted by alt-right groups who posted racist and negative comments in response to it. The Yorkshire Museum issued a statement on social media on 23 October condemning the attacks.

The biography of the Ivory Bangle Lady has been featured in several books and articles. She is featured in David Olusoga's 2017 book Black and British: A Forgotten History, as well a short film hosted by Olusoga and produced by the BBC, titled Alt History: Black British History We're Not Taught in Schools. She was featured in an online article by Vogue on '7 Remarkable black women who shaped British history', an article by The Guardian on 'Ten black history events that should be taught to every pupil', and was featured as the Museum 'Object of the Week' by the York Press in June 2020. The Ivory Bangle Lady was mentioned as a case study in a speech in the House of Commons on 8 September 2020 on the presence of black history in the current history curriculum by Theresa Villiers.

== See also ==
- Beachy Head Lady
- Updown Girl
