= Bootham =

Street and area of York, England

Coordinates: 53.9637°N 1.0869°W

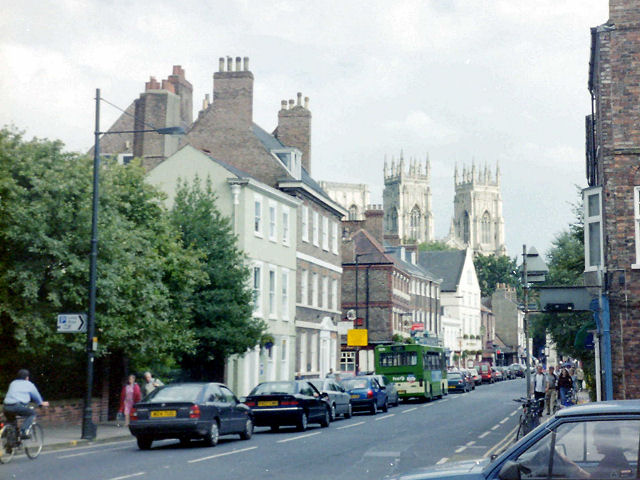
- Bootham

- Location within North Yorkshire
- OS grid reference: SE590473
- Unitary authority: City of York
- Ceremonial county: North Yorkshire
- Region: Yorkshire and the Humber
- Country: England
- Sovereign state: United Kingdom
- Post town: YORK
- Postcode district: YO30
- Dialling code: 01904
- Police: North Yorkshire
- Fire: North Yorkshire
- Ambulance: Yorkshire
- UK Parliament: York Central

Bootham is a street in the city of York, England, leading north out of the city centre. It is also the name of the small district surrounding the street.

== History ==
The street runs along a ridge of slightly higher ground east of the River Ouse. It follows the line of Dere Street, the main Roman road from Eboracum to Cataractonium. Many Roman remains have been found in the area, which were principally used for burials. The street's name probably derives from the Norse for "the place of the booths", referring to the poor huts in the area. From the Roman period, an alternative route from the bridge over the Ouse ran a short distance west of Bootham, and in the Saxon and Viking Jorvik periods, that was the main road to the north-west. However, after St Mary's Abbey was constructed in this area, that road was blocked, and Bootham became the principal route. In 1260, the abbey was given permission to construct a wall, part of which runs immediately west of the southern part of Bootham. Disputes between the abbey and the city led to conflict in 1262, with several houses on the street being burned down. Shortly after 1326 the Bootham Hoard of silver coins was deposited at the site which would become Bootham School.

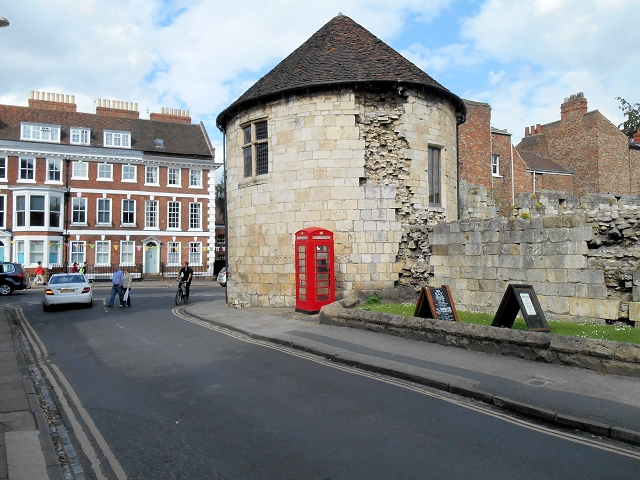
St Mary's Tower

The first documentary evidence of buildings on Bootham is from the 12th century, and by 1282, there were 19 properties on the street, most opposite the abbey wall, with some further out. The city received complaints that, by the end of the century, the road's paving was broken up, there was a stench of pigsties in the area, and that the street was often blocked by loose pigs. In 1308, the abbey was given permission to hold a market and fair on the street, and although this was later revoked, there is evidence of a market being held until at least 1448. In 1354, the abbey finally agreed that Bootham should fall within the city's jurisdiction. In 1497, St Margaret's Arch was built through part of the wall at the southern end of Bootham, providing access to what is now King's Manor.

By 1610, most of the street was built up, other than the area in front of the abbey walls, but the area was devastated in the 1644 Siege of York. Almost all the buildings now date from after the siege, many from the Georgian period, and the redevelopment included new buildings in front of the abbey wall. A cock pit was established near where the road currently has its junction with St Mary's, with an attached bowling green. In 1846, Bootham School moved to the street, and it has gradually expanded into several buildings.

York City Council describes the street as "the finest of approaches to the city bars", and mentions the trees and cobbled margins along the street, which replaced former grass verges, used for grazing animals. The street is now lined with expensive houses, hotels, and prestigious offices.

== Layout and architecture ==
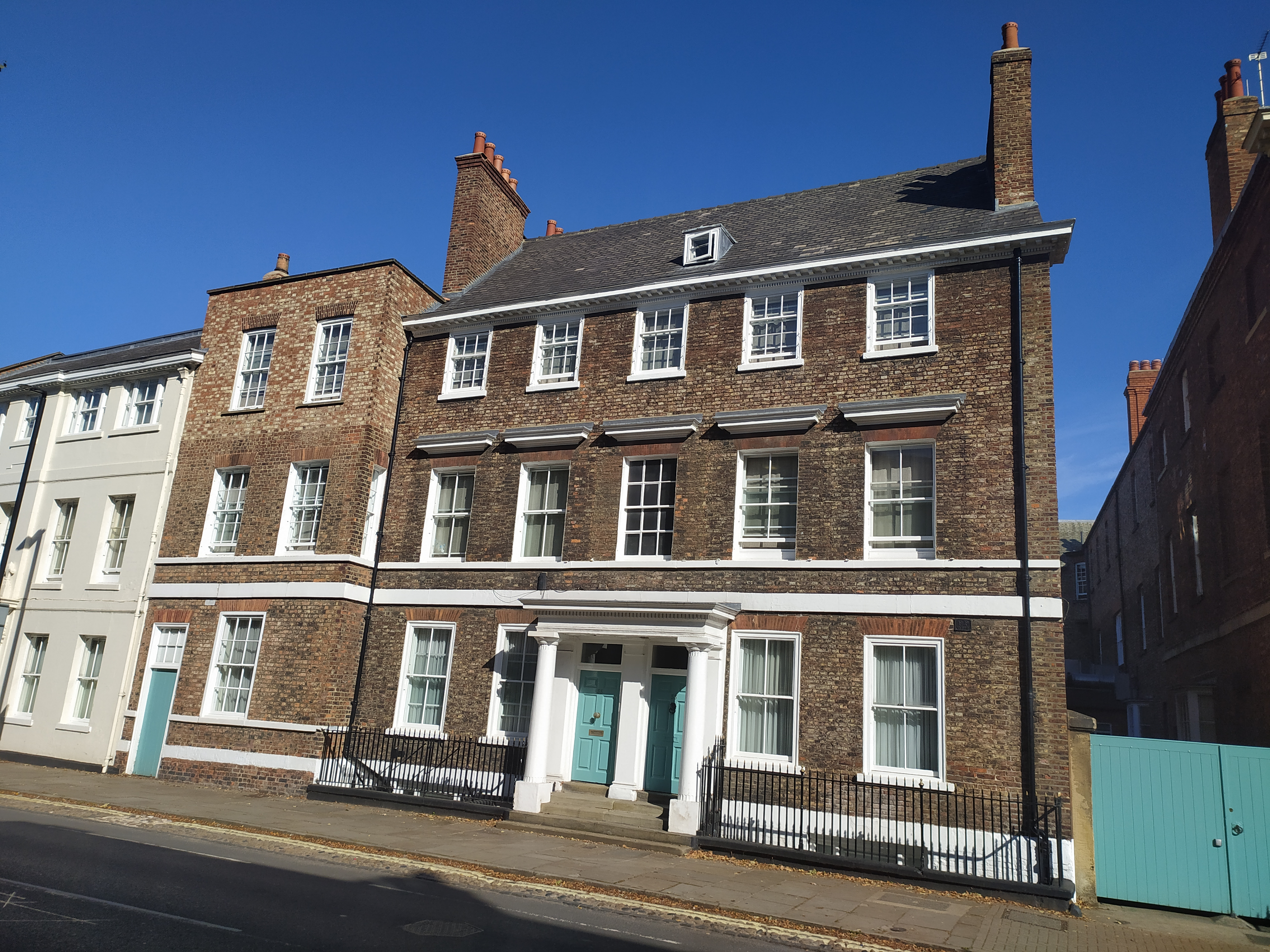
Typical Architecture of Bootham Main street

Bootham is the main route out of York city centre to the north-west, and it forms part of the A19 road. It continues the line of High Petergate, the via principalis of Roman Eboracum, from Bootham Bar in the York city walls. It follows the main Roman road from York to Catterick. It runs north-west, over the York-Scarborough railway line, ending at a junction with Bootham Crescent and Queen Anne's Road, beyond which its route become Clifton. On the south-west side, it has junctions with St Leonard's Place, Marygate, St Mary's and Bootham Terrace, while on the north-east side, it meets Gillygate, Bootham Row, and Grosvenor Terrace.

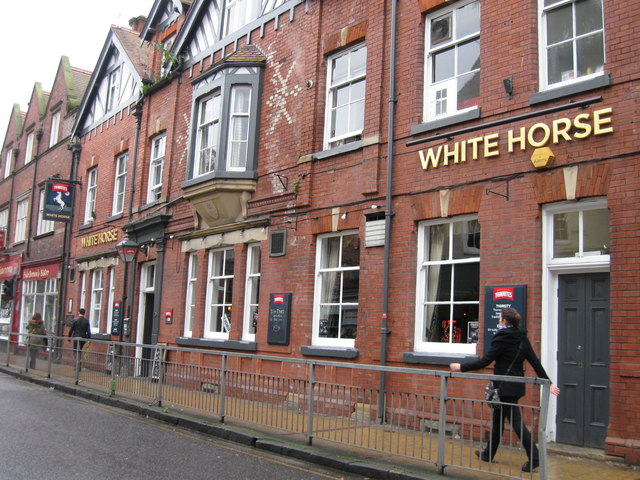
White Horse public house

Notable buildings on its south-west side include the walls surrounding St Mary's Abbey, with Queen Margaret's Arch and St Mary's Tower; Ingram House, almshouses built about 1632, one of the few survivors of the siege; 8–10 Bootham, built in the 18th century; and 54 Bootham, and Bootham Lodge, large houses built about 1840. On the north-east side lie most of the Georgian buildings: 15–17, The Exhibition pub, 25, 33, 39–45, 47 (designed by John Carr), 51, 53 and 55, 57, 59, 61, and 75–77 Bootham are all large houses, dating from the 18th century. 21 and 23, 35, and 49 Bootham are slightly older, with 17th-century origins. Other notable buildings include Wandesford House, almshouses opened in 1743; and The Churchill Hotel, built about 1827. The main entrance to Bootham Park Hospital, built in 1777 as one of the first asylums in the UK, is a long drive from the street.

== See also ==
- Bootham Crescent, the former home stadium of York City Football Club, in the Bootham area
- Ivory Bangle Lady, a Roman-era burial found in the Bootham area
