= Warthill =

Village and civil parish in North Yorkshire, England

Coordinates: 53.9913°N 0.9695°W

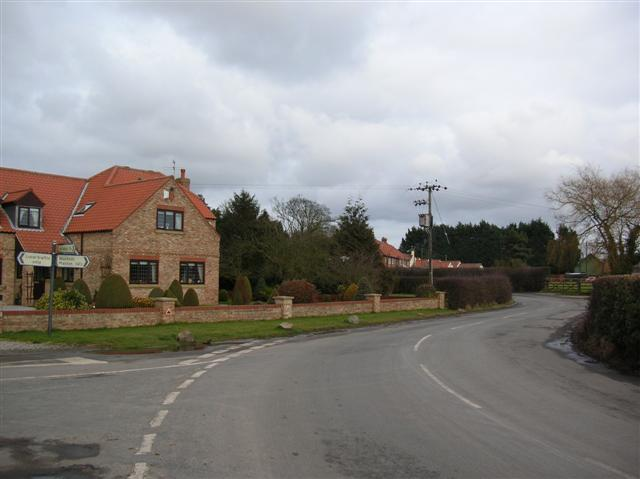
- Warthill

- Location within North Yorkshire
- Population: 240 (2011 census for Warthill Parish)
- OS grid reference: SE675555
- Unitary authority: North Yorkshire
- Ceremonial county: North Yorkshire
- Region: Yorkshire and the Humber
- Country: England
- Sovereign state: United Kingdom
- Post town: YORK
- Postcode district: YO19
- Dialling code: 01904
- Police: North Yorkshire
- Fire: North Yorkshire
- Ambulance: Yorkshire
- UK Parliament: Thirsk and Malton

Warthill is a village and civil parish in North Yorkshire, England, six miles north-east of York and 14 miles south-west of Malton.

The name Warthill probably derives from the Old English weardhyll meaning 'watching hill', i.e. a hill used by watchmen. Alternatively, the first element may derive from the Old Norse varða meaning 'cairn'.

The village has one public house, The Agar Arms, and a Church of England primary school (established in 1863), with about forty pupils.

Warthill is home to St Mary's Church, which was built in the 19th century and is a good example of Victorian Gothic architecture.

Brockfield Hall, a Georgian house completed in 1807, is situated nearby. It was built for Benjamin Agar by Peter Atkinson senior who worked in the office of John Carr (architect). Brockfield has an oval entry hall with cantilevered staircase. The house displays fine art and furniture, and mementos associated with the Fitzalan Howard family. There is also an unusual collection of glass walking sticks.

The house is rectangular in plan, with a hipped slate roof. The most immediately noticeable feature is a large Venetian window on the first floor which is set in a semi-circular arch of stone panels. Below is an ironwork balcony with stands above the entry porch. The interior serves partly as a display space for paintings by the Staithes group of artists.

The hall is now designated as a Grade II* listed building.

The village was part of the Ryedale district between 1974 and 2023. It is now administered by North Yorkshire Council.

== Railway ==
Warthill was served by Warthill railway station which was on the York to Beverley Line between 1847 and 1959.

== See also ==
- Listed buildings in Warthill
