= Beachy Head Lady =

Skeleton of a woman from Roman Sussex, dating to the 3rd century

- Discovered: c. 1950s Beachy Head, East Sussex, England
- Present location: Eastbourne Museums
- Identification: MES33810
- Period: 2nd or 3rd century AD (Roman)

The Beachy Head Lady or Beachy Head Woman is an ancient woman whose skeleton was discovered at Beachy Head, East Sussex, England. The Beachy Head Lady lived during the Roman period, likely in the timeframe of 129 to 311 AD. As new techniques have been applied to the remains their interpretation has changed, with an initial proposal of sub-Saharan ancestry supplanted by genetic analysis indicating close similarity to Roman period individuals from southern Britain and Northern Europe.

== Remains and investigation ==
As part of the Eastbourne Ancestors project, over 300 sets of excavated human remains excavated were re-examined in 2012. Heritage Officer Jo Seaman and his team found two boxes at Eastbourne Town Hall labelled "Beachy Head, something to do with 1956 or 1959". Inside was a very well-preserved human skeleton. The Beachy Head Lady is the most complete skeleton in the collection.

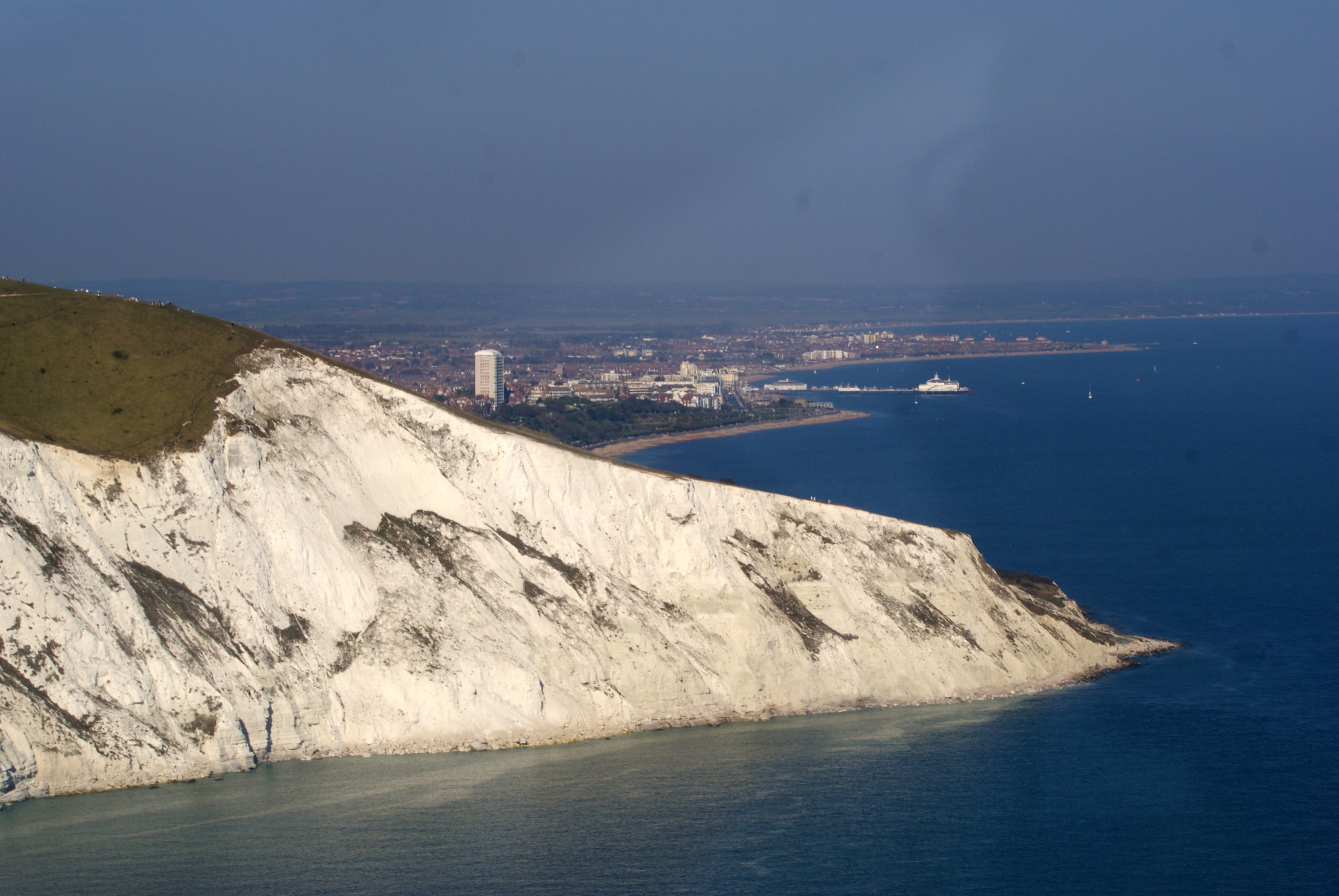
Beachy Head where the remains were originally discovered in the 1950s.

Examination revealed that Beachy Head Lady was aged around 22 to 25 when she died, and was between 4 feet 9 inches and 5 feet 1 inch (1.45 m and 1.55 m) tall. Radiocarbon dating suggested a date range of 129 to 311 AD for the remains, and isotope analysis indicated that the Beachy Head Lady was born and grew up in south-east England.

Initially, the forensic analysis of the skull led to an assessment that the woman had originated from Sub-Saharan Africa, leading to claims that she was the earliest known person of Black African origin in Britain. This was undermined in 2023 by analysis of a partial DNA sample which placed her ancestry in Southern Europe. In 2025, mitochondrial DNA analysis on the skeleton using modern techniques showed the Beachy Head Lady's mitochondrial DNA belonged to the K1a26 subclade of haplogroup K1a, which is common among present-day populations in Northern Europe and the British Isles and has also been found in Iron Age individuals from rural Britain, that is most similar to other individuals from the local population of Roman-era Britain.

== Public display and reception ==
The remains were exhibited to the public for the first time at the Eastbourne Redoubt in 2014. In 2021, the remains were moved to the newly-refurbished "Beachy Head Story" visitor centre, closer to where they were found. The results of the DNA test published in 2023 led to the removal of a plaque commemorating her as “the first black Briton."

== See also ==
- Eastbourne#Roman era
- Ivory Bangle Lady
