= Bootham Lodge =

Listed building in York, England

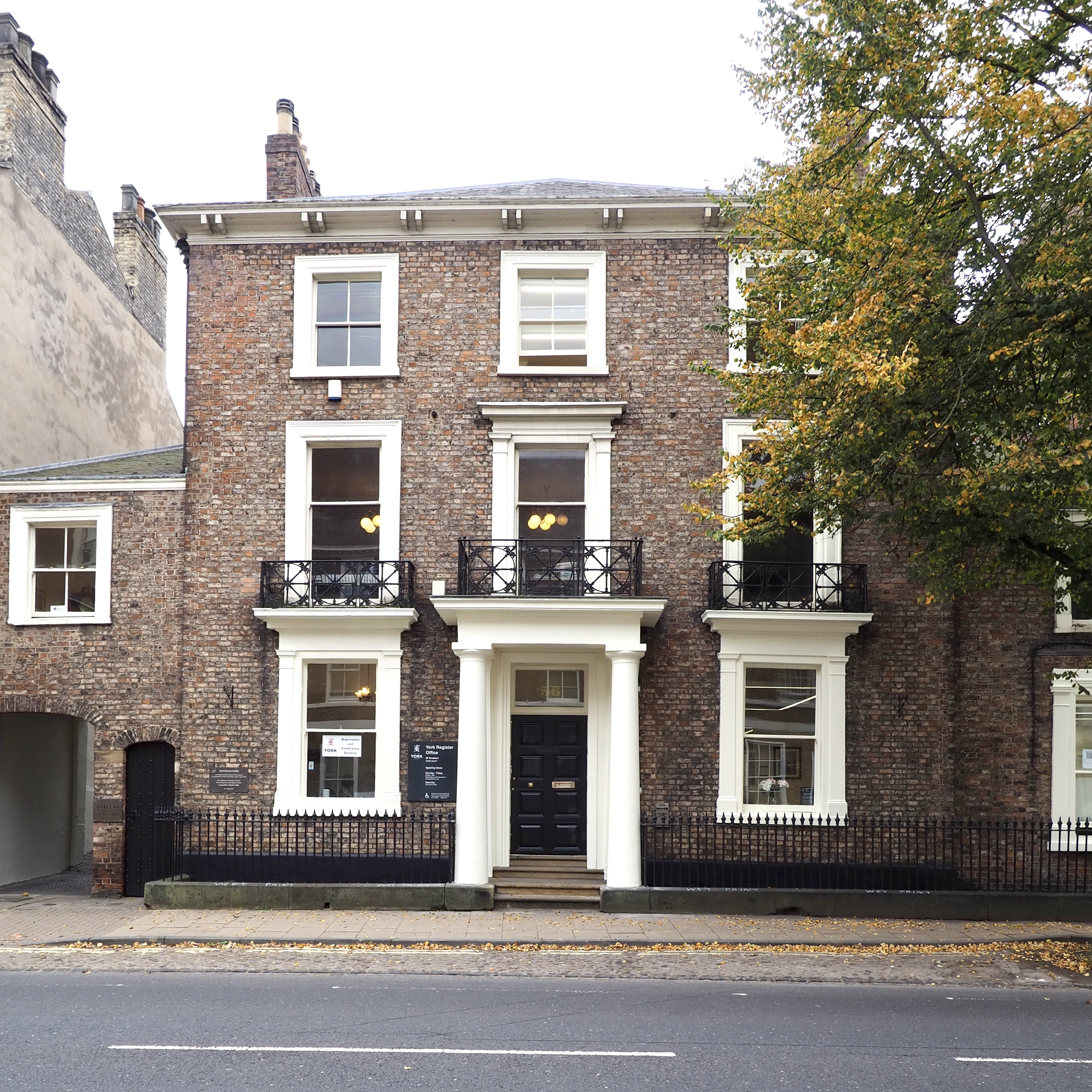
- The building in 2023

- Location within York City Centre

General information
- Status: Converted to register office and offices
- Type: House (former)
- Location: 56 Bootham, York, England
- Coordinates: 53.96419°N 1.08817°W
- Year built: 1840–1845
- Client: Thomas Walker
- Owner: York Conservation Trust

Listed Building – Grade II
- Official name: Bootham Lodge and attached railings
- Designated: 14 June 1954
- Reference no.: 1259437

Bootham Lodge is a historic building, lying on Bootham, immediately north of the city centre of York, England.

The building was constructed as a house, with work starting in 1840, and completed in 1845. It was built for Thomas Walker, a local solicitor, at the same time as its similar neighbour, 54 Bootham. Its original kitchen was in the basement, but a new kitchen was added at the rear soon after the building was constructed.

In the 20th century, the building was converted to offices, and for many years it served as the headquarters of the Flaxton Rural District, then of the Ryedale district, also housing its council chamber. It was later taken over by York City Council, to house its office for births, deaths and marriages. In 2003, it was purchased by the York Conservation Trust and renovated, to become the city's register office. A new extension was added at the rear, to serve as a wedding room, with French doors leading into the newly landscaped garden, designed to act as a backdrop for wedding photography. The upper floors are leased out, separately from the ground, as offices.

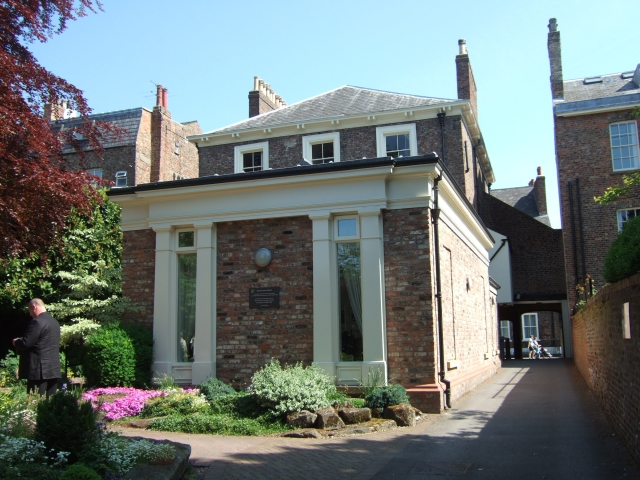
Rear of the building, showing the marriage room

The three-storey building is built of brick, broadly in the typical style of a Victorian villa. There are single-storey wings to the left and right of the building, the one to the left containing a carriage entrance. Its main entrance is under a porch, in the Tuscan order, which supports a balcony, with an iron balustrade manufactured by the local John Walker foundry. The railings in front of the building are original, and also by John Walker, with heads in an organic style.

Inside, there is a central hall, with a large fireplace, moved from the first floor. There are two staircases, each with iron balusters and mahogany handrails. The fireplaces and plasterwork were designed by Francis Wostenholme.

The building and its railings were Grade II listed in 1954.

== See also ==
- Listed buildings in York (outside the city walls, northern part)
