= Bootham School =

Independent school in York, England

Coordinates: 53°57′53″N 1°05′13″W

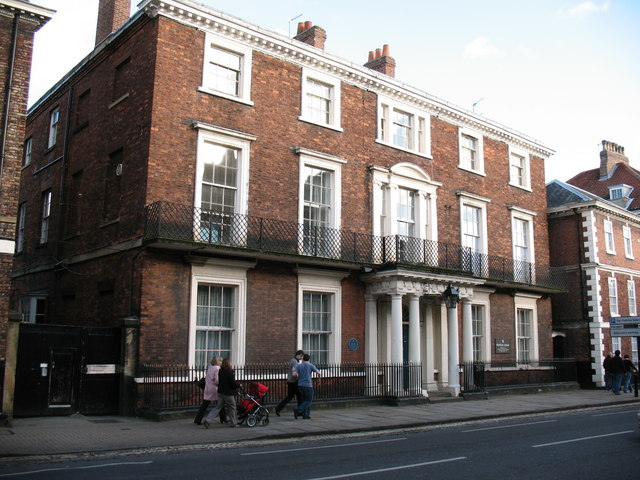
- Bootham School, Bootham, York. The main building was originally built in 1804 for Sir Richard Vanden Bempde Johnstone.

Location
- Bootham; York, North Yorkshire, YO30 7BU; England

Information
- Type: Private school
- Motto: Membra sumus corporis magni (We are members of a greater body)
- Religious affiliations: Religious Society of Friends (Quaker)
- Established: 6 January 1823; 203 years ago
- Founder: Religious Society of Friends (Quakers)
- Department for Education URN: 121722 Tables
- Headmaster: Deneal Smith
- Deputy Head: James Ratcliffe
- Gender: Mixed
- Age: 3 to 19
- Enrolment: 605 as of January 2016
- Houses: Firbank; Pendle; Brigflatts; Swarthmore
- Publication: Bootham Magazine
- Boarding Houses: Rowntree; Fox; Evelyn
- Former Pupils: Bootham Old Scholars Association
- Website: www.boothamschool.com

Bootham School is a private Quaker boarding school, on Bootham in the city of York in England. It accepts boys and girls ages 3–19 and had an enrolment of 605 pupils in 2016. It is one of seven Quaker schools in England.

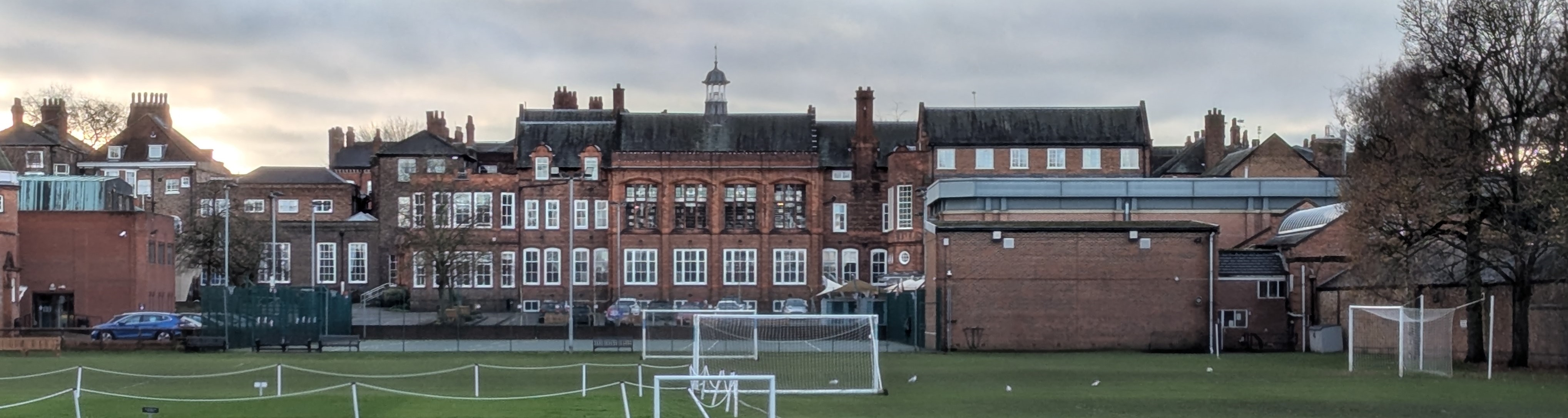
Rear view of the school

The school was founded by the Religious Society of Friends (Quakers) and opened on 6 January 1823 in Lawrence Street, York. Its first headmaster was William Simpson (1823–1828). He was followed by John Ford (1828–c. 1865). The school is now on Bootham, near York Minster. It is based in 51 Bootham, a building originally built in 1804 for Sir Richard Vanden Bempde Johnstone, but has expanded into several neighbouring buildings.

The school's motto Membra Sumus Corporis Magni means "We are members of a greater body", quoting Seneca the Younger (Epistle 95, 52).

== Academics ==
Bootham was ranked at 43rd in the 2011 Independent Schools A-Levels League Tables.

== Notable alumni ==
Notable former pupils include the 19th-century parliamentary leader John Bright, the mathematician Lewis Fry Richardson ("father of fractals"), the physicist and electrical engineer Silvanus P. Thompson, the historian A. J. P. Taylor, the actor-manager Brian Rix, the applied linguist Stephen Pit Corder, the child psychiatrist Sir Michael Rutter, the social reformer Seebohm Rowntree, the 1959 Nobel Peace Prize winner Philip Noel-Baker, Cabinet Secretary Sir Jeremy Heywood, singer-songwriter Benjamin Francis Leftwich, the chief executive of Marks & Spencer Stuart Rose and Jon Ingle, better known as drag artist Lady Bunny.

== See also ==
- List of Friends Schools
