= Peter Atkinson (architect, born 1735) =

- Born: 1735; Ripon, North Yorkshire, England
- Died: 1805 (aged 69–70)
- Occupation: Architect
- Projects: Blake Street; Wortley Hall; South Ormsby; Harewood House

Peter Atkinson (1735–1805) was an English architect.

== Biography ==
He was born at or near Ripon and started work as a carpenter. He later became an assistant to John Carr and was employed at Buxton, Harewood and elsewhere. In 1786 he became responsible for maintaining York's corporation property, and subsequently took over Carr's extensive works in Yorkshire and further north.

The Atkinson family of York architects continued after Atkinson's death. His son, Peter, himself had sons John Bownas Atkinson (1807–1874) and William Atkinson (architect, born 1811).

Before their father's death, the two sons had taken over and for the next thirty plus years they were the most prolific of the city's architects. In 1877 William took James Demaisne (1842–1911) as partner.

=== Works ===
Among Atkinson's works were:

- No. 18 Blake Street, York, c. 1789
- Monk Bridge, York, 1794 (later widened in 1924–26)
- Hackness Hall, 1797, a large mansion for Sir R.V.B. Johnstone at Hackness (near Scarborough). In 1910 the building was gutted by fire, but was subsequently restored by Walter Brierley
- Hainton Hall, Lincolnshire, rebuilt the west front for George Heneage in 1800
- A stable block at Wortley Hall, West Riding of Yorkshire, for Earl of Wharncliffe c.1800
- Enlargement of the Female Prison in York Castle by adding the end bays to match John Carr's Assize Courts, 1802 (the Female Prison is now part of York Castle Museum)
- Additions at Ormsby Hall, South Ormsby, Lincolnshire, for Charles Burrell Massingberd, 1803
- York, 51 Bootham, for Sir R. V. B. Johnstone, now a school, 1803
- Gateway and farm buildings at Harewood House, West Riding, for the 1st Earl of Harewood, c. 1803
- Brockfield Hall, Warthill, North Riding of Yorkshire, for Benjamin Agar, 1804–7
