= Grays Court, York =

Grade I listed building in York, England

Grays Court
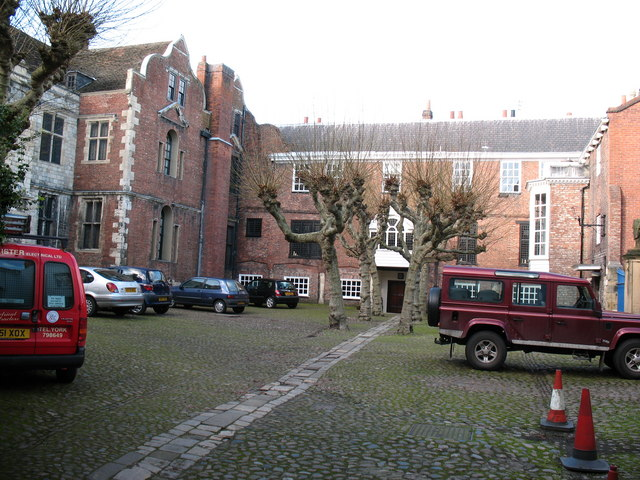
- Gray's Court courtyard at the rear of the Treasurer's House, with the red-brick building of Gray's Court facing the camera

- Location within York Central

General information
- Type: Historic house; hotel
- Location: Minster Yard, York, England
- Coordinates: 53.9633°N 1.0807°W
- Construction started: 1080 (earliest parts)
- Renovated: c. 1742 (extended); 1845–46 (extended and altered) c. 1900 (restored, remodelled and extended); 1902 (garden gates and railings)
- Owner: Private (since 2005)

Website
- grayscourtyork.com

Listed Building – Grade I
- Official name: Grays Court and garden gates and piers attached to south east corner
- Designated: 14 June 1954
- Reference no.: 1257248

Grays Court is a Grade I listed house on Minster Yard in York, England. The house is within the city walls near York Minster. Dating back in part to 1080 and commissioned by the first Norman Archbishop of York to provide the official residence for the treasurers of York Minster, it is one of the oldest continuously occupied dwellings in the United Kingdom.

== History ==
The house was surrendered to the Crown on 26 May 1547 and William Cliffe, the last of the medieval treasurers, was made dean of Chester. The first post-Reformation owner was Edward Seymour, Duke of Somerset. He was given the house in 1547 by Edward VI, the son of Henry VIII.

The Sterne Room was built in mid-18th century for Jaques Sterne, Precentor and Canon Residentiary of the Minster and uncle of Laurence Sterne. The marble plaque on the fireplace is of Augusta, Princess of Wales, the mother of King George III.

The house became "Gray's Court" when William and Faith Gray moved into the house in Minster Yard in 1788. Life at the house was recorded by Faith Gray who was a keen diarist but she also worked, with Catharine Cappe et al, to establish a school for poor girls. She helped transform the Grey (now Blue) Coat School and she started a Friendly Society. Faith died at Gray's Court on Boxing Day in 1826.

The 300-metre (980 ft) stretch of the city walls which bounds Grays Court was donated to the city in 1878 by Edwin Gray (c. 1847–1929), the Lord Mayor of York. His wife, Almyra Gray wrote a history of her family in this building Papers and diaries of a York family 1764–1839. The book includes details of the family. Almyra died here in 1939. Composer Alan Gray (1855–1935), was the brother of Edwin Gray and grew up in the house. On 14 June 1954, Grays Court was designated a Grade I listed building. It has been privately owned since 2005, and is now a hotel.

== See also ==
- Grade I listed buildings in the City of York
- Listed buildings in York (within the city walls, northern part)
