= Friendly society brasses =

Friendly society brasses were the emblems of village friendly societies or clubs common in the west of England between the late 18th and early 20th centuries. The use of brasses as emblems was particularly prevalent in Somerset and the surrounding counties.

== Use ==
On the society's annual feast day or walking day, usually in spring, the members would hold a parade around the village, with the officers or sometimes all the members carrying poles or staves between four and eight feet (1.2 to 2.4 meters) in length and usually painted. Some poles (also known as rods, wands or 'club sticks') were headed by garlands of flowers, while in the West Country, the poles were commonly headed by a brass finial with a distinctive shape and decorated with ribbons.

It is thought that the use of brass was due to the proximity of the brass industries in Bristol and Bridgwater, and the two separate manufacturing centres may account for there being two principal forms of brass pole-head. Those used north and east of a line drawn between Bridgwater and Yeovil were generally flat and cut from sheet brass, while those south and west of the line were more three-dimensional. The flat Brasses most commonly took the form of an elaborate spear-head or a fleur-de-lis, while the three-dimensional forms were cast and based on a ball or column shape.

There was often a symbolic element in a brass emblem. For example, the addition of a crown could indicate loyalty to the monarchy, while an acorn or oak leaves indicated strength or longevity. Other symbols include clasped hands or two figures shaking hands indicating friendship and community, religious symbols such as anchors or the Agnus Dei, and horseshoes. Some Brasses may replicate the sign of the inn where the Society met.

== Stave dances ==
Stave dances may have been dances performed after the procession, with the dancers carrying and using the staves with their brass heads in the course of the dance, for example to form arches or stars. There are few records of the dances themselves, but some from Somerset, and from Stourton Caundle and Fifehead Magdalen in Dorset, have been found. Some modern-day Morris dance groups have revived stave dancing, for example 'Somerset Morris' based near Bristol, and the 'Mendip Stave Dancers' from Oakhill in Somerset.

== Gallery ==
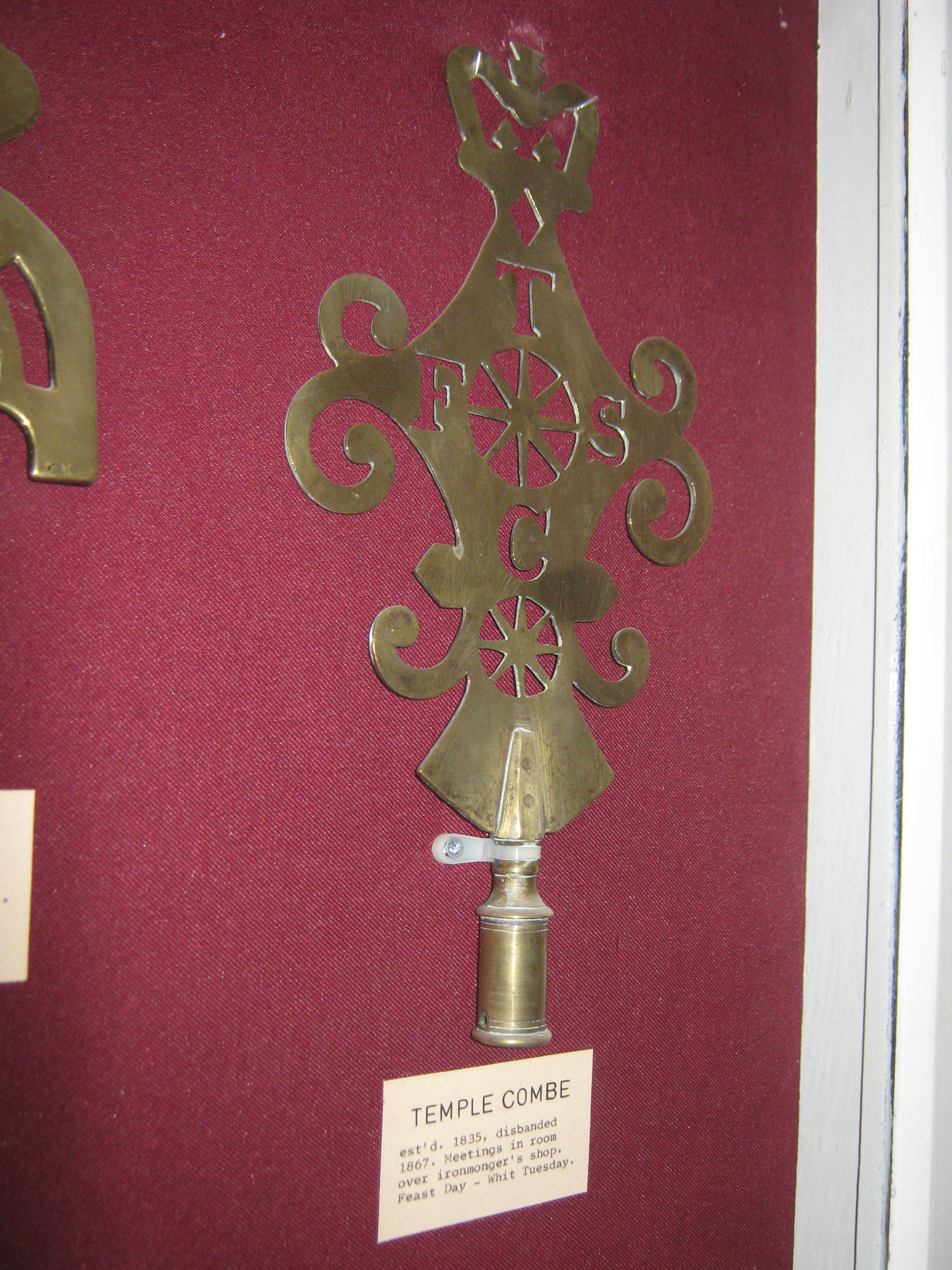
Templecombe Friendly Society Brass on display in Wells and Mendip Museum

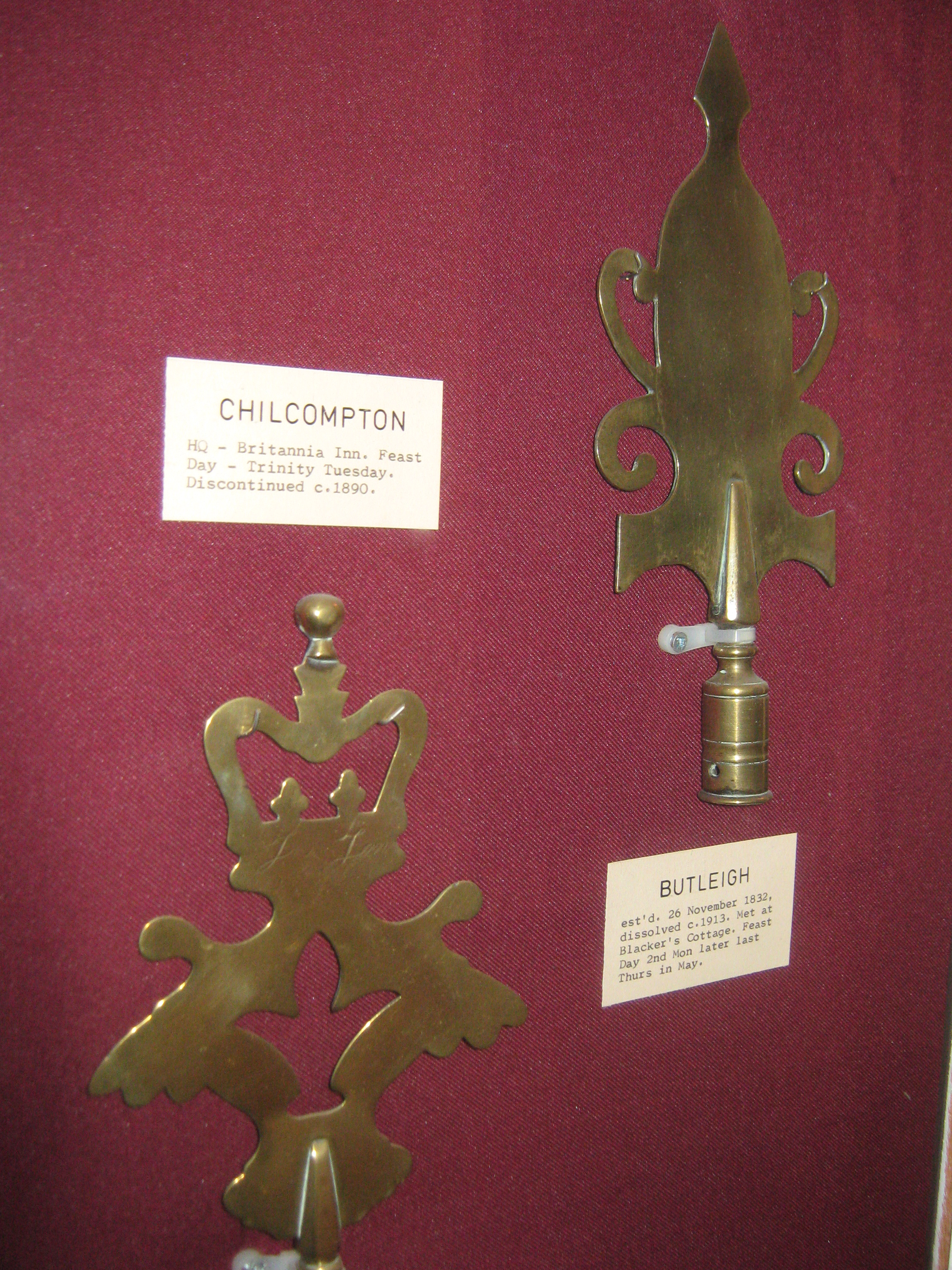
Chilcompton and Butleigh Friendly Societies Brasses

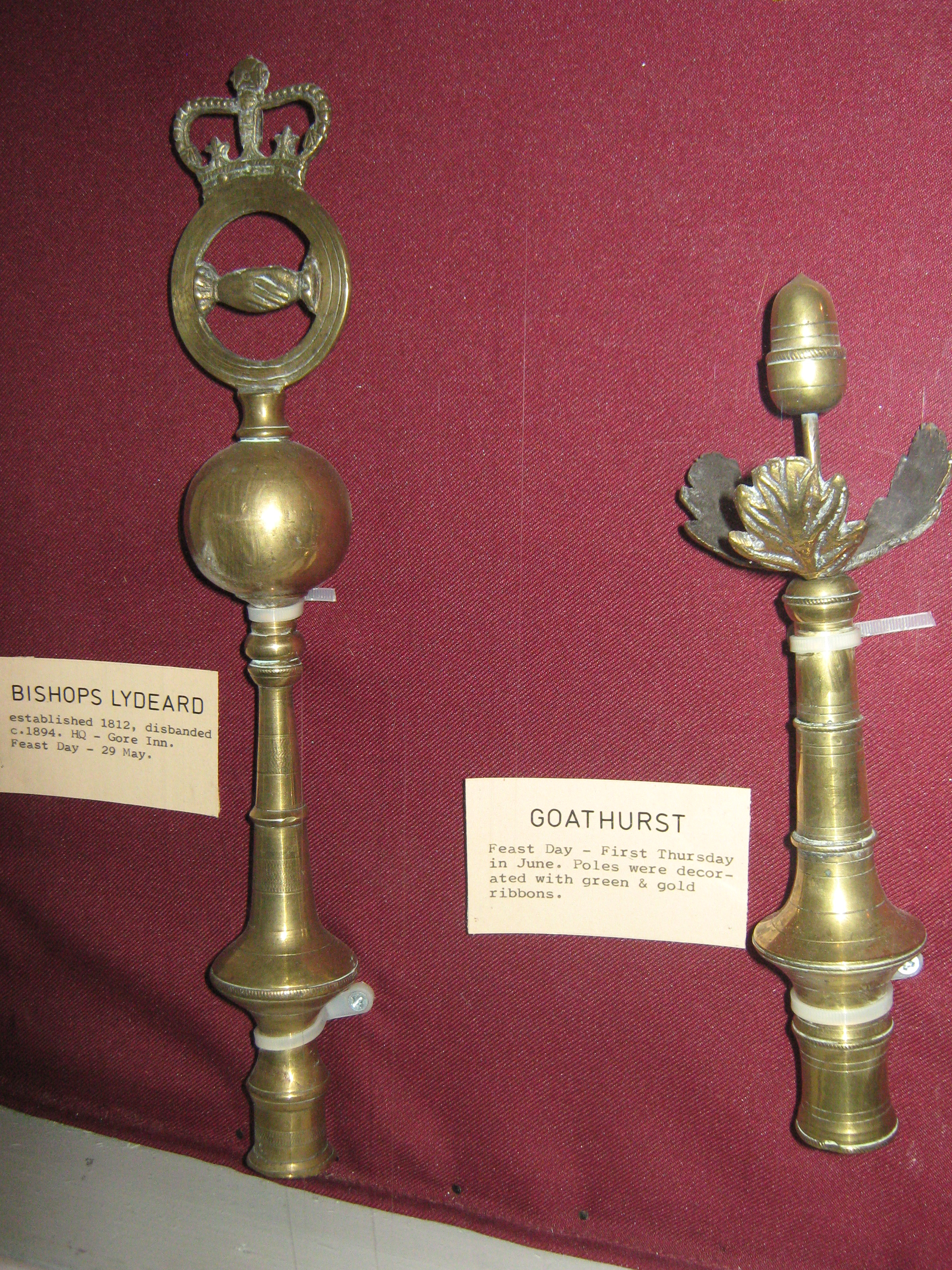
Bishops Lydeard and Goathurst Friendly Society Brasses
