= Stave dancing =

Style of folk dance

Stave dancing is a style of folk dance from the south-west of England, especially Somerset, Dorset, and Wiltshire. Teams of dancers carry long decorated poles, known as staves, over their shoulders whilst performing. Having effectively died-out in the 1920s, interest in the style revived in the 1980s, and today a number of Morris and country dancing teams perpetuate the tradition. Some claim the tradition's origins lie in the annual ‘club-walks’ of the friendly societies.

Stave dancing on Dartmoor, Devon. Bradninch Millers perform a Stourton Caundle dance "Arches".

== Dancing style ==
Stave dances are, essentially, English country dances adapted to have dancers perform whilst carrying a stave over their right shoulder. They are performed by mixed groups of dancers, organised into sets of four, six, eight, or more who perform figures to the accompaniment of traditional country dance tunes. The steps are similar to those used in some Morris and country dances including double-stepping, a travelling ‘ranting’ or ‘polka’ step, and a country dance ‘chasing’ step - also known as a 'Dorset skip-change' step. Whilst the staves are mainly carried on the shoulder, some dances require the dancers to form arches or other figures. Few original dances are known—most of those now performed originate from a small group of villages in Somerset and Dorset—notably Stourton Caundle and Fifehead Magdalen although many new dances have been choreographed within the style.

Somerset Morris' staves. The team use original 19th century friendly society brasses for their stave heads.

== Equipment and dress ==
It is claimed that dancing staves evolved from the staves carried by friendly society stewards and some members on formal occasions. These, in turn, replicated the civic staves that civic dignitaries had carried for centuries. Modern dancing staves consist of a wooden pole, typically four to six feet in length, topped with an emblem of either wood or brass and often decorated with ribbons. Although colours varied, blue was a common friendly society livery. Each society had its own dress code so one can only generalize. Most societies required all their members to be “decently dressed”, especially on club walks. This usually meant that everyone turned out in their “Sunday best”. For the stewards, black coats were invariably the order, often tail coats. A blue sash was also common for stewards. One society prescribed that stewards must wear white moleskin trousers, whilst another specifically banned smocks. Hats were required – usually top hats for stewards with bowlers or caps for members. Hats were usually decorated with ribbons, again usually blue, or with a blue cockade at the front or side. The Broadway Friendly Society of Ilminster stipulated that it was the duty of each steward: “To go to church with his pole and brass knob and one blue ribbon on it, and one blue knot in his hat”. The Hatch Beauchamp Friendly Society near Taunton stipulated that “the pole must be blue and not less than a yard and a half of blue ribbon attached”. Modern stave dancing teams sometimes copy these styles of dress and equipment.

Earliest known representation of stave dancing from 1838

== Origins ==
The English Folk Dance and Song Society submits that the origins of stave dancing may lie in the ‘club walks’ of the friendly societies in the south-west of England during the middle years of the nineteenth century. In addition to their principal function of providing sickness and death benefits, friendly societies also had a lively social side intended to foster fraternity amongst their members. This manifested itself in the annual ‘club walk’, a social occasion that usually involved a parade, church service, and dinner, along with music and other entertainments. During these events, the members and stewards of many societies carried staves as a symbol of office. It is claimed that, at some club-walks in the south-west, members took to performing both processional and contemporary country dances whilst carrying their staves, leading to the development of the stave dancing tradition. Few primary sources are known although a letter in the Helm Collection at University College, London gives an account of stave dancing during club walks in Shrawley, Worcestershire around 1880:

My grandfather died two years ago and with him went a great deal of knowledge of what used to happen in Shrawley on Whit-Monday and Midsummer's Day. I do not know when the dancing, the mummers or the "Club Walk" died out. He took part in all these until he joined the army as a lad of 17 which would be around 1878-1880 (for he was 94 when he died). The dancing seems to have been processional in character, headed by the local dignitaries, starting and finishing at the "Rose & Crown" and perambulating the bounds of the parish. They carried long poles topped by "crowns" (he called them) which seem to have been bunches of flowers. The poles were painted "like a barber's pole". The walk took place at Whit & Midsummer.

— D.Taylor, Helm Collection

Such other contemporary references as are known to exist, mostly newspaper reports and friendly society minute books, suggest that the tradition had largely died out by the late 1920s, the last recorded instance being at Shepton Beauchamp, near Ilminster, in 1928. However, at Henton, near Wells in Somerset, stave dancing appears to have been competitive and to have survived into the early 1930s. Referring to it as step dancing, the Wells Journal in various reports of the Henton Friendly Society Club Day said:

At Henton last year I was delighted to see some of the real old-time step dancing by members, complete with spears [staves] and sashes who footed it neatly in spite of “anno domini”.

— Wells Journal 30 May 1930

The competitors, when dancing, waved their society spearheads [staves] and kept time to the accordion music provided by Mr. J. Andrews of Godney with feet which, although not clad in dancing pumps, were very nimble, and they showed much energy in those dances for which Somerset is renowned.

— Wells Journal 9 June 1933

A feature of the day’s programme is the step dancing competition which follows the dinner. For this display the villagers are allowed to enter the marquee and a large crowd assembled to watch the Mendippers carrying their brass-headed staves “step the board”.

— Wells Journal 25 May 1934

The Morris Federation added:

Individual stave dances were like The Broom Dance except that one part involved twirling the stave overhead. Four dancers would also perform a ‘rose’ figure with the staves held aloft to form a square.

— The Morris Federation

Fleur-de-Lys Morris from Godalming, Surrey perform a new stave dance "Magic Circles"

Somerset Morris perform a new stave dance "Round House"

== Revival ==
The modern revival of stave dancing may be attributed almost entirely to the efforts of one man, Roy Dommett, who claimed to have re-discovered the tradition, and subsequently went on to regenerate interest in it. A former scientist and noted researcher and teacher of folk dancing, Dommett uncovered a number of references to stave dancing, including primary-source material that was supplied by Maud Karpeles, whilst researching other aspects of English folk dance in the 1970s. After examining as many contemporary references as could be found, he concluded that stave dancing not only grew out of the social activities of the south-western friendly societies, but that it represented a distinct style of English folk-dance worthy of standing alongside other English dancing traditions; conclusive evidence of many of whose origins is equally obscure. Little in the way of reliable choreography or musical notation could be found and so, with the help of one or two morris dancing teams including Bath City Morris and Abercorn Morris, Dommett re-choreographed a number of dances:

During a search for mentions of details of rural ceremonial costumes, I found in Friendly Society records some information about the dances done at some of the places that danced as part of their annual perambulation before their Club Day church service and feast. Club Walks are also mentioned in Barnes' poems and in books, and some details have appeared in print. At Stourton Caundle the material is a list of first and second parts which translated well into figures and choruses; at Fifehead Magdalen a list of titles of dance[s] to be practiced, some of which could be traced to printed source books; and a brief description [in] a newspaper account of a dance at a wedding at Buckhorn Weston; and finally odd dances described in manuscripts such as Maud Karpeles [from] Seend in Wiltshire. The material has been given to southern sides who wanted to dance something local.

— Roy Dommett, The Sources of Our Dances, Great Western Morris

Many Societies ended the day with a dance and some included dancing in the activities during the Club Walk. Raymond in ‘Country Life’ 1934, mentions the dancing of Hunt the Squirrel and the Four Hand Reels. Maud Karpeles collected a finishing dance in Wiltshire which was a version of Up the Sides and Down the Middle. At Paulton near Bath, stepdancing is specifically mentioned in a local history. Where formal dancing was done it was derived directly from contemporary social dance. Dancing seems to have featured west of Gillingham, Dorset where a newspaper account described dancing at a wedding at Buckhorn Weston, the men carrying their staves to do a version of the Six Hand Reel. The minute book of Fifehead Magdalen in north Dorset states that Haste to the Wedding, Pop Goes the Weasel, the Dorsetshire March and Spithead Fleet would be practiced and danced at the stations on the walk. At Stourton Caundle, near Sturminster Newton in Dorset, a note exists of a set of three dances.

— Roy Dommett, Morris Dancing and Folk Customs: A series of talks by Roy Dommett

For many years he strove to see the tradition become accepted as a bona fide style of English folk-dance and to encourage its performance through a series of workshops and lectures. Today, variations of Dommett’s dances, together with many new dances created within the tradition, are performed by a small number of Morris dancing teams across the south-west of England including Somerset Morris, Fleur-de-Lys Morris and Bradninch Millers.
