= Maison de la Mutualité =

Paris conference center

Coordinates: 48°50′55.5″N 2°21′2″E

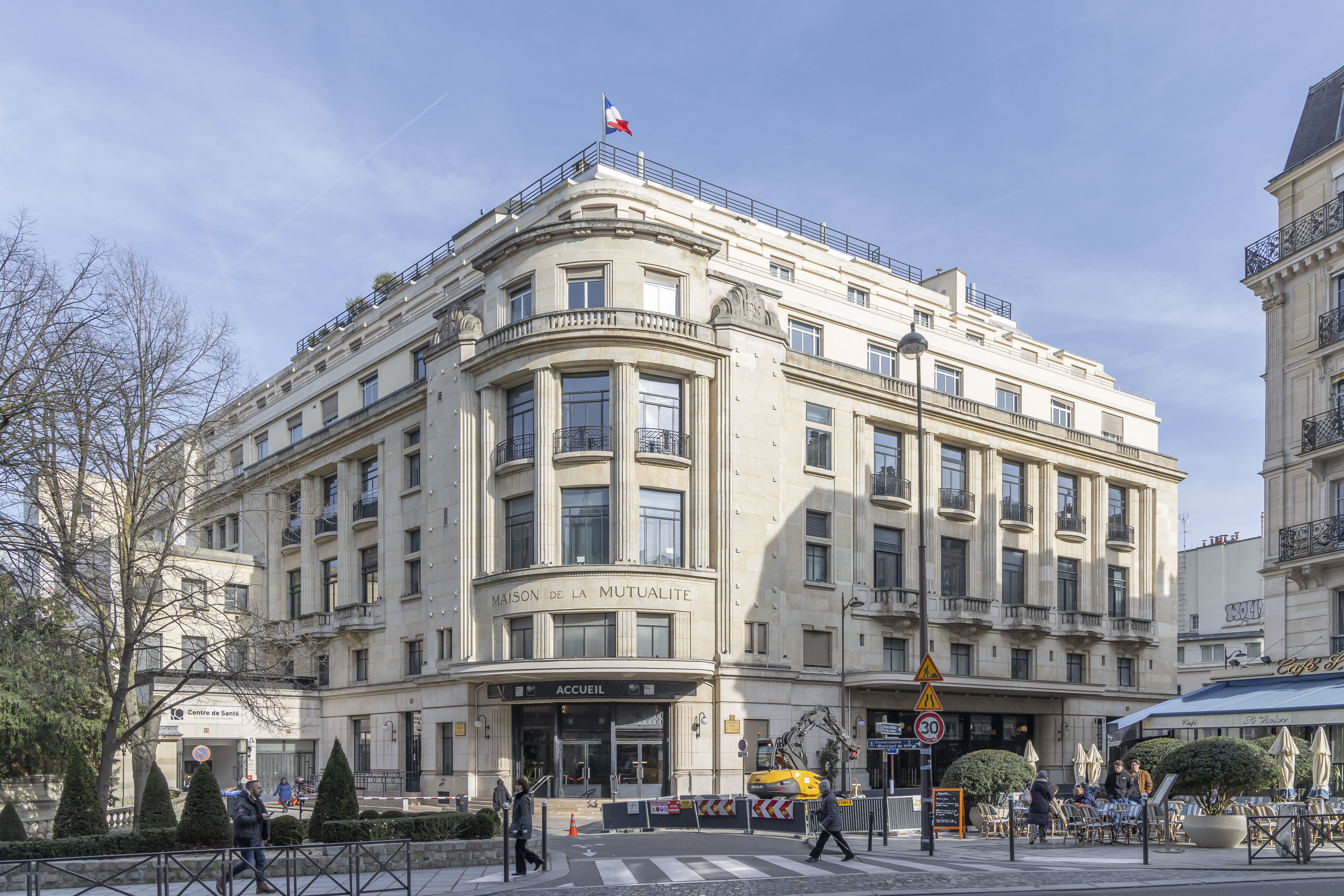
Maison de la Mutualité

The Maison de la Mutualité (French pronunciation: [mɛzɔ̃ də la mytɥalite]; often shortened to la Mutualité) is a conference center at 24 Rue Saint-Victor, 5th arrondissement of Paris, France. The closest métro station is Maubert-Mutualité.

It is the headquarters of the federation of nonprofit mutual insurers of the Île-de-France région, which rents its halls and rooms to outside users. The conference center has an attached restaurant.

La Mutualité hosts a variety of events, from the yearly meeting of the shareholders of small companies to important meetings of national political parties. Because of the latter, it often appears in the news.

The theatre of the Maison de la Mutualité was used as a classical recordings venue, particularly for many records by the Paris Conservatoire Orchestra after the Second World War, but also in more recent years, for instance by Deutsche Grammophon for Messiaen's Quatuor pour la fin du temps and by Philips for Cavalleria rusticana conducted Semyon Bychkov.

French anarchist singer-songwriters Léo Ferré (see live album Léo Ferré Mai 68) and Renaud sang here. Congolese band Zaïko Langa Langa headlined many concerts in the hall between 1989 and 1991.

In 1950 the Association Internationale de la Mutualité was established during a conference in the Maison de la Mutualité.
