= Charity Children Choirs =

Variety of 18th century music in London

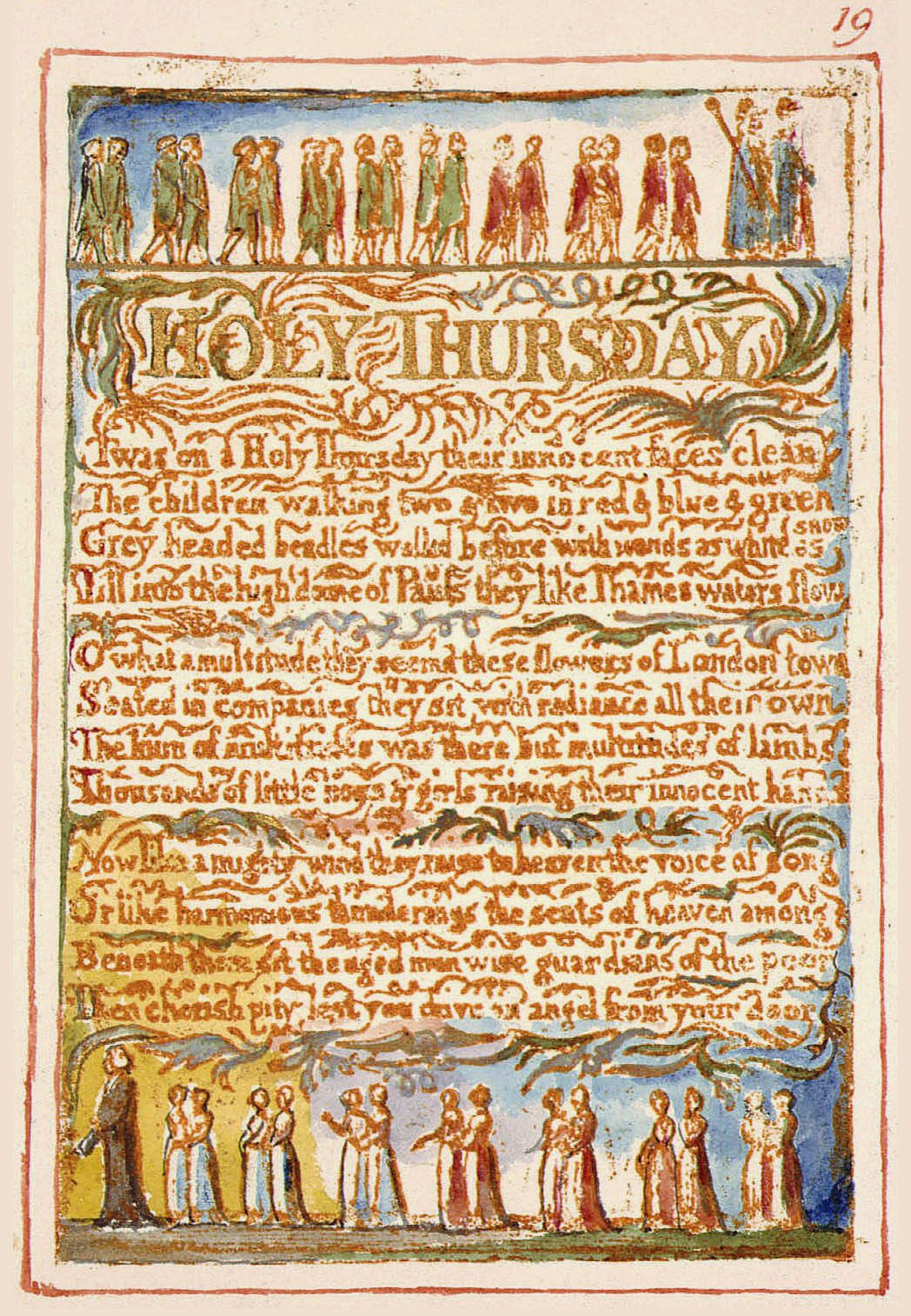
Blake's "Twas on a Holy Thursday" (1789), (Copy AA, a 1826 print in The Fitzwilliam Museum). "Holy Thursday" here refers to Ascension rather than Maundy Thursday.

Choirs of Charity Children became a feature of London parish church music in the 18th century. From 1704 to 1877 they combined for an annual benefit concert and the impression of massed voices numbering in the thousands was remarked on by visitors including William Blake, Joseph Haydn and Hector Berlioz.

== History ==
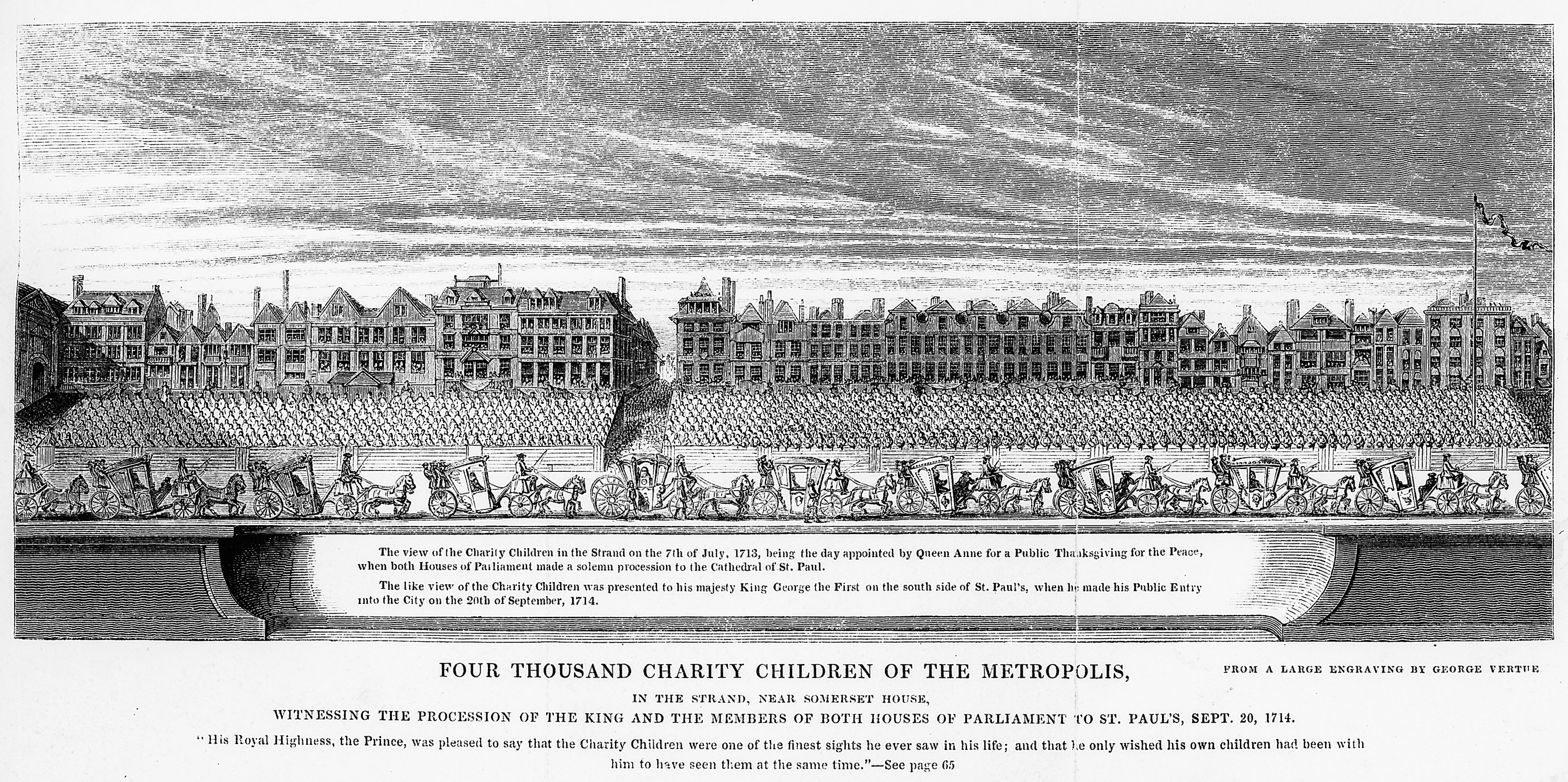
Four thousand charity children at Treaty of Utrecht procession along the Strand

Organ-led congregational singing and choirs attached to orphanages and charity schools distinguished church music in the capital from the West gallery music of other towns. The various choirs were brought together (by the Society for Promoting Christian Knowledge?) for a festival at St Andrew's Church, Holborn in 1704 and annually at St Sepulchre-without-Newgate, moving to Christ Church, Newgate Street after 1738. They sang on other occasions as well, and at the celebrations of the Peace of Utrecht already numbered "Four thousand children from London charity schools [who] were ‘placed upon a machine in the Strand’ and throughout the event they sang ‘hymns of . . . praise to God, for her Majesty’ and the gift of peace."

John Wesley collected numerous hymns; one entitled "Yearly Hymn for Charity Children" begins:

Again the kind revolving Year
Has brought this happy Day,
And we in God's bless'd House appear
Again our Vows to pay.

Our watchful Gard[ia]ns, rob'd in Light,
Adore the Heavenly King;
Ten thousand thousand Seraphs bright
Incessant Praises sing.

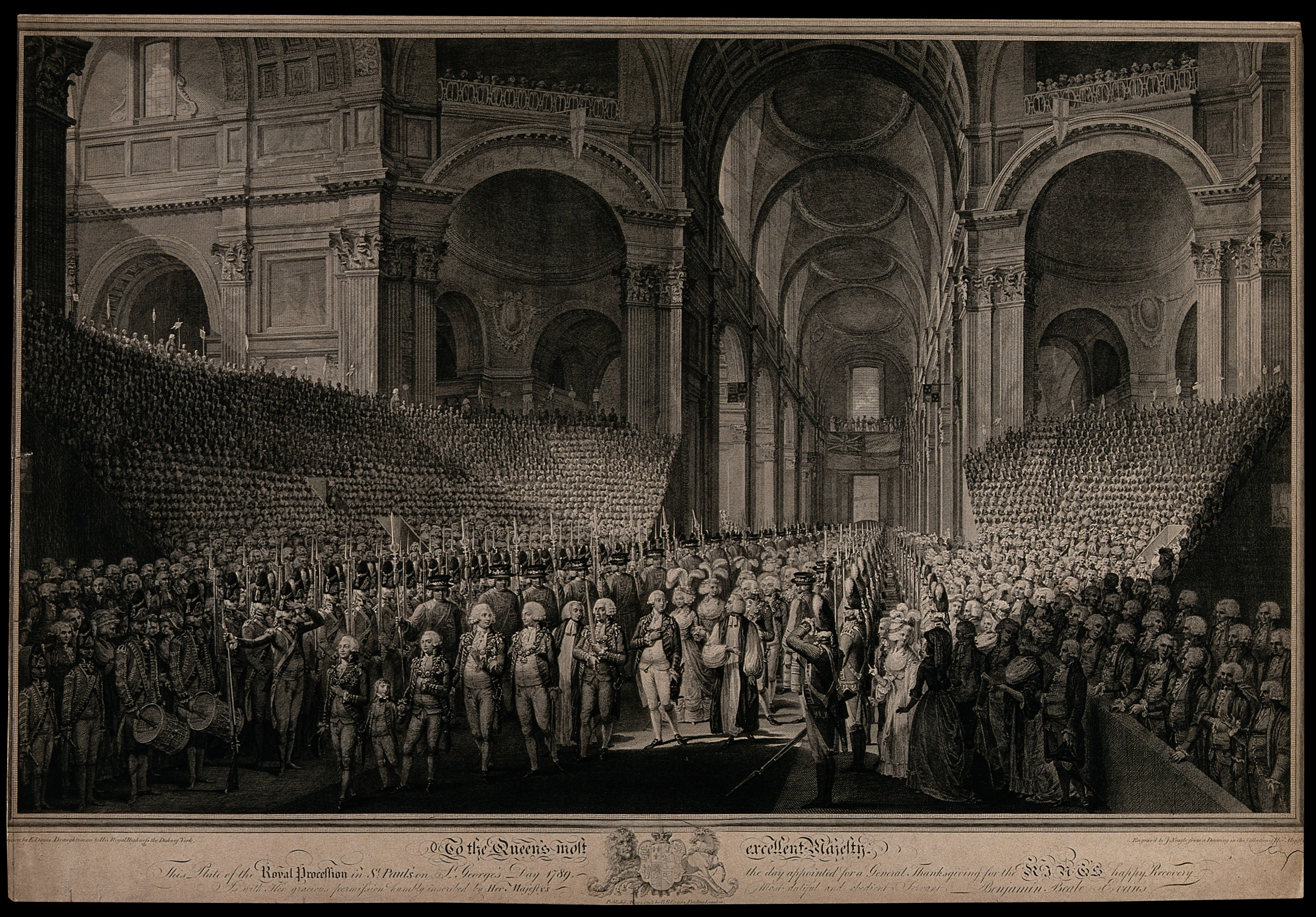
The Charity Children sang at St. Paul's Cathedral at a service in honour of George III's recovery in 1789.

From 1782 the annual festival took place beneath the dome of St. Paul's Cathedral. Sir Gilbert Elliot described the National Thanksgiving for George III's recovery 23 April 1789 in a letter:

…the drums stopped, and the organ began; and when the King approached the centre all the 6,000 children set up their little voices and sang part of

the Hundredth Psalm. This was the moment that I found most affecting; and without knowing exactly why, I found my eyes running over, and the bone in my throat, which was the case with many other people.

1789 letter of Sir Gilbert Elliot

Haydn attended the service on 9 June 1791:

8 Tage vr. Pfingsten hörte ich in St Pauls-Kürch 4000 spittall Kinder nachstehendes lied singen, ein Performer gab den Tact dazu, keine Music rührte mich zeit lebens so heftig als diese andachts volle und unschuldige [ Anglican chant example] NB: alle Kinder sind neu gekleidet und ziehen processionaliter dahin, der organist spilt ganz artig und einfach die Melodie vor, alsdan fiengen alle zugleich an zu singen.

A week before Whitsun I heard 4000 charity children sing the following hymn in St Paul's church; a "Performer" gave the beat. In my lifetime no music has so powerfully moved me as this reverent and innocent one did: [No. 26 from John Jones' Sixty Chants Single and Double (1785)] The children are all dressed in new clothes and enter in procession; the organist plays the tune nicely and simply and then all begin together in singing.

Haydn's biographer Albert Christoph Dies reports that after reading him this account from his pocket notebook, Haydn added "I stood there and wept like a child."

== See also ==
- Foundling Hospital
- Charity School
- Music at the Foundling Hospital

== Bibliography ==
- Wikisource:A Dictionary of Music and Musicians/Charity Children Charles Mackeson: Charity Children in 1900 Grove's Dictionary
- New Grove "Charity Children" redirects to London (i) 1.1.4
- Hector Berlioz: Les soirées de l’orchestre (1852), excerpted in "The Charity Children at St. Pauls', The Musical Times, 21 June 1862, pp. 390–91.
- Julie Farguson: Promoting the Peace: Queen Anne and the Public Thanksgiving at St Paul’s Cathedral in Performances of Peace: Utrecht 1713 ed. Renger E. de Bruin, Cornelis van der Haven, Lotte Jensen and David Onnekink
- Bernarr Rainbow: Singing for their Supper (The Musical Times, Apr., 1984, Vol. 125, No. 1694 (Apr., 1984), pp. 227+229)
- Ian Spink: Haydn at St Paul's: 1791 or 1792? (Early Music, May, 2005, Vol. 33, No. 2 (May, 2005), pp. 273–280)
- M.G. Jones: The Charity School Movement: A Study of Eighteenth Century Puritanism in Action (Cambridge: Cambridge Univ. Press, 1938)
