= William Denis Browne =

British composer, pianist, organist and music critic

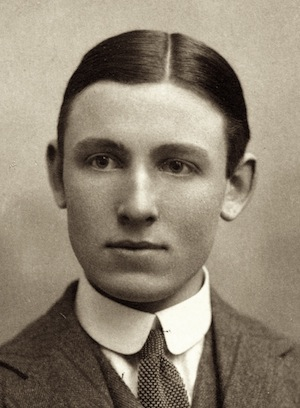
- Portrait photograph of William Denis Browne
- Born: William Charles Denis Browne; 3 November 1888; Leamington Spa, Warwickshire, England
- Died: 4 June 1915 (aged 26); Gallipoli, Ottoman Empire
- Education: Rugby School; Clare College, Cambridge
- Military career
- Allegiance: United Kingdom
- Branch: Royal Naval Volunteer Reserve
- Service years: 1914–1915
- Rank: Sub-lieutenant
- Unit: Royal Naval Division
- Conflicts: First World War: Siege of Antwerp (1914); Gallipoli campaign; Third Battle of Krithia †

William Charles Denis Browne (3 November 1888 – 4 June 1915), primarily known as Billy to family and as Denis to his friends, was a British composer, pianist, organist and music critic of the early 20th century. He and his close friend, poet Rupert Brooke, were commissioned into the Royal Naval Division together shortly after the outbreak of the First World War. Denis Browne was killed in action during the Gallipoli Campaign.

== Early life ==
Denis Browne was born in Leamington Spa, Warwickshire, England, on 3 November 1888; his parents were of Anglo-Irish descent. His father, William Denis Browne (1836–1916), had been a land agent and had served as a juror in the Phoenix Park Murders trial. His paternal grandfather, Denis Browne, had been Dean of Emly Cathedral (the cathedral was demolished in 1877), and a great-grandfather, Denis Browne (1763–1828), was Member of Parliament for County Mayo and younger brother of the 1st Marquess of Sligo.

He showed early musical talent, and by the age of 15 was running the choir and playing the organ for all Sunday services at the church his family attended. He attended Greyfriars Preparatory School in Leamington and in 1903 took up a classics scholarship at Rugby School, having turned down one for mathematics at Harrow School. It was at Rugby that Denis Browne first met Rupert Brooke, son of a master and a year older, and they greatly influenced each other. In 1906, Denis Browne pestered Brooke to write a poem for him to set to music for Easter Day. Brooke eventually did so, the result being "A song in praise of Cremation written to my lady on Easter Day"; Brooke was impressed with Denis Browne's musical setting of it.

== University ==
In 1907 Denis Browne proceeded to Clare College, Cambridge, having again obtained a scholarship, and following Brooke who had gone up to King's the previous year. At Cambridge he continued his musical activities, and also took part (with Brooke) in student theatrical productions.

At Cambridge he also became acquainted with a number of other musicians, including Arthur Bliss, Cecil Armstrong Gibbs, Clive Carey, Steuart Wilson and Ralph Vaughan Williams. Perhaps more significantly the Cambridge don Edward Joseph Dent rated him "by far the cleverest of the musicians" then at the university.

His results in his BA were disappointing, which saw the end of the Civil Service career for which his father had hoped. Given this, and with some persuasion from his friends, he persuaded his father to allow him to undertake further studies in music. In 1910 Denis Browne became organ scholar at Clare, and masterminded the installation of a new organ. In this period at Cambridge, he studied composition with Charles Wood, organ with Alan Gray, and piano with Ursula Newton (a former pupil of Ferruccio Busoni). Many of his compositions at time were premiered by the college choir or orchestra. He also became known as a promising conductor. He sang in the chorus which premiered Vaughan Williams' incidental music for The Wasps, and also played through Hugh the Drover and On Wenlock Edge whilst Vaughan Williams was still working on them.

== Career ==
With the completion of his MusB, Denis Browne took a job at Repton School as an assistant music master and school organist in April 1912, Vaughan Williams wrote him a reference describing him as having "a most musical nature and his artistic judgement and perception are remarkable". He formally graduated with distinction in May 1912. He immediately improved musical standards at Repton noticeably.

He and Wilson visited Busoni in Berlin. He became a favoured student of Busoni but excessive piano practice led him to injure his hand, suffering from either tenosynovitis or neuritis (with the possibility of paralysis). As a result, in December 1912 he resigned his position at Repton.

He then took up the position as organist at Guy's Hospital (in succession to Carey) in early 1913, supplementing his income with various freelance positions. These included teaching at Morley College (deputising for Gustav Holst), assorted choral conducting positions, and acting as accompanist to Carey, Wilson and the French soprano Jane Bathori-Engel. He also became known as a critic, writing for the Blue Review, the New Statesman, The Daily Telegraph and The Times. In his Grove article, Hugh Taylor describes Denis Browne's criticism as "reveal[ing] a brilliant musical mind".

Denis Browne had stayed in touch with Brooke, and through him met Edward Marsh. Denis Browne became part of Marsh's Georgian circle, establishing himself as a particular favourite during Brooke's overseas travels in 1913 and 1914, although Denis Browne and Marsh had differing views of the musical merits of Igor Stravinsky's ballet The Rite of Spring.

== War service ==
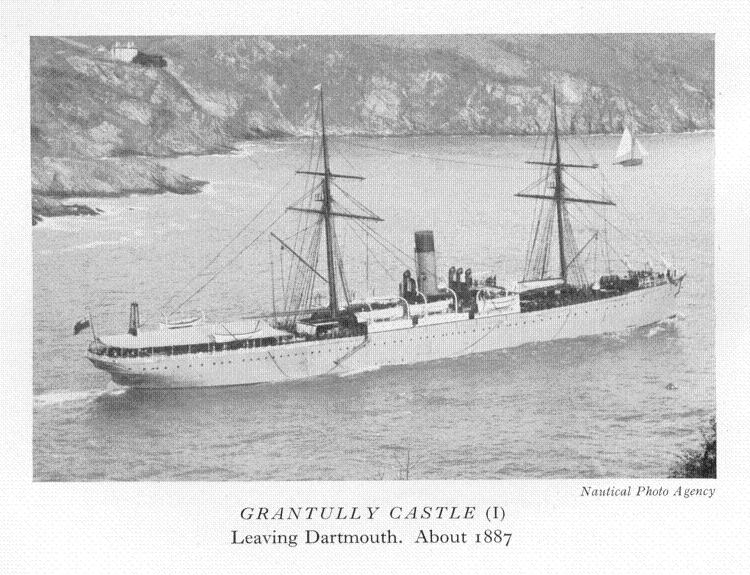
The Grantully Castle (pictured c.1887) which transported Browne and Brooke to Gallipoli; Brooke died in transit

On the outbreak of the First World War, Marsh used his influence as Private Secretary to Winston Churchill (then First Lord of the Admiralty) to obtain Brooke a commission. Brooke refused to take it unless Denis Browne was also commissioned, which happened by mid-September 1914: they both granted temporary commissions as sub-lieutenants in the Royal Naval Volunteer Reserve. They were assigned to the newly formed Royal Naval Division, joining the Anson Battalion of the 2nd Naval Brigade. They participated in the abortive Antwerp Expedition in October 1914, which sought to relieve the Siege of Antwerp, before being transferred to the Hood Battalion, to join the force being assembled for the Gallipoli landings. They sailed in the Grantully Castle, Denis Browne passed his time playing duets with F. S. Kelly and directing the band of the Hood Battalion. Brooke died during the journey, contracting septicaemia after an insect bite. Denis Browne chose the site of his grave on Skyros, writing:

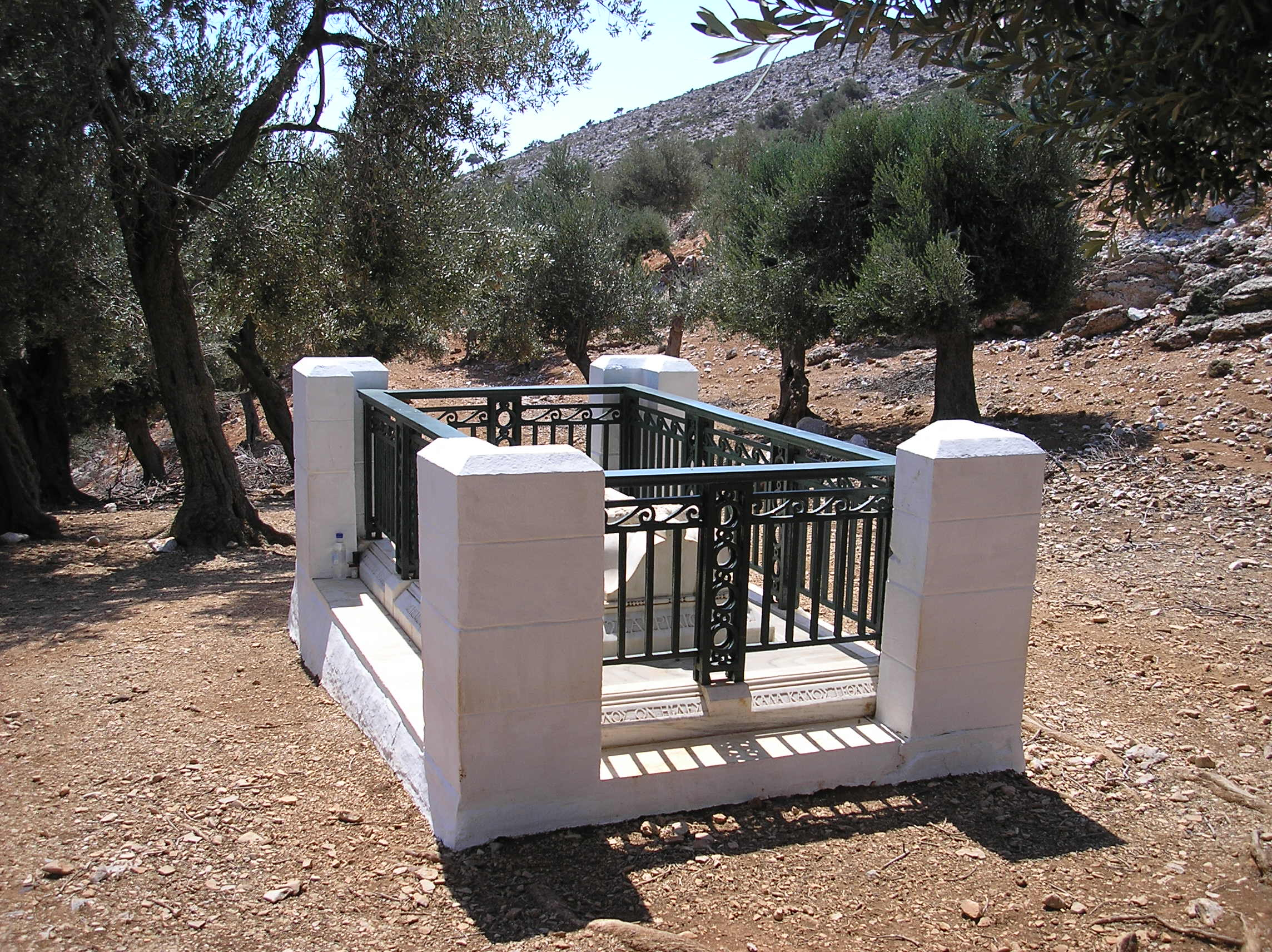
Grave of Rupert Brooke on Skyros Island, Greece

...I sat with Rupert. At 4 o'clock he became weaker, and at 4:46 he died, with the sun shining all round his cabin, and the cool sea-breeze blowing through the door and the shaded windows. No one could have wished for a quieter or a calmer end than in that lovely bay, shielded by the mountains and fragrant with sage and thyme.

Denis Browne saw action in the Dardanelles, and was wounded in the neck on 8 May 1915. He recuperated in Egypt, and rejoined his unit in early June, despite not being fully fit. During the Third Battle of Krithia he took part in an attack on Turkish trenches on 4 June 1915 during which he was wounded first in the shoulder and then the stomach. It was not possible to evacuate him, but he passed his wallet to a petty officer, to be returned home.

== Legacy ==
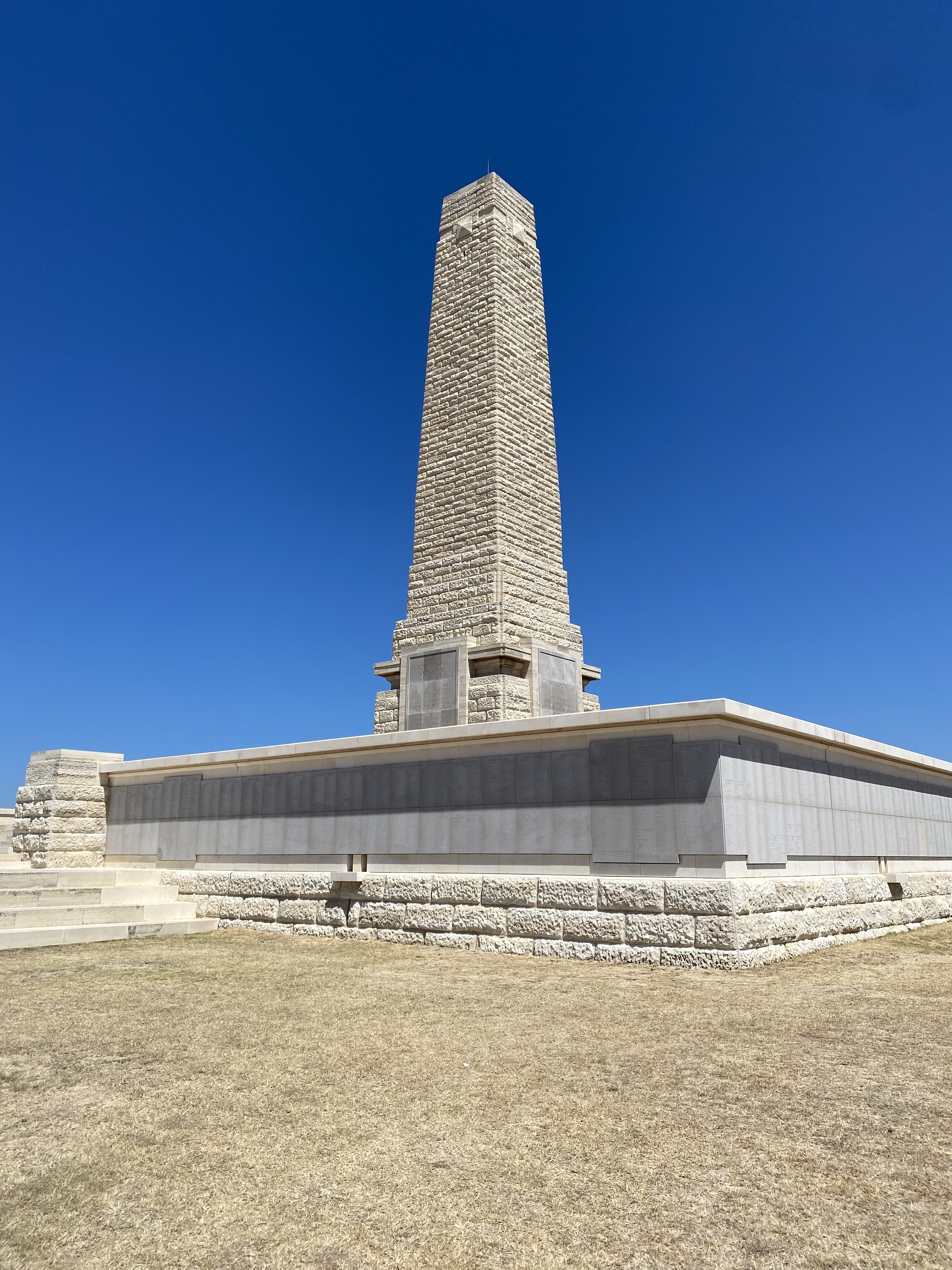
Browne is commemorated on the CWGC Helles Memorial in Turkey

The wallet was found to contain his last letter to Marsh:

I’ve gone now too; not too badly I hope. I’m luckier than Rupert, because I’ve fought. But there’s no one to bury me as I buried him, so perhaps he’s best off in the long run. I got a little image from a tomb for you at Cairo: will you ask my mother for it? It is with the rest of my things, packed in a cigarette box. Dent is looking after my MS music. Good-bye, my dear, & bless you always for your goodness to me. W.D.B.

Browne's body was never recovered; he is commemorated on the Commonwealth War Graves Commission Helles Memorial near Cape Helles in Turkey.

In an earlier letter to Dent, Denis Browne had asked him to destroy any compositions that did not represent him at his best. Aided by Vaughan Williams and Wilson in sorting through Denis Browne's work, Dent burnt most of the compositions; those that remain are now held in the archives of Clare College, and the music and manuscript collections of the British Library.

In 1918, Marion Scott pressed Dent to allow performance of the remaining works (having first established that Denis Browne's mother wished to see them performed). After some initial resistance, a concert was arranged at Wigmore Hall on 24 April 1918.

Many of Denis Browne's surviving songs have been recorded, by Graham Trew, Martyn Hill, Ian Bostridge, Andrew Kennedy and Christopher Maltman. On 11 November 2007, his Magnificat and Nunc Dimittis in G major was performed in a BBC Radio 3 broadcast of Choral Evensong for Remembrance Day, given by the Choir of Clare College, and on 21 May 2009 the same station broadcast Maltman's recording of "To Gratiana dancing and singing", following Andrew Motion reading his own poem "The Grave of Rupert Brooke". His Two Dances for Small Orchestra were recorded for BBC Radio 3 in June 2014. A reconstruction of his ballet The Comic Spirit was performed by the Southbank Sinfonia with dancers from the Central School of Ballet in June 2015. This was later performed by the BBC Philharmonic for Composer of the Week in August 2016.

Denis Browne is mostly remembered for his friendship with poet Rupert Brooke, from their years together at Rugby School and the University of Cambridge. He set several of Brooke's poems to music, although these settings did not survive Dent's purging of the works. Fellow soldier and poet Wilfrid Wilson Gibson dedicated a poem to Browne in his 1916 volume of poems entitled Battle, and other Poems.

== Works ==
The surviving works are:

- Songs:
  - Move Eastward, Happy Earth & The Snowdrop (Alfred, Lord Tennyson), 1908
  - The isle of lost dreams (William Sharp), ?1909
  - Dream-Tryst (Francis Thompson), 1909
  - Had I the Heavens' embroidered cloths & The Fiddler of Dooney (W. B. Yeats) 1909
  - Parting, 1910
  - Diaphenia (Henry Chettle), 1912
  - Epitaph on Salathiel Pavy (Ben Jonson), 1912
  - To Gratiana dancing and singing (Richard Lovelace), 1913
  - Arabia (Walter de la Mare), 1914
- Choral:
  - The Kraken, from The Kraken (Tennyson), 1909
  - Magnificat and Nunc dimittis in A, SATB with organ, 1911
  - God is our Strength and Song (J. Montgomery), SSATB, 1912 (Anthem)
- Instrumental
  - Two Dances for Small Orchestra (1912)
  - The Comic Spirit a "ballet-pantomime" in one act (1914) for orchestra or piano duet. Score partially lost, an authorised completion was created in 2014
  - Miniature Suite for Full Orchestra (incomplete reorchestration of first Orchestral Dance)
  - Intermezzo (arrangements of second Orchestral Dance for string quartet or piano)

== Further sources ==
- Marsh, Edward, Rupert Brooke: A Memoir (published by Dodd, Mead and Company, 1922).
