= Charity school =

School supported as charity

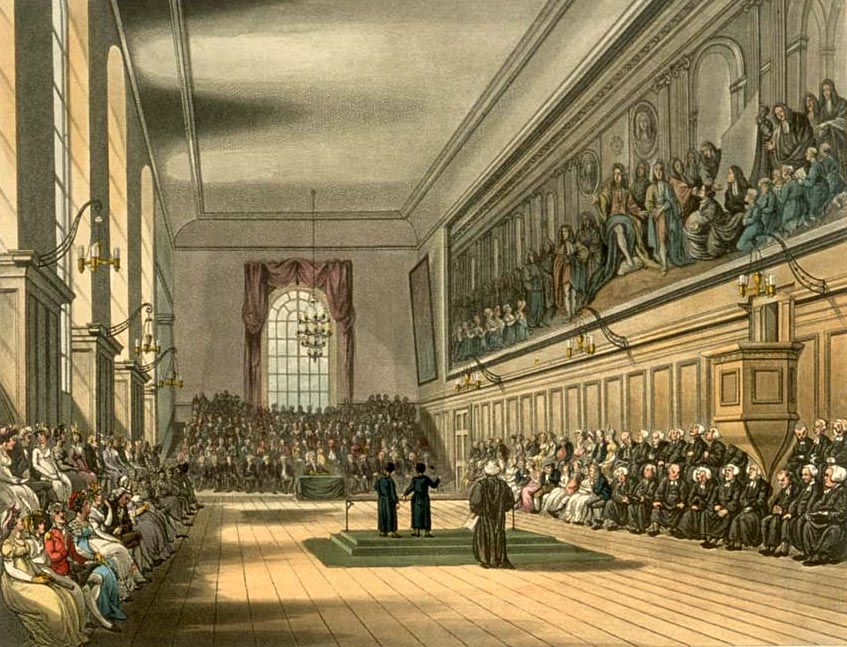
The Blue Coat School (in this case Christ's Hospital, London) as drawn by Augustus Pugin and Thomas Rowlandson for Rudolph Ackermann's Microcosm of London (1808–1811). The picture shows the Great Hall on St. Matthew's Day, September 21. Two senior boys destined for scholarships to Oxford and Cambridge Universities, known as Grecians, gave orations in praise of the school, one in Latin and the other in English.

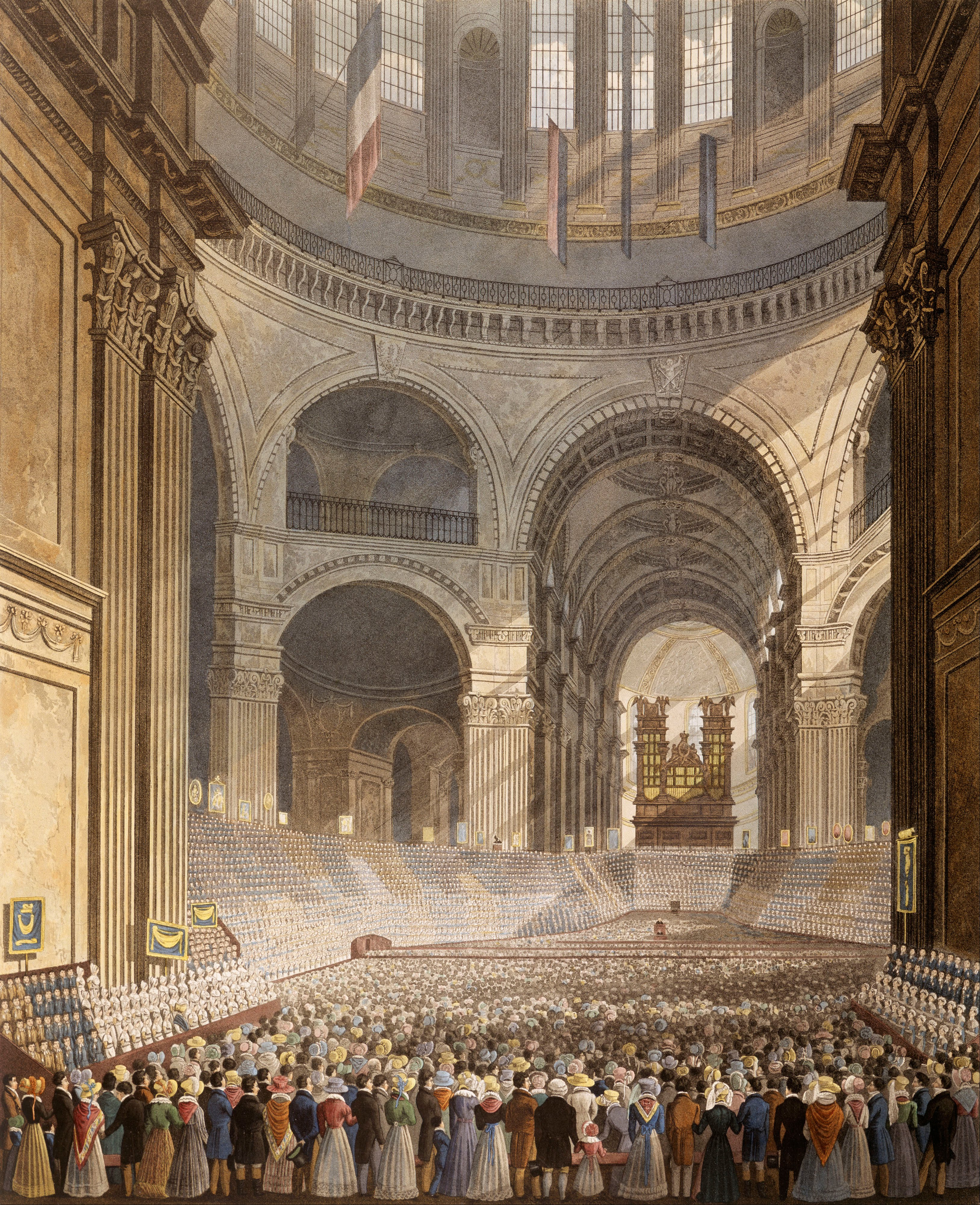
The Anniversary Meeting of the Charity Children in the Cathedral of St. Paul, 1826

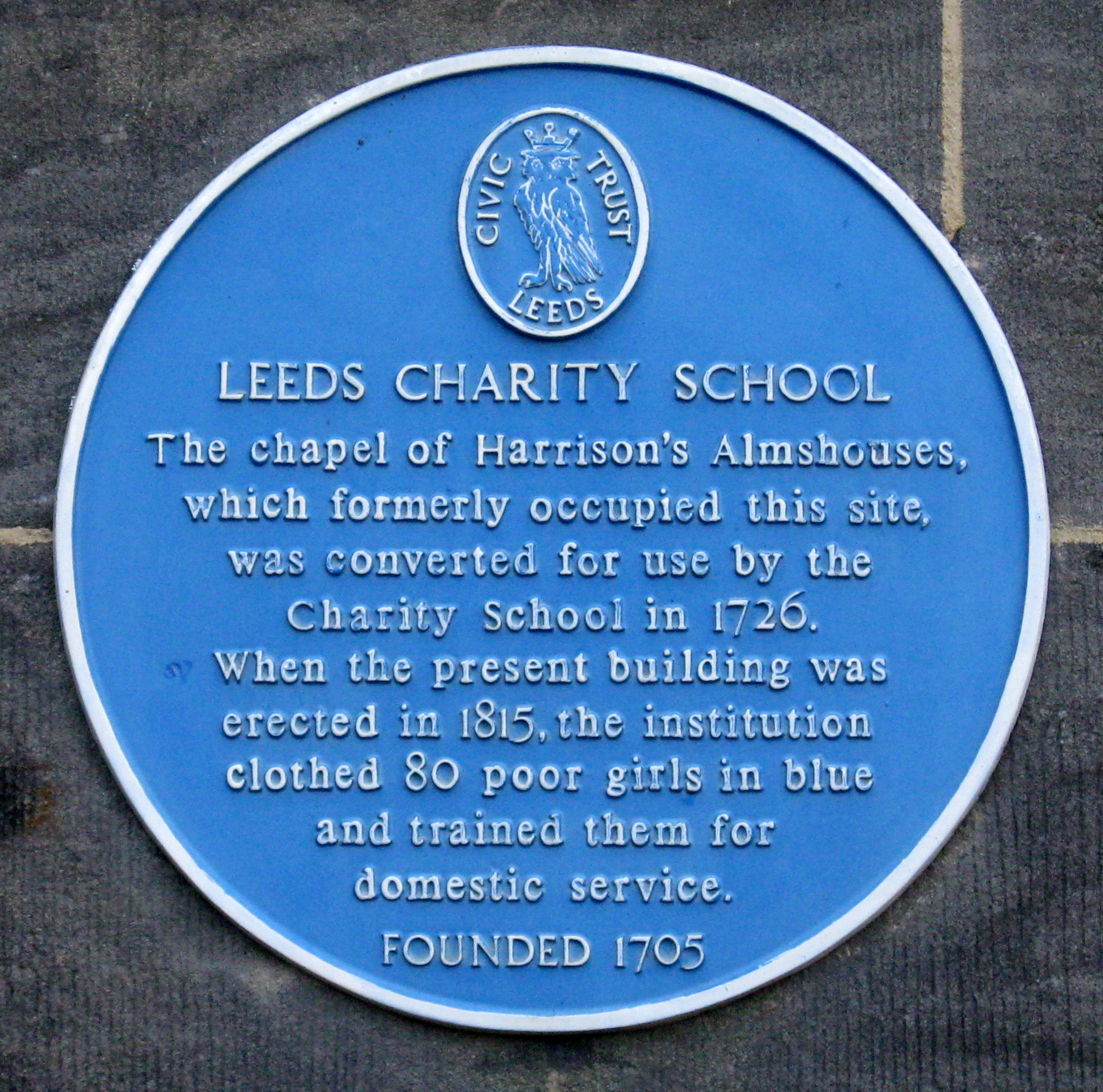
Leeds Charity School Blue Plaque

Charity schools, sometimes called blue coat schools, or simply the Blue School, were significant in the history of education in England. They were built and maintained in various parishes by the voluntary contributions of the inhabitants to teach poor children to read and write, and for other necessary parts of education. They were usually maintained by religious organisations, which provided clothing and education to students freely or at little charge. In most charity schools, children were put out to trades, services, etc., by the same charitable foundation. Some schools were more ambitious than this and sent a few pupils on to university.

Charity schools began in London, and spread throughout most of the urban areas in England and Wales. By 1710, the statistics for charity schools in and around London were as follows: number of schools, 88; boys taught, 2,181; girls, 1,221; boys put out to apprentices, 967; girls, 407. By the 19th century, English elementary schools were predominantly charity schools.

== Blue coat schools in order of foundation ==
School	Date of Foundation	Notes
Christ's Hospital, Horsham	1552	Independent boarding school. The oldest surviving Bluecoat school.
Blue Coat Boys' School	1574	Housed in the Poor Priest's Hospital in Canterbury, which later became Simon Langton Grammar School for Boys and Simon Langton Girl's Grammar School
Queen Elizabeth's Hospital, Clifton, Bristol	1586	Also known as The City School
Norwich School for Poor Boys, Norwich	1617	Also known as the Anguish School, founded by bequest by Thomas Anguish, former mayor of the city.
Reading Blue Coat School	1646	Secondary school founded by Richard Aldworth.
Blue Coat School, Basingstoke	1646	Founded by Richard Aldworth.
Old Swinford Hospital, Stourbridge	1667	State boarding school
The King's Hospital or Blue Coat School, Dublin	1669	
Ladies Charity School, Highgate	c1680	Founded by William Blake
Greenwich Blue Coat Girls' School	1700	A girls' charity school
St Mary's School, Banbury	1705	A primary school founded as Bluecoat School
York Bluecoat School	1705	
Leeds Charity School	1705	
Nottingham Bluecoat School	1706	A church school
Liverpool Blue Coat School	1708	A grammar school
Nantwich Blue Cap School	<1712	
Tenison's School, Croydon	1714	
Coventry Blue Coat Church of England School	1714	A comprehensive school
Stanhope School	1715	Merged with the Addey School in 1894
Birmingham Blue Coat School	1722	An independent junior prep school
Bluecoat Primary School & Nursery, Stamford, Lincolnshire	18th century	
The Blue Coat School, Oldham	1834	
The Blue Coat School, Dudley	1869	Closed in 1989.
Bishop of Hereford's Bluecoat School	1973.	
Pilton Bluecoat C of E Primary School		A junior school in Devon

== See also ==
- Charity Children Choirs
- Bluecoat school
- Ragged school
- History of education in England
- Society for Promoting Christian Knowledge
