= Charlotte Richardson =

English poet (1775–1825)

- Born: 5 March 1775; York
- Died: 26 September 1825 (aged 50); Acomb, North Yorkshire
- Education: Grey Coats School
- Occupation: poet
- Spouse: Robert Richardson
- Children: one

Charlotte Richardson or Charlotte Smith (5 March 1775 – 26 September 1825) was a British poet.

== Life ==
Richardson was born in York in 1775 and by 1790 she had attended the basic Grey Coats School in York and she had become an orphan. She gave up her job as a cook/maid and married a shoemaker in 1802 but two years later he died of tuberculosis and she was a single parent.

Her benefactor was Catherine Cappe who knew her from her four years at school and her brother had been the Richardson family's doctor. Cappe was involved with education in York and she was the second wife of the Unitarian minister Newcombe Cappe. Cappe was impressed by her poetry and arranged for Poems on Different Occasions to be published. She ensured these were bought by writing to The Gentleman's Magazine. Over 600 books were sold by subscription and a second printing enabled Richardson to open a small school. Another edition was printed in the USA.

By 1809 the school was gone and Richardson was ill. Cappe had a second book of poetry published titled Poems Chiefly Composed during the Pressure of Severe Illness (1809).

Richardson died in Acomb, North Yorkshire in 1825. Her poetry refers to her thoughts on French invasion, the slave trade and her reading of Thomas Clarkson and Walter Scott.
