= Nicholas Gatty =

English composer and music critic (1874–1946)

Nicholas Comyn Gatty (13 September 1874 – 10 November 1946) was an English composer and music critic. As a composer his major output was opera, which was generally regarded as musically undistinguished but well-presented theatrically. As a critic he worked for the Pall Mall Gazette and The Times, and served as assistant editor for the second and third editions of Grove.

He was born in Bradfield, Yorkshire, the second son of the Revd Reginald Gatty, and the nephew of composer Alfred Scott-Gatty. He was educated at Downing College, Cambridge (BA 1896, Mus B 1898, Mus D 1927) and at the Royal College of Music where he studied under Charles Villiers Stanford. From the beginning of the 20th century he was assistant conductor at Covent Garden, and at some time organist to the Duke of York's Royal Military School in Chelsea. At Grove's Dictionary of Music he wrote many anonymous contributions under the editors Fuller Maitland and H C Colles.

His compositions include the operas Prince Ferelon (1919) written to his own libretto, which was published as part of the Carnegie Collection of British Music and was staged at the Old Vic in 1921, and The Tempest, (composed in 1914, with a libretto adapted by his brother René (Reginald Arthur Allix Gatty) which followed at the Old Vic in 1922. Edward Dent found in The Tempest "a wonderful Purcellian beauty". Gatty's orchestral Concert Allegro for piano and orchestra was premiered at the Proms on 6 October 1903 and his ambitious choral and orchestral work Fly, envious time (setting Milton's "Ode on Time") was commissioned for the 1905 Sheffield Festival. The Shropshire Songbook, folksong arrangements made by Gatty and Alan Gray, was published in 1922.

Gatty was a close contemporary and friend of Ralph Vaughan Williams, and from around 1900 the latter was to spend summer holidays with the Gattys at Hooton Roberts, between Rotherham and Doncaster, where Gatty's father was rector. He died in London, aged 72.

The Nicolas Gatty archive is held at the University of Exeter.

== List of works ==
- Variations on Old King Cole for orchestra (1899)
- Concert Allegro for piano and orchestra (Proms, 1903)
- Fly, envious time, chorus and orchestra (1905)
- Greysteel, opera (Moody-Manners Company, 1906)
- Duke or Devil, opera (Moody-Manners Company, 1909)
- Prince Ferelon, opera (1910) (first public performance, Old Vic, May 1921)
- The Tempest, opera (1914) (first performance, Surrey Theatre, April 1920)
- The Shropshire Songbook, folksong arrangements (1922)
- King Alfred and the Cakes, light opera (Royal College of Music, 1930)
- Piano Trio in Ab (unpublished)
