= Faith Gray =

- Born: 31 January 1751; York
- Died: 20 December 1826 (aged 75); Grays Court, York
- Education: at home
- Known for: Improving education in York
- Spouse: William Gray

Faith Gray born Faith Hopwood (31 January 1751 – 20 December 1826) was a British diarist and school founder who, with Catharine Cappe, improved education in York for poor girls and at the Grey (now Blue) Coat School.

== Life ==
Gray was born in York. She was the first of seven children born to Margaret (born Batty) and her husband Jonathan Hopwood. In 1765, when she was fourteen, she began the diaries that made her notable. She recorded how she spent her time reading and sewing with her mother whilst her brothers also read, but learnt languages.

In 1777 on 9 October she married William Gray who was training to be a solicitor. Her parents were worried that she might become a Methodist. William managed to save the family firm from the poor position he found it in, albeit at the cost of working long hours. Together they would have seven children.

In 1782 she began an enterprise with Catharine Cappe. They created evening classes so that the workers at a local hemp factory could learn to read there and at Sunday School each week. With Cappe, Gray established in 1784 a School for Spinning Worsted in York, offering an education for girls. The school was staffed by women volunteers and the girls were taught to read and to spin and in return the student's were paid wages for their work and clothed. Cappe wrote that the purpose was to "excite a spirit of virtuous industry among the children of the poor". The parents were keen because they were clothed as the students were taught how to create garments from the yarn they had spun. Given this education, the students were able to apply for better paid work and avoid the options usually open to poor uneducated girls.

After their success with poor girls, Gray was approached to become involved with the Grey Coat School in York which had lost its way. She wrote tactical notes to the (male) governors of the school. The master of the school had been deemed unfit and his wife was mentally ill. The Ladies's Committee were allowed to take over the school's management. She and Faith Gray founded the York Female Friendly Society in 1788. The society was open to ex-students of the Grey Coat School and to their "School for Spinning Worsted". The society's object was to provide basic health insurance for its members.

In 1788 Cappe married and became "Catharine Cappe" and Gray moved into a new home with her husband which would be named "Gray's Court". The purchase was possible as Faith's father had left them a bequest in 1784.

== Death and legacy ==
Gray died in the family home of Grays Court in York in 1826.

The York Female Friendly Society continued to operate until 1976 and members continued to meet socially until 1984.
