= Alan Gray =

English organist and composer

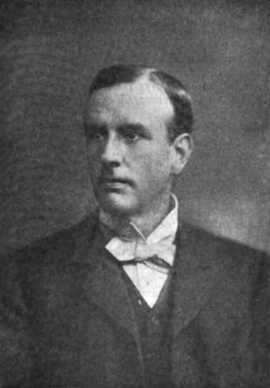
- Born: 23 December 1855; York, Yorkshire, England
- Died: 27 September 1935 (aged 79); Cambridge, Cambridgeshire, England
- Occupations: Organist, composer

Alan Gray (23 December 1855 – 27 September 1935) was an English organist and composer.

== Life and career ==
Gray was born in into a well-known York family (the Grays of Grays Court). His father William Gray was a solicitor and (in 1844) Lord Mayor of York. His brother Edwin Gray (c 1847-1929) became Lord Mayor of York in 1897, and again in 1902.

Alan Gray attended St Peter's School and initially trained as a solicitor, qualifying in 1881. But after musical studies with Edwin G Monk at York Minster he turned to music, studying as an undergraduate at Trinity College, Cambridge, where Charles Villiers Stanford came across him. From 1883 until 1893 he was Director of Music at Wellington College. Other staff members in the music department at the same time were A H Fox Strangways and Hugh Allen.

In 1893 he returned to Cambridge to be organist at Trinity College and conductor of the Cambridge University Musical Society, succeeding Stanford. One of his organ pupils was Ralph Vaughan Williams. He remained there until 1930. He did important work as an editor for the Purcell Society. The Shropshire Songbook, a book of arrangements made by Gray and Nicholas Gatty from folksongs collected by W H Leslie, was published in 1922.

Gray was described in his Times obituary as "a magnificent organist [and] skilful improviser". Known as "long Alan" by his contemporaries, he was 6 foot six inches tall and had a wide range of intellectual interests beyond music. In 1887 he married Maude Vickers (sister of suffragist and social reformer Almyra Vickers, who married Gray's older brother Edwin) and there were three sons: Basil, Maurice and Edward. During the First World War he was badly affected, losing two of his three sons (Maurice and Edward) towards the end of the conflict. He died at his home, 10 Chaucer Road, Cambridge aged 79. His wife continued to live there until her own death in 1953.

== Music ==
Among his compositions are liturgical music for Morning and Evening Prayer and the Office of Holy Communion for use in the Church of England according to the Book of Common Prayer: the Magnificat and Nunc dimittis in F minor for double choir (1912); a setting of Holy Communion in G; and several anthems. There is also a collection of descants to various hymn tunes published in 1920, several of which are still in use today (Common Praise [2000] includes four). His other works include five cantatas for chorus and orchestra (set to religious and secular texts), chamber and instrumental music, and organ music including four sonatas

During the war Gray composed a cycle of three partsongs setting Rupert Brooke entitled 1914, as well as an Elegy (1915) for organ and strings (or solo organ) in memory of the composer W C Denis Browne, who had been the organ scholar at Clare College, Cambridge and who died in action in 1915. Perhaps his best known piece, What are these that glow from afar? (1928, words Christina Rossetti), was composed in memory of his sons lost in the war. The anthem uses a quotation from the plainsong tune of Jesu dulcis memoria to great effect.

The Magnificat and Nunc dimittis has been recorded by the Westminster Abbey Choir, conducted by James O'Donnell. The 1914 partsongs - 'Peace', 'The Dead', and 'The Soldier' - have been recorded by Truro Cathedral Choir. Barry Rose and the Guildford Cathedral Choir also recorded 'The Dead' and 'The Soldier'. John Kitchen has recorded the Organ Sonata No 2.

== Compositions ==
- The Widow of Zarephath, cantata (York, 1888)
- Organ Sonata No 2 (1890)
- Arethusa, cantata (Leeds, 1892)
- Easter Ode, choral (1892)
- The Rover, SATB (1892), Musical Times supplement)
- The Legend of the Rock Buoy Bell, cantata (Hovingham, 1893)
- Fantasia in D minor for organ (1894)
- Festival Te Deum (1895)
- The Vision of Belshazzar, cantata (Hovingham, 1896)
- A Song of Redemption, cantata (Leeds, 1898)
- Andante and Allegro for piano trio (1903)
- Odysseus in Phaeacia, cantata (1906)
- Dixit Dominous, a cappella chorus (1910)
- Crossing the Bar, SATB a cappella (1912)
- Evening Service in F minor (Magnificat and Nunc dimittis) for double choir (1912)
- 1914, partsongs (1914)
- Elegy for organ and strings (1915)
- What are these that glow from afar?, anthem (1915)
- Recessional for organ (1916)
- Christ Will Gather In His Own, SATB a cappella anthem (1918)
- Requiem (1918)
- Come Though, Holy Spirit, SATB anthem (1919)
- Lux Aeterna for orchestra (1919)
- Andante grazioso for organ (1922)
- Piano Quartet
- String Quartet
- Violin Sonata
- Adagio and Toccata for organ
- Fantasy in G minor for organ
- Four Organ Sonatas
- Four idylls for organ
- Ground for organ
- The Little Organ Book in memory of Parry
- Variations for organ
- sets of short preludes and postludes

Cultural offices
Preceded by Charles Villiers Stanford	Organist and Master of the Choristers of Trinity College, Cambridge; 1893-1930	Succeeded by Hubert Stanley Middleton
