= Almyra Gray =

British social reformer (1862–1939)

Almyra Vickers Gray
- by W P Glaisby of York
- Born: Allie Vickers; 15 March 1862; Sheffield, England
- Died: 6 November 1939 (aged 77); Grays Court, York, England
- Other names: Almira Gray
- Occupation: campaigner
- Spouse: Edwin Gray
- Parent(s): Albert Vickers; Helen Horton

Almyra Vickers Gray or Almyra Gray JP (15 March 1862 – 6 November 1939) was a British suffragist and social reformer. She was twice Lady Mayoress of York and an early woman Justice of the Peace in 1920.

== Early life ==
Almyra Vickers Gray was born in Sheffield into the influential Vickers family. She was first called Allie. She was the first child of Albert Vickers (1838–1919) and his American wife Helen Horton. She became Lady Mayoress of York when her husband Edwin Gray first became Lord Mayor of York in 1897. She would serve again in 1902.

== Activist ==
In 1907 she was elected President of the National Union of Women Workers. In 1909 she attended the Fifth Conference of the International Woman Suffrage Alliance in London.

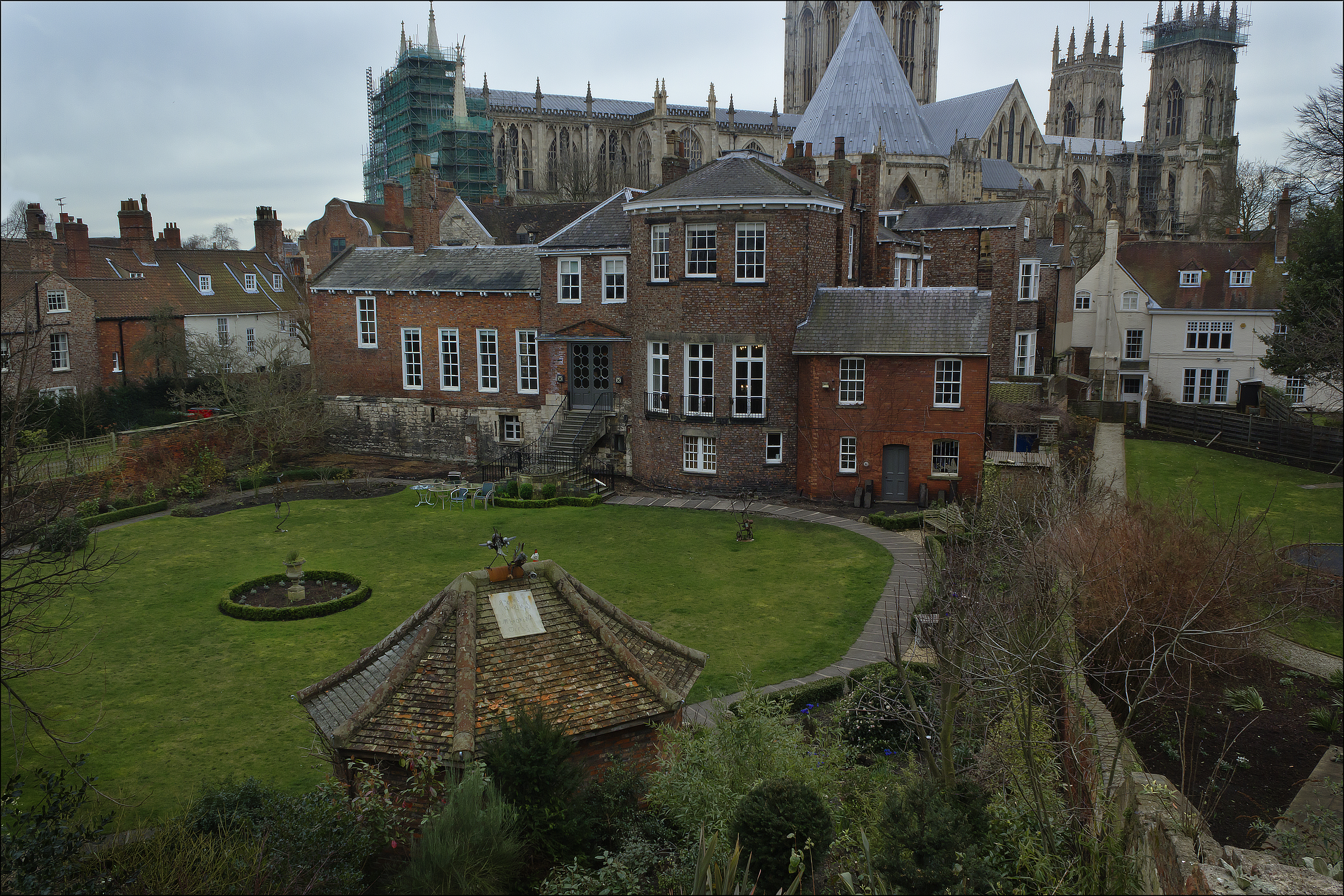
her garden and house

She lobbied for improved maternity services and infant welfare to reduce child mortality. In 1913 she became president of the North and East Riding Federation of the National Union of Women's Suffrage Societies.

In 1920 she was one of the first women Justice of the Peaces in the country and the first in York. She worked initially in the juvenile courts.

In 1925, a memorial was unveiled at York Minster, recording the names of over 1,500 women who died in World War I. The money for the memorial was raised by Helen Little and, independently, by Gray. It was speculated that the memorial was approved by the Dean of the cathedral because of the need to restore the Five Sisters window that had been removed in 1916 for protection against enemy bombs.

In 1927, Shelson Press published a book of Gray's writings entitled Papers and diaries of a York family 1764-1839. The book includes details of the family who lived at her house, Grays Court, York.

== Personal life ==
In 1882 she married Edwin Gray in Paddington. (Her sister Maude Vickers (c 1865–1953) married Edwin's brother, the composer Alan Gray, in 1887). They had a daughter Helen, and adopted a son. Edwin died on 6 November 1929. Almyra died at Grays Court ten years later.
