= Harting Old Club =

British friendly society

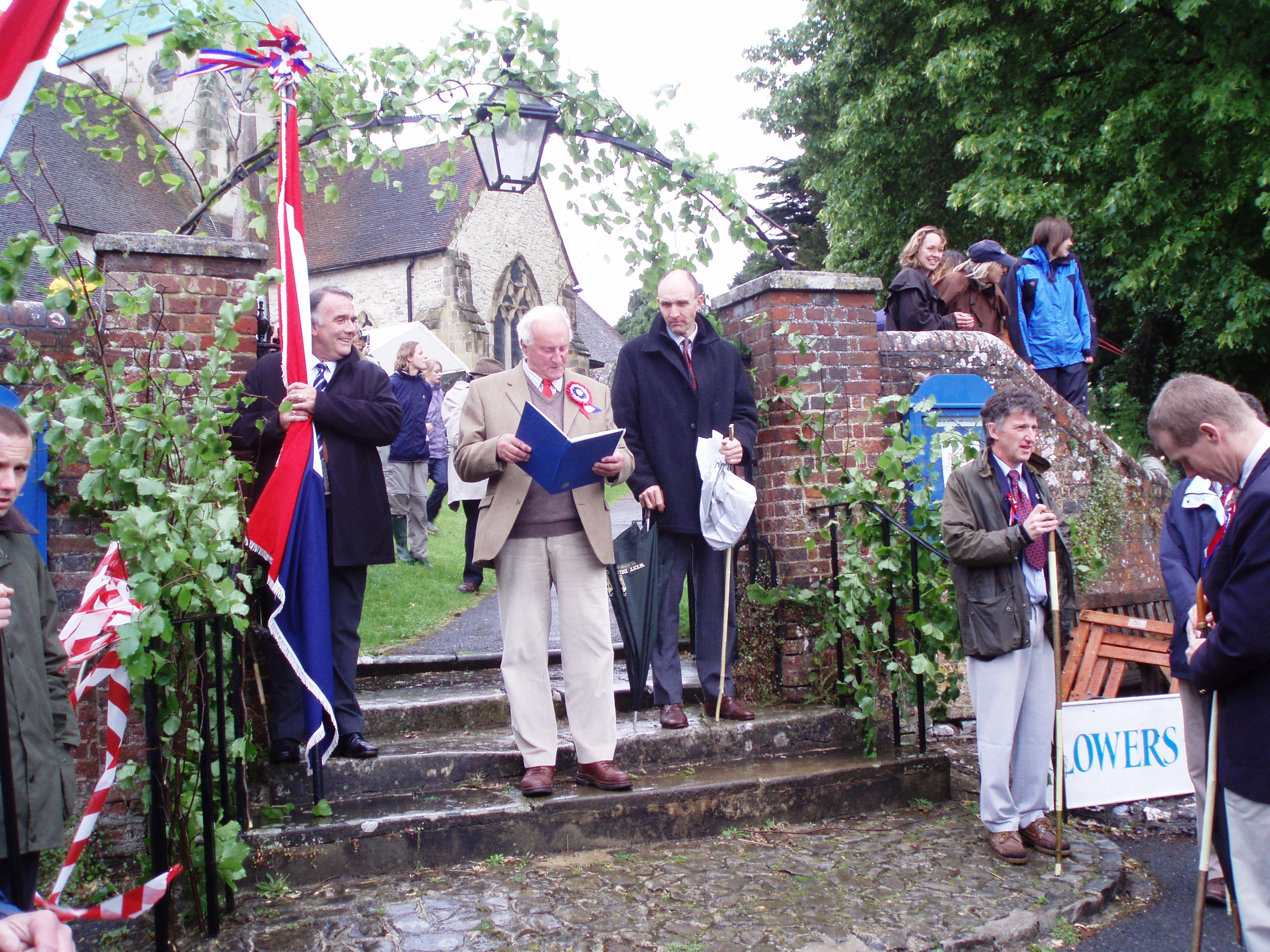
Humphrey Sladden, the club secretary, calls the roll in 2007.

The Harting Old Club is a British friendly society, originating in the village of South Harting, West Sussex, and dating back to at least 1800, but in probability at least another 75 years before that. Every Whit Monday the members parade outside St Gabriel's church at 11 o'clock where the secretary calls the roll. The club members then march up and down the high street to the accompaniment of a brass band. (Note: In 1956 the British Council commissioned a study to show life in a typical English village: the resulting film shows that year's festivities.) In their hand they carry a hazel wand, and on their lapel they wear a red, blue and white rosette. Following a short service the (all male) members retire to enjoy a feast. (Note: Richard Jeffries, writing to The Times in 1872, gazed in wonderment at the 5 course banquet.)
