= Newcome Cappe =

English unitarian divine (1733–1800)

- Born: 21 February 1733; Leeds, Yorkshire, England, UK
- Died: 24 December 1800 (aged 67); York, Yorkshire, England, UK
- Spouses: Sarah Turner (m. 1759; died 1773) Catharine Harrison (m. 1788; died 1800)
- Children: 6+

Newcome Cappe (21 February 1733 – 24 December 1800), was an English unitarian divine. He served as the pastor of the York Unitarian Chapel, located in York, England. Cappe published various sermons and after his death his second wife, Catharine Cappe published many more.

== Life ==
He was born at Leeds, in Yorkshire, the eldest son of the Rev. Joseph Cappe, minister of the nonconformist congregation at Mill Hill Chapel, Leeds, who married the daughter and coheiress of Mr. Newcome of Waddington, Lincolnshire. He was educated for the dissenting ministry. For a year (1748–49) he was with John Aikin at Kibworth, Leicestershire; then for three years he studied with Philip Doddridge at Northampton, East Midlands, and for three more years (1752–55) he lived in Glasgow, as a student of William Leechman.

Cappe was chosen in November 1755 as the co-pastor with the Rev. John Hotham of the chapel at St. Saviourgate, York. After Hotham's death the following May, Cappe became the sole pastor to the congregation and remained in this position until his death. In politics he was a reformer and supporter of the Yorkshire Association, and in theology, while brought up in the orthodox Independent tradition, he followed Joseph Priestley and was of Unitarian views. In 1783 he supported the Society for Promoting the Knowledge of the Scriptures.

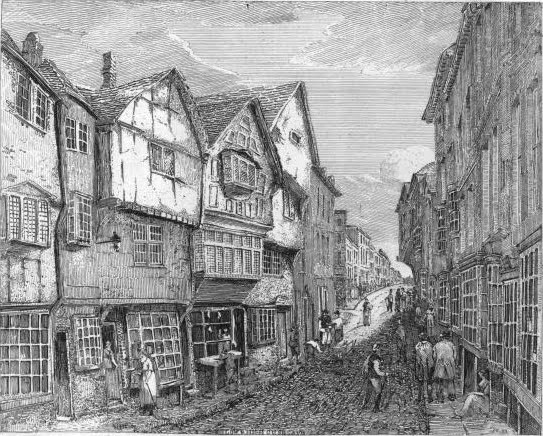
Low and High Ousegate, 1813 engraving of York

The large house in Upper Ousegate in which he lived was described by Robert Davies, in his Walks through York, and in it he gathered together men of letters. A literary club which he founded in 1771 existed for nearly twenty years.

In later life, Cappe was frequently ill, and in 1791 he suffered a paralytic stroke. It was followed by other attacks until his strength failed, and he died at York. Charles Wellbeloved had taken over his duties, as assistant, in 1792.

== Works ==
The writings of Cappe which appeared during his lifetime were quite slight. When Theophilus Lindsey left the Church of England in 1773, he published a Farewel Address, which was attacked by William Cooper as "Erasmus" in a letter to Etherington's York Chronicle in January 1774. The first reply to Cooper in the Chronicle was from Cappe, as "A Lover of good men", even if Lindsey and Joseph Priestley took it to be from another ally, William Turner. In 1783, Cappe printed a pamphlet of Remarks in Vindication of Dr. Priestley in answer to attacks in The Monthly Review. During the period of the American Revolutionary War, there were sermons preached on the days "of national humiliation" in 1776, 1780, 1781, 1782 and 1784. They had a pro-American tone.

An earlier sermon delivered 27 November 1757, after the victory of Frederick the Great at the battle of Rossbach on 5 November 1757, was an exercise in rhetoric, and passed through numerous editions. In 1770, Cappe published a sermon in memory of the Rev. Edward Sandercock, and in 1785, he published his sermons.

A Selection of Psalms for Social Worship and An Alphabetical Explication of some Terms and Phrases in Scripture, the first an anonymous publication, and the second "by a warm well-wisher to the interests of genuine christianity", were printed at York in 1786, and are known to have been compiled by Cappe. The second of them was reissued in Boston, Massachusetts, in 1818. A more elaborate work, Discourses on the Providence and Government of God, was published by him in 1795; a second edition appeared in 1811, and a third in 1818.

After Cappe's death, his widow Catharine collected and edited his discourses, consisting of:

- Critical Remarks on many important Passages of Scripture, 1802, 2 vols.
- Discourses chiefly on Devotional Subjects, 1805
- Connected History of the Life and Divine Mission of Jesus Christ, 1809
- Discourses chiefly on Practical Subjects 1815

To the first and second of these publications she prefixed her own memoirs of his life. The second contained an appendix of a sermon on his interment by William Wood, and a memoir from the Monthly Review February 1801, pp. 81–4, by Charles Wellbeloved.

== Family ==
In October 1759, Cappe married Sarah, the eldest daughter of William Turner, a merchant of Hull, East Yorkshire. She died of consumption (tuberculosis) in the spring of 1773, leaving six children behind her. His second wife, a promoter of female education and of Unitarian principles, was Catharine Harrison, and they were married at Barwick-in-Elmet, Leeds, on 19 February 1788. She was the author of tracts on charity schools, and the benefactor of the poet Charlotte Richardson. (Note: For Newcome's widow, see Unitarianism, Philanthropy and Feminism in York, 1782–1821: The Career of Catherine Cappe by Helen Plant. York: University of York, Borthwick Paper 103, 2003.)

His eldest son, Joseph Cappe, M.D., died in February 1791; his youngest son, Robert Cappe, M.D., died on 16 November 1802 while on a voyage to Livorno, Tuscany.

== Notes ==
Attribution

This article incorporates text from a publication now in the public domain: Stephen, Leslie, ed. (1887). "Cappe, Newcome". Dictionary of National Biography. Vol. 9. London: Smith, Elder & Co.
