= Blue Coat School, York =

English charity school for boys, 1705–1947

Blue Coat School
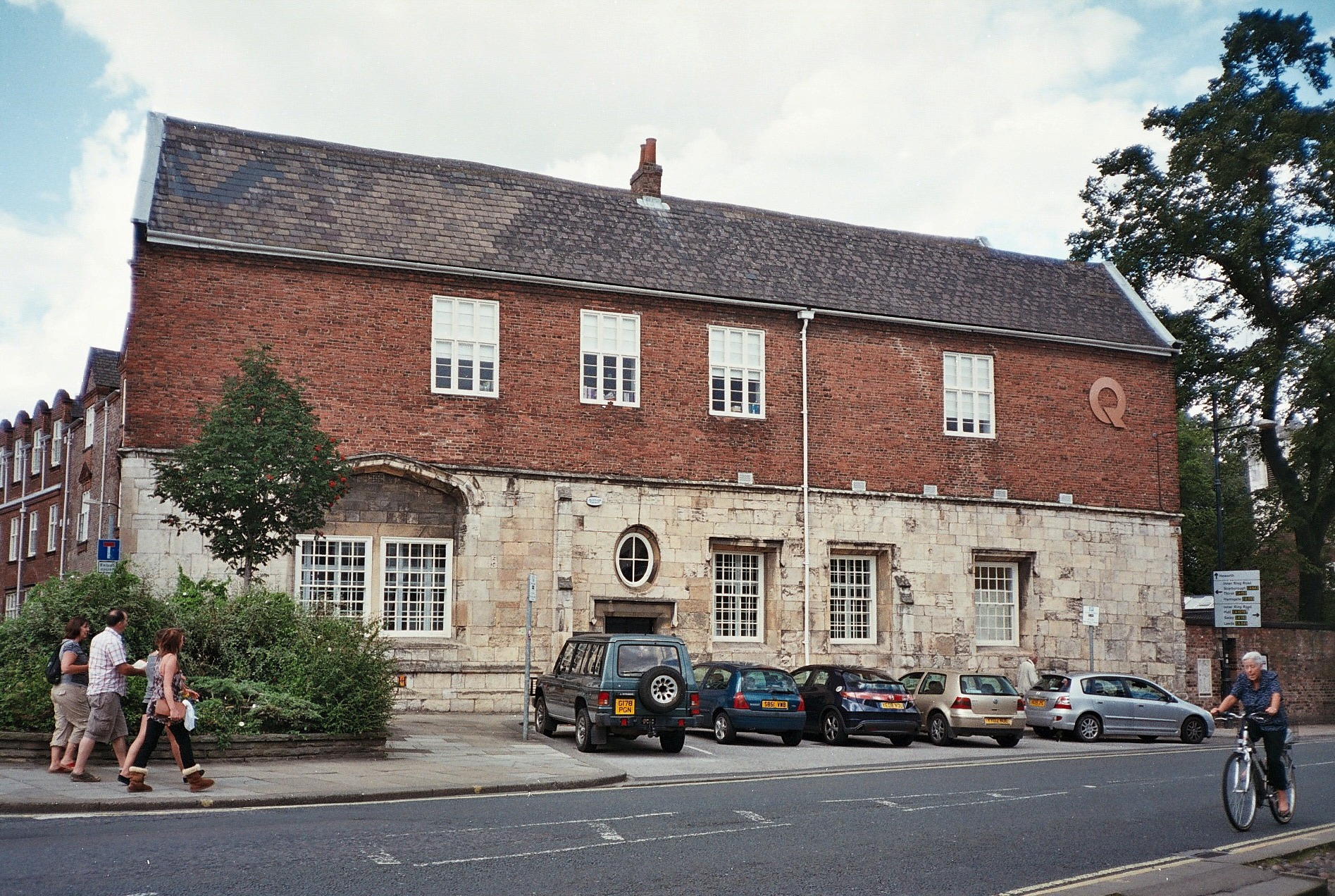
- St Anthony's Hall, the York Blue Coat School from 1705 until 1947

Location
- St Anthony's Hall, York; England
- Coordinates: 53.961°N 1.075°W

Information
- Type: Charity school
- Established: 1705
- Founder: City of York Corporation
- Closed: 1947
- Enrolment: 64 (1836)

The Blue Coat School in York, England, was founded in 1705 as a charity school for forty poor boys. There was a smaller school for girls known as the Grey Coat School, York.

== History ==
The school was founded by the City of York Corporation, who initially provided and furnished a medieval guild hall, St Anthony's Hall, on Peasholme Green, for use as the school building. The blue coats worn by the boys were based on the uniform of Christ's Hospital School in Greyfriars, London. A Grey Coat School for twenty poor girls was founded at the same time in Marygate. By 1836, the boys' school housed sixty-four pupils, and there were forty-three girls at the Grey Coat School. Supporters who donated more than a guinea a year were allowed to put forward the name of one boy and one girl to enter each school.

== The Grey Coat School ==
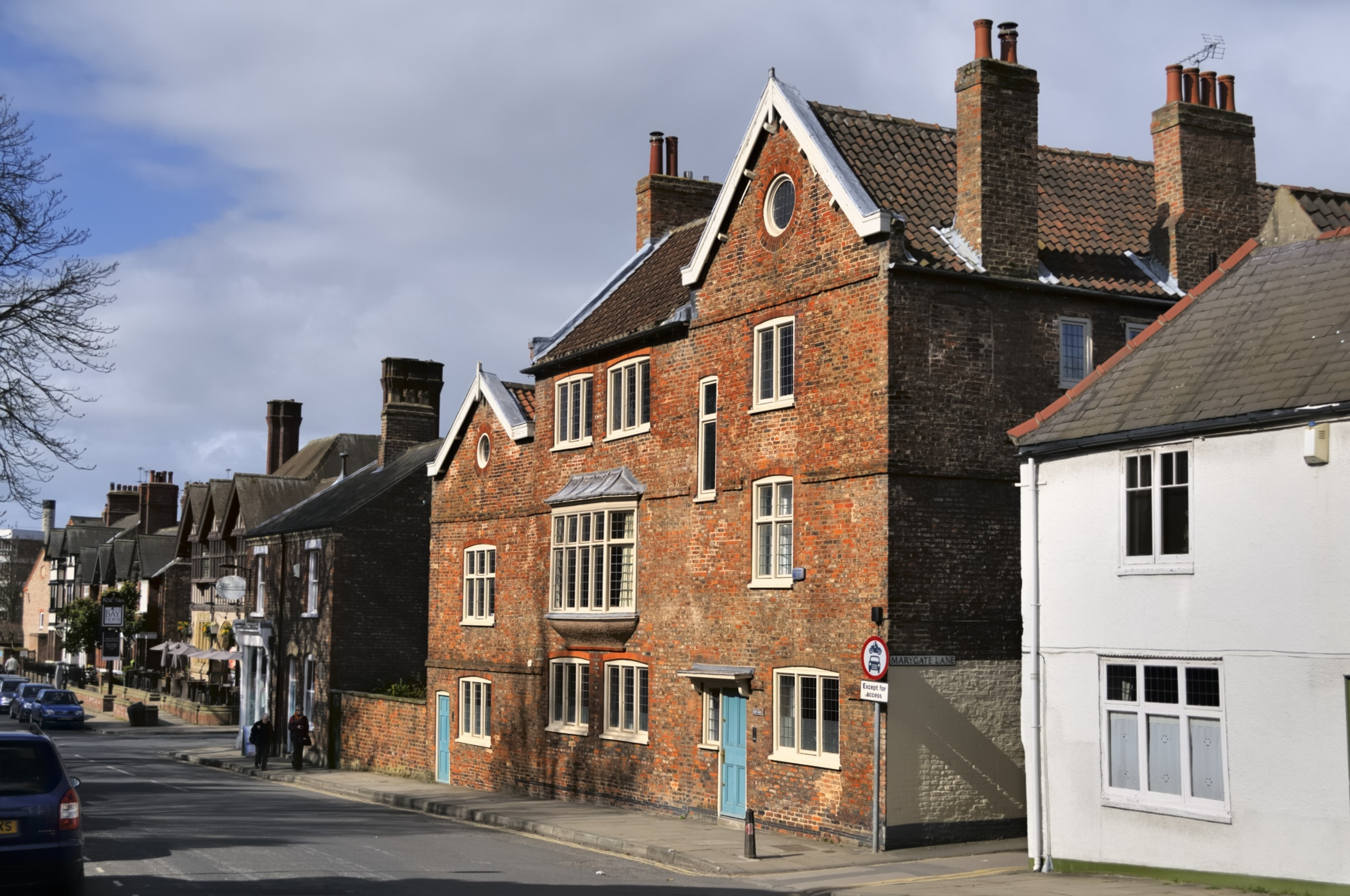
The Grey Coat School in Marygate was founded here in 1705

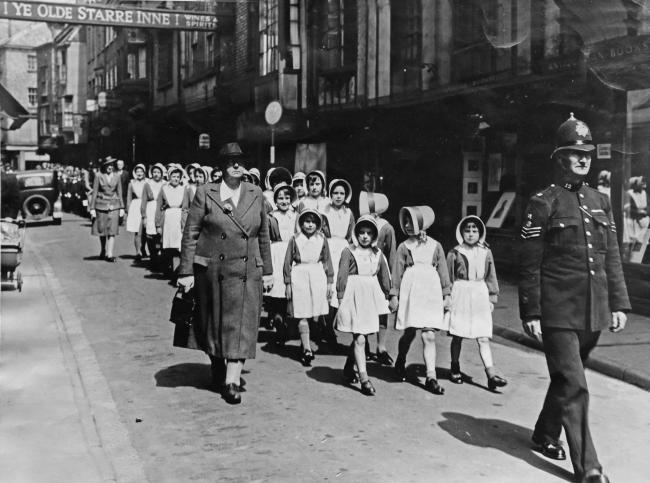
June 1944 Grey Coat School anniversary parade down Stonegate

The Grey Coat School was created in 1705 at "The Garth" in Marygate. It moved to 33, Monkgate. The girls were trained in sewing and knitting and prepared for a career as a servant.

In 1782 Faith Gray and Catharine Cappe created evening classes so that local hemp factory workers could learn to read. With Cappe, Gray and Cappe established in 1784 a School for Spinning Worsted in York, offering an education for girls.

After this success, Gray was approached to become involved with the "Grey Coat School" which had lost its way. She wrote notes to the (male) governors of the school. The master of the school had been deemed unfit and his wife was mentally ill. Cappe and Gray's Ladies's Committee were allowed to take over the school's management. Cappe and Gray went on to found the York Female Friendly Society which was open to ex-students of the Grey Coat School and to their "School for Spinning Worsted". The society's object was to provide basic health insurance for its female members.

Until 1900 the girls would be taught spinning and their work was sold to supplement the home's income.

== Closure ==
The school suffered some bomb damage in the Second World War. After the war, the Education Act 1944 established a number of categories for state schools. Neither the boys' nor the girls' school fell into any of the new categories, and they both closed in 1947. However the girl's continued to be housed in a Grey Coat Home although their schooling was at normal schools. This home continued until 1983 but it was amalgamated with another in 1969.

== Former pupils ==
Moses B. Cotsworth: accountant, railway statistician, calendar reformer
