= Fifehead Magdalen =

Village and civil parish in Dorset, England

Coordinates: 50.9926°N 2.3133°W

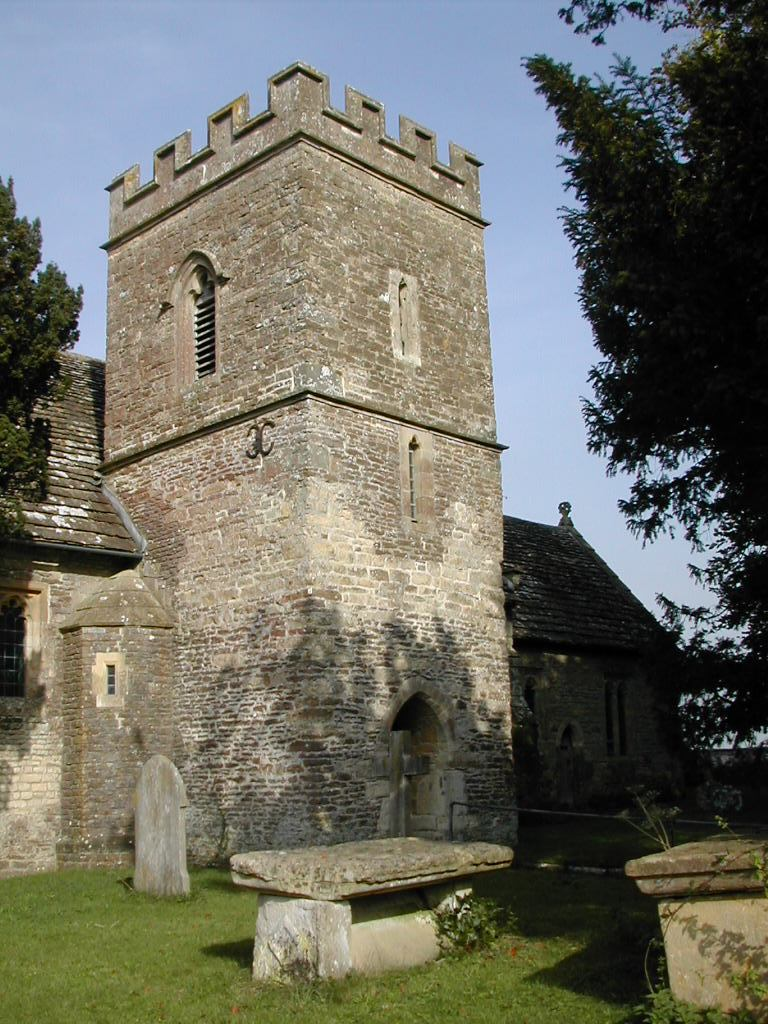
- Parish church of St Mary Magdalene

- Location within Dorset
- Population: 80
- OS grid reference: ST782215
- Unitary authority: Dorset
- Ceremonial county: Dorset
- Region: South West
- Country: England
- Sovereign state: United Kingdom
- Post town: Gillingham
- Postcode district: SP8
- Police: Dorset
- Fire: Dorset and Wiltshire
- Ambulance: South Western
- UK Parliament: North Dorset

Fifehead Magdalen is a small village and civil parish in the county of Dorset in southern England. It lies within the Blackmore Vale, about three miles (five kilometres) south-southwest of Gillingham and five miles (eight kilometres) west of Shaftesbury. It is sited on Corallian limestone soil and surrounded by Oxford Clay, about 1/4 mile (400 metres) from the west bank of the River Stour. Its name means "the place of five hides dedicated to [St] Magdalene". In 2013 the estimated population of the parish was 80. The village was a venue for stave dances.

== Parish Church of St. Mary Magdalene ==
The Parish Church, dedicated to St. Mary Magdalene after whom the village is named, dates mostly from the 14th century. However its most striking feature is the small "Newman chapel" built onto the north side of the nave sometime around 1693. It is believed to cover a vault containing the mortal remains of several members of the Newman family who were Lords there for many centuries. At first the family leased the Fifehead Tudor manor house from the Abbey of St Augustine's of Bristol, perhaps since 1408, but then bought the estate in the early 15th century. The chapel was almost certainly commissioned by Col. Richard Newman (1620–1695) whose father Richard (1584–1664) and grandfather Thomas (d.1649) are memorialised on plaques mounted on the chapel's east wall, and whose son Richard (1650–1682) who predeceased him, is memorialised on the west wall.

On the north wall of the chapel is a later and much larger monument to Richard's grandson Sir Richard Newman of Fifehead, Preston Hall and Evercreech (1676–1721), his wife Frances, his son Sir Samwell Newman (c.1696–1747) and three daughters, Frances, Barbara and Elizabeth. This magnificent monument was created by the famous Westminster sculptor Sir Henry Cheere and dates from between 1747 (when Sir Samwell Newman died) and 1763 (when his sister Barbara died).

In the churchyard, nearby the entrance gate, is the tombstone of Thomas Newman who died in April 1668, believed to be the great-uncle of Sir Richard Newman.

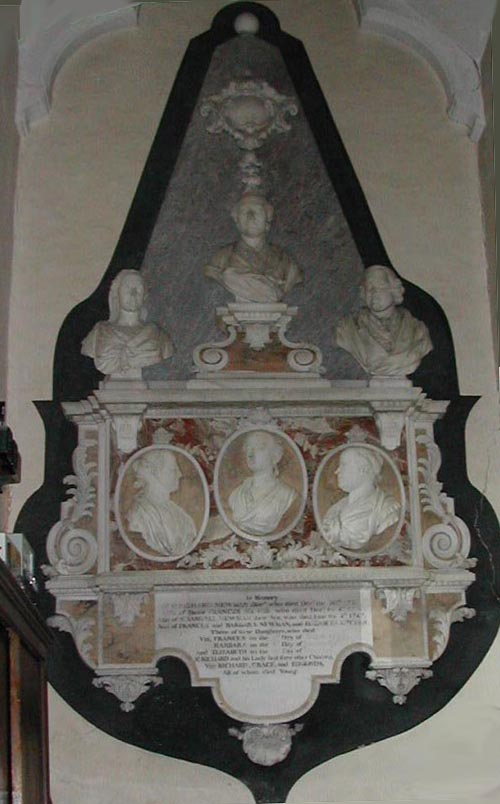
Funerary memorial to Sir Richard Newman (1676–1721) and his family, on the north wall of the Newman Chapel, Fifehead Magdalen parish church

== Notable residents ==
- Sir William Erle
