= Stourton Caundle =

Village and civil parish in Dorset, England

Coordinates: 50.9343°N 2.4078°W

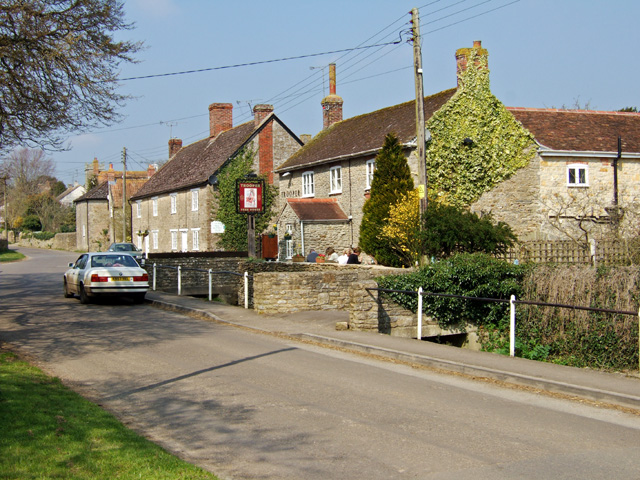
- Village street, Stourton Caundle

- Location within Dorset
- Population: 439
- OS grid reference: ST714152
- Unitary authority: Dorset
- Ceremonial county: Dorset
- Region: South West
- Country: England
- Sovereign state: United Kingdom
- Post town: Sturminster Newton
- Postcode district: DT10
- Police: Dorset
- Fire: Dorset and Wiltshire
- Ambulance: South Western
- UK Parliament: North Dorset

Stourton Caundle (/ˈstɜːrtən ˈkɔːndəl/) is a village and civil parish in the county of Dorset in southwest England. It lies within the Blackmore Vale, about five miles (eight kilometres) east of Sherborne. In the 2011 census the parish had 181 households and a population of 439.

Stourton Caundle is one of several settlements in the area to bear the name "Caundle", the others being Bishop's Caundle, Purse Caundle and Caundle Marsh. The origin of "Caundle" is uncertain. In the Domesday Book in 1086 there are seven Domesday entries connected to the village, recorded as "Candelle", "Candel" or "Candele" in the hundred of Brunsell. The entries record a total of 45 households and a total taxable value of 17 geld units. Sir Henry de Haddon, a lord from Northamptonshire, bought land and founded a manor here in 1202, and the resultant settlement was called "Caundel Haddon" or "Caundle Haddon". The Haddons retained the manor until 1461 when it passed to the Stourton family, which resulted in the current village name.

The manor was on the west side of the main village street and was probably fortified, resulting in it being referred to as a 'castle', though only a thirteenth-century chapel building (no longer used as such) and two fish ponds associated with the site now remain.

Stourton Caundle's parish church is dedicated to St Peter and has a thirteenth-century nave and chancel, and a fourteenth-century tower.

The village was once a venue for stave dancing.

The village has a small pub called The Trooper, but villagers must travel to local town Stalbridge for other amenities.

Enid Blyton used Manor Farm as inspiration for her novel Five on Finniston Farm. She owned the farm for a short time in the late 1950s.
