= Catharine Cappe =

British writer, diarist and philanthropist (1744–1821)

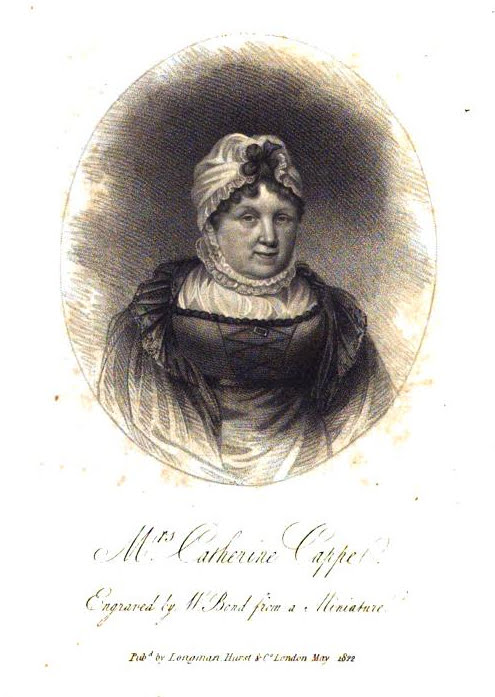
- 1822 engraving from Memoirs of the Life of the Late Mrs. Catharine Cappe
- Born: 3 June 1744; Long Preston
- Died: 27 July 1821 (aged 77); York

Catherine Cappe or Catherine Harrison (3 June 1744 – 27 July 1821) was a British writer, diarist and philanthropist.

== Life ==
She was born Catharine Harrison in Long Preston in 1744, daughter of the clergyman Jeremiah Harrison, an associate of Francis Blackburne, who was incumbent there, and later at Catterick, and his wife Sarah Winn, daughter of Edmund Winn. She was educated in York, with time at a boarding school where her studies included French.

Harrison moved away from the Church of England under the influence of the free thinker Theophilus Lindsey, who had taken over her father Jeremiah's ministry at the Church of St Anne, Catterick after he died in 1763. She then went to live in Bedale, some miles from Catterick, with her mother and brother, visiting Lindsey often. She became a rational dissenter. Lindsey in 1773 founded his own Unitarian chapel in London. Catharine found his departure distressing.

In 1782 she began an enterprise with Faith Gray who was a solicitor's wife in York. Between the two of them they created evening classes so that the workers at a local hemp factory could learn to read there and at Sunday School each week. With Faith Gray, Catharine Harrison established in 1784 a School for Spinning Worsted in York, offering an education for girls. The school was staffed by women volunteers and the girls were taught to read and to spin and in return the student's were paid wages for their work and clothed. Cappe wrote that the purpose was to "excite a spirit of virtuous industry among the children of the poor". The parents were keen because they were clothed as the students were taught how to create garments from the yarn they had spun. Given this education they were able to apply for better paid work and avoid the options usually open to poor uneducated girls.

She and Gray were enthusiastic in reforming education at the Grey Coat School in York, where from 1786 the Ladies's Committee she headed took over management, and wrote about assisting other charity schools. She and Faith Gray founded the York Female Friendly Society and she married in 1788, becoming Catharine Cappe. She was widowed in 1800. She also tried to establish visitors to her local hospital. She had no ambition to vote but she felt that middle class women had a duty to inspect female sections of charities.

Catharine Cappe was the benefactor of Charlotte Richardson, whom she knew from her time at school, and through her brother as the family's doctor. Impressed by Richardson's poetry, she arranged for Poems on Different Occasions to be published in 1806, also promoting the work through The Gentleman's Magazine. Over 600 books were sold by subscription, and a second printing enabled Richardson to open a small school.

Catharine Cappe died in York in 1821.

== Works ==
As an editor, Cappe collected volumes of her husband's discourses after his death, placing forewords in the 1802 and 1805 publications consisting of her memoirs of her husband. Amongst her own works are:

- An Account of Two Charity Schools for the Educations of Girls, 1800. She returned to the same subjects, with Observations on Charity Schools, Female Friendly Societies, and Other Subjects Connected with the Views of the Ladies Committee (1805), after an approach from the London philanthropic "Ladies' Committee for promoting the Education and Employment of the Female Poor", that had been set up in 1804 with the support of Queen Charlotte of Mecklenburg-Strelitz.
- Critical Remarks on many important Passages of Scripture, 1802, 2 vols.
- Discourses chiefly on Devotional Subjects, 1805
- Connected History of the Life and Divine Mission of Jesus Christ, 1809
- Discourses on the providence and government of God 2nd ed., 1811
- Remarks on Apprenticing Female Children on Their Leaving a Charity-School, Belfast Monthly Magazine no.9, 1812
- Memoirs of Mrs. Lindsey Belfast Monthly Magazine no.8, 1812
- Discourses chiefly on Practical Subjects 1815
- Memoirs of the life of the late Mrs. Catharine Cappe, 1824. published by her stepdaughter Mary Cappe.

== Family ==
Catharine Harrison married Newcome Cappe, a Unitarian minister, as his second wife, in 1788; he died in 1800. They had no children of their own, but there were six children, including daughters Mary and Agnes, from his first marriage to Sarah Turner (died 1773).

Sarah Winn, Catharine's mother, was daughter of Edmund Winn of Ackton. According to Dugdale's Visitation of Yorkshire, he was the second son of Sir Edmund Winn, 2nd Baronet. Sir Rowland Winn, 4th Baronet gave Catherine support after her father's death; and she nursed his daughter Anne Winn (died 1774), who had married George Allanson-Winn, 1st Baron Headley, in her last illness. It took her to London, where she stayed for a time after Anne's death, caring for her small daughter, and finding time to attend Essex Street Chapel.

Through relations on her mother's side, Catharine was also acquainted with another Yorkshire gentry family, that of Sir George Strickland, 5th Baronet.

Her father Jeremiah Harrison was son of Christopher Harrison of Ripon, and matriculated at Christ Church, Oxford in 1722, aged 15.
