= Friendly society =

Mutual association for a common financial or social purpose

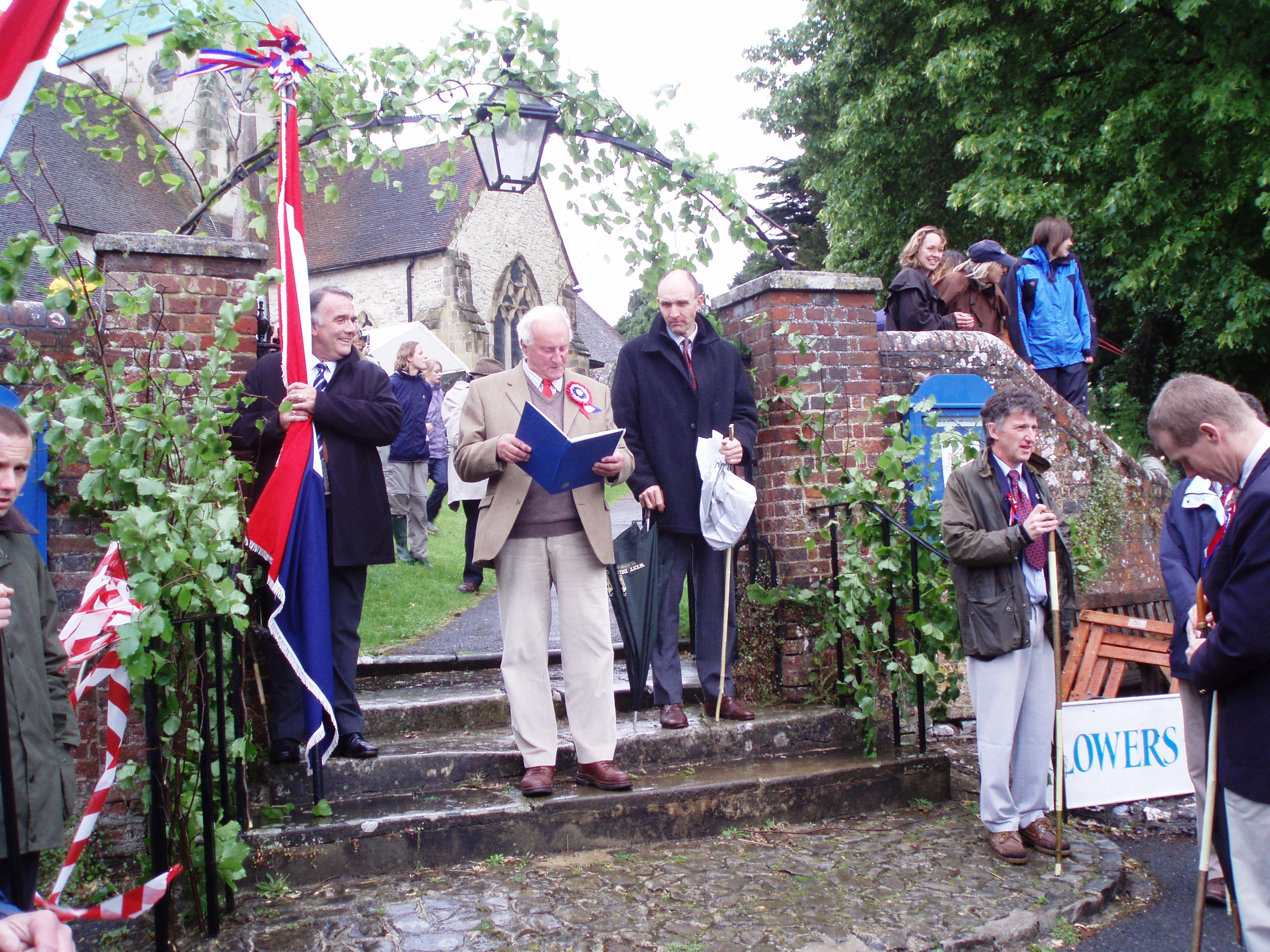
The Harting Old Club's secretary calling the club roll in 2007

A friendly society (sometimes called a benefit society, mutual aid society, benevolent society, fraternal organization or ROSCA) is a mutual association for the purposes of insurance, pensions, savings or cooperative banking. It is a mutual organization or benefit society composed of a body of people who join together for a common financial or social purpose.

Before modern insurance and the welfare state, friendly societies provided financial and social services to individuals, often according to their religious, political, or trade affiliations. These societies are still widespread in many parts of the developing world, where they are referred to by names including ROSCAs (rotating savings and credit associations), ASCAs (accumulating savings and credit associations), burial societies, and chit funds.

== Origin and character ==
Before the development of large-scale government and employer health insurance and other financial services, friendly societies played an important part in many people's lives. In some countries, some of them developed into large mutually-run financial institutions, typically insurance companies, and lost any social and ceremonial aspect they may have had; in others they continue to have a role based on solidarity and democracy without an objective to make profit. The current position of the mutual benefit society in Europe is well described in a report from 2012, commissioned by the European Commission.

Healthcare mutuals worldwide are coming together in Association Internationale de la Mutualité, a Brussels-based association of healthcare mutuals.

In some cases, especially in America, members typically paid a regular membership fee and went to lodge meetings to take part in ceremonies. If members became sick, they would receive an allowance to help them meet their financial obligations. The society might have a doctor whom the member could consult for free. Members of the lodge would visit to provide emotional and other support, and possibly to verify that the sick member was not malingering. When a member died, the funeral would be paid for and the members of the lodge might attend in ceremonial dress. Sometimes, there was some money left over to support the next of kin.

Friendly societies might organize social functions such as dances, and some had sports teams for members. They occasionally became involved in political issues that are of interest to their members. Others are purely financial, with little or no social side, from their foundation.

Credit unions and other types of organization are modern equivalents.

Friendly society brasses were the emblems of village friendly societies or clubs common in the west of England between the late 18th and early 20th centuries. The use of brasses as emblems was particularly prevalent in Somerset and the surrounding counties. The Museum of English Rural Life has a collection of over 900 Friendly Society Brasses, otherwise known as 'poleheads', from both male and female friendly societies. The design of the brasses was sometimes conventional or sometimes represented an interest of the club such as the inn in which the meetings were held.

== Female friendly societies ==
In the United Kingdom, friendly societies were first established and run by men. Female friendly societies emerged in England and Wales during the 19th century, and by 1874, over 27,000 women were members of 460 female friendly societies. Examples include the York Female Friendly Society, founded in 1788 by Faith Gray and Catherine Cappe. Grey and Cappe ran schools for girls and this society was intended to assist them. Another early Female Society was the Wisbech Female Friendly Society instituted in February 1796. Groups including the Nether Stowey Women’s Walk, Neston Female Society and the Drayton & Muchelney Women’s Friendly Society continue to meet as social groups into the 21st century.

== Registration and regulation ==
Some countries allow friendly societies to operate under their own regulations, while in other places friendly societies have no specific legal status which means that they have to comply with the same rules and regulations as for-profit insurance companies.

=== Australia ===
In Australia, friendly societies are regulated under the Life Insurance Act 1995 (Commonwealth) and registered with APRA.

Friendly societies were first established in Australia by community groups in the 1830s and have evolved into member-focused providers of financial services, healthcare, retirement living, aged and home care services, transport, pharmacies and other fraternal services to over 800,000 members. They typically provide savings, investment and insurance products.

=== Ireland ===
In Ireland, friendly societies are registered with the Registrar of Friendly Societies under the Friendly Societies Acts 1896–2014. The Registrar for Companies is also the Registrar for Friendly Societies, Industrial and Provident Societies and Trade Unions.

In 2014, the Friendly Societies and Industrial and Provident Societies (Miscellaneous Provisions) Act, 2014, provided for the cessation of new friendly societies; as a result no new societies may be registered. It was felt that the form of organisation had outlived its usefulness, largely for reasons mentioned above. When the minister's staff examined the register, it was found that only three new societies had registered in the previous nine years, as the use of the traditional friendly society types of business had become regulated elsewhere and a 'rump', which on examination are largely public-service types, remain (mainly army, customs, gardaí, and prison officers). Many of the others could expect to cease to trade if additional, or a normal regulatory environment was required (similar to companies, health and other business (loan organisations). The 2014 Act also provided that existing societies may not establish a 'loan fund' from the commencement of the Act (July 28, 2014).

=== United Kingdom ===
Friendly Societies Act 1992 (Note: Section 126(1).)
- Act of Parliament
- Parliament of the United Kingdom
- Long title: An Act to make further provision for friendly societies; to provide for the cessation of registration under the Friendly Societies Act 1974; to make provision about disputes involving friendly societies or other bodies registered under the Friendly Societies Act 1974 and about the functions of the Chief Registrar of friendly societies; and for connected purposes.
- Citation: 1992 c. 40
- Territorial extent: England and Wales; Scotland; Northern Ireland (Note: Section 124.); Channel Islands; Isle of Man

Dates
- Royal assent: 16 March 1992
- Commencement: various (Note: Section 126(2).)
Other legislation
Amends	Friendly Societies Act 1896; Industrial Assurance Act 1923; Friendly Societies Act 1974
Amended by	Pension Schemes (Northern Ireland) Act 1993; Corporate Insolvency and Governance Act 2020

Status: Amended

Text of statute as originally enacted

Revised text of statute as amended

Text of the Friendly Societies Act 1992 as in force today (including any amendments) within the United Kingdom, from legislation.gov.uk.

The first mutual savings bank, founded in Scotland in 1810, was called the "Savings and Friendly Society".

In 1868, the Rev. John Young Stratton proposed a system of insurance for wage-paid workers administered through the Post Office. Historians Philip Corrigan and Derek Sayer place the proposal within contemporary discussion of a ‘State Friendly Society’.

At their origin, friendly societies the United Kingdom were subject to prudential regulation to safeguard the financial interests of their members and secure the benefits promised to them, but the legislation (including the Friendly Societies Act 1875 (38 & 39 Vict. c. 60)) was separate from that applicable to insurance companies.

Today, friendly societies are registered under either the Friendly Societies Act 1974 (c. 46) or the Friendly Societies Act 1992 (c. 40). There are the following types of society registered under the Friendly Societies Act 1974:

- friendly societies
- working men's clubs
- benevolent societies
- cattle insurance societies
- specially authorised societies

The activities of these societies varies, but includes:

- running a social club
- providing discretionary benefits to members – for instance during sickness or unemployment
- running sports clubs
- managing allotments
- insuring cattle

Some friendly societies are still governed by the 1974 act, although no new societies can be registered under that act. Friendly societies registered under the Friendly Societies Act 1992 are incorporated entities and are registered for effecting and carrying out contracts of insurance.

Similar organisations were called industrial and provident societies. They are trading businesses or voluntary organisations. Recent legal developments in Great Britain include the Co-operative and Community Benefit Societies Act 2014, which has renamed these societies as co-operative or community benefit societies. Examples include co-operatives for consumers, workers, agriculture and housing, working men's clubs, Women's Institute markets, allotment societies, mutual investment companies, housing associations and some social enterprises. Many sports clubs are registered under these provisions.

Friendly societies, alongside other mutual societies, are registered with the Financial Conduct Authority. Until December 2001, the regulator was the Registrar of Friendly Societies, and from then until April 2013 the Financial Services Authority.

== See also ==
- Benefit society
- Fraternal order
- 501(c)(4), United States tax law
- List of friendly and benefit societies
