= Association Internationale de la Mutualité =

The International Association of Mutual Benefit Societies (Association Internationale de la Mutualité; AIM) represents health mutual benefit societies (mutuals) and health insurance funds in Europe and worldwide. It was founded in 1950. It was based in Geneva from 1950 to 1998, and is since then based in Brussels.

Through its 61 members from 27 countries, health coverage is provided to over 200 million people in the world and to 160 million in Europe. Its members manage compulsory and/or voluntary health insurance and some deliver healthcare and social services through their own facilities. As an international association, AIM is present in Europe, Latin America, Africa and the Middle East.

AIM	Association Internationale de la Mutualité – International Association of Mutual Benefit societies
Legal Form	Non-profit association under Belgian law
Mission	Representing health insurance funds and health mutuals in Europe and in the world
Foundation	1950 in Paris
Headquarters	Brussels
Website	http://www.aim-mutual.org%20http://www.aim-mutual.org/healthcare-and-social-benefit-for-all/

== History ==
AIM was founded in January 1950 at the General Assembly in Paris under the French legal form of Association. By that time, the Association had its headquarters in Geneva. Its official statutory name "Association Internationale de la Mutualité" therefore dates back to 1950. Its headquarters were transferred from Geneva to Brussels in 1998. In 2008 AIM changed legal status: it went from an Association under French law to an Association with non-profit orientation under Belgian Law (ASBL). The objective of the association in 1950 was–and still is–to defend mutuals’ interests. Among its members are (umbrella organisations of) healthcare mutual, but also other not-for-profit providers of healthcare coverage and national health funds.

AIM's presidents

- 2026-now: Yannick Lucas ((FR,FNMF)
- 2020-2026: Loek Caubo ZN)
- 2014-2020: Christian Zahn (DE, Vdek)
- 2011–2014: Jean-Philippe Huchet (FR, FNMF)
- 2007–2011: Willi Budde (DE, BKK)
- 2005–2007: Maurice Duranton (FR, FNMF)
- 2002–2005: Ron Hendriks (NL, ZN)
- 2000–2002: Ueli Müller (CH, KSK/CAMS – Concordat des Assureurs-maladie Suisses)
- 1999–2000: Michel Schmitz (LU, CSM, ad interim President)
- 1993–1999: Geert Jan Hamilton (NL, ZN)
- 1978–1993: Robert Van den Heuvel (BE, ANMC)
- 1965–1978: Louis Van Helshoecht (BE, ANMC)
- 1950–1965: Otto Schmid (CH, KSK)

== Missions as International Association ==
AIM works with European and international institutions to promote universal access to healthcare and health protection based on solidarity and democracy according to the principles of its members. It is also a platform for exchange of best practises within its members. AIM defends the specificity of the mutual model of social and solidarity economy and encourages social innovation. It is a member of Social Economy Europe.

AIM members share the mutual values of solidarity and democracy and the principle of not-for-profit orientation

- Solidarity: AIM members protect their own members without any discrimination on grounds of age or state of health.
- Democracy: our members involve their own members in deciding upon services, setting subscriptions and in the governance of their mutuals.
- Not-for-profit orientation: according to their statutes, AIM's members reinvest any surplus in the benefit of their members.

== Activities ==
AIM works on several subjects: health, insurance, social economy, disease prevention, education, healthy ageing, pension and fraud in healthcare. To cover all the topics, 12 working groups gather national experts to discuss the issues relevant for its members.

The Working Groups are the following:

- European Affairs
- Health Systems Reform
- Disease Management/ eHealth
- Long Term Care / Healthy Ageing
- Pharmaceuticals and Medical Devices
- Health Technology Assessment
- Mutual Values
- Pensions
- Environment and Health
- Fraud
- Education and E-learning Working Group
- Disease Prevention
