= Grade I listed buildings in the City of York =

There are over 9,000 Grade I listed buildings in England. This page is a list of these buildings in the City of York in North Yorkshire.

== List of buildings ==
Name	Location	Type	Completed (Note: The date given is the date used by Historic England as significant for the initial building or that of an important part in the structure's description.)	Date designated	Grid ref. (Note: Sometimes known as OSGB36, the grid reference is based on the British national grid reference system used by the Ordnance Survey.) Geo-coordinates	Entry number (Note: The "List Entry Number" is a unique number assigned to each listed building and scheduled monument by Historic England.)	Image
Roman Wall approx. 20 metres south-east of Monk Bar	York	Roman wall	c. 200	14 June 1954	SE6062252178; 53°57′44″N 1°04′39″W	1259572	Roman Wall approx. 20 metres south-east of Monk Bar More images
Wall approx. 2 metres north of No. 9 St Leonard's Place	York	Roman wall	c. 300	24 June 1983	SE6007952174; 53°57′44″N 1°05′09″W	1256762	Wall approx. 2 metres north of No. 9 St Leonard's Place More images
Anglian Tower	York	Tower	7th century on Roman footings (probably)	14 June 1954	SE6004552135; 53°57′43″N 1°05′11″W	1257157	Anglian Tower More images
Church of St Mary Bishophill Junior	York	Parish church	10th century	14 June 1954	SE5999651474; 53°57′21″N 1°05′14″W	1259548	Church of St Mary Bishophill Junior More images
Church of St Martin Cum Gregory	York	Church	11th century (nave)	14 June 1954	SE6000551609; 53°57′26″N 1°05′13″W	1257277	Church of St Martin Cum Gregory More images
St Mary's Abbey remains: Church	York	Abbey	1089	14 June 1954	SE5993652174; 53°57′44″N 1°05′17″W	1257128	St Mary's Abbey remains: Church More images
Church of St Cuthbert	York	Parish church	Late 11th century	14 June 1954	SE6077052033; 53°57′39″N 1°04′31″W	1256888	Church of St Cuthbert More images
Church of Holy Trinity, Micklegate and wall attached to south east	York	Church	Early 12th century	14 June 1954	SE5988951547; 53°57′24″N 1°05′20″W	1257274	Church of Holy Trinity, Micklegate and wall attached to south east More images
Holy Trinity Goodramgate	York	Parish church	Early 12th century	14 June 1954	SE6043552052; 53°57′40″N 1°04′49″W	1257686	Holy Trinity Goodramgate More images
Church of St Nicholas	Askham Bryan	Church	12th century	12 July 1985	SE5538048472; 53°55′46″N 1°09′29″W	1132520	Church of St Nicholas More images
Grays Court and garden gates and piers attached to south-east corner	York	House	12th century	14 June 1954	SE6041052301; 53°57′48″N 1°04′51″W	1257248	Grays Court and garden gates and piers attached to south-east corner More images
Arcade of former Archbishop's Palace and attached railings and gates	York	Archbishop's palace	Late 12th century	14 June 1954	SE6026052289; 53°57′47″N 1°04′59″W	1257919	Arcade of former Archbishop's Palace and attached railings and gates More images
Church of St Margaret Walmgate	York	Church	Late 12th century and later	14 June 1954	SE6095251566; 53°57′24″N 1°04′21″W	1256319	Church of St Margaret Walmgate More images
Church of St Michael Spurriergate	York	Church hall	Late 12th century (arcades)	14 June 1954	SE6029451694; 53°57′28″N 1°04′57″W	1256593	Church of St Michael Spurriergate More images
St Mary's Lodge and attached railings, gates and gate piers, at St Mary's Abbey	York	Abbey	Late 12th century	14 June 1954	SE5983752159; 53°57′43″N 1°05′22″W	1257136	St Mary's Lodge and attached railings, gates and gate piers, at St Mary's Abbey More images
The Norman House	Stonegate, York	Hall house	Late 12th century	14 June 1954	SE6025452078; 53°57′41″N 1°04′59″W	1256494	The Norman House More images
West tower of the Old Church of St Lawrence	York	Tower	Late 12th century	14 June 1954	SE6122551303; 53°57′15″N 1°04′07″W	1257511	West tower of the Old Church of St Lawrence More images
Yorkshire Museum, Tempest Anderson Hall and St Marys Abbey Remains	York	Museum	Late 12th century	14 June 1954	SE5996552135; 53°57′43″N 1°05′15″W	1257100	Yorkshire Museum, Tempest Anderson Hall and St Marys Abbey Remains More images
Minster Library	York	Archbishop's palace	c. 1230	14 June 1954	SE6029952309; 53°57′48″N 1°04′57″W	1257880	Minster Library More images
Church of St Giles	Skelton	Church	c. 1240	12 December 1986	SE5684956557; 54°00′07″N 1°08′03″W	1315980	Church of St Giles More images
St Leonard's Hospital remains	York	Chapel	c. 1240	14 June 1954	SE6005252049; 53°57′40″N 1°05′10″W	1257087	St Leonard's Hospital remains More images
Curtain Wall, Castle Precinct	York	Tower	c. 1250	14 June 1954	SE6057751374; 53°57′18″N 1°04′42″W	1259329	Curtain Wall, Castle Precinct More images
City Wall from Bootham Bar to Layerthorpe	York	Tower	1250–70	14 June 1954	SE6028452411; 53°57′51″N 1°04′57″W	1259293	City Wall from Bootham Bar to Layerthorpe More images
City Wall from Lendall Hill House to the Lodge, Museum Gardens	York	Town wall	1250–70	14 June 1954	SE6001452008; 53°57′38″N 1°05′13″W	1259290	City Wall from Lendall Hill House to the Lodge, Museum Gardens More images
City Wall from Multangular Tower to rear of No. 8 St Leonard's Place	York	Town wall	1250–70	14 June 1954	SE6002952117; 53°57′42″N 1°05′12″W	1259292	City Wall from Multangular Tower to rear of No. 8 St Leonard's Place More images
Bishopthorpe Palace and Chapel	Bishopthorpe	Archbishop's palace	13th century	4 July 1952	SE5972047824; 53°55′23″N 1°05′32″W	1132487	Bishopthorpe Palace and Chapel More images
Church of St Olave	York	Parish church	13th century	14 June 1954	SE5986452186; 53°57′44″N 1°05′21″W	1257387	Church of St Olave More images
Cliffords Tower, Castle Precinct	York	Keep	1245–72	14 June 1954	SE6046351467; 53°57′21″N 1°04′48″W	1259325	Cliffords Tower, Castle Precinct More images
Wall approx. 5 metres north-east of the King's Manor	York	Wall	c. 1266	24 June 1983	SE6006452195; 53°57′44″N 1°05′10″W	1257859	Wall approx. 5 metres north-east of the King's Manor More images
City Walls attached to Tower Place	York	Town wall	Late 13th century	24 June 1983	SE6040351412; 53°57′19″N 1°04′52″W	1259260	City Walls attached to Tower Place More images
Multangular Tower, and wall attached to south-east, Museum Gardens	York	Tower	Late 13th century	14 June 1954	SE6001252072; 53°57′41″N 1°05′13″W	1257120	Multangular Tower, and wall attached to south-east, Museum Gardens More images
Lendal Tower	York	Tower	c. 1300	14 June 1954	SE5999151959; 53°57′37″N 1°05′14″W	1257086	Lendal Tower More images
Church of the Holy Trinity	Acaster Malbis	Church	Early 14th century	3 February 1967	SE5937445835; 53°54′19″N 1°05′52″W	1148450	Church of the Holy Trinity More images
City Wall from Baile Hill to Barker Tower	York	Tower	Early 14th century	14 June 1954	SE5968351630; 53°57′26″N 1°05′31″W	1259262	City Wall from Baile Hill to Barker Tower More images
Lady Row	York	Jettied house	1317	14 June 1954	SE6045752039; 53°57′39″N 1°04′48″W	1257710	Lady Row More images
St Mary's Abbey remains: Precinct Walls, St Mary's Tower	York	Tower	1324	14 June 1954	SE5979952130; 53°57′43″N 1°05′24″W	1257131	St Mary's Abbey remains: Precinct Walls, St Mary's Tower More images
City Wall from the Red Tower to Fishergate (Postern Tower, Fishergate Bar, Fishergate Postern Tower, the Red Tower, Walmgate Bar)	York	Town wall	Mid-14th century and later	14 June 1954	SE6069451256; 53°57′14″N 1°04′36″W	1259296	City Wall from the Red Tower to Fishergate (Postern Tower, Fishergate Bar, Fishergate Postern Tower, the Red Tower, Walmgate Bar) More images
Church of All Saints, Pavement	York	Parish church	14th century	14 June 1954	SE6041951721; 53°57′29″N 1°04′51″W	1256921	Church of All Saints, Pavement More images
Church of St Denys	York	Parish church	14th century	14 June 1954	SE6071351574; 53°57′24″N 1°04′34″W	1256313	Church of St Denys More images
Church of St Helen	Wheldrake	Church	14th century	7 November 1966	SE6827844985; 53°53′48″N 0°57′45″W	1148480	Church of St Helen More images
Merchant Adventurers' Hall	York	Exchange	1357–61	14 June 1954	SE6054751705; 53°57′28″N 1°04′44″W	1257828	Merchant Adventurers' Hall More images
Merchant Taylors Hall	York	Guildhall	c. 1400	14 June 1954	SE6064452153; 53°57′43″N 1°04′38″W	1259571	Merchant Taylors Hall More images
Cathedral Church of St Peter, York Minster	York	Cathedral	1410–70	14 June 1954	SE6032352180; 53°57′44″N 1°04′55″W	1257222	Cathedral Church of St Peter, York Minster More images
York Guildhall	York	Guidhall	1449–59	14 June 1954	SE6009251894; 53°57′35″N 1°05′08″W	1257929	York Guildhall More images
Church of All Saints, North Street with Anchorage attached	York	Anchorite cell	15th century	14 June 1954	SE6005351758; 53°57′30″N 1°05′11″W	1257067	Church of All Saints, North Street with Anchorage attached More images
St Mary's church, Castlegate (The York Story)	York	Exhibition hall	15th century	14 June 1954	SE6044051624; 53°57′26″N 1°04′49″W	1259342	St Mary's church, Castlegate (The York Story) More images
St William's College	York	Chantry college	c. 1465 and later	14 June 1954	SE6044752195; 53°57′44″N 1°04′49″W	1258028	St William's College More images
King's Manor	York	Apartment	1483–1502	14 June 1954	SE6000452127; 53°57′42″N 1°05′13″W	1257855	King's Manor More images
Nos. 41, 43 and 45 Goodramgate	York	Italian restaurant	c. 1500	14 June 1954	SE6048252117; 53°57′42″N 1°04′47″W	1257738	Nos. 41, 43 and 45 Goodramgate More images
The Wealden Hall	Goodramgate, York	Wealden house	c. 1500	14 June 1954	SE6047952092; 53°57′41″N 1°04′47″W	1257745	The Wealden Hall More images
Jacobs Well	York	House	Early 16th century	14 June 1954	SE5990851574; 53°57′24″N 1°05′19″W	1256384	Jacobs Well More images
Church of St Michael le Belfrey	York	Parish church	1525–37	14 June 1954	SE6027952128; 53°57′42″N 1°04′58″W	1257228	Church of St Michael le Belfrey More images
Treasurer's House and attached garden walls, gate and gate piers	York	House	16th century	14 June 1954	SE6040752268; 53°57′47″N 1°04′51″W	1257251	Treasurer's House and attached garden walls, gate and gate piers More images
Nos. 12 and 14, The Herbert House	York	House	Mid-17th century	14 June 1954	SE6048651782; 53°57′31″N 1°04′47″W	1256914	Nos. 12 and 14, The Herbert House More images
St Anthony's Hall	York	Prison	1655	14 June 1954	SE6073151989; 53°57′38″N 1°04′33″W	1256892	St Anthony's Hall More images
Bell Hall	Naburn	House	1680	25 October 1951	SE5996643747; 53°53′11″N 1°05′21″W	1296999	Bell Hall More images
York Castle Museum, the Debtors Prison, Castle Precinct	York	Prison	1701–05	14 June 1954	SE6053651369; 53°57′18″N 1°04′44″W	1259360	York Castle Museum, the Debtors Prison, Castle Precinct More images
Cumberland House	York	Town house	c. 1710	14 June 1954	SE6028551584; 53°57′25″N 1°04′58″W	1257526	Cumberland House More images
Judges Lodging	York	Town house	c. 1715	14 June 1954	SE6011552002; 53°57′38″N 1°05′07″W	1257487	Judges Lodging More images
Mansion House, railings and gas lamps attached to front	York	House	1725–33	14 June 1954	SE6014551921; 53°57′36″N 1°05′05″W	1257969	Mansion House, railings and gas lamps attached to front More images
The Assembly Rooms	York	Assembly rooms	1730	14 June 1954	SE6012352039; 53°57′39″N 1°05′07″W	1259521	The Assembly Rooms More images
Fairfax House	York	House	c. 1744	14 June 1954	SE6046351578; 53°57′24″N 1°04′48″W	1259337	Fairfax House More images
Micklegate House and attached railings and lamp brackets	York	House	1752	14 June 1954	SE5985451600; 53°57′25″N 1°05′22″W	1257285	Micklegate House and attached railings and lamp brackets More images
Garforth House and railings attached at front, garden wall attached at rear	York	Town house	1757	14 June 1954	SE5995251651; 53°57′27″N 1°05′16″W	1257335	Garforth House and railings attached at front, garden wall attached at rear More images
Castlegate House and attached railings	York	Town house	1762–63	14 June 1954	SE6042651573; 53°57′24″N 1°04′50″W	1259338	Castlegate House and attached railings More images
Crown Court and railings attached to front, Castle Precinct	York	Court house	1773–77	14 June 1954	SE6051751399; 53°57′19″N 1°04′45″W	1259328	Crown Court and railings attached to front, Castle Precinct More images
23 High Petergate and attached garden wall and outbuilding	York	House	c. 1779	14 June 1954	SE6024552121; 53°57′42″N 1°05′00″W	1257607	23 High Petergate and attached garden wall and outbuilding More images
Bootham Park Hospital	York	Psychiatric hospital	c. 1790	24 June 1983	SE6010652772; 53°58′03″N 1°05′07″W	1259396	Bootham Park Hospital More images
York Castle Museum, the Female Prison, Castle Precinct	York	Prison	1820–50	14 June 1954	SE6058451438; 53°57′20″N 1°04′42″W	1259324	York Castle Museum, the Female Prison, Castle Precinct More images
The Bar Convent and railings attached to front	York	Courtyard	c. 1865	14 June 1954	SE5975151353; 53°57′17″N 1°05′27″W	1259503	The Bar Convent and railings attached to front More images
Goddards and attached gateway, terrace and loggia to side and rear	Dringhouses, York	House	1926–27	24 June 1983	SE5891249721; 53°56′25″N 1°06′15″W	1256461	Goddards and attached gateway, terrace and loggia to side and rear More images

== See also ==
- Grade II* listed buildings in the City of York
- Grade I listed buildings in North Yorkshire
- Scheduled monuments in the City of York
