= Lady Row =

Grade I listed building in York, England

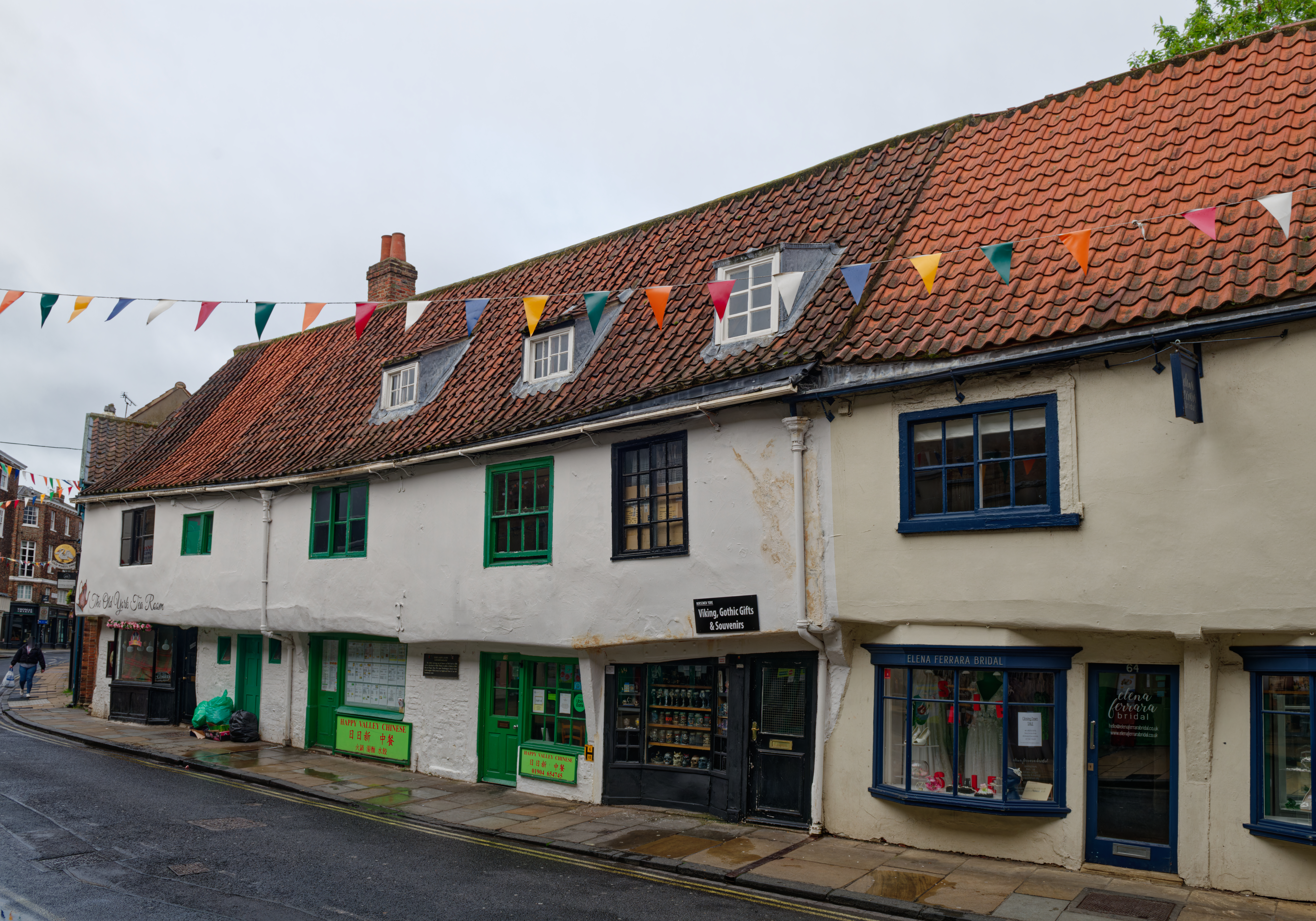
- The building in 2024

- Location within York Central
- Alternative names: Our Lady's Row

General information
- Location: 60–72 Goodramgate, York, England
- Coordinates: 53.9608°N 1.0801°W
- Year built: 1317
- Renovated: Late 18th century (Nos. 60 and 62 partly rebuilt); Early 19th century (No. 60 partly rebuilt and extended); Late 19th and 20th century (altered)

Listed Building – Grade I
- Official name: Lady Row
- Designated: 14 June 1954
- Reference no.: 1257710

Lady Row, also known as Our Lady's Row, is a medieval Grade I listed building on Goodramgate in York, England. Historic England describe the structure as "some of the earliest urban vernacular building surviving in England".

== History ==
The building was commissioned in 1316 as a terrace of tenements, to be let out to provide an income for a chantry priest at Holy Trinity, Goodramgate. The eleven-bay building was quickly constructed, and is usually dated as having been completed in 1317. Initially it was divided into nine or ten tenements, each occupying both floors and one or more of the bays. By the 16th century, many of the tenements had been knocked together, and the building consisted of three cottages and a single tenement. Originally, an additional house was built in the churchyard of Holy Trinity, to house the chantry priest.

The southernmost two bays had been demolished by the mid-18th century, when an archway to access the churchyard was built in their place. Around 1784, the second and third bays from the north end were rebuilt in brick as two three-storey houses. The two southernmost remaining bays housed a pub from 1796 to 1819, named The Hawk's Crest. In 1827, it was proposed to demolish the remainder of the building, to extend the churchyard, but ultimately only the separate chantry priest's house was demolished. Following this reprieve, the northernmost bay was also heightened to three storeys and extended to block a former entrance to the churchyard.

== Architecture ==
The facade of the building has been repeatedly altered, and the ground floor now consists of shop fronts, while the windows on the upper floor are 18th-century and later. The basic wooden frame and jettying of the upper floor survive, and some of the internal walls may also be original. An attic floor was inserted in about the 17th century, and the pantiled roof is of unknown date.

== Gallery ==
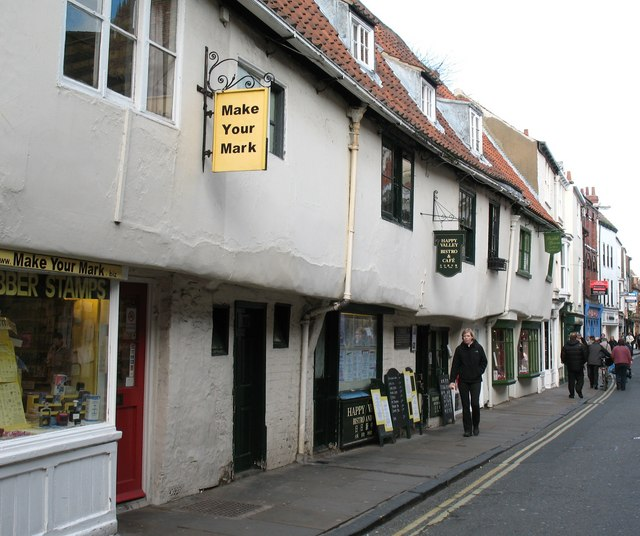
Lady Row in 2008, seen from the south-east

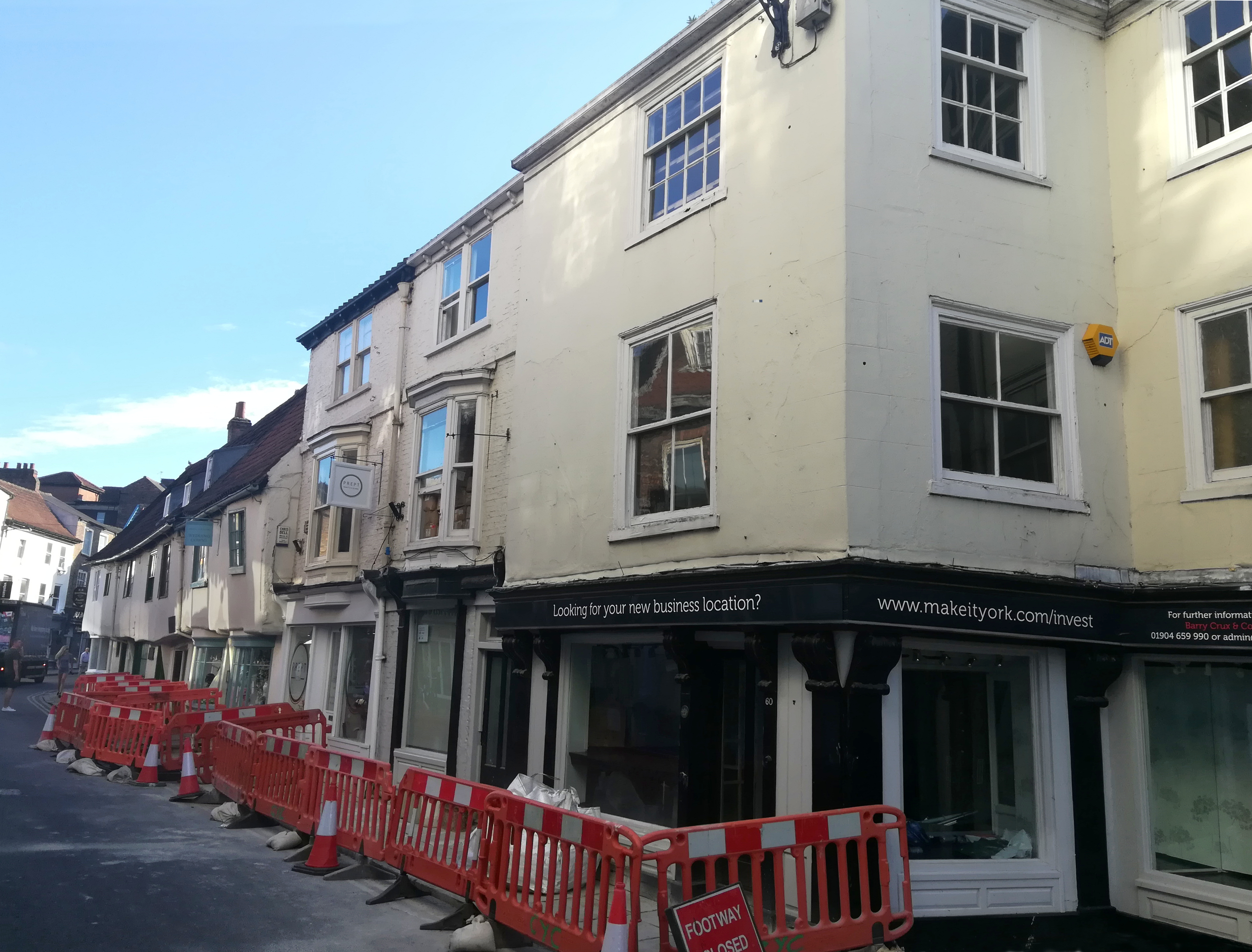
Northern end of Lady Row

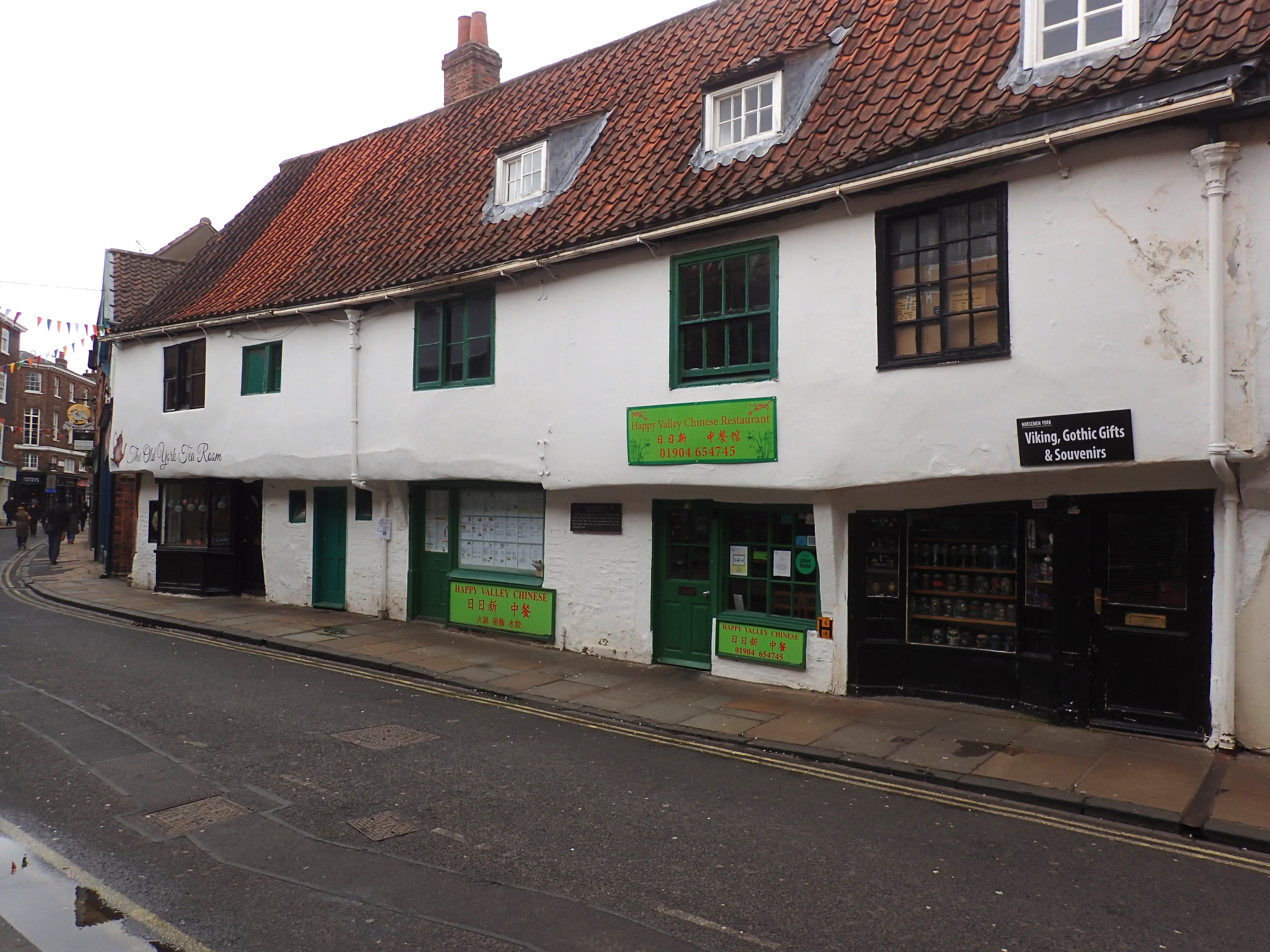
Lady Row in April 2024

== See also ==
- Grade I listed buildings in the City of York
- Listed buildings in York (within the city walls, northern part)
