= 28–32 Coppergate =

Listed buildings in York, England

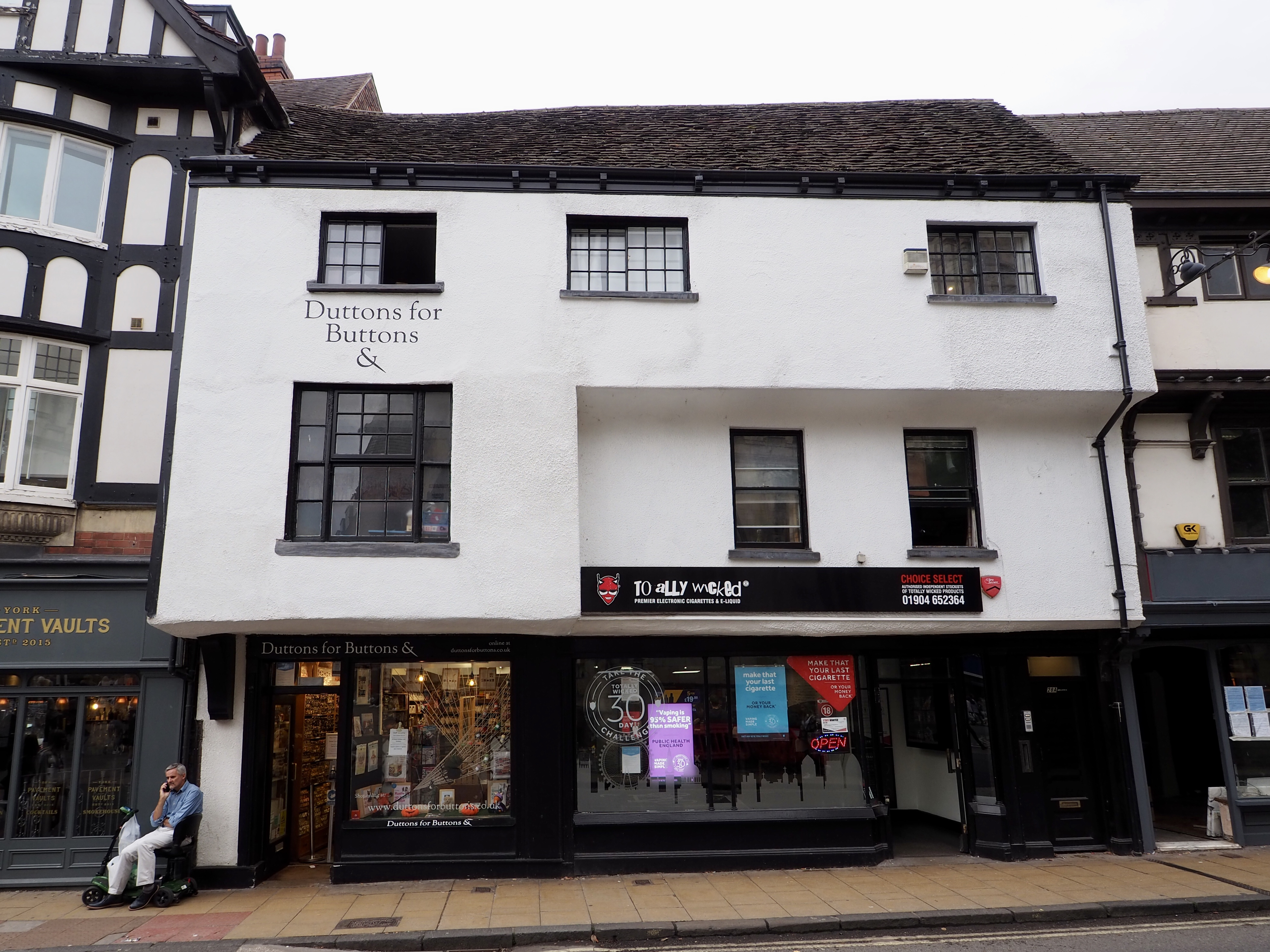
- The terrace in 2021
- Interactive map of the 28–32 Coppergate area

General information
- Location: Coppergate, York, England
- Coordinates: 53°57′29″N 1°04′49″W
- Completed: 15th century
- Renovated: 17th century (floor and fireplaces inserted) c. 1800 (altered); 19th century (shopfronts); 1988 (No. 28 restored); 1994 (No. 30 restored)

Technical details
- Floor count: 3

Design and construction
- Designations

Listed Building – Grade II*
- Official name: 28, 30 and 32, Coppergate
- Designated: 14 June 1954
- Reference no.: 1257901

28–32 Coppergate is a historic building in the city centre of York, England.

The rear part of the timber-framed building originated as a five-bay hall house, built in the 15th century. It may be the building recorded as having been built by William Alne, Member of Parliament for York, in about 1420. However, the City of York Council note that, due to its size and unusual layout, it may have been constructed as an inn.

The ground floor of the house was open, probably for use as a shop, while on the first floor the two south-eastern bays formed a single hall, open to the roof, while the third bay had a third storey. The fourth and fifth bays were later demolished, and their form is not known. In front of the hall house, facing on to Coppergate, is a row of three three-storey tenements. These also date from the 15th century, and have shops on the ground floor and accommodation above. Each floor was jettied. The first floor of No. 32 extends out to the line of its second floor; this may be a later change, but City of York Council argues that it acted as a porch, and would have been in the centre of the facade of the original building.

In the 17th century, a floor was inserted into the hall, to make this part of the building three-storeyed, and fireplaces were also added. The building was further altered in about 1800. Originally, each shop had its own entrance, and there were pointed shop windows, but the current shopfronts date from the 19th century. No. 28 was restored in 1988, and then No. 30 was restored in 1994.

On the first floor are a couple of fragments of 17th-century painted wall plaster. Some decorative plasterwork and fireplaces of this date also survive.

The building was Grade II* listed in 1954, with a note that it was an "apparently rare building type of which few other examples were known nationally", although 41–45 Goodramgate represents a more complete example in the same city. It is currently divided into two shops, one of which is the haberdashery Duttons for Buttons.

== See also ==
- Grade II* listed buildings in the City of York
- Listed buildings in York (within the city walls, southern part)
