= York Debtor's Prison =

Grade I listed building in York, England

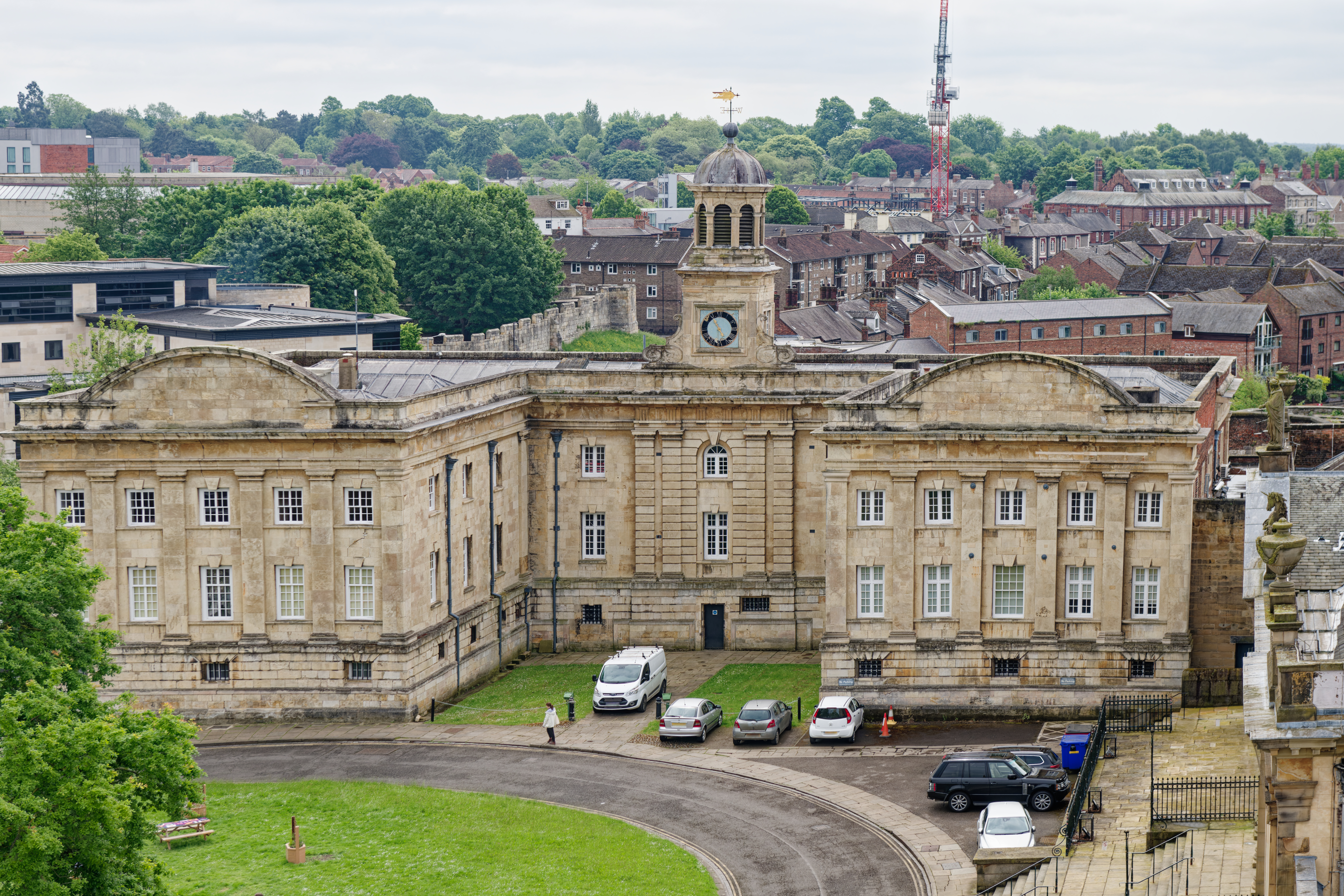
- The building in 2024

- Location within York City Centre

General information
- Status: Part of York Castle Museum
- Type: Debtor's prison (former)
- Location: Eye of York, York, England
- Coordinates: 53.955564°N 1.0812864°W
- Grid position: SE 60384 51443
- Year built: 1701–1705
- Renovated: 1824–1835 (extended) c. 1950 (converted); 1966 (restored)

Design and construction
- Designations

Listed Building – Grade I
- Official name: Castle Museum the Debtors Prison
- Designated: 14 June 1954
- Reference no.: 1259360

York Debtor's Prison is a former debtor's prison and Grade I listed building in the city of York, England. Since 1952 it has been part of the York Castle Museum.

== History ==
The Debtor's Prison was originally built as the County Gaol between 1701 and 1705 due to an act of Parliament, the Insolvent Debtors Relief Act 1702 (1 Ann. c. 19). (Note: 1701: 1 Anne stat 1 c.25: An Act for the Relief of poor Prisoners for Debt) It is located to the south of Clifford's Tower, within the former castle bailey. It is a three-storey building with a central range and clock turret flanked by projecting wings built with Tadcaster limestone and brick walls, and a lead and slate roof. Some of the original building stone came from ruined parts of Clifford's Tower and King's Manor. It was extended between 1824 and 1835.

=== Prisoners ===
The prison's most notable inhabitant was Dick Turpin, who was incarcerated in the 1730s before his trial at the York assizes. His cell forms part of the exhibition in the current museum.

=== Executions ===
The castle area became the regular place of executions in York in the early 1800s, replacing the Tyburn on the Knavesmire. The new gallows were completed on 8 March 1801 at a cost of £10 and 15 shillings and were first used for the execution of a cattle thief, Samuel Lundy, on 11 April 1801. Condemned criminals were hanged in this space, known as 'the Drop', between the Assize Courts and the bailey wall (immediately adjacent to the Debtor's Prison) until 1868. From 1868 to 1896 executions took place inside the prison walls at the north end of the Female Prison. A total of 153 men and seven women were hanged in the castle precincts between April 1801 and December 1896.

=== Museum ===
The Debtor's Prison was added to the York Castle Museum in 1952. The building was partially restored in 1966. The Debtor's Prison was joined to the Female Prison, through the addition of a link building connecting the two, in 1969. An Edwardian Street, called Half Moon Court, was constructed in the eastern end of the building in 1963. By 1981 the cells in the basement of the Debtor's Prison were used to recreate Victorian and Edwardian workshops, including a jet workshop, a comb maker, a wheelwright, and a pipe-maker. It also included a 'condemned cell' where, by tradition, Turpin was held before his execution in 1739.

== See also ==
- Grade I listed buildings in the City of York
- Listed buildings in York (within the city walls, southern part)
