= Scheduled monuments in the City of York =

There are 23 scheduled monuments in the City of York, in England.

In the United Kingdom, the scheduling of monuments was first initiated to ensure the preservation of "nationally important" archaeological sites and historic buildings. Protection is given to scheduled monuments under the Ancient Monuments and Archaeological Areas Act 1979. There are nearly 20,000 entries on the schedule, which is maintained by Historic England as part of the National Heritage List for England; more than one site can be included in a single entry. While a scheduled monument can also be recognised as a listed building, Historic England's aim is to set the most appropriate form of protection in place for the building or site.

== Scheduled monuments ==
Name	Location	Type	Completed (Note: The date given is the date used by Historic England as significant for the initial building or that of an important part in the structure's description.)	Grid ref. (Note: Sometimes known as OSGB36, the grid reference is based on the British national grid reference system used by the Ordnance Survey.) Geo-coordinates	Entry number (Note: The "List Entry Number" is a unique number assigned to each listed building and scheduled monument by Historic England.)	Image
Bootham Stray Roman camp	Clifton Without	Camp	70s	SE 59874 54897	1019342	Upload Photo
Clifton Moor Roman camp	Clifton Without	Camp	70s	SE 59643 54835	1019859	Upload Photo
Derventio	Kexby	Town	70s	SE7012654447	1416328	Upload Photo
Huntington South Moor Roman camp	Huntington	Camp	70s	SE 62081 54694	1020976	Upload Photo
Siward's Howe	Heslington	Tumulus	70s	SE 62186 50871	1015690	Upload Photo
Minster Precinct	City centre	Various	71	SE 60335 52293	1017777	Minster Precinct
South Angle Tower of Roman fortress	City centre	Fortification	108	SE 60318 51817	1004174	Upload Photo
Nether Poppleton moated site	Nether Poppleton	Moated site	7th century	SE 56434 55146	1014621	Upload Photo
Lamel Hill	Heslington	Tumulus	8th century	SE 61445 50946	1004886	Lamel Hill
St Mary's Abbey	City centre	Church	1086	SE 59917 52086	1004919	St Mary's Abbey
St Peter's Hospital	City centre	Hospital	1140s	SE 60113 52121	1005475	Upload Photo
St George's Chapel	City centre	Church	12th century	SE 60516 51300	1020407	Upload Photo
St Lawrence's Church	Lawrence Street	Church	12th century	SE 61232 51307	1020683	St Lawrence's Church
The Norman House	City centre	House	12th century	SE 60258 52085	1020406	The Norman House
Jewbury Medieval Jewish cemetery	City centre	Cemetery	13th century	SE6076452163	1491399	Jewbury Medieval Jewish cemetery
York Castle	City centre	Castle	1262	SE 60514 51419	1011799	York Castle
St Mary's Abbey precinct walls	City centre	Walls	1324	SE 59994 52330	1004920	St Mary's Abbey precinct walls
York City Walls	City centre	Fortification	14th century	SE 59969 51328	1004910	York City Walls
Merchant Adventurers' Hall	City centre	Guildhall	1357	SE 60544 51708	1004888	Merchant Adventurers' Hall
Fulford Cross	Fulford	Cross	1484	SE6086950130	1015539	Fulford Cross
Kexby Old Bridge	Kexby	Bridge	1650	SE 70531 51079	1004901	Kexby Old Bridge
World War II bombing decoy	Heslington	Decoy	1942	SE 63648 47497	1020404	World War II bombing decoy
York Cold War Bunker	Holgate	Bunker	1961	SE 58060 51547	1019439	York Cold War Bunker

== See also ==
- Grade I listed buildings in the City of York
- List of scheduled monuments in the United Kingdom
