= St Denys's Church, York =

Grade I listed church in York, England

St Denys Church, York
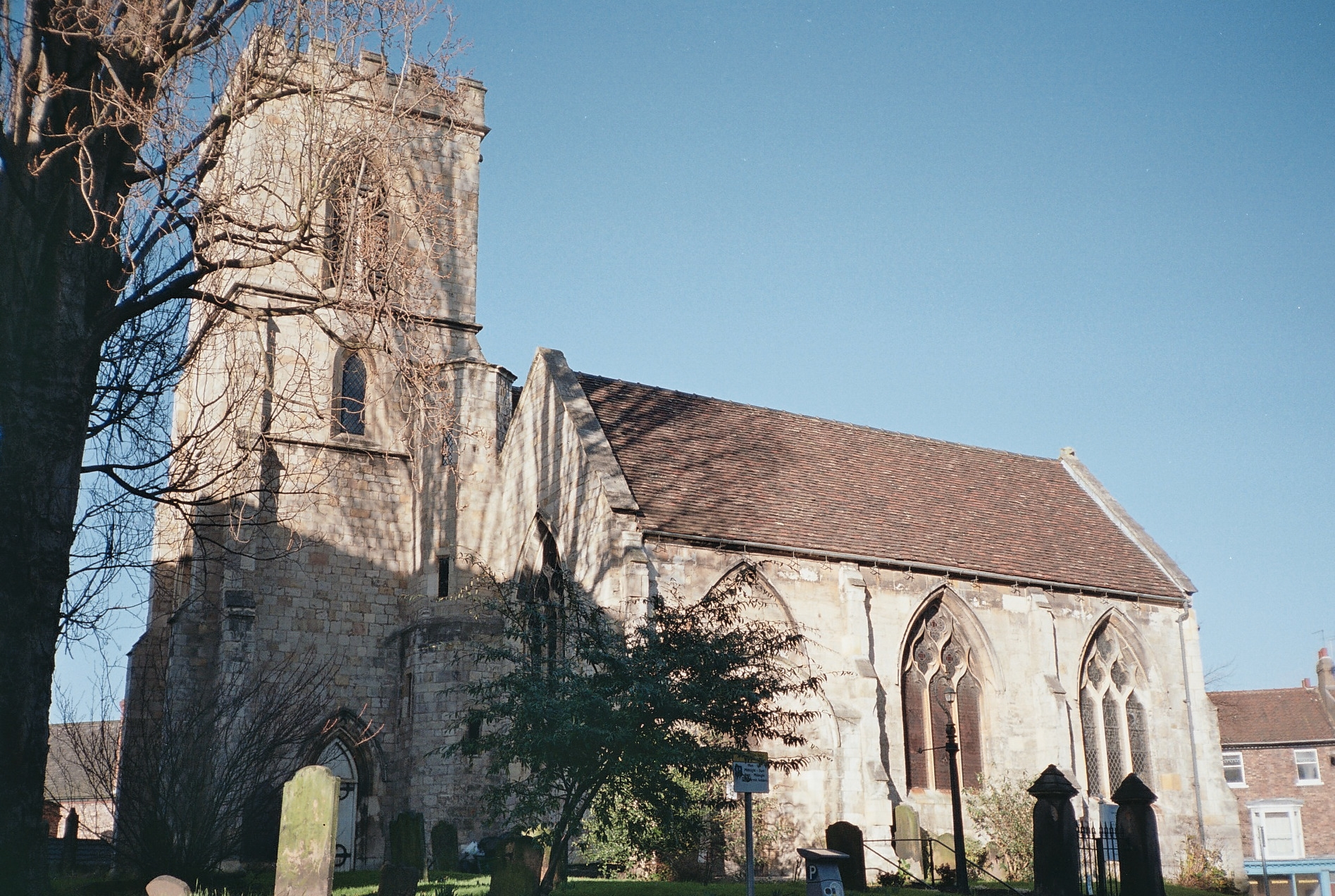
- St Denys Church, York
- St Denys Church, York
- 53.956684°N 1.076212°W
- OS grid reference: SE 60713 51574
- Location: Walmgate, York
- Country: England
- Denomination: Church of England

History
- Dedication: St Denys

Architecture
- Heritage designation: Grade I listed

Administration
- Province: Province of York
- Diocese: Diocese of York
- Archdeaconry: York
- Deanery: York
- Parish: York St Denys

St Denys' Church is a Grade I listed parish church in the Church of England on Walmgate in the city of York.

== History ==
It was built on the site of a Saxon church and possibly of a Roman temple (the earliest records date from about 1154). Inside some of the earliest stained glass in York can be found: the sculpted Norman doorway and 15th-century heraldic roof are also noteworthy features. The figure of St Denys can be seen in the 15th-century east window – fewer than 40 English churches are dedicated to this French saint.

The church was originally a lot larger than it is now, as part of the church subsided after the king's fishpool was drained; another part gave way shortly after as a sewer was being built nearby and the current main entrance is situated where a window used to be. Originally it also had a spire, but between the 17th and 18th century it was hit by a cannon shot and struck by lightning. The spire was only removed 20 years later after being partially blown down.

The church was rebuilt in 1798 and then in 1846–47 there were further alterations including the rebuilding of the west end and tower, and north and south arcades under the supervision of the architect Thomas Pickersgill.

== Burials ==
- Henry Percy, 3rd Earl of Northumberland

== Memorials ==
- Robert Welborn Hotham c. 1806 by Fisher
- James Melrose (d. 1837) by Plows
- Rev John Walker, Rector, (d. 1813)
- Dorothy Wilson (d. 1717)

== Organ ==
The previous pipe organ was built by Thos. S. Hughes of Bradford and dates from 1925. A specification of the organ can be found on the National Pipe Organ Register.

In 2017–18 the organ was replaced by the 1879 Father Willis organ formerly at St Ebbe's Church, Oxford.

== See also ==
- Grade I listed buildings in the City of York
- Listed buildings in York (within the city walls, southern part)
