= 23 High Petergate =

Grade I listed building in York, England

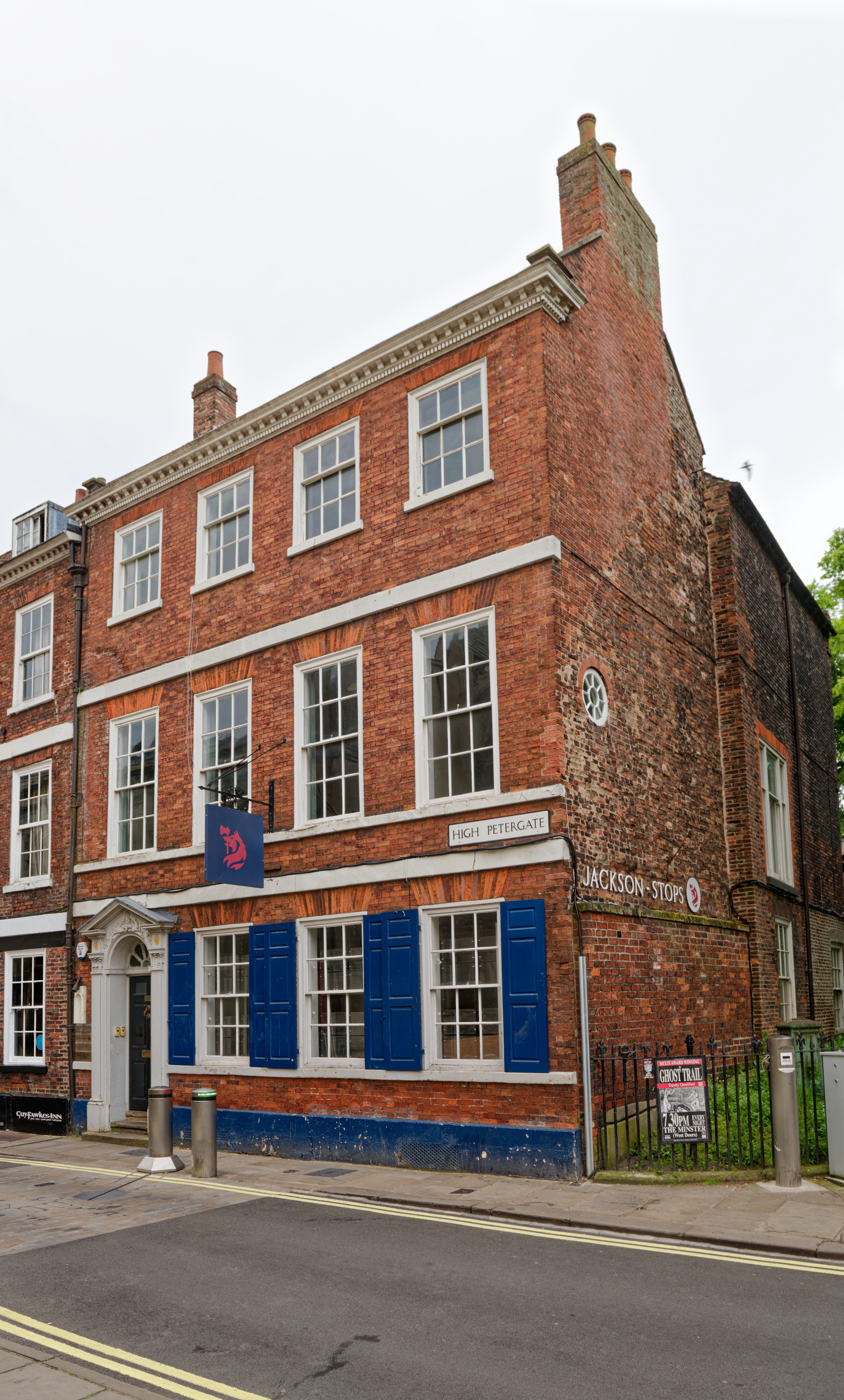
- The house in 2024

- Location within York Central

General information
- Location: High Petergate, York, England
- Coordinates: 53.9617°N 1.0833°W
- Year built: c. 1779
- Renovated: Late 19th century (carriage house); Early 20th century (altered)

Listed Building – Grade I
- Official name: Number 23 and attached garden wall and outbuilding
- Designated: 14 June 1954
- Reference no.: 1257607

23 High Petergate is a Grade I listed building in the city centre of York, England.

The house lies on High Petergate, one of the main streets in York. It was built in about 1779 at the end of a terrace, with a three-storey, four bay front of red brick, and side and back walls of orange brick. Its external appearance is largely original, including the doorway, windows, and ground floor shutters. The top of a drainpipe is inscribed "1780", while a similar one to the rear is marked "1779". To the side of the front door is a torch extinguisher, made of iron. The garden wall is also original.

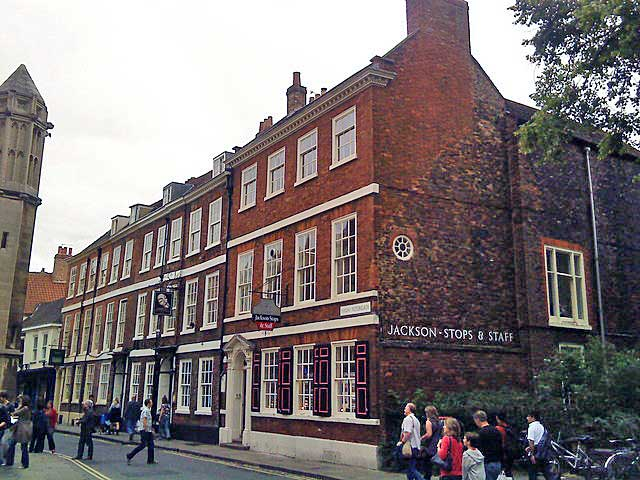
The house, on High Petergate

A carriage house was added in the late 19th century, and there were further alterations to the building in the 20th century. Inside the building, the main feature is an original staircase, rising through all the stories, with a serpentine balustrade, top lit by a glazed dome, surrounded by neoclassical plasterwork. This staircase is described by Nikolaus Pevsner as "exceptional".

The building was grade I listed in 1954.

== See also ==
- Grade I listed buildings in the City of York
- Listed buildings in York (within the city walls, northern part)
