= Garforth House =

Grade I listed building in York, England

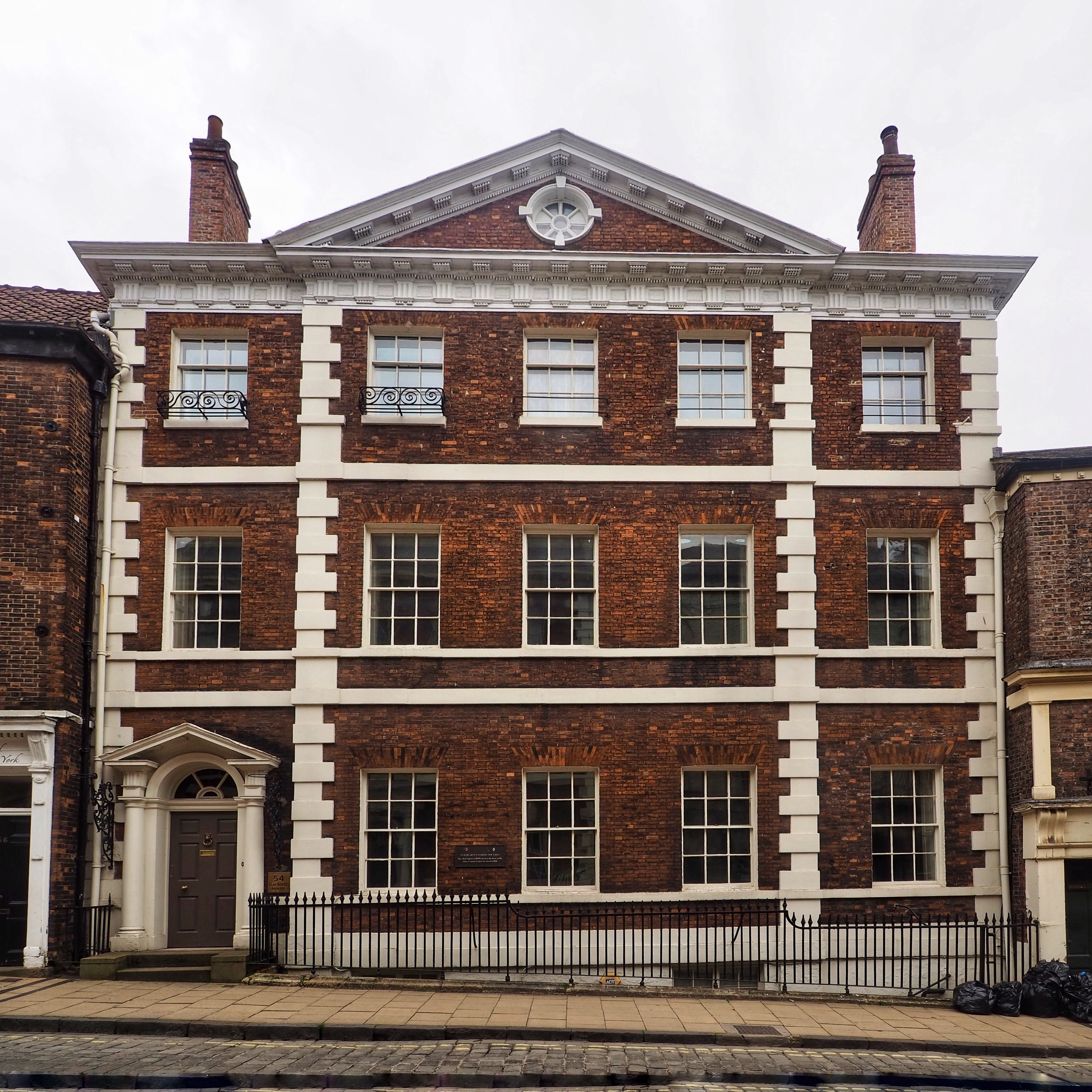
- The building in 2024

- Location within York City Centre
- Former names: St Margaret's School

General information
- Type: Townhouse
- Location: 54 Micklegate, York, England
- Coordinates: 53°57′27″N 1°05′16″W
- Year built: 1757
- Renovated: Late 19th century (altered)

Design and construction
- Architect: John Carr (probable)
- Designations

Listed Building – Grade I
- Official name: Garforth House and railings attached at front, garden wall attached at rear
- Designated: 14 June 1954
- Reference no.: 1257335

Garforth House is a Grade I listed building in the city of York, England.

The house lies at 54 Micklegate, in the city centre. The site was occupied by two tenements in the early 18th century, one of which was purchased by William Garforth, and the other by his nephew, Edmund Garforth. In the 1750s, they cleared the site for the construction of Garforth House, which is generally believed to have been designed by John Carr. It was completed around 1757, and Edmund lived there with his wife, Elizabeth, but they soon began letting it out. In 1831, it was sold to Barnard Hague.

In 1912, St Margaret's Independent Grammar School for Girls, a small religious school, moved into the building. It remained at the site until it closed in 1968, after which the building was used as offices. In 2010, it was sold and reconverted to residential use.

The house has three storeys, and its brick front was originally symmetrical, although the door on the right of the ground floor was later replaced by a window. It has stone quoins, and in its pediment is an oculus window. Its original lamp brackets survive, while balconies were added to the second-floor windows in the 19th century. The rear is of a lighter brick, and has an original drainpipe. Inside, the three floors above ground have richly decorated rooms utilising marble, many of which had original fireplaces. It has an unusual plan for the period, based on a "H" shape, with the main staircase at the rear, and a large saloon on the first floor overlooking the garden.

== See also ==
- Grade I listed buildings in the City of York
- Listed buildings in York (within the city walls, southern part)
