= Listed buildings in Acaster Malbis =

Acaster Malbis is a civil parish in the unitary authority of the City of York, North Yorkshire, England. It contains four listed buildings that are recorded in the National Heritage List for England. Of these, one is listed at Grade I, the highest of the three grades, and the others are at Grade II, the lowest grade. The parish contains the village of Acaster Malbis and the surrounding countryside. The listed buildings consist of a church, two houses and a public house.

== Key ==
Grade	Criteria
I	Buildings of exceptional interest, sometimes considered to be internationally important
II	Buildings of national importance and special interest

== Buildings ==
Name and location	Photograph	Date	Notes	Grade
Holy Trinity Church; 53.90526°N 1.09774°W		Mid-14th century	The church has been altered and extended during the centuries, especially by C. Hodgson Fowler in 1886. It is built in magnesian limestone and has a tile roof. There is a cruciform plan, consisting of a nave, a south porch, a chancel, and north and south transepts. On the crossing is a shingled bell turret with an octagonal spire. The porch has a pointed entrance with a chamfered architrave and a hood mould.	I
Hall Garth and outbuildings 53.90094°N 1.10486°W	—	Late 17th century	A farmhouse, later a private house, in red brick, with dentilled eaves, and a tile roof with signs of tumbling on the gables. There are two storeys, three bays, and extensions including a right wing. In the centre of the south front is a wooden porch on posts and a doorway, flanked by canted bay windows. The windows are casements, and the wing contains a seven-light bay window. To the west are outbuildings surrounding a small courtyard.	II
The Old Vicarage; 53.90079°N 1.10427°W		1732	The house was later extended, including the addition of a rear range. It is in pinkish-orange brick, with a stepped three-course floor band, and a pantile roof. There are two storeys, a double depth plan, and a front of two bays. On the front is a dated plaque and a doorway flanked by tripartite sash windows, and on the upper floor are two four-pane casement windows.	II
The Ship Inn; 53.90187°N 1.10382°W		Mid-18th century	The public house, which was later extended, is in pinkish-orange brick, with a floor band and a Welsh slate roof. There are two storeys and two bays. At the front is a wide flight of steps leading to a doorway flanked by sash windows. The upper floor has horizontally sliding sashes, and inside is a restored inglenook fireplace, a bread oven and a kettle arm.	II
