= Holy Trinity Church, Acaster Malbis =

Grade I listed church in York, England

Coordinates: 53.90528°N 1.09776°W

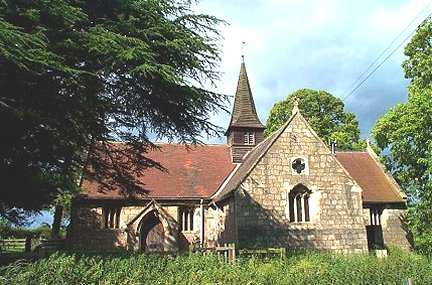
The church, in 2002

Holy Trinity Church is an active Anglican church in Acaster Malbis, a village in the City of York, in England. It is a grade I listed building.

A church has existed on this site since at least the 12th century. It was rebuilt in limestone in about 1320, by the Fairfax family. It has a cruciform plan, with a south porch, with a pointed arch. The nave is of three bays, the chancel of two, and each transept a single bay. The windows to the north and south have three lights, with a larger, five-light window at the west end, and a seven-light window at the east end. They are deeply set in arched reveals. Each light has an ogee arch, design which Nikolaus Pevsner describes as initially appearing to be a later alteration, but actually contemporary with the original construction of the church. Above the windows in the west and south gables are quatrefoil windows, a trefoil in the north transept, and a sexfoil in the east gable. The east window has stained glass of 1320, which Pevsner describes as "very fine", and some more in the south transept window.

Inside, there is a mediaeval font, sections of a mediaeval wall painting on the north wall, and a piscina with ogee arches. There is also a fourteenth-century effigy of a knight, who is thought to be John Malbys. The wooden pulpit is 17th-century, described by Pevsner as "exceptionally elaborate".

In 1886, the church was restored by C. Hodgson Fowler, and he added a wooden bell tower and spire. In 1967, it was grade I listed. A new stained glass window was added in 2019, to a design by Janet Parkin, featuring woodland creatures.

== See also ==
- Grade I listed buildings in the City of York
- Listed buildings in Acaster Malbis
