= York Assembly Rooms =

Grade I listed building in York, England

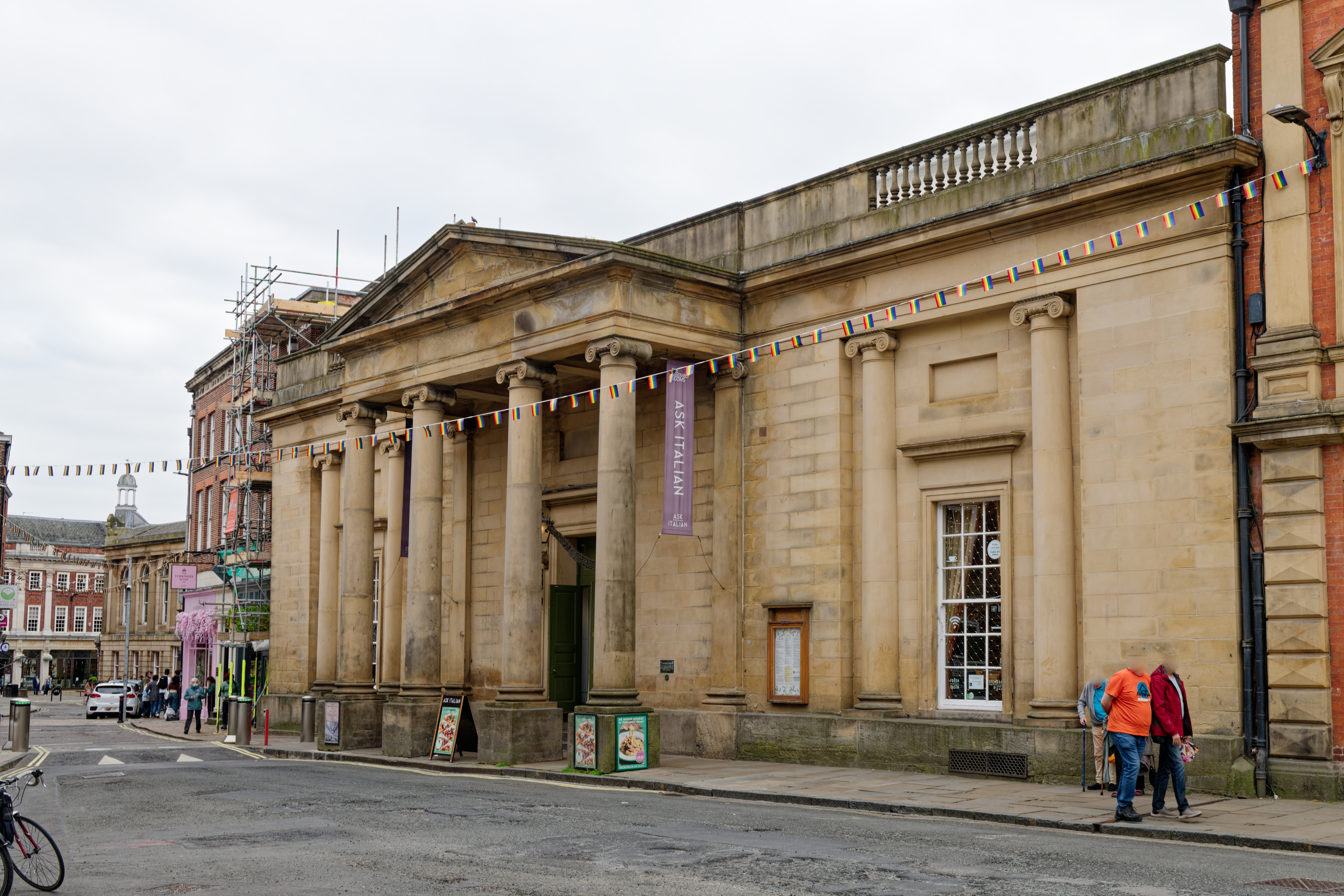
- The Neo-Palladian facade on Blake Street, York

General information
- Architectural style: Neo-Palladian
- Location: Blake Street, York, North Yorkshire, England
- Coordinates: 53.9603°N 1.0850°W
- Construction started: 1730
- Completed: 1732
- Client: Assembly Rooms Subscribers

Technical details
- Material: Magnesian Limestone

Design and construction
- Architect: Lord Burlington
Designations
Listed Building – Grade I
- Designated: 14 June 1954
- Reference no.: 1259521

The York Assembly Rooms on Blake Street, York, North Yorkshire, England, is a Grade I listed building designed by Lord Burlington in 1730 and completed in 1732.

Considered one of the earliest and finest surviving examples of high Palladian architecture and Neo-Classicism in Europe, the building was constructed as a social venue for balls, concerts, card games, and assemblies for the polite society of northern England. Historic England describes the building as being "of seminal importance in the history of English Architecture".

== History ==
=== Context and subscription ===
Following a tradition established during a visit by King Charles I in 1633, social gatherings of the regional aristocracy and gentry were originally held at the King's Manor, and later at Sir Arthur Ingram's mansion in Dean's Park. By the early 18th century, York had firmly established itself as the preeminent social capital of Northern England. During the annual horse races at Knavesmire and the judicial Assizes, vast numbers of country gentry and nobility visited the city, placing unsustainable pressure on the existing venues.

On 1 March 1730, a formal proposal led by Sir William Wentworth launched a subscription campaign that raised £3,000 across 169 shares to construct a dedicated, purpose-built assembly hall. Although local gentleman architect William Wakefield was initially selected to design the building, his death in April 1730 prompted the directors to approach Lord Burlington, who was then present in the city supervising the re-paving of the York Minster nave. Burlington volunteered his architectural services without taking a fee. Construction commenced in March 1730, managed by local craftsmen including master builders William Etty, James Disney, and plasterer John Bagnall. The rooms officially opened in August 1732 to coincide with race week.

=== 18th and 19th-century alterations ===
The original roof, designed with a low pitch, began leaking shortly after completion. In 1752, York architect John Carr carried out substantial structural repairs to the lantern roof and ceiling. Following a minor fire in 1773, Carr remodelled the Lesser Assembly Room.

Burlington's original facade projected directly into Blake Street on a high stone plinth with steps, creating significant traffic congestion for arriving horse-drawn carriages. In 1791, John Carr altered the entrance, re-siting the steps inside the portico, and in 1885, the external podium surrounding the columns was cut away to create a flat public pavement. In 1859, partition walls between the Great Assembly Room and side rooms were removed to improve internal movement.

=== 20th century to present ===
During the Second World War, the building suffered damage to its roof and clerestory windows from aerial bombing raid shockwaves. In 1950–1951, the City of York Council purchased the property and undertook a major structural restoration as part of the Festival of Britain. Artist Paul JL Wyeth was commissioned to create new hand-painted wallpaper for the Circular Room, depicting the acclamation of Roman Emperor Constantine the Great in York in AD 306.

In 2002, the council sold the Assembly Rooms to the York Conservation Trust. The Trust has since executed several major conservation projects, including a £500,000 timber and plaster ceiling reconstruction in the Great Assembly Room in 2017, the restoration of the plaster dome in the Circular Room in 2020, and comprehensive roof repairs in 2021–2022. The building is leased for commercial dining as a restaurant while remaining open for civic functions.

== Architecture ==
=== The Egyptian Hall ===
The interior is dominated by the Great Assembly Room, a rare full-scale real-life realization of the "Egyptian Hall" described by ancient Roman architect Vitruvius and recorded by Renaissance architect Andrea Palladio in his I quattro libri dell'architettura.

The Peristyle Colonnade is a continuous peristyle of 44 close-set stone columns featuring intricate Corinthian capitals surrounds the main hall, creating a narrow outer ambulatory and supporting an upper clerestory. Burlington designed the hall adhering strictly to harmonic Palladian geometry, measuring 123 feet (37 m) in length, 40 feet (12 m) in width, and 40 feet (12 m) in height.

=== Secondary rooms ===
Flanking the central hall are a series of symmetrically arranged reception rooms designed to balance the main layout. The Lesser Assembly Room are a rectangular side hall originally intended for smaller gatherings and card games. The Rotunda (Circular Room) is a domed circular chamber featuring decorative plasterwork and historical murals. Tea and Card Suites are auxiliary rooms constructed to provide refreshment and dining facilities during major social assemblies.

Interior views
Circular Room

Main Hall

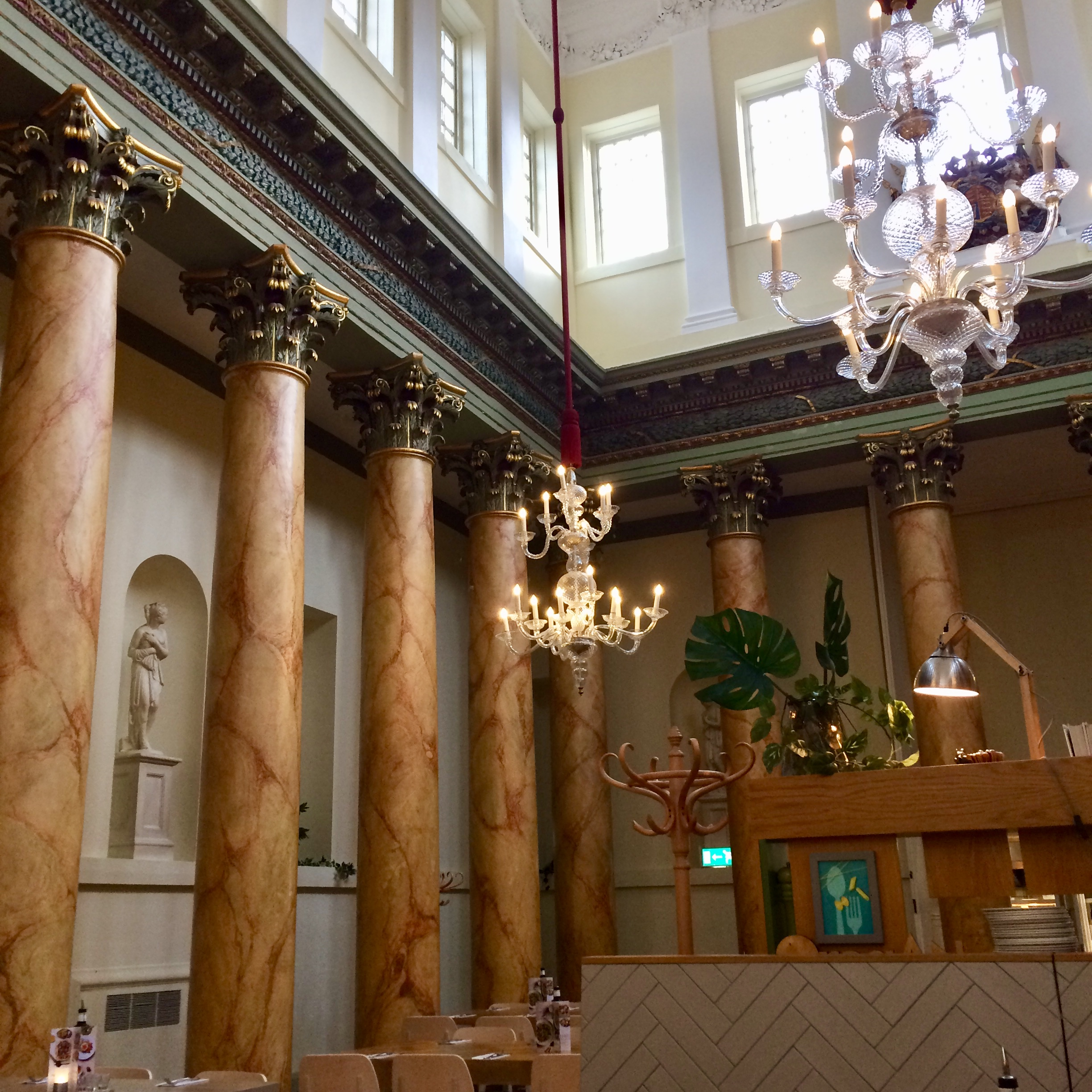
View looking up

== Notable visitors and associations ==
- Anne Lister: The 19th-century Yorkshire diarist attended assemblies at the hall. On 18 December 1809, at age 19, she was formally introduced to York high society at the venue alongside her early companion Eliza Rain.
- Lord Burlington: Architect of the hall, whose work on the site firmly established Neo-Palladianism as the dominant architectural style for English public buildings in the 18th century.
- John Carr: Prominent York architect who spent over four decades maintaining, adapting, and altering the hall to meet evolving urban needs.

== In popular culture ==
Due to its preserved Georgian interior, the York Assembly Rooms and its immediate surroundings are frequently utilized for historical productions, television documentaries, and feature films:

- The Great Assembly Room features prominently in regional cultural programs and historical documentaries focusing on Georgian England and the British Enlightenment.
- The venue is managed alongside other prominent York Conservation Trust film locations in the city center, such as Fairfax House.

== See also ==
- Grade I listed buildings in York
- Palladian architecture
- Richard Boyle, 3rd Earl of Burlington
- John Carr (architect)
