= Lendal Tower =

Medieval tower in York, England

- Part of York city walls
- York, England
- Lendal Tower in July 2026

Site information
- Type: Tower

Location
- Shown within North Yorkshire
- Location within North Yorkshire
- Coordinates: 53.9603°N 1.08717°W

Site history
- Materials: Magnesian limestone

Listed Building – Grade I
- Official name: Lendal Tower
- Designated: 14 June 1954
- Reference no.: 1257086

Lendal Tower is a medieval tower that formed part of the city defences of York, England. It is located on the east bank of the River Ouse at the point where the river enters the walled city from the north-west. The building was used as a waterworks from 1616 until 1846 after which it was converted into offices. It has since been turned into rental accommodation.

== History ==
Lendal Bridge (1863) spans the River Ouse at York, with Lendal Tower on the left – 2026

Lendal Tower was built in c. 1300 and was originally circular and similar in appearance to North Street Postern Tower (formerly known as the Barker Tower) but has since been remodelled giving it additional strength and height. Along with North Street Postern Tower, on the opposite bank, it was built to control access to the city by way of an iron chain which was stretched across the river to impose the payment of tolls and from medieval times until the construction of Lendal Bridge in 1863 a ferry service crossed the river between the two towers. Lendal Tower is first recorded in the Custody of 1315 (Note: The Custody of 1315 was one of a number of documents that set out plans for the defence of York.) as Turrim Sancti Leonardi (Tower of St Leonards). In 1569 bulwarks were added to the city defences as protection against the rebel Earls of Northumberland and Westmorland and repairs to the tower were undertaken in 1584–85.

From 1616 the tower was being used as part of an effort to operate a piped water supply for the city. Historic England notes that the structure was heightened in 1616; engravings by William Lodge (1678) depict it as being of three storeys. They also show it to be in a state of disrepair, as was the case in 1646, which may have been caused during the Siege of York. The tower was now known as 'the waterhouse' and in 1677 a new scheme was proposed for its use. A lease of 500 years was granted for a peppercorn rent and permission was granted for improvements to be made. The building was enlarged and strengthened in 1682 to accommodate a lead cistern. Water was pumped in using either a windmill or a waterwheel but this proved problematic and within a few years it was replaced by a horse engine situated within the tower.

The next major developments came in the 1750s with the installation of a Newcomen steam engine which was rebuilt to the designs of John Smeaton in the 1780s when further expansion to the building took place. Hot and cold baths were also built in a building adjoining the tower. The engine was moved to a nearby engine house in 1836 then following the establishment of the York New Waterworks Company in 1846 the waterworks were moved to Acomb Landing. The tower was reduced in height and remodelled by G.T. Andrews who gave the tower a more medieval appearance by adding the crenellations. (Note: The changes made by Andrews can be seen in two paintings of Lendal Tower of c. 1840 and c. 1850 by Henry Barlow Carter.) It was retained by the waterworks company who converted it for use as their offices in 1932. It was designated as a Grade I listed building in 1954 and, as part of the city historic defences, is also protected as a scheduled monument. Since 2010 it has been refurbished for residential use before being marketed as rental accommodation.

== Architecture ==
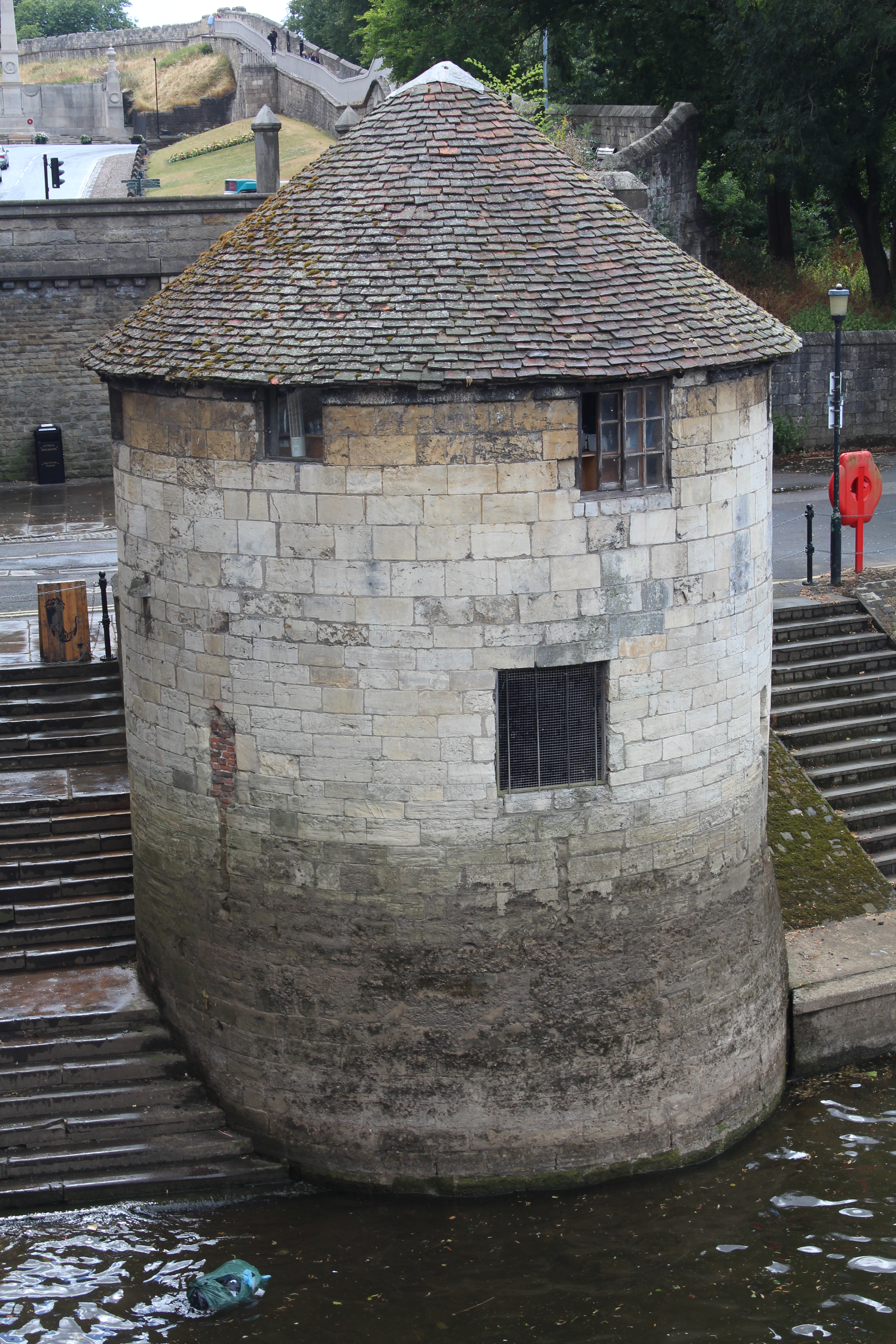
North Street Postern Tower – similar to the original design of Lendal Tower

Lendal Tower was originally a circular building of 28 feet (8.5 m) in diameter, with a rounded turret to house a wooden spiral staircase, to which a 17th–century rectangular extension on the south-east of the structure has been added.

The building is of Magnesian limestone some of which is thought to be from the nearby St Mary's Abbey which was dissolved in 1539 and later used as a source of stone for several buildings in the city. The tower has crenellated walls which were added in 1846 and a copper roof which has been converted into a roof terrace. The brickwork of the internal structure was used to support the 18th–century engines. A lift was installed as part of the refurbishment in 1932 at which time the Jacobean style decoration and panelling was also added.

== See also ==
- Grade I listed buildings in the City of York
- Listed buildings in York (within the city walls, northern part)
