= Holy Trinity Church, Goodramgate, York =

Grade I listed church in York, England

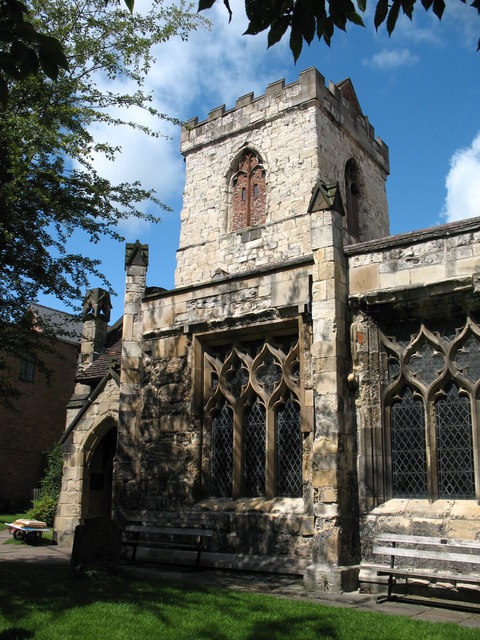
- Holy Trinity Church, Goodramgate, York
- Holy Trinity Church, Goodramgate, York
- 53°57′41.26″N 1°4′49.09″W
- OS grid reference: SE 60435 52052
- Location: York
- Country: England
- Previous denomination: Church of England

History
- Dedication: Holy Trinity

Architecture
- Heritage designation: Grade I listed

Holy Trinity Church, on Goodramgate in York, is a Grade I listed former parish church in the Church of England in York and is in the care of the Churches Conservation Trust.

== History ==
The church dates from the 12th century. The south east chapel is 13th century, and the south aisle and south arcade date from the 14th century. The original construction is of limestone, with later repairs and additions in brick. The church contains memorials to a number of notable York residents.

It was enlarged in 1823 when the north side was rebuilt. The south porch was added in 1849. The condition of the building was poor by 1882 and regular worship was suspended for over 50 years until 1937 when restoration work was completed. The oak rafters were renewed and the roof was restored. The pier supporting the arches between the nave and north aisle were underpinned with concrete, and the decaying stonework on the south aisle walls was renewed.

== Parish status ==
The church was declared redundant on 29 June 1971, and was vested in the care of the Churches Conservation Trust on 7 November 1972. A restoration was carried out between 1973 and 1974.

== Memorials ==
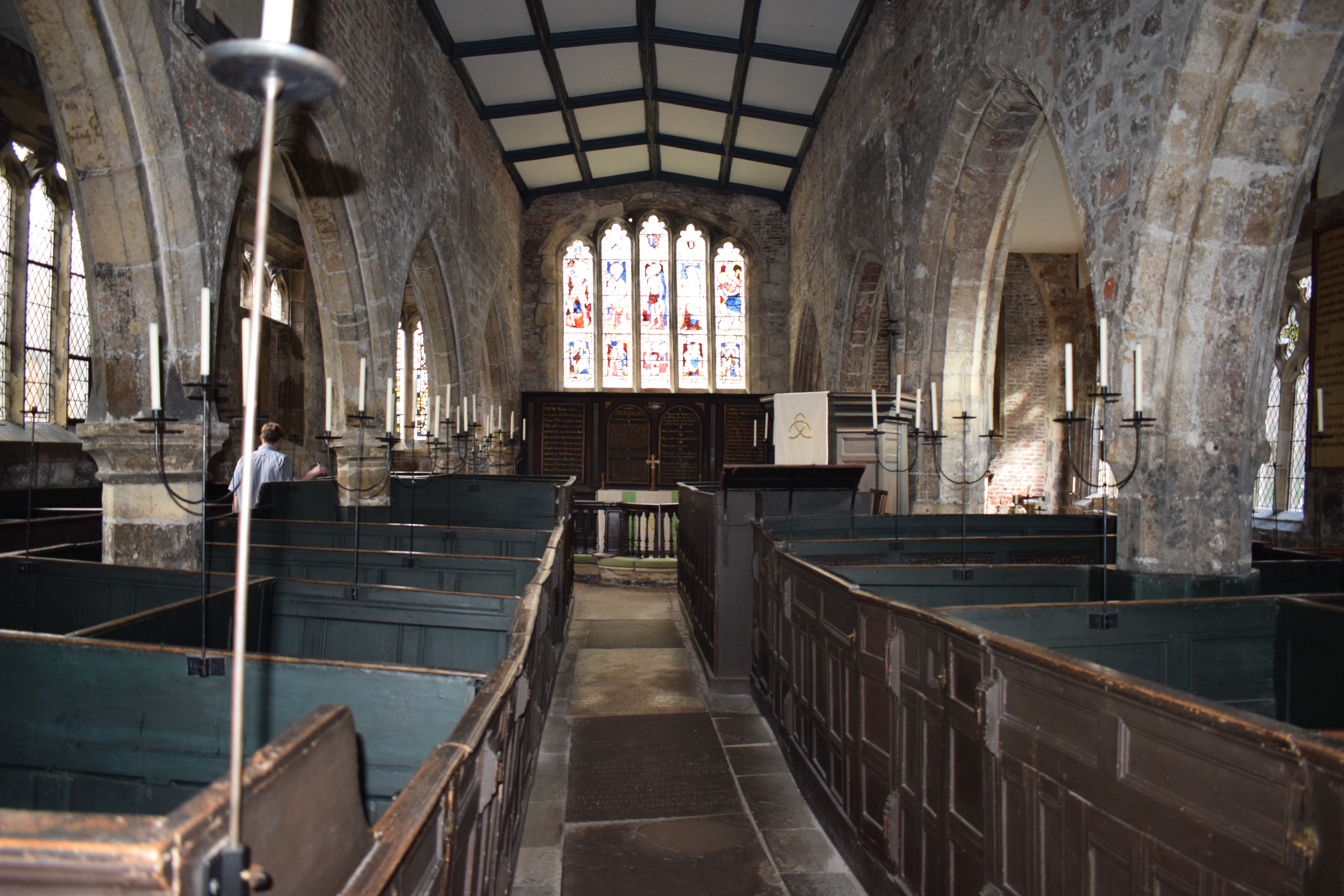
Interior of Holy Trinity showing the box pews

- Frances Graham (d. 1721)
- James Robert Fryer (d. 1840)
- The Revd James Dallin (d. 1838)
- Joseph Smith (d. 1827)
- Joseph Buckle (d. 1818)

== Plaque ==
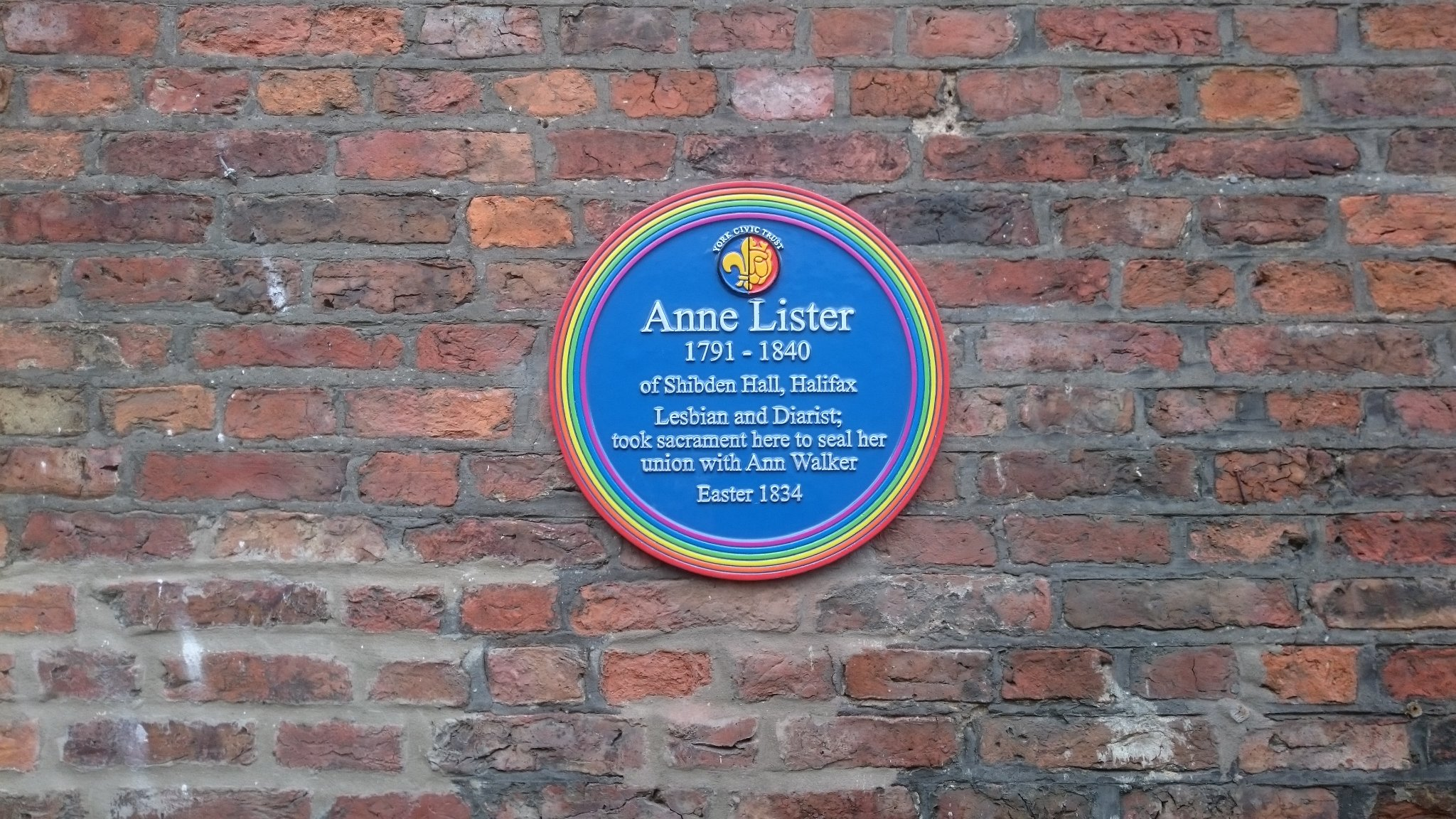
Rainbow plaque in York dedicated to Anne Lister as seen in May 2019

In 2018, a blue plaque was unveiled outside of the church to mark the occasion when Anne Lister and her partner, Ann Walker, took Holy Communion together at the church at Easter 1834 as an affirmation of their lesbian relationship, thereafter considering themselves married; it was York's first LGBT history plaque. The first plaque had an upside down rainbow edging and read "Gender-nonconforming entrepreneur. Celebrated marital commitment, without legal recognition, to Ann Walker in this church. Easter, 1834".

The wording was criticised for not mentioning Lister's sexuality, and in 2019 it was replaced with a similar rainbow plaque with the wording "Anne Lister 1791–1840 of Shibden Hall, Halifax / Lesbian and Diarist; took sacrament here to seal her union with Ann Walker / Easter 1834". The ceremony was recreated on location in the church for the series finale of the 2019 BBC dramatisation of the life of Anne Lister, Gentleman Jack starring Suranne Jones and Sophie Rundle as Lister and Walker respectively.

== See also ==
- Grade I listed buildings in the City of York
- List of churches preserved by the Churches Conservation Trust in Northern England
- Listed buildings in York (within the city walls, northern part)
