= Acaster Malbis =

Village and civil parish in North Yorkshire, England

Coordinates: 53.9019°N 1.10691°W

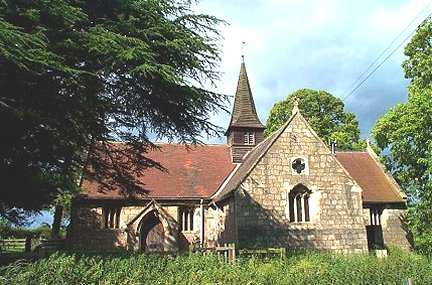
- Holy Trinity church, Acaster Malbis

- Location within North Yorkshire
- Population: 669 (2011 census)
- OS grid reference: SE587454
  - London: 170 mi (270 km) S
- Unitary authority: City of York
- Ceremonial county: North Yorkshire
- Region: Yorkshire and the Humber
- Country: England
- Sovereign state: United Kingdom
- Post town: YORK
- Postcode district: YO23
- Dialling code: 01904
- Police: North Yorkshire
- Fire: North Yorkshire
- Ambulance: Yorkshire
- UK Parliament: York Outer

Acaster Malbis (/ˈeɪkæstər ˈmælbɪs/) is a village and civil parish in the unitary authority of the City of York, England. It is located on the River Ouse, almost 5 miles (8 km) south of York. Nearby are the villages of Copmanthorpe 2 miles (3.2 km) to the north-west, Bishopthorpe 2 miles to the north and Appleton Roebuck 3.5 miles (6 km) to the south-west. The parish covers an area of about 2,000 acres (810 ha).

The Latin word for a camp is castra indicating that the Roman army may once have been based here. The village is mentioned in the Domesday Book of 1086 as "Acastre". The "Malbis" is derived from the Norman Malbysse or De Malebys family. Malbis was a Norman personal name which in French means "very swarthy".

There was a Royal Air Force station next to the village during and immediately after the Second World War.

According to the 2001 census the parish had a population of 578, increasing to 669 at the 2011 census. There are two churches and an inn in the village. The village is also the home for a holiday park.

The village was historically part of the West Riding of Yorkshire until 1974. It was then a part of the district of Selby District in North Yorkshire from 1974 until 1996. Since 1996 it has been part of the City of York unitary authority.

== History ==
=== Early history ===
The land on which the village stands was named by the Romans as Val-Caester. In Latin, Val means "a wall" and Castrum means a "camp". When the Romans departed the land was acquired by an Anglo-Saxon called Aca.

The village is mentioned in the Domesday Book as Acastre in the wapentake of Ainsty and was recorded as belonging to two men, Elsi and Robert. Ownership passed to the Malbysse family during the reign of Richard I. The family held the lands for about 200 years. In 1190, Richard Malebysse was a leader involved in the massacre of the Jews at Cliffords Tower in York. Richard I dismissed the sheriff and constable of York and imposed severe penalties on the city and arrested many of those who had taken part. Richard Malbysse had been described by a Hebrew scribe eight years earlier as "the evil beast". As punishment, the King ordered his estates seized into the king's hand and two of his esquires were thrown into prison.

In 1314, John De Malbysse was appointed as a sheriff of the county. His daughter married into the Fairfax family who then inherited the lands after the deaths of John De Malbysse and his son Walter. The Fairfax family held the estates until 1745 when it was sold to Lady Dawes and was eventually inherited by Lord Wenlock.

During the English Civil War, the city of York was under siege from Scottish and Parliamentarian Armies. They had settled around the city in a great arc, with Lord Thomas Fairfax's army to the east and the Scots to the south and west. A bridge of boats, similar to those constructed at Nether Poppleton, was constructed over the River Ouse at Acaster Malbis to allow communications between the two armies.

=== RAF Acaster Malbis ===
RAF Acaster Malbis, situated between the villages of Acaster Malbis and Acaster Selby, was commissioned in 1942. Originally it was a grass airfield used by the No 601 Squadron Auxiliary Air Force from 6 January 1942 until April of that year. They flew American Bell P39 Airacobra fighter planes. From 6 April 1942 until the beginning of 1943 No 15 Pilots Advanced Flying Unit was established here to train recently qualified pilots to convert to twin-engine aeroplanes using the Airspeed Oxford aircraft.

On 25 January 1943 the airfield was reconstructed into a full size 'Class A' bomber station, with three concrete runways, steel hangars and new administration buildings. Initially the airfield was used as a relief landing ground for heavy bombers stationed at Rufforth and Marston Moor. From November 1944, No 4 Aircrew School took over for pilots, navigators, and air gunners to complete their ground training whilst waiting for a posting to a squadron. In 1945 there were between 200 and 300 RAF personnel living on the camp.

After the end of the war, RAF Acaster Malbis was home to No 91 MU (Maintenance Unit) who were responsible for the storage and disposal of vast amounts of ammunition. This function was not complete until well into the 1950s. RAF Acaster Malbis was decommissioned in 1963 and the land sold by public auction. It resumed operations as a private airfield in the mid-1970s until the mid-1980s. Large parts of the runways have since been dug up and the buildings have fallen into disuse with many being demolished, although one hangar and the control tower still remain.

== Governance ==
Acaster Malbis lies in the Bishopthorpe Ward of the Unitary Authority of the City of York. It forms part of the UK Parliamentary Constituency of York Outer. It was part of the EU Constituency of Yorkshire and the Humber until Brexit in 2020. In 2011 the Ward was won by Councillor John Galvin, a member of the local Conservative Party, after holding the seat in 2015 he again won the seat in 2019, this time as an Independent.

== Demography ==
In 1848 the population of the village was recorded as 322, just under half of the whole population of the parish of the same name. By 1881 this had fallen to 230. According to the 2001 census the parish had a population of 578, which rose to 669 by the time of the 2011 UK Census.

Population
Year	1801	1811	1821	1831	1841	1851	1881	1891	1901	1911	1921	1931	1951	1961	2001	2011
Total	265	286	291	282	322	231	264	243	227	222	225	271	959	271	578	669

== Community ==
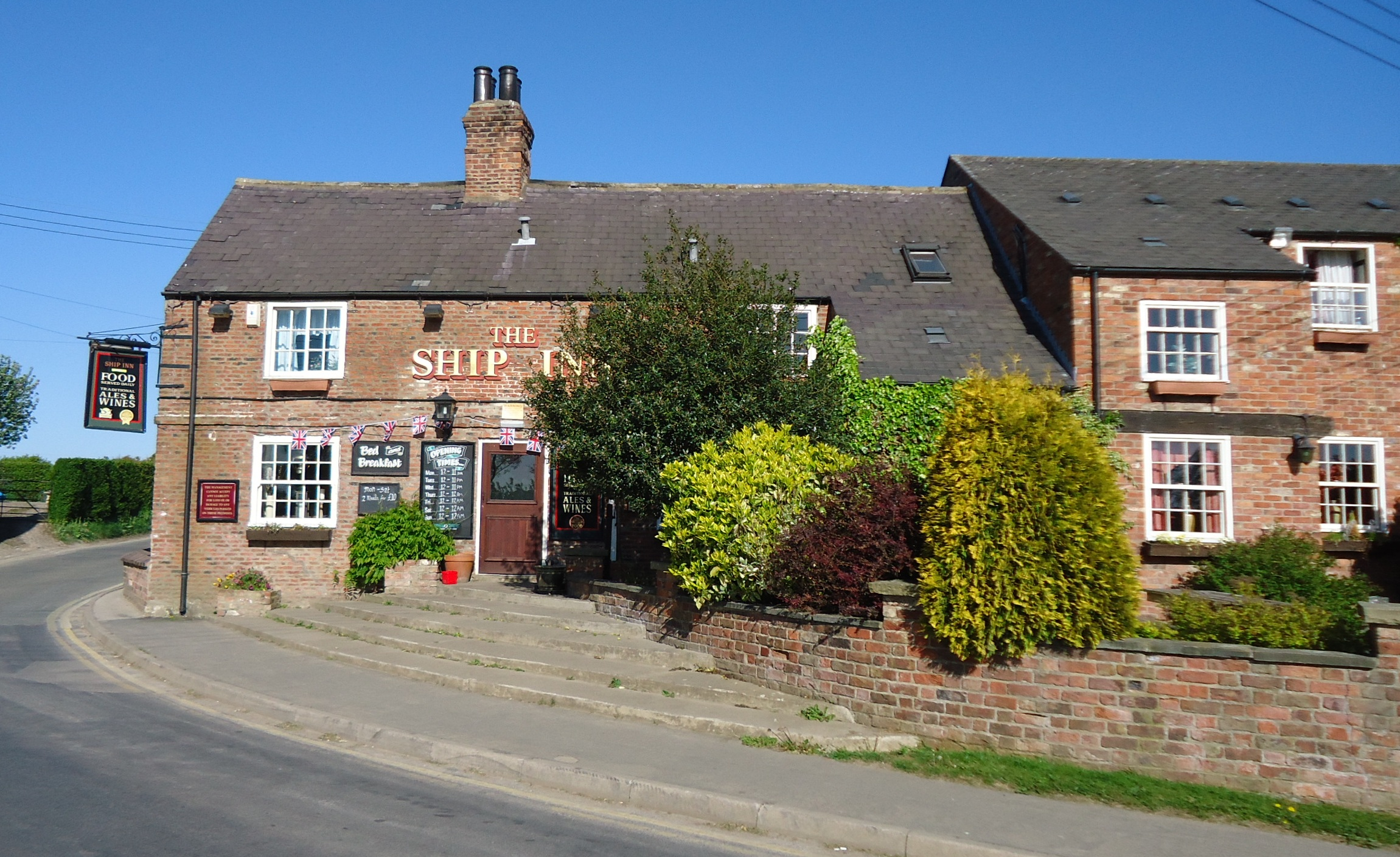
The Ship Inn, May 2011

There are few amenities in the village save for the 17th-century public house, The Ship Inn. This Inn features in the book, The Girl with the Red Suspenders by Barbara Whitehead. The inn reopened in May 2009 after nine months of major refurbishment, following serious flooding when the River Ouse burst its banks.

The owners of the inn have reported a number of incidents allegedly involving ghosts.

== Education ==
Acaster Malbis used to have brick built school, founded by John Knowles in 1603. As of 2010, primary education is provided at Archbishop of York's CE Junior School in Bishopthorpe.

The village is in the Secondary School catchment area for Fulford School and Millthorpe School in York and also for Tadcaster Grammar School.

== Religion ==
There are two churches in the village. Holy Trinity Church, the Church of England parish church, stands on the site of the original Norman Church. In 1360 the estates of the Malbysse family passed into the hands of the Fairfax family, who pulled the old church down. The church stands a little way out of the village on the road to Bishopthorpe. It is a Grade I listed building.

There is also a Methodist Church in the centre of the village, founded in 1880.

== See also ==
- Listed buildings in Acaster Malbis

== Gallery ==
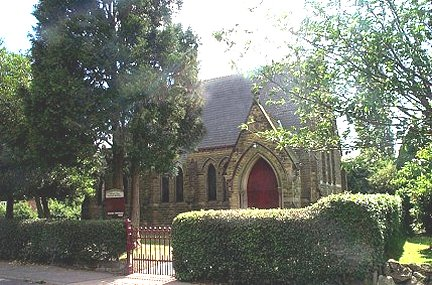
Methodist Church

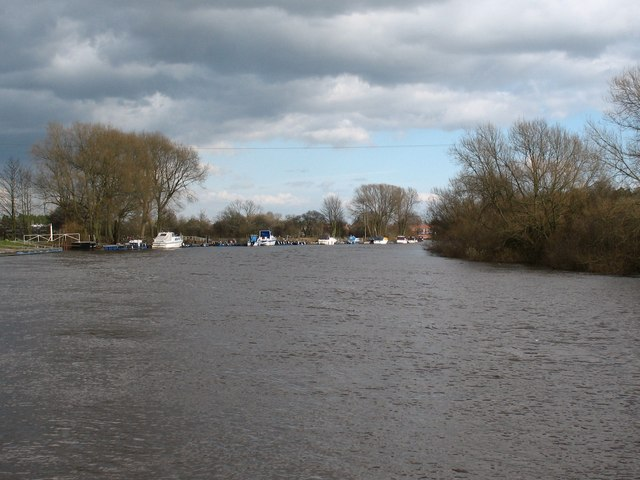
The River Ouse at Acaster Malbis

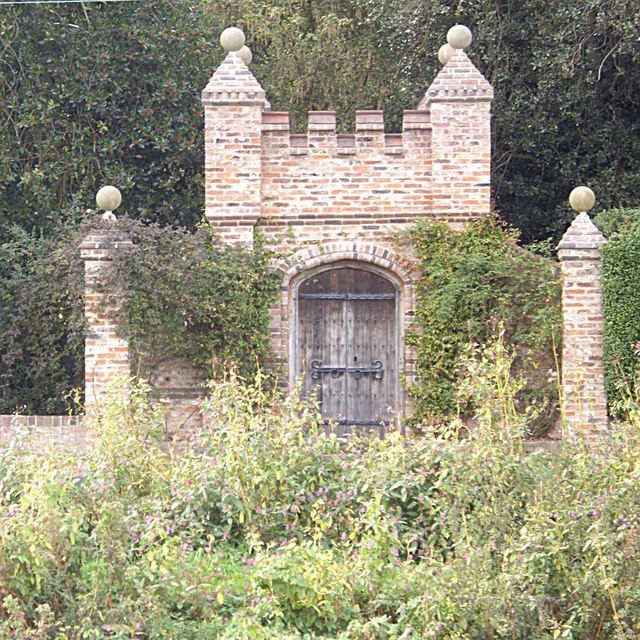
The gate folly in Acaster Malbis
