= The Norman House (York) =

Grade I listed building in York, England

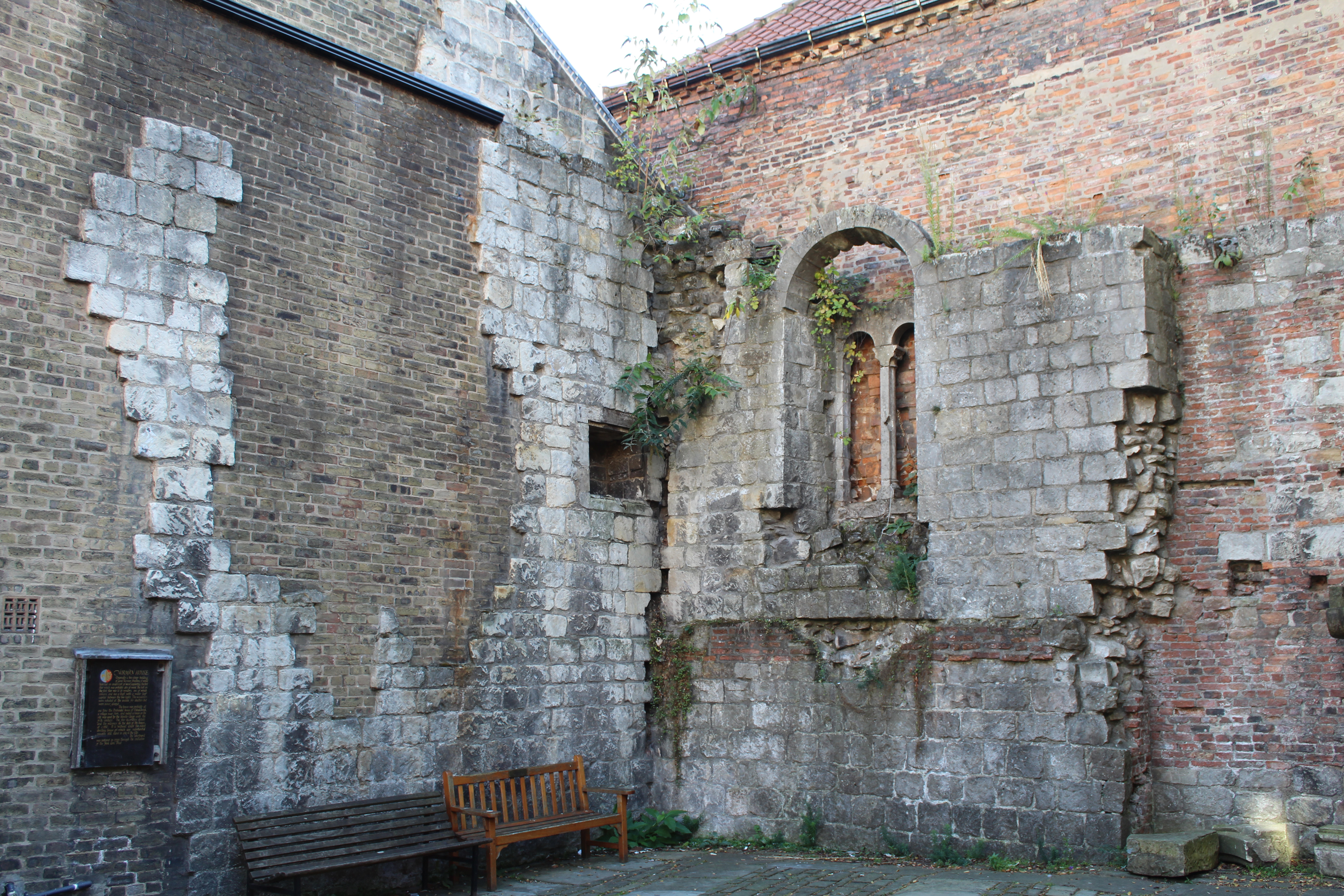
- Remains of The Norman House

- Location within York Central

General information
- Status: Ruins
- Location: Stonegate, York, England
- Coordinates: 53.9613°N 1.0830°W
- Year built: Late 12th century

Scheduled monument
- Official name: Medieval stone town house known as The Norman House to the rear of Nos 48 and 50 Stonegate
- Designated: 19 September 1951
- Reference no.: 1020406

Listed Building – Grade I
- Official name: The Norman House
- Designated: 14 June 1954
- Reference no.: 1256494

The Norman House is a scheduled monument and Grade I listed building in the city centre of York, England. Although in ruins, it has been described as "York's oldest house", dating from the late 12th century.

== History ==
The building is about 14 metres (46 ft) to the north of the street of Stonegate. Although the area had been occupied in the Roman Eboracum period, it had been abandoned. It is believed that it was open ground until new building plots were laid out under the influence of the clergy of York Minster, as it lay within the Liberty of St Peter.

While many of the new buildings were tenements, others were impressive houses, several of which were used by religious office-holders. The Norman House was a two-storey structure, built of Magnesian Limestone, and based on surviving walls, each floor measured at least 11 feet (3.4 m) by 6 feet (1.8 m). The ground floor undercroft had three pillars, supporting the upper storey. This was probably an open hall, and it was lit by windows to the south-west.

The York Civic Trust speculates that the house may originally have been built as the house of a Jewish financier. The Jews in York were massacred in 1190, and by the time the house was first recorded, in 1376, it belonged to the prebend of Ampleforth. It remained in use by clergy linked to the Minster for the next few centuries. It was largely demolished in or before the 18th century, but two walls survived, incorporated in later buildings.

In 1939, demolition of later buildings revealed the two surviving walls of the house, and also the bases of the pillars of the undercroft, and the base of a garderobe shaft. The shaft and pillars were three-and-a-half feet below the current ground level, and so were covered over, but the walls were preserved, and the former interior of the building made into a small courtyard, so that the remains can be viewed from the inside. They are accessed by a snickelway, running between numbers 50 and 52 Stonegate.

The south-east wall is believed to have been a gable end. Its stonework is only present in patches, infilled with later brick, but it does include a cupboard, with grooves showing where doors and a shelf would have sat. The south-west wall is more complete, and includes a double-arched window, in the Norman style. The north-west wall is of a later date, but includes some stones taken from the original house.

In 1951, the house was designated a scheduled monument, and in 1954 it also became a Grade I listed building. Although it is in ruins, the Civic Trust describes it as "York's oldest house", while An Inventory of the Historical Monuments in City of York states that "the remains are of great historical interest".

== See also ==
- Grade I listed buildings in the City of York
- Listed buildings in York (within the city walls, northern part)
