= St Helen's Church, Wheldrake =

Grade I listed church in York, England

Coordinates: 53.8966°N 0.9624°W

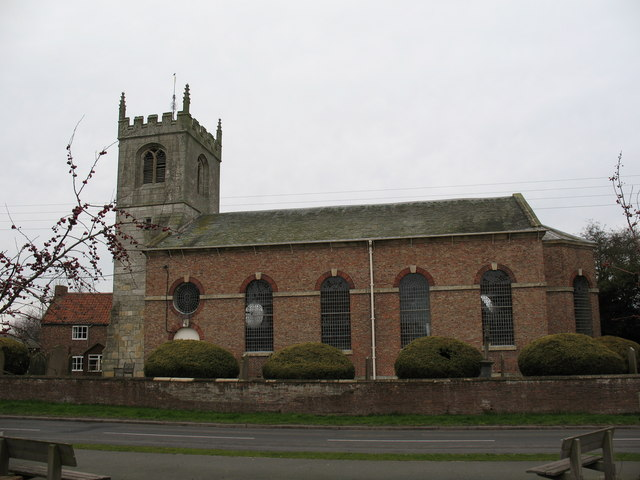
The church, seen from the south

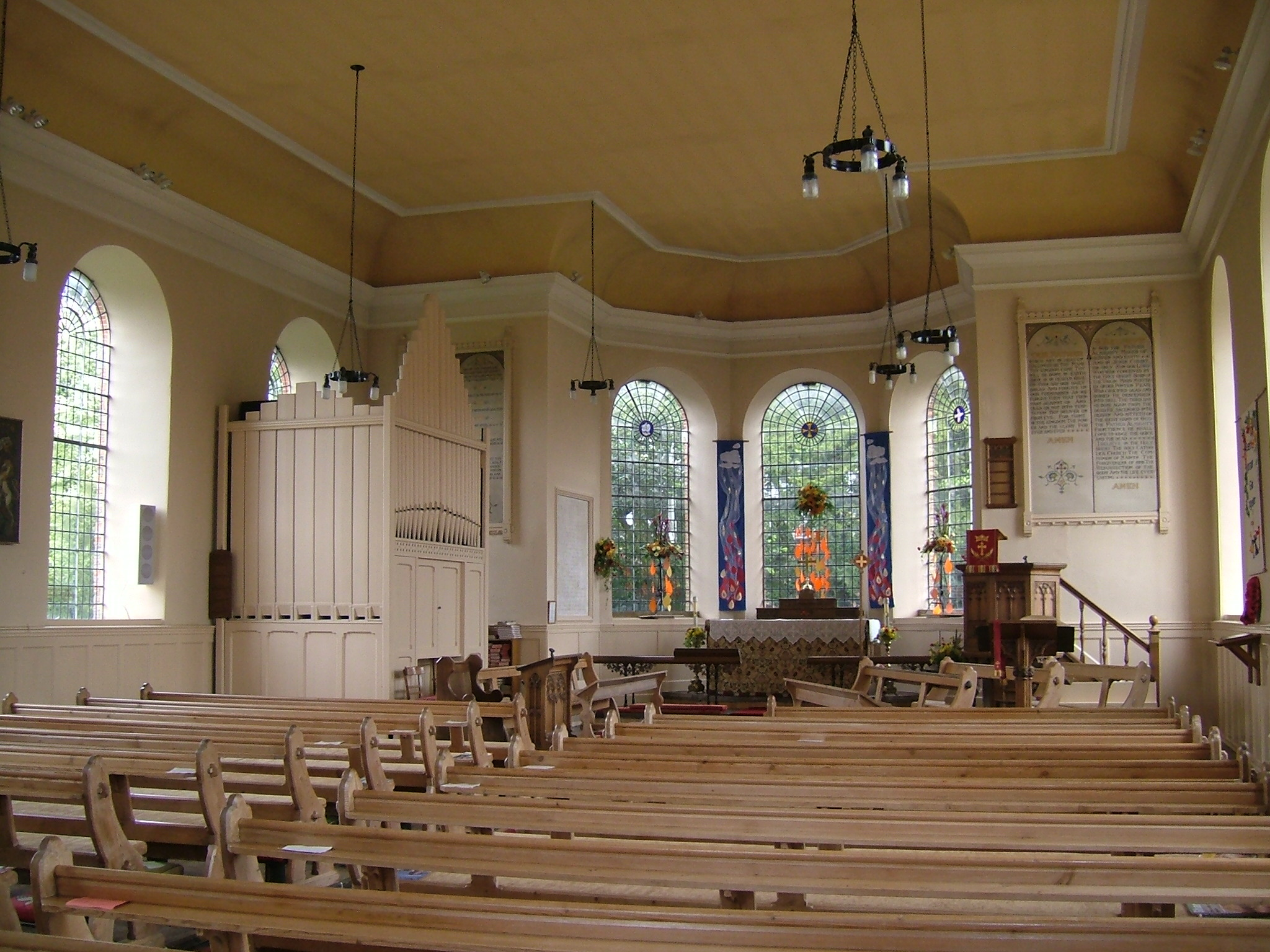
Interior of the church, in 2006

St Helen's Church is the parish church in Wheldrake, a village in the rural south-eastern part of the City of York, in England.

The oldest part of the church is the tower, which dates from the 14th century, but was rebuilt in the 15th century, with larger stones. It is built of limestone, in two stages, and has small diagonal buttresses. The door and windows have pointed arches, and there is a vestry on the north side. By the late-18th century, the church was ruinous, and the nave was demolished and rebuilt in brick in 1779. It has round arched windows, and an apse, and is described by Nikolaus Pevsner as "handsome, rectangular [and] well-lit".

The church's font dates from the 13th century, while most of the other fittings date from an 1874 refurbishment, which gave the interior a Gothic appearance. The pulpit and altar furnishings were carved in 1910 by Robert Thompson. In the 1970s, Victorian stained glass windows were replaced with clear glass.
