= Bell Hall =

Grade I listed building in York, England

Coordinates: 53.8865°N 1.0892°W

Entrance front of the house, in 1922

Bell Hall is a grade I listed building, in Naburn, in the rural southern part of the city of York, in England.

The house was built in 1680 for John Hewley, in pink-orange brick, with stone dressings, a rendered basement, and a slate roof. As built, it was rectangular in plan, approximately 60 by 45 feet, with entrances on the south and west fronts, each of which was symmetrical. The architect is not known with certainty, but is suggested by Historic England to be John Etty, father of William Etty. The ground floor contained a substantial entrance hall, a parlour, a dining room and a library; the first floor a drawing room and several sitting rooms; and the basement accommodation for servants and a kitchen. In about 1717, a kitchen wing was added on the eastern side.

Both the main and rear staircases survive from the original build, and alterations have been relatively minor, such as the replacement of entrance doors and external steps in the 19th century, and 20th century sundials added above each entrance. Original panelling and fireplaces survive in most rooms. In the entrance hall is a Jacobean overmantel, brought from Deighton Hall, and a side room has an overmantel brought in about 1750 from a house on St Saviourgate in York. The old drawing room has several painted wooden panels, probably of French or Flemish origin.

The house was listed at grade I in 1952.
