= 41–45 Goodramgate =

Grade I listed building in York, England

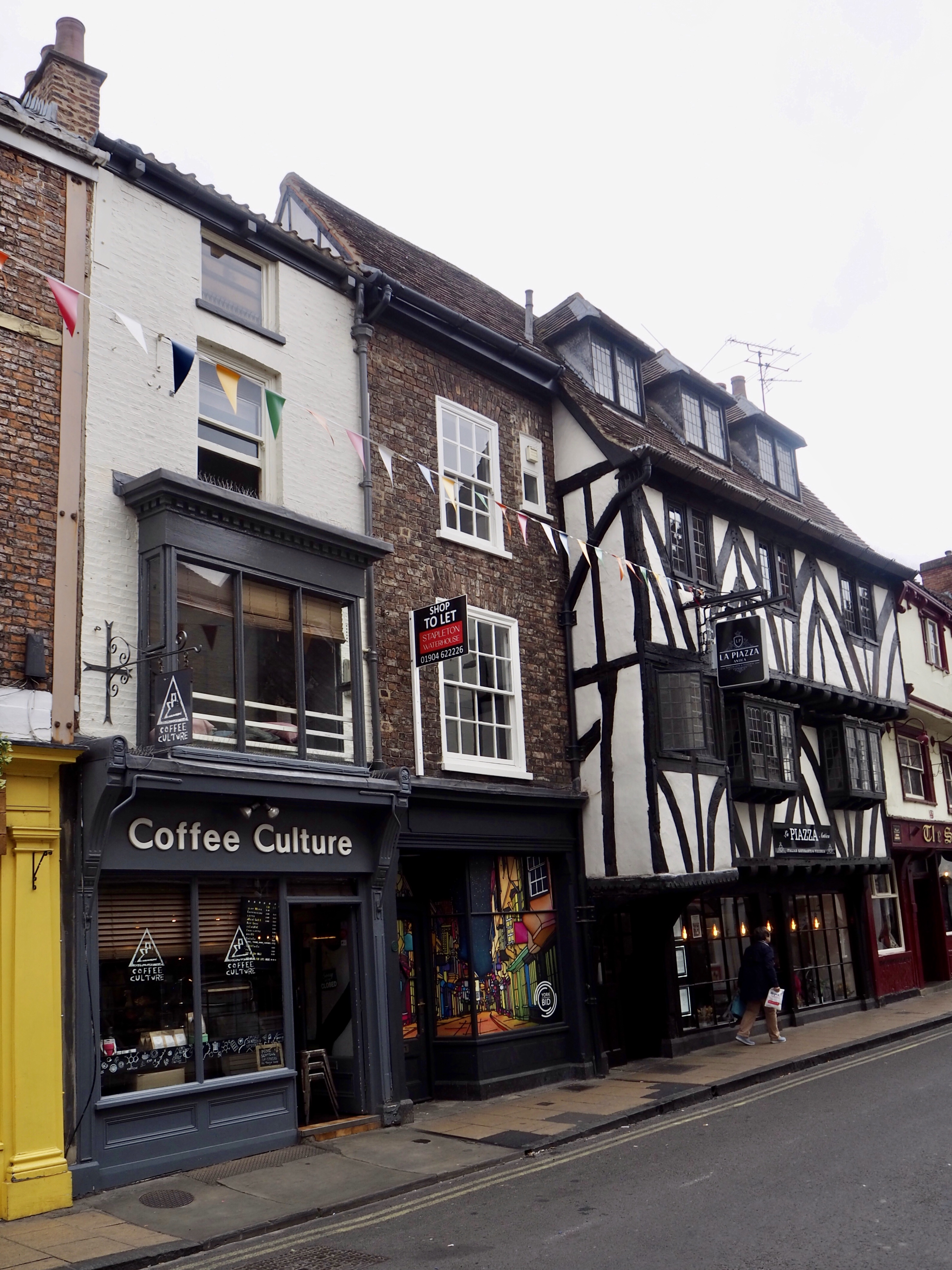
- 41–45 Goodramgate in 2023

- Location within York Central

General information
- Location: Goodramgate, York, England
- Coordinates: 53.9615°N 1.0797°W
- Year built: c. 1500
- Renovated: Early 17th century (extended); Early 19th century (No. 43 remodelled); Mid-19th century (No. 41 remodelled); 20th century (altered and extended); 1929 (No. 45 restored)

Listed Building – Grade I
- Official name: Nos. 41, 43 and 45, Goodramgate
- Designated: 14 June 1954
- Reference no.: 1257738

41–45 Goodramgate is a Grade I listed building in the city centre of York, England.

Most of the building was constructed in 1500: a three-storey, five-bay range facing onto the east side Goodramgate, and a single-storey hall behind its northern part. It probably originated as the house of a wealthy citizen, with a shop at the front. Early in the 1600s, a further two-storey building was constructed south of the single-storey range about six feet away from it, and the gap between the two was closed up soon after. A passageway ran back-to-front through the central part of the building.

By 1800, the front of the building had been plastered over, and shop windows had been installed on the ground floor, with leaded lights in the windows above. These were replaced by sash windows by the end of the century. Both 41 and 43 Goodramgate were refronted in brick during the 1800s. The property was bought by Cuthbert Morrell in the 1920s, and in 1929, Walter Brierley and Harvey Rutherford restored the building. They removed the external plaster to reveal the timber framing, all internal partitions erected over the past few centuries were removed, and the passageway was closed off.

The building now forms three properties. 41 Goodramgate is of four storeys, its attic having been converted into an extra floor, while 43 Goodramgate is the same height but of only three storeys, its floor heights having been altered. 45 Goodramgate is the largest property, incorporating both the buildings to the rear. It is the only one to retain its jettied front. Although there are windows in the roof, added in 1929, it remains of three storeys, the roof windows providing extra illumination for the second floor. The timber framing inside is largely intact, although heavily restored. Few other original fixtures remain although there is a cornice and simple fireplace on the first floor.

45 Goodramgate was listed in 1954, as an example of a rare building type, with few examples known nationally, while 41 and 43 Goodramgate were added to the listing in 1971. In 1957, 45 Goodramgate was donated to the York Civic Trust, who lease it out for use as a restaurant. 41 and 43 Goodramgate are a separate cafe and shop.

== See also ==
- Grade I listed buildings in the City of York
- Listed buildings in York (within the city walls, northern part)
