= Female Prison, York =

Listed former prison in York, England

- The building in 2026

- Location within York City Centre

General information
- Status: Part of York Castle Museum
- Type: Women's prison (former)
- Location: Eye of York, York, England
- Coordinates: 53.955587°N 1.0783352°W
- Grid position: SE 60578 51448
- Year built: 1780–1783

Design and construction
- Architects: Thomas Wilkinson and John Prince
- Designations

Listed Building – Grade I
- Official name: Castle Museum, the Female Prison
- Designated: 14 June 1954
- Reference no.: 1259324

The Female Prison is a former women's prison and a Grade I listed building in the city of York, England. Since 1938 it has been part of the York Castle Museum.

== History ==
The prison and yard were built between 1780 and 1783 at a cost of £1,540 and to a design by Thomas Wilkinson and John Prince. The frontage of the building matches that of the court building on the opposite side of the bailey. The prison was altered and wings added in 1802 with a podium and steps added between 1820 and 1850. The front of the building is constructed from sandstone ashlar with the inside of the portico rendered. The prison was bought by the City of York Corporation in 1934 opening as the Castle Museum in 1938.

=== 21st century ===
In January 2023, a wall on the outside of the Female Prison was daubed with "offensive graffiti". A 17-year-old boy was subsequently arrested on suspicion of racially aggravated criminal damage and being in possession of articles to commit criminal damage. On 27 September 2023, the Female Prison part of the museum was closed to the public as a precaution, following the discovery of RAAC in its roof.

== Executions ==
The castle area became the regular place of executions in York in the early 1800s, replacing the Tyburn on the Knavesmire. The new gallows were completed on 8 March 1801 at a cost of £10 and 15 shillings and were first used for the execution of a cattle thief, Samuel Lundy, on 11 April 1801. Condemned criminals were hanged in this space, known as 'the Drop', between the Assize Courts and the bailey wall until 1868. From 1868 to 1896 executions took place inside the prison walls at the north end of the Female prison. A total of 153 men and seven women were hanged in the castle precincts between April 1801 and December 1896.

Mary Bateman, known as the 'Yorkshire Witch', was executed at the castle on 20 March 1809.

A 1998 archaeological excavation immediately to the north of the Female Prison located five graves, thought to date between 1802 and 1826. The skeletal remains were analysed and are thought to represent executed prisoners from the site. One of the skeletons, an adult female (aged 18–25 at death), had had a post-mortem craniotomy performed on her, though it is unclear whether this was performed as an autopsy or for anatomical dissection in the interests of science. The Murder Act 1752 stipulated that only the corpses of murderers could be used for dissection, though this was changed by the Anatomy Act 1832 which provided provision for surgeons and physicians to access cadavers that were unclaimed after death.

== See also ==
- Grade I listed buildings in the City of York
- Listed buildings in York (within the city walls, southern part)
