= List of guilds in the United Kingdom =

This is a list of guilds in the United Kingdom. It includes guilds of merchants and other trades, both those relating to specific trades, and the general guilds merchant in Glasgow and Preston. No religious guilds survive, and the guilds of freemen in some towns and cities are not listed. Almost all guilds were founded by the end of the 17th century, although some went out of existence and were refounded in the 20th century.

== England ==
=== Alnwick ===
Black and White Smiths
Butchers
Cordwainers
Joiners and Shoemakers
Merchants
Skinners and Glovers
Tanners
Weavers

=== Bristol ===
Society of Merchant Venturers (1552), meets Merchant Hall

=== Carlisle ===
Butchers
Cordwainers
Merchants
Skinners and Glovers

=== Chester ===
Bakers (1462)
Barber Surgeons
Brewers
Bricklayers
Butchers
Cappers and Pinners
Coopers
Cordwainers
Goldsmiths (1573)
Innholders
Joiners (1578)
Masons
Mercers
Merchant Drapers
Merchant Taylors
Painters (1534)
Saddlers & Curriers
Skinners
Smiths
Tanners (1361)
Weavers
Wet and Dry Glovers (1380)
Wrights and Slaters

=== Cirencester ===
Weavers' Company (1550s), meets Weavers' Hall

=== Coventry ===
Broad Weavers and Clothiers (1665)
Company and Fellowship of Cappers and Feltmakers (1494); meets in Cappers' Room of old cathedral
Drapers (1534); meets in Drapers' Hall
Fellowship of Mercers
Fullers' Guild (1438)
Tanners' Guild
Worshipful Company of Worsted Weavers (1449; refounded 1703)

=== Durham ===
Barbers and Surgeons
Butchers
Cordwainers
Curriers
Drapers
Joiners
Masons and Plumbers
Tailors

=== Exeter ===
Incorporation of Weavers, Fullers and Shearmen (1495), meets Tuckers Hall

=== Kingston-upon-Hull ===
Guild of Masters, Pilots and Seamen of Trinity House (1369)

=== Lichfield ===
Worshipful Company of Smiths (by 1601)

=== London ===
Guild of Freemen of the City of London
Guild of Young Freemen of the City of London

=== Newcastle-upon-Tyne ===
Bakers and Brewers (1342)
Barber-Surgeons (1442)
Bricklayers, Wallers and Plasterers (1454)
Butchers (1621)
Colliers, Paviors and Carriagemen (1656)
Coopers (1426)
Cordwainers (1566)
Curriers, Felt-makers and Armourers (1546)
Glovers (1436)
Goldsmiths (1536)
Society of Hostmen (1600)
House Carpenters, Millwrights and Trunkmakers (1579)
Joiners and Cabinet-makers (1589)
Society of Master Mariners (1492)
Masons (1581)
Merchant Adventurers (1215)
Milners (1578)
Plumbers and Glaziers (1536)
Ropemakers (1648)
Saddlers (1459)
Sail-makers (1663)
Scriveners (1675, refounded 1974)
Shipwrights (1636)
Skinners (1437)
Slaters and Tylers (1451)
Smiths (1436)
Tanners (1532)
Taylors (1536)
Upholsterers, Tin-plate workers and Stationers (1675)
Weavers (1527)

=== Norwich ===
Barber-surgeons (1439)
Guild of St George (1389; refounded)

=== Preston ===
Preston Guild (1179)

=== Richmond, North Yorkshire ===
Company of Fellmongers (refounded 1980)
Company of Mercers, Grocers and Haberdashers

=== Sheffield ===
Company of Cutlers in Hallamshire (1624), meets Cutlers' Hall

=== Shrewsbury ===
Drapers (1462); meets Drapers' Hall

=== Southwark ===
Guildable Manor (880AD, 1327), meets St George the Martyr, Southwark
King's Manor, Southwark (1103, 1550), meets Inner London Crown Court
Great Liberty of Southwark (1550), meets The Boot and Flogger
Tanners of Bermondsey (1703), meets St Mary Magdalen Bermondsey and The Leather Exchange

=== Worcester ===
Clothier's Guild (1590)

=== York ===
Quilters' Guild (1979) with the Quilt Collection in St Anthony's Hall, York
Gild of Freemen of the City of York (1953) meets Bedern Hall
Guild of Building (1954), meets Bedern Hall
Butchers Gild (1272), meets Jacob's Well
Company of Cordwainers (1395, refounded 1970s), meets Bedern Hall
Merchant Adventurers (1357), meets Merchant Adventurers' Hall
Company of Merchant Taylors (1386), meets Merchant Taylors' Hall
Guild of Weavers, Spinners and Dyers (1960)
Guild of Scriveners (1478, refounded 1981)
Guild of Media Arts (2015)

== Scotland ==
=== Aberdeen ===
Incorporated Trades of Aberdeen (1587)

=== Arbroath ===
Arbroath Guildry Incorporation (1725)

=== Ayr ===
Ayr Guildry (1325)

=== Brechin ===
Guildry Incorporation of Brechin (1629), meets Guildry Room of Brechin Mechanics' Institute

=== Dundee ===
Nine Incorporated Trades of Dundee

=== Edinburgh ===
Company of Merchants of the City of Edinburgh (1505), meets Merchants' Hall
Incorporated Trades of Edinburgh (1578)

=== Elgin ===
Glovers
Hammermen
Shoemakers
Squaremen
Tailors
Weavers

=== Glasgow ===
Merchants House of Glasgow (1605)
Trades House of Glasgow (1605)

=== Irvine ===
The Incorporated Trades of Irvine (1646)

=== Lanark ===
Guildry of Lanark (1658)

=== Perth ===
The Guildry Incorporation of Perth

=== Rutherglen ===
The Incorporation of Tailors of Rutherglen (1657)

=== Stirling ===
Merchant Guildry of Stirling (1226)
