= John Stanley Purvis =

The Reverend Canon John Stanley Purvis OBE FSA FRHistS
- Born: 9 May 1890; Bridlington, East Riding of Yorkshire, England
- Died: 1968 (aged 77–78)
- Education: St Catharine's College, Cambridge
- Occupations: Vicar; historian; archivist
- Employer: Borthwick Institute for Archives
- Known for: War poetry First Director of the Borthwick Institute

John Stanley Purvis OBE FSA FRHistS (9 May 1890 – 1968) was a British clergyman, archivist, poet, and artist.

== Biography ==
=== Early life ===
Purvis was born in Bridlington. As a youth Purvis was introduced to archaeology by Thomas Boynton. He had studied at St Catharine's College, Cambridge and, after graduation, Purvis joined Cranleigh School as a history teacher in September 1913.

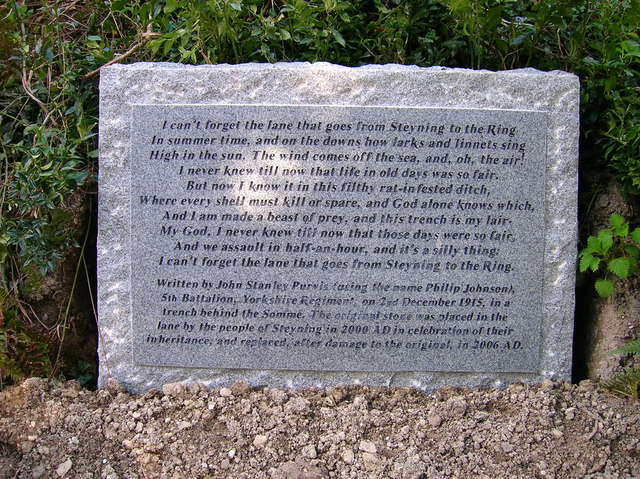
Purvis' poem "Chance Memory" carved into stone.

=== First World War ===
Purvis was commissioned in 1913 to the West Surrey Regiment, before being assigned as a Second Lieutenant to the Green Howards in March 1916. He served in this regiment in France with his father and brother. He was wounded in 1916 during the final assault on High Wood in the Battle of the Somme. Probably due to compassionate grounds, Purvis was then seconded to the Bomb and Trench Mortar School. He was promoted to Lieutenant in September 1917 and returned to his regiment in March 1918. Purvis' campaign medals are in the collection of the Green Howards Regimental Museum. They include the British War Medal 1914-1920, the Victory Medal 1914–1919, and the Defence Medal 1939–1945.

During his service Purvis was both a poet and a photographer. In July 1916 Purvis, acting unofficially, took photographs of the battlefield during the Battle of the Somme; four photographs attributed to Purvis survive in the collection of the Green Howards Regimental Museum. Using the pseudonym Philip Johnstone, Purvis wrote as a war poet and published the works 'High Wood' and 'Chance Memory'. The identification of Philip Johnstone as Purvis came in the 1970 autobiography of Ernest Raymond, who had been in correspondence with Purvis's sister after his death. Purvis had also made sketches of his wartime experiences, including one of the first times that tanks were used on a battlefield.

He remained a member of the Green Howards Old Comrades Association.

=== Clergy career ===
Immediately after the war, Purvis returned to his old job at Cranleigh School. He took holy orders in 1932 and was ordained deacon and then as a priest in 1933. He served as the assistant chaplain at Cranleigh School and curate of St Mary's, Bridlington. In 1938 he became rector of Goodmanham and, in 1941, vicar of Old Malton. In 1947 he became the vicar of St Sampson's Church, York and retained this position until 1966. In 1956 he was appointed as canon and prebendary of Strensall in York Minster.

=== Archivist and historian ===
Purvis was the first director of the Borthwick Institute for Archives in York, appointed to the role in 1953 and serving until his death in 1963. Before this (in 1939), he was an archivist for the Diocese of York and had also, in 1949, worked on plans to rehouse the diocesan archive in a new library. Together, with Oliver Sheldon, Purvis was able to use the archive as a foundation for a new historical institute, what became known as the Borthwick Institute. After his death he was succeeded as Director of the Borthwick Institute by Norah Gurney.

As a historical researcher, Purvis worked extensively on ecclesiastical subjects as well as the contents of the Borthwick's archives. He wrote the first modern script of the York Mystery Plays (published in 1951).

Purvis was elected as a fellow of the Society of Antiquaries of London in 1929. He was also a fellow of the Royal Historical Society, and a member of York Georgian Society, the Yorkshire Philosophical Society and the Yorkshire Archaeological Society. He had served as the President of the Archaeological Society from 1955. He served as a council member and a Vice-President of the York Civic Trust.

He was awarded the OBE in the 1958 Birthday Honours for services to historical scholarship.

== Select publications ==
=== Poems ===
- High Wood (published in The Nation in 1917)
- Chance Memory

=== Academic works ===
- Purvis, J. S. 1923, The Dissolution of Bridlington Priory.
- Purvis, J. S. 1925. "A figure of St. John of Bridlington in Morley Church", The Derbyshire Archaeological Journal 47, 258–262. doi:10.5284/1065823.
- Purvis, J. S. 1951. The York Cycle of Mystery Plays: A Shorter Version of the Ancient Cycle.
- Purvis, J. S. 1953. St Anthony's Hall, York. A history and architectural description.
- Purvis, J. S. 1957. The York Cycle of Mystery Plays: A Complete Version.
- Purvis, J. S. 1958. The Condition of Yorkshire Church Fabrics, 1300–1800.
- Purvis, J. S. 1967. "A contemporary carving of a mystery play performance". The Antiquaries Journal 47 (1), 111–112.
