= York Mystery Plays =

Annual series of plays in 14th–16th century York, England

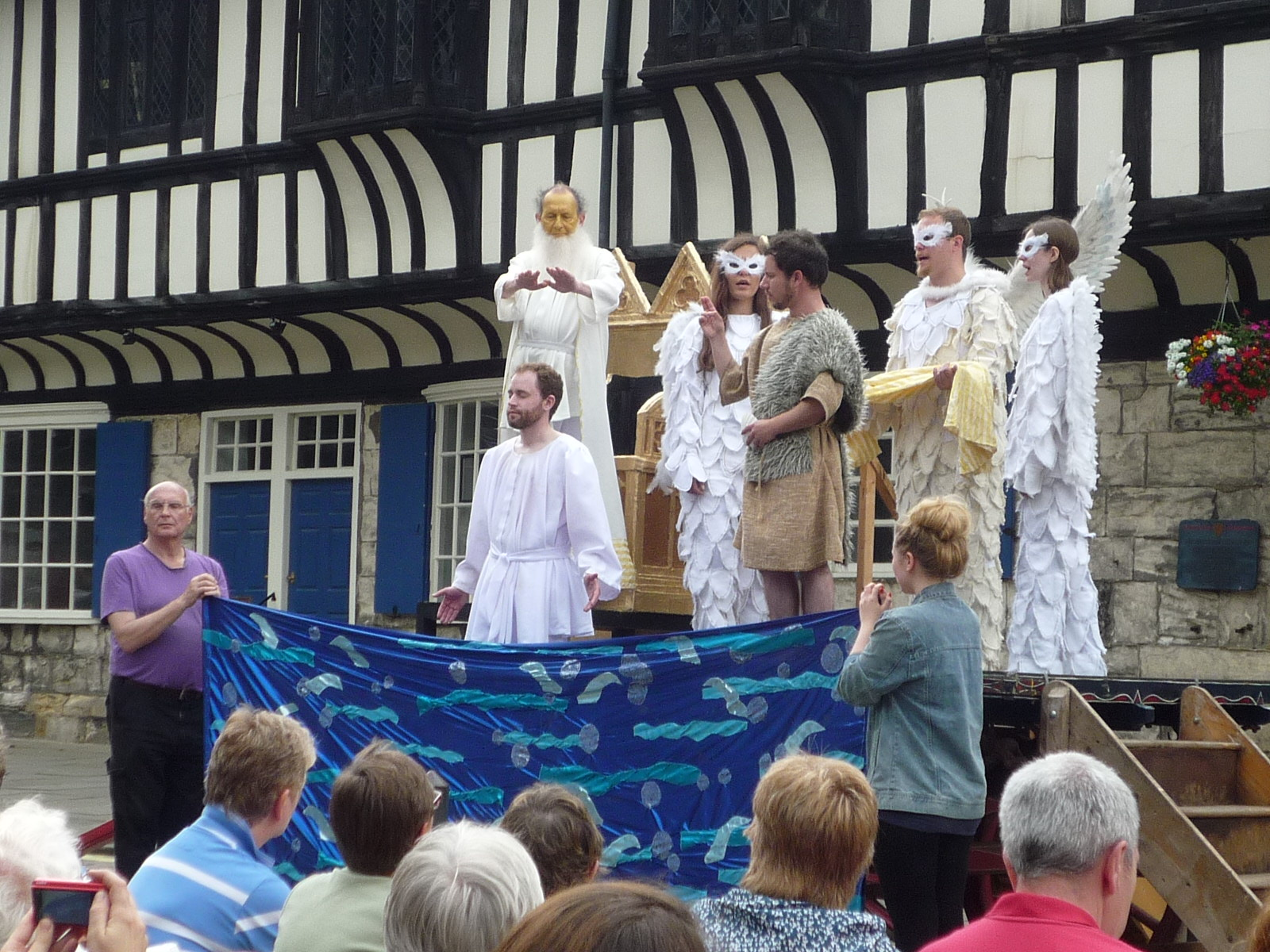
The Barbers' Play: The Baptism performed from a wagon in the street in York in 2014

The York Mystery Plays, or the York Corpus Christi Plays, are a Middle English cycle of 48 mystery plays or pageants covering sacred history from the creation to the Last Judgment. They were traditionally presented on the feast day of Corpus Christi (a movable feast on the Thursday after Trinity Sunday, between 23 May and 24 June) and were performed in the city of York, from the mid-fourteenth century until their suppression in 1569. The plays are one of four virtually complete surviving English mystery play cycles, along with the Chester Mystery Plays, the Towneley/Wakefield plays and the N-Town plays. Two long, composite, and late mystery pageants have survived from the Coventry cycle and there are records and fragments from other similar productions that took place elsewhere. A manuscript of the plays, probably dating from between 1463 and 1477, is still intact and stored at the British Library.

== Plays ==
There is no record of the first performance of the mystery plays, but they were recorded as celebrating the festival of Corpus Christi in York in 1376, by which time the use of pageant wagons had already been established. The plays were organised, financed and performed by the York Craft Guilds ("Mystery" is a play on words, representing a religious truth or rite, and its Middle English meaning of a trade or craft). The wagons were paraded through the streets of York, stopping at 12 playing stations, designated by the city banners.

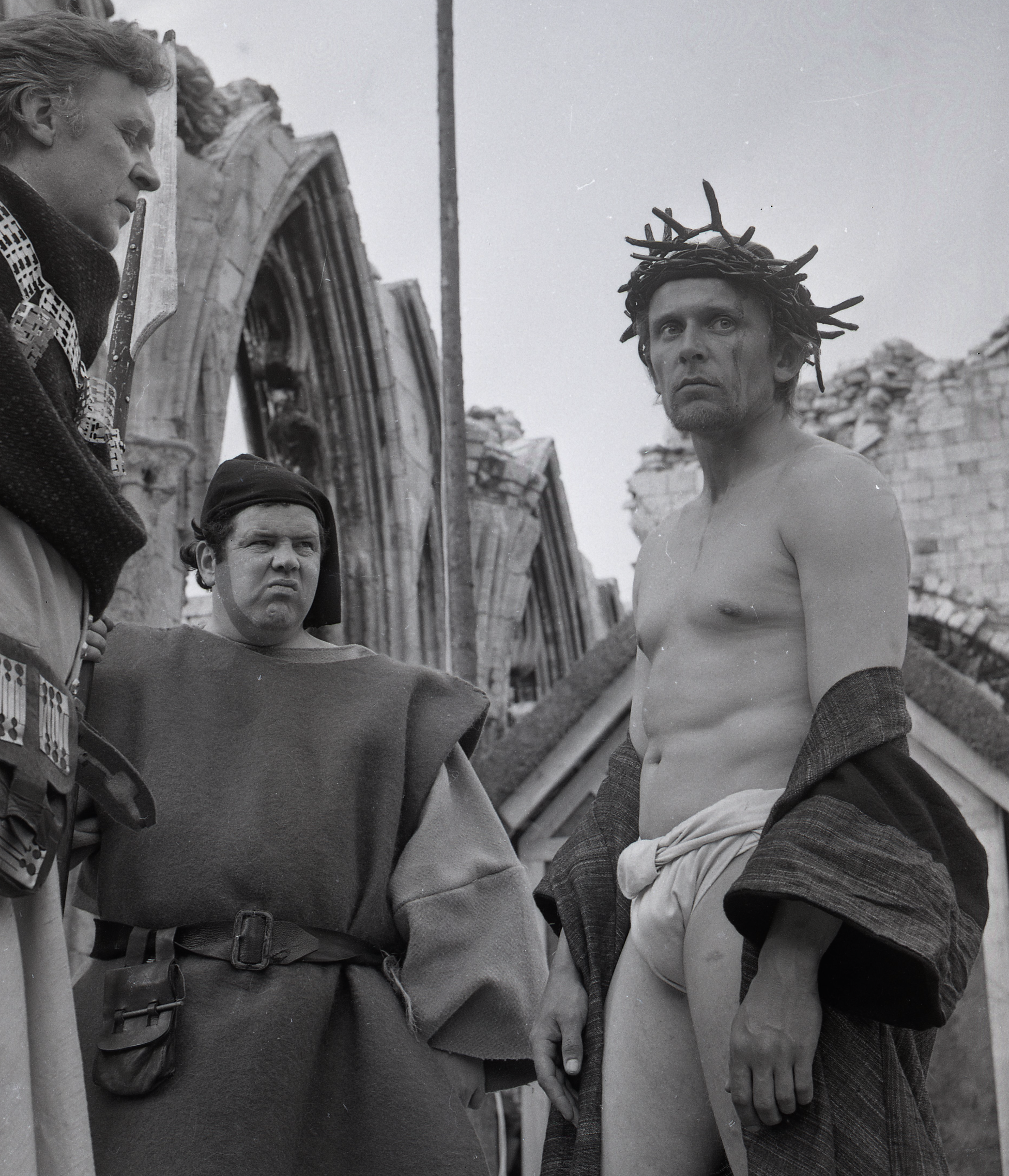
Alan Dobie as Jesus, York Mystery Plays, 1963

The cycle uses many different verse forms, most have rhyme, a regular rhythm with fairly short lines and frequent alliteration. The balance of critical opinion is in favour of several clerics being responsible for their authorship, one of whom is conventionally known as the "York Realist". It comprises 48 pageants that were originally presented on carts and wagons dressed for the occasion. In some accounts there are as many as 56 pageants. They told stories from the Old and New Testaments, from the Creation to the Last Judgement. The plays continued after the Reformation when in 1548, the feast of Corpus Christi was abolished in England. The plays were accommodated in to the new religious orthodoxy by cutting scenes honouring the Virgin, but were suppressed in 1569.

Traditionally, an individual guild took responsibility for a particular play.

1. Barkers (Tanners) – The creation, and the Fall of Lucifer
2. Plasterers – The creation – to the Fifth Day
3. Cardmakers – Creation of Adam and Eve
4. Fullers (preparers of woollen cloth) – Adam and Eve in Eden
5. Coopers (makers of wooden casks) – Fall of Man
6. Armourers – Expulsion from Eden
7. Glovers – Sacrifice of Cain and Abel
8. Shipwrights – Building of the Ark
9. Fishers and Mariners – Noah and his Wife
10. Parchmenters and Bookbinders – Abraham and Isaac
11. Hosiers – Departure of the Israelites from Egypt;Ten Plagues; Crossing the Red Sea
12. Spicers – Annunciation and Visitation
13. Pewterers and Founders – Joseph's trouble about Mary
14. Tile-thatchers – Journey to Bethlehem, the Nativity of Jesus
15. Chandlers (Candlemakers) – The Annunciation to the shepherds, the Adoration of the Shepherds
16. Masons – Coming of the Three Kings to Herod
17. Goldsmiths – Coming of the Kings: Adoration
18. Marshals (Grooms) – Flight into Egypt
19. Girdlers and Nailers – Massacre of the Innocents
20. Spurriers and Lorimers (Spurmakers and makers of horse bits and bridles) – Christ with the Doctors
21. Barbers – Baptism of Jesus
22. Smiths – Temptation of Jesus
23. Curriers (men who dress leather) – Transfiguration
24. Capmakers – Woman Taken in Adultery; Raising of Lazarus
25. Skinners – Jesus' entry into Jerusalem
26. Cutlers – The conspiracy: Pilate, Annas, Caiaphas, Bargain of Judas
27. Bakers – Last Supper
28. Cordwainers (Shoemakers) – Agony, Betrayal and Arrest
29. Bowyers and Fletchers – Denial of Peter; Jesus before Caiaphas
30. Tapiters (makers of tapestry and carpets) and Couchers – Dream of Pilate's wife; Pilate's court
31. Listers (Dyers) – Trial before Herod
32. Cooks and Water-leaders – Second Accusation before Pilate; Remorse of Judas; Purchase of the Field of Blood
33. Tilemakers – Second Trial before Pilate
34. Shearmen – Christ Led to Calvary
35. Pinners (nailers), Painters and Latoners (lattensmiths; brass workers) – Crucifixion
36. Butchers – Mortification of Christ; Burial
37. Saddlers – Harrowing of Hell
38. Carpenters – Resurrection
39. Winedrawers – Christ's Appearance to Mary Magdalene
40. Sledmen – Travellers to Emmaus
41. Hatmakers, Masons, Labourers – Purification of Mary; Simeon and Anna
42. Scriveners (Scribes) – Incredulity of Thomas
43. Tailors – Ascension
44. Potters – Descent of the Holy Spirit
45. Drapers (Dealers in cloth and dry goods) – Death of Mary
46. Weavers – Appearance of Mary to Thomas
47. Ostlers (Stablemen) – Assumption and Coronation of the Virgin
48. Mercers (Dealers in textiles) – Judgement Day

== The York Realist ==
The authorship of the plays is unknown, but analysis of the style allows scholars to recognise where authorship changes. One group of plays, concerned with the Passion, has been attributed to a writer called "The York Realist", and the name has come into general use. The eight plays concerned are

- Cutlers – Conspiracy
- Cordwainers (Shoemakers) – Agony and Betrayal
- Bowyers and Fletchers – Peter's Denial; Jesus before Caiphas
- Tapiters (Makers of tapestry and carpets) and Couchers – Dream of Pilate's Wife
- Listers (Dyers) – Trial before Herod
- Cooks and Water-leaders – Second Accusation before Pilate; Remorse of Judas; Purchase of the Field of Blood
- Tilemakers – Second Trial before Pilate
- Butchers – Mortification of Christ; Burial

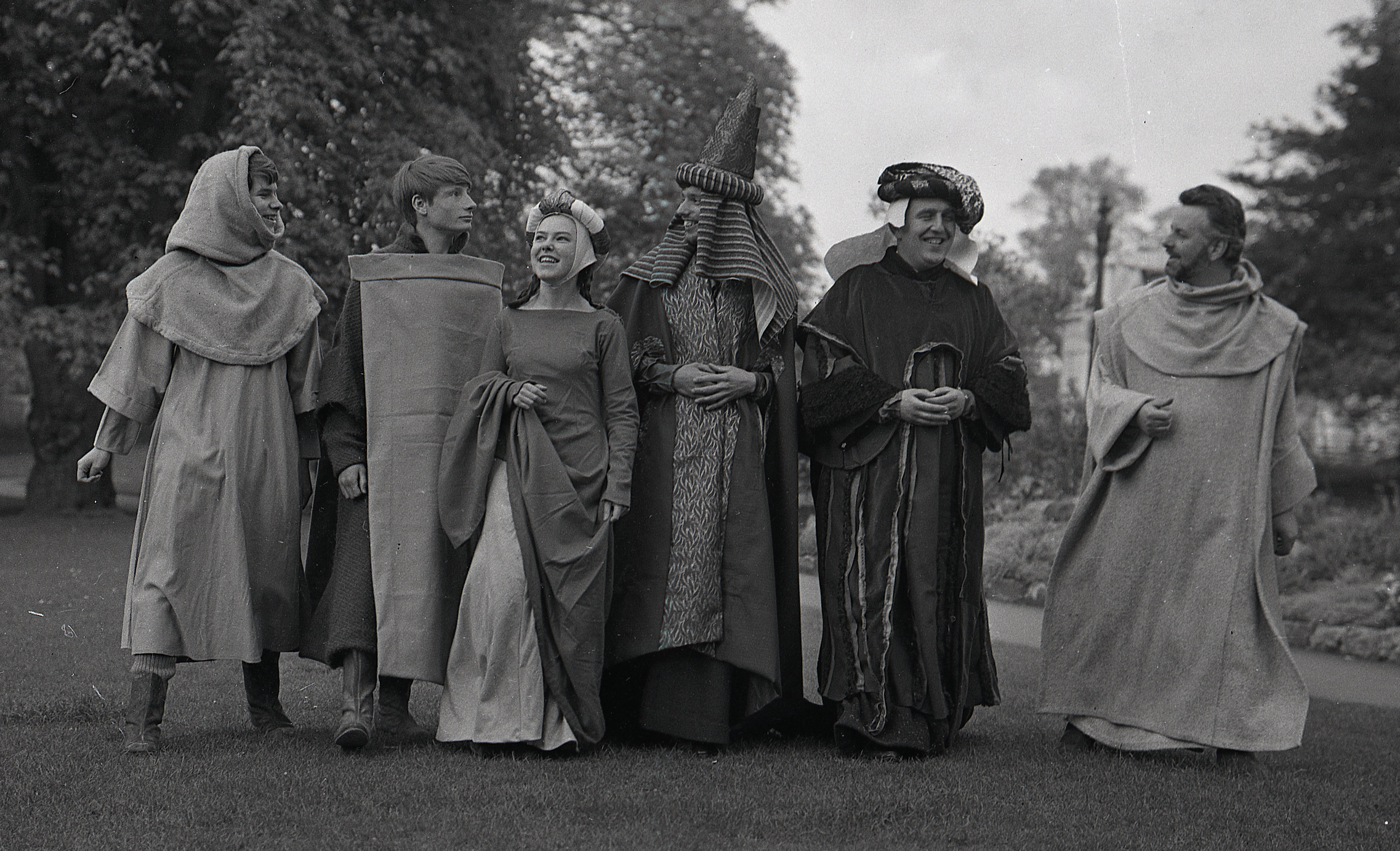
Mystery Play Actors in full costume, York, 1966

They are all written in vigorous alliterative verse as are other plays in the cycle. The distinctive feature, apart from the high quality of the writing, is the attention to incidental detail in the story-telling and in the subtle portrayal of the negative characters: Pilate, Herod, Annas and Caiaphas. Playwright Peter Gill expressed the view that "If it hadn’t been for the York Realist, Shakespeare would have been a second rate writer like Goethe".

== Modern revivals ==
After their suppression in Tudor times, the plays remained little known until Lucy Toulmin Smith obtained permission from Lord Ashburnham to study the manuscript of the plays in his possession and publish her transcription together with an introduction and short glossary in 1885.

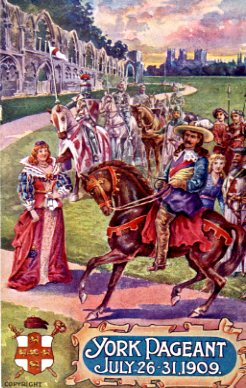
York Historic Pageant (1909)

In 1909, the York Historic Pageant included a parade of guild banners accompanying a wagon representing the Nativity through the streets. In December the same year a selection of six plays was performed as a fund-raising venture for St Olave's Church, York. The play cycle was revived on a much larger scale in 1951 in the York Festival of the Arts, part of the Festival of Britain celebrations. It was performed on a fixed stage in the ruins of St Mary's Abbey in the Museum Gardens and directed by E. Martin Browne. The music, written for the occasion by James Brown, was directed by Allan Wicks. The part of Jesus was played by Joseph O'Conor, (although he was not named in the programme for fear of backlash) and other roles were taken by amateurs. As the York Mystery Plays website notes:

A prohibition on the representation of the deity - God or Christ - still existed in England, so the name of the professional actor hired to play Jesus for the 1951 production was kept a secret. And the Dean of York still maintained a ban on the representation of the giving of the Sacrament of the Last Supper.

In the interests of comprehensibility, the text was abbreviated and modernised by Canon Purvis who went on to lead the Borthwick Institute at the University of York, and produced a modernisation of the complete text. Following the success of the 1951 production, said to be "the most widely applauded festival event in the country, with over 26,000 people witnessing the Plays", selections from the cycle were staged in the same location at three-year intervals, lengthening to four-year intervals, until 1988. They have aroused academic interest and publications. Usually directed by a professional and with a professional actor playing Jesus, the rest of the cast were local amateurs. Ian McShane played Lucifer/Satan in 1963. Some amateur actors such as Judi Dench became professionals. Directors included E. Martin Browne again (1954, 1957, 1966), David Giles (1960), William Gaskill (1963), Edward Taylor (1969, 1973), Jane Howell (1976), Patrick Garland (1980), Toby Robertson (1984) and Steven Pimlott (1988). The role of Jesus was played a second time by Joseph O'Conor (1954), then by Brian Spink (1957), Tom Criddle, (1960), Alan Dobie (1963), John Westbrook (1966), John Stuart Anderson (1973), local York man David Bradley (1976), Christopher Timothy (1980), Simon Ward (1984) and Victor Banerjee (1988).

Meanwhile, 1975 saw the Graduate Centre for Medieval Studies at the University of Leeds co-ordinating the staging of 42 pageants on the Leeds University campus.

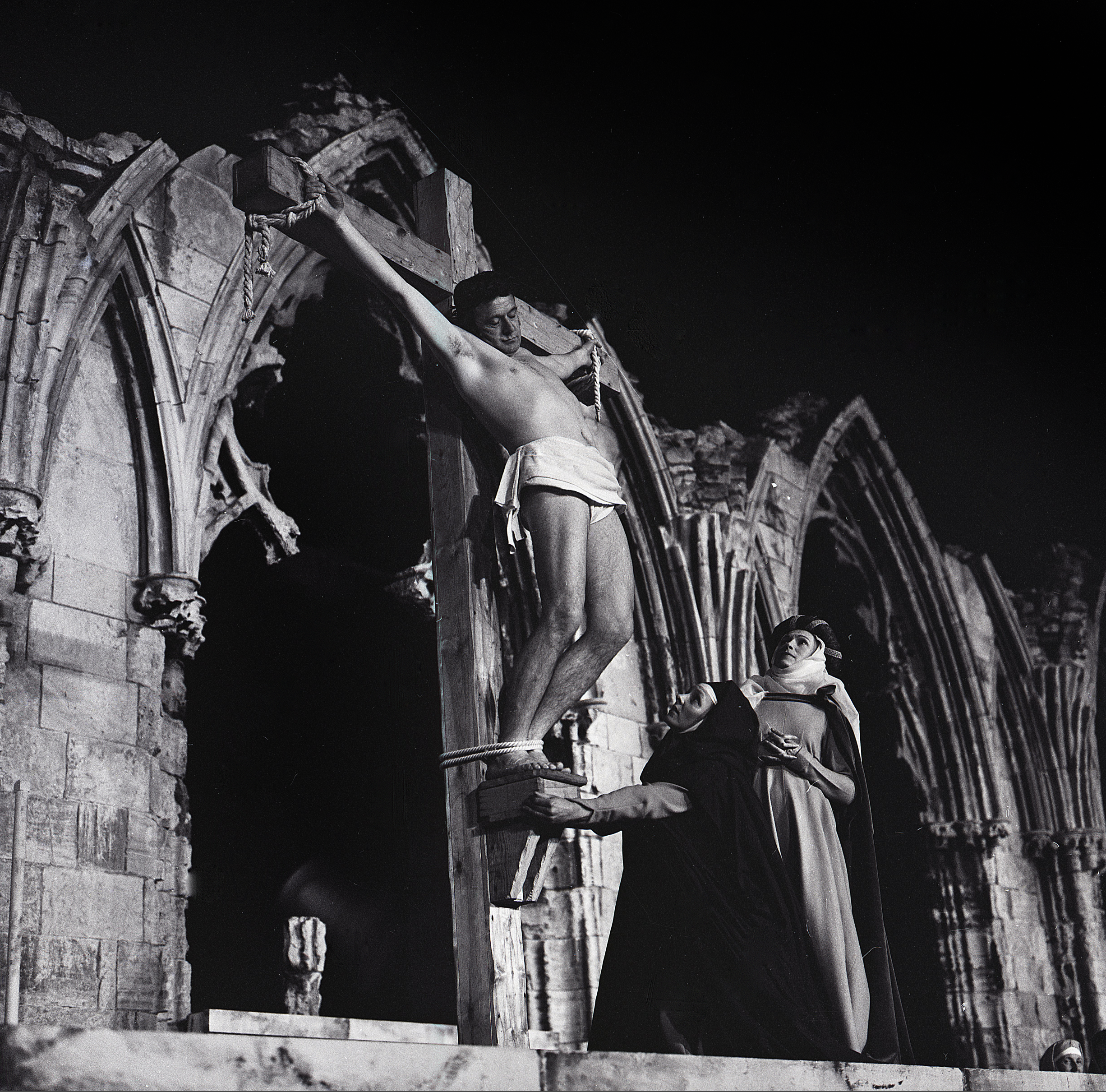
Experienced actor as Christ, York Mystery Plays, 1969

In 1992, the York production was moved in a modern production to the York Theatre Royal, with Robson Green playing Christ and a script adapted by Liz Lochhead. The 1996 production in the same place was all-amateur, with the part of Jesus played by local solicitor Rory Mulvihill, and the script shortened by Lochhead. For 2000, the interest of the Dean of York, Very Rev Raymond Furnell, led him to offer the use of York Minster for the most ambitious production so far.

=== York Millennium Mystery Plays ===
In 2000 a large-scale performance was staged in York Minster, as The York Millennium Mystery Plays, directed by Gregory Doran, with a script adapted by Mike Poulton. With Ray Stevenson in the role of Christ and Rory Mulvihill (Jesus in 1996) as Satan, the production was the most expensive and wide-reaching project in the history of the plays' modern revival. The first half began in heaven with the story of the fall of Lucifer, followed by the creation of the world, the fall of Adam and Eve, Noah's Ark (with impressive and memorable representations of the animals and the flood) and the story of Abraham and Isaac. From the New Testament there came the annunciation and nativity of Jesus, the massacre of the innocents, Christ's childhood, baptism, temptation and ministry, and his entrance into Jerusalem on Palm Sunday. The second half concentrated on the capture and trial of Christ, and his crucifixion, resurrection and ascension. The production ended, as is traditional, with the Last Judgement.

The production ran for a month, with a total audience of 28,000. Aside from the professional director and actor, Ray Stevenson, the cast was made up of amateurs, mainly from the York area. More than fifty children also took part. Original music was written for the production by local composer Richard Shephard.

=== 2012 production ===
For 2012 the Mystery plays returned to the Museum Gardens, their home until 1988. The script was adapted by Mike Kenny and direction was by Damian Cruden of York Theatre Royal and Paul Burbridge of Riding Lights Theatre Company. The show involved more than 1,000 local volunteers working alongside theatre professionals in all areas of the production, including 500 amateur actors organised into two casts who shared the 30-performance run. The combined role of Jesus and God the Father was played by Ferdinand Kingsley, and Lucifer/Satan by Graeme Hawley. Reviews for the production were generally positive, with praise for the spectacle and stage design as well as the efforts of the volunteers.

=== 2016 production ===
In 2016 the plays were performed in York Minster from 26 May, the feast of Corpus Christi, until 30 June. The director, Phillip Breen, had previously directed for the Royal Shakespeare Company. The production featured a large step set by designers Max Jones and Ruth Hall, that was dissected by a thin gauze that reached to the vaulted ceiling, which was utilised as a projection screen by projection designer Douglas O'Connell. Writer Mike Poulton and composer Richard Shephard repeated their millennium production roles. The cast had about 150 amateur actors and the sole professional, Philip McGinley, played Jesus except for the last four performances, when, owing to his sudden illness, the role was taken by his understudy Toby Gordon who had, up to then, played Satan. This caused a cascade of understudying which was superbly handled by a committed cast. It also elevated Toby Gordon into the ‘Crew of Two’ with Rory Mulvihill as the only actors in the history of the plays to have played both Jesus and Satan.

=== 2019 ===
In December 2019, the York Mystery Plays Supporters Trust (YMPST) created A Nativity for York directed by Philip Parr, the first of what was planned to be an annual Christmas production in the city. He created a script using the original texts from a selection of the eight plays in the Nativity cycle: The Annunciation and the Visitation, Joseph’s Trouble about Mary, The Nativity, The Shepherds, Herod and The Magi, The Flight into Egypt, The Slaughter of the Innocents, and The Purification of the Virgin. These were condensed into a one-hour play. Amateur actors and musicians gave seven performances from 12 to 15 December 2019 at the Spurriergate Centre, Spurriergate, York.

=== 2021 ===
In July 2021, York Minster, the York Festival Trust and the York Mystery Plays Supporters Trust jointly produced A Resurrection for York to celebrate the easing of restrictions and a hope for a brighter future. This was an outdoor production in the Residents Gardens adjoining Dean's Park in York and followed the experiences of people following the crucifixion.

=== Waggon plays ===
An experimental production using horse-drawn brewers’ drays and market stalls, was performed around Leeds University, in 1975.

In 1994 the Leeds-based historian Jane Oakshott worked alongside the Friends of York Mystery Plays, the Centre for Medieval Studies at the University of York and the York Early Music Festival to direct the first processional performance of the plays in modern times in York. The production involved nine amateur drama groups each taking one play, and touring it to five playing stations in central York using pageant waggons.

A production in similar format in 1998 featured eleven plays, and for the first time the modern York Guilds were involved with some of the plays, either directly or as sponsors. The same year (1998) a full production of all of the plays on waggons took place at Victoria College, University of Toronto.

Following the production in York Minster in 2000, the Waggon Plays were the only regular cycle performed in the city until 2012 when the static plays were revived. The Waggon Plays also used the Museum Gardens as a performance station maintaining the link between St Mary's Abbey and the plays established in the 1950s.

For the 2002 production management transferred to a committee of the Guilds of York: the York Guild of Building, the Company of Merchant Taylors, the Company of Cordwainers, the Gild of Freemen, the Company of Butchers, the Guild of Scriveners and the Company of Merchant Adventurers. Ten plays were produced with the assistance of local drama groups.

In 2006, twelve waggons performed in the streets, in conjunction with the York Early Music Festival.

The 2010 production featured twelve waggons, performing at four stations. At the same time the only known surviving manuscript of the plays was displayed in York Art Gallery.

Two plays (Creation and Noah's Ark) were performed on waggons at two stations in the York 800 celebrations in 2012.

The performances on waggons were given again by the Guilds in 2014, continuing the established four-yearly cycle.

2018 saw the plays return to the streets of York once more, this time with a selection of 11 plays

In 2022 eight plays were performed over two Sundays with a smaller set of the plays performed in the Shambles market.

Most recently the 2026 festival saw a widening of the festival to include the plays, guided walks, art exhibitions and a pop-up shop. 11 plays were performed on Sunday 28 June and Sunday 5 July 2026 through the streets of York: starting at the Refectory, then Kings' Square, St Sampson's Square and finally in Dean's Park outside the Minster. For the first time this included a fragment of a play, "The Coronation of Mary."

=== Language in modern productions ===
Modern performances use some degree of modernisation of the text, either by a radical policy of replacing all obsolete word and phrases by modern equivalents, or at least by using modern pronunciations. An exception is the productions of the Lords of Misrule, a dramatic group composed of students and recent graduates of the Department of Medieval Studies at the University of York. Their presentations use authentic Middle English both in the words used and in their pronunciation. They have regularly contributed to one of the waggon play productions.

== Editions ==
=== The unaltered Middle English text ===
- The first publication was that of Lucy Toulmin Smith in 1885. This was republished in 1963 and again in 2007.
- A century later Richard Beadle felt the time was ripe for re-examination of the manuscript, and he published a facsimile edition.
- Beadle also published a transcription of the text with notes and glossary. This included many minor amendments to Toulmin Smith's work, but no major surprises.
- Beadle's 1982 text has been put on-line at the University of Michigan. Because this has been constrained to use a modern alphabet, the obsolete letters thorn and yogh, which are correctly reproduced in the printed version, here appear as "th" and "yo" respectively.
- More recently Beadle has revised and enhanced his work into two volumes, the first containing an introduction, the text and musical settings accompanying the plays and the second containing notes, glossary and discussion.
- Clifford Davidson of Western Michigan University edited an edition for the Medieval Institute Publications in 2011.

=== Edition in modern spelling ===
- The version of Beadle and King contains a transcription of 22 of the plays into modern spelling. This is not unambiguously a benign process; where the modernisation involves the loss of a syllable it has just been dropped, which in general damages the scansion, for example is the Middle English word "withouten", which in this edition appears as "without". The Middle English ending "-and" for the present participle has been changed to the modern equivalent "-ing", but retained where the "-and" was required for a rhyme.

=== Modernised editions ===
- The first complete full modernisation was that of John Stanley Purvis, Canon of York, in 1951.
- A more recent complete modernisation is that of Chester N. Scoville and Kimberley M. Yates, in Toronto, in 2003.

== Adaptations and related plays ==
- The Mysteries is a 1977 play by Leeds poet Tony Harrison based on the York and Wakefield Mystery Cycles.
- The York Realist, by Peter Gill, is set around a 1960s performance of the Plays.
- Anthony Minghella's Two Planks and a Passion is set around a c. 1392 performance of the plays for Richard II. A radio production (starring Bill Nighy, Julia McKenzie, Julian Fellowes and Tim McInnerny) directed by the author was re-broadcast in 2008. A production in July 2011 in York Theatre Royal used three professional lead actors - Emily Pithon, Jonathan Race and Michael Lambourne - and a large community cast
- In 2014, The Flea Theater produced The Mysteries, directed by Ed Sylvanus Iskandar, a six-hour show featuring modern adaptations of all 48 original York Mystery plays by 48 modern playwrights, including José Rivera, Qui Nguyen, Amy Freed, Nick Jones, Kimber Lee, Mallery Avidon and many more.
