= The Black Swan, York =

Listed pub in York, England

The Black Swan
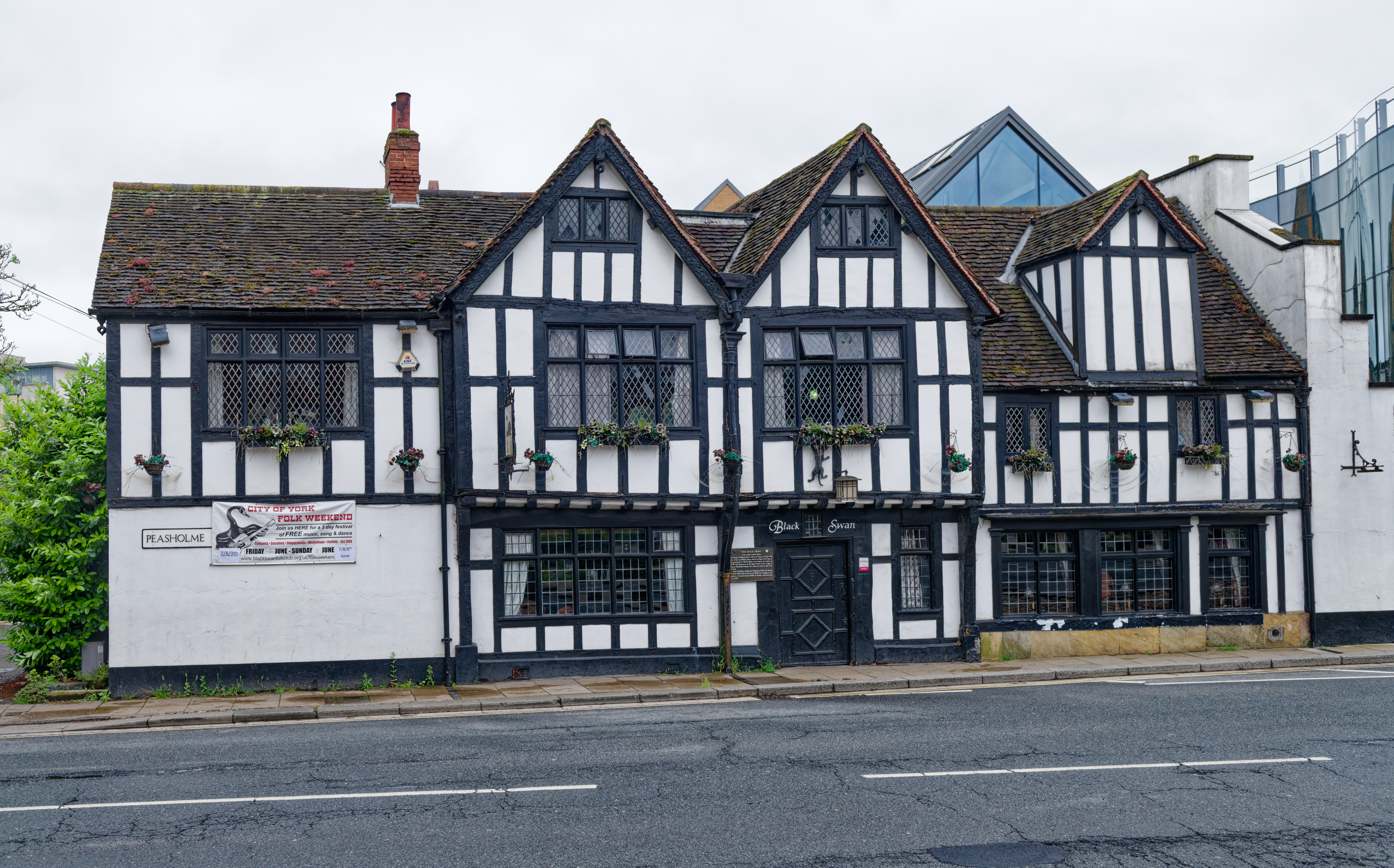
- The pub in 2024

General information
- Type: Public house
- Location: 23 Peasholme Green, York, England
- Coordinates: 53°57′36″N 1°04′32″W
- Completed: c. 1560; 466 years ago
- Owner: Stonegate

Design and construction
- Designations

Listed Building – Grade II*
- Official name: The Black Swan public house
- Designated: 14 June 1954
- Reference no.: 1256886

Website
- blackswanyork.com

The Black Swan is a public house in the city centre of York, England.

The building lies on Peasholme Green, on the site of an important medieval house which had been occupied by various Lord Mayors of York and Members of Parliament. In 1560, Martin Bowes rebuilt the property, and in 1670 Henry Thompson made substantial alterations, rebuilding parts in brick, and altering the interior. Early in the 18th century, the house was owned by Edward Thompson.

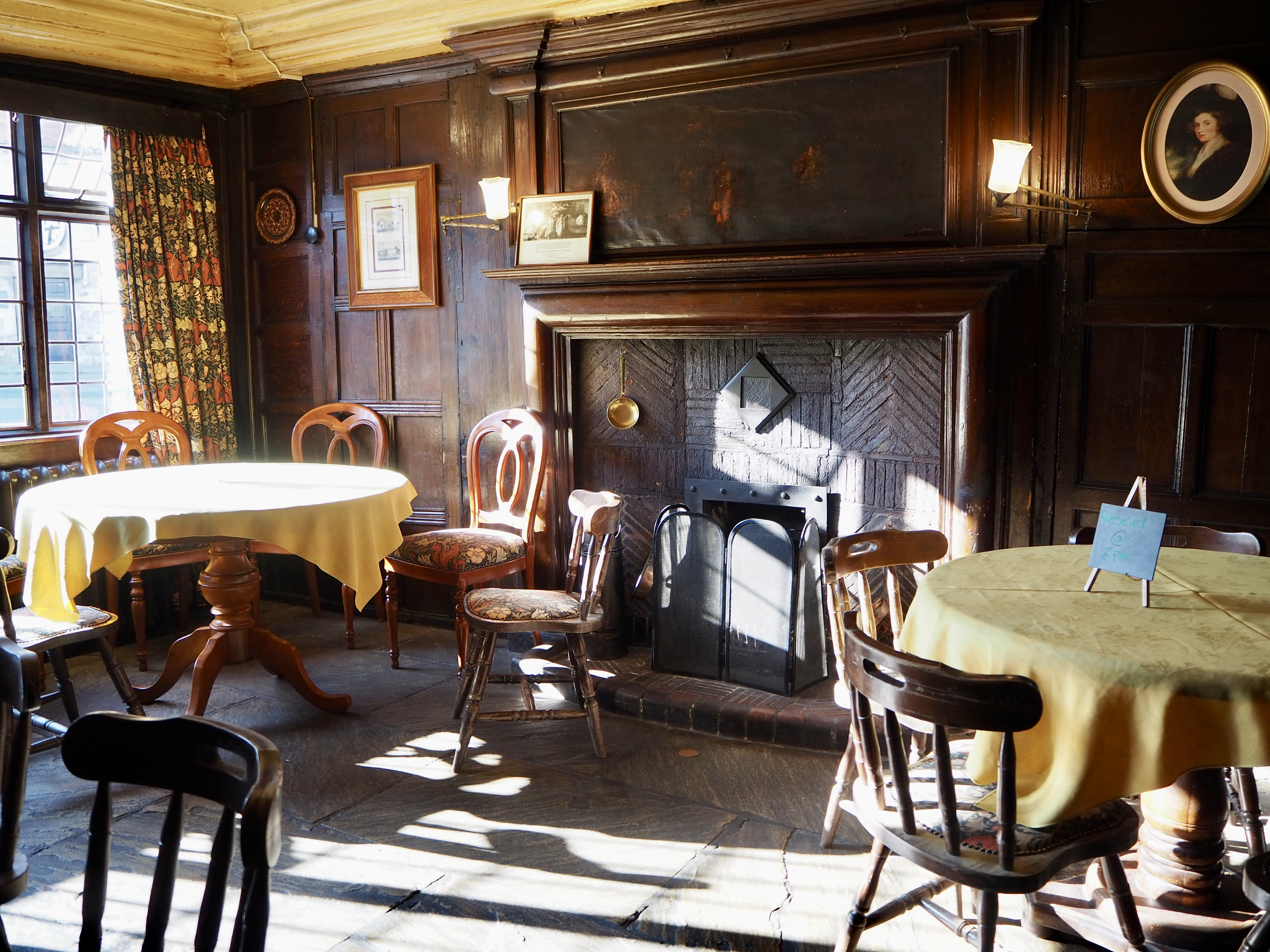
The Oak Room

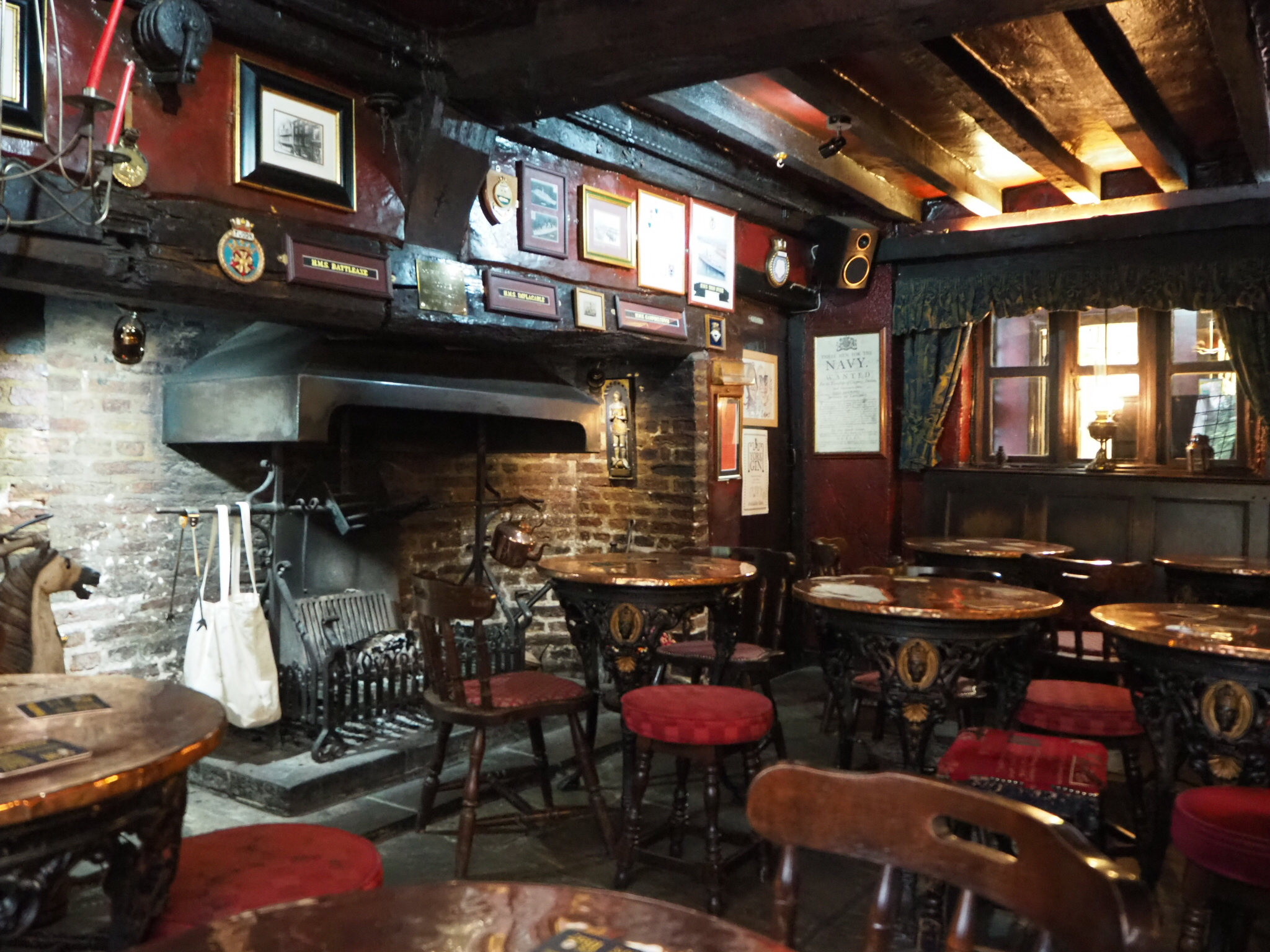
The Ingle Bar Room

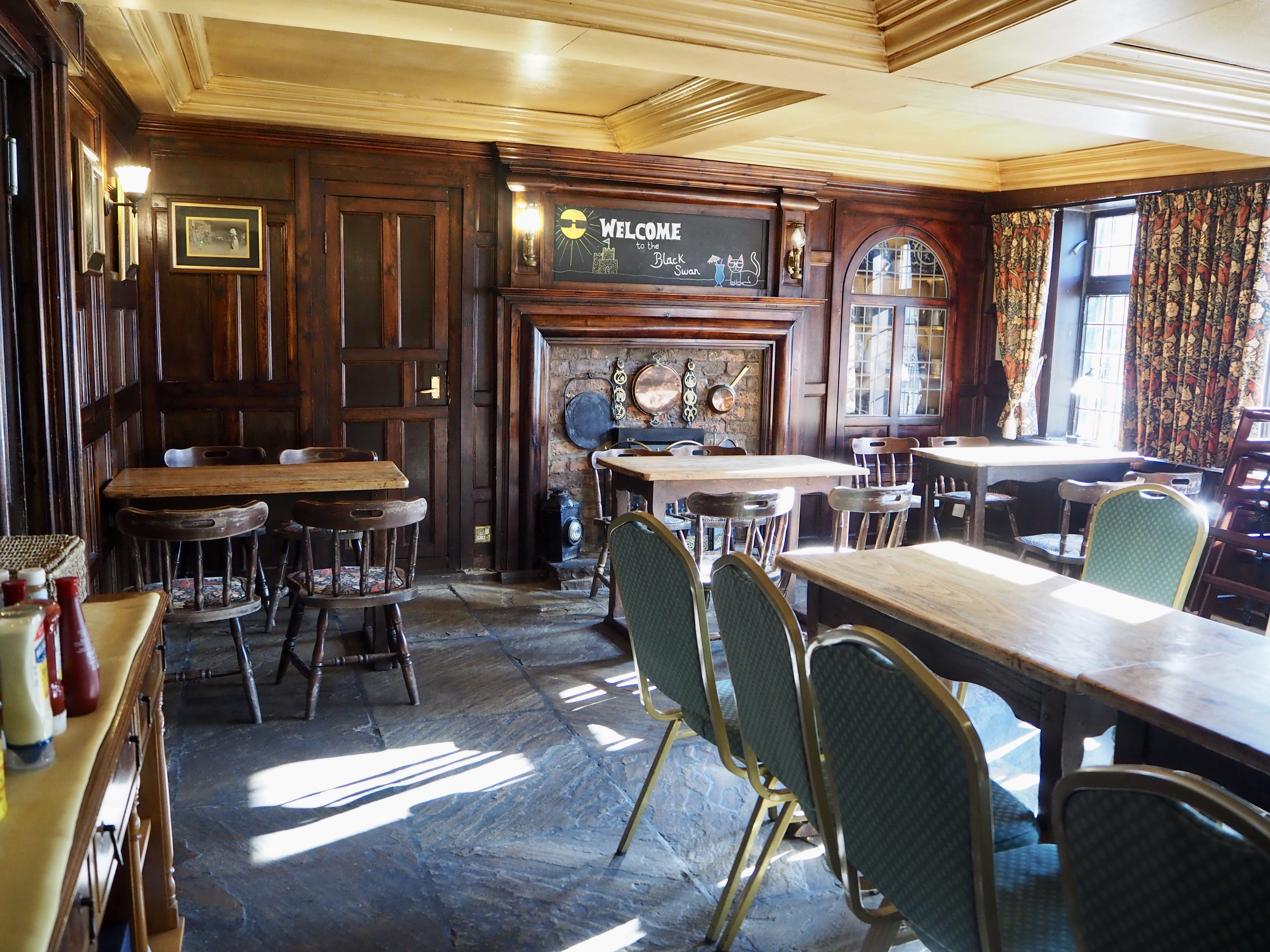
The Dining Room

In the late 18th century, the house was converted into a pub, although much of its interior survives intact from the 1670 alterations, particularly in the entrance hall, the Smoke Room, and a room upstairs with a trompe l'oeil painting. Externally, the central section of the facade is timber-framed with a jettied first floor, dating from 1560. To its right is a brick and timber extension from 1670, and to the left, an extension built in 1940, with a wing of 1670 behind.

By the 1930s, the pub was owned by the Tadcaster Tower brewery, which undertook a major renovation intended to preserve the building's historical character. The pub later came into the ownership of Bass. In 1954, it was Grade II* listed. The Black Swan is regarded by the Campaign for Real Ale (CAMRA) as having an interior of "outstanding national historic importance" and is rated three stars in its grading scheme. As of August 2025, the pub's freehold is owned by Stonegate.

One tradition claims that the Black Swan is linked to St Cuthbert's Church by an underground passage. The pub is also said to be haunted by several ghosts. Since 1978, it has hosted a folk music club, and since 2003, an annual folk festival. In 2009, it was voted Folk Club of the Year at the BBC Radio 2 Folk Awards.

== See also ==
- Grade II* listed buildings in the City of York
- Listed buildings in York (within the city walls, southern part)
