= Aldwark =

Aldwark may refer to the following places in England:

- Aldwark, Derbyshire
- Aldwark, Hambleton, North Yorkshire
- Aldwark (York), a street in North Yorkshire

== See also ==
- Aldwarke, an industrial area in South Yorkshire
