= Merchant Taylors' Hall =

Merchant Taylors' Hall may refer to:

- Merchant Taylors' Hall, London, the hall of the Worshipful Company of Merchant Taylors
- Merchant Taylors' Hall, York, the hall of the Guild of Merchant Taylors of York
