= Borthwick Institute for Archives =

University archive in York, England

Coordinates: 53.94919°N 1.05211°W

The Borthwick Institute for Archives is the specialist archive service of the University of York in York, England. It is one of the biggest archive repositories outside London. The Borthwick was founded in 1953 as The Borthwick Institute of Historical Research. It was originally based at St Anthony's Hall, a fifteenth-century guild hall on Peasholme Green, in central York. Since 2005 it has been based in a purpose-built building, situated adjacent to the JB Morrell Library on the University of York's Heslington West campus. This new building was made possible due to a grant of £4.4 million by the Heritage Lottery Fund and designed by Leach Rhodes Walker and Buro Happold.

== Archivists and directors ==
Five archivists have headed the Borthwick Institute, all serving under their predecessors. The title was changed from "Director" to "Keeper of Archives" in 2005 and was further expanded to "Keeper of Archives & Special Collections" in 2019.

- Canon John Stanley Purvis – 1953–1963
- Norah Gurney – Archivist-in-Charge 1963–1971; Director, 1971–1974
- David Smith – 1974–2000
- Chris Webb – Acting Director, 2000–2005; Keeper of Archives, 2005–2019
- Gary Brannan – 2019–present

== Archives and rare books ==
=== Archives ===
- Records of the Diocese of York, including probate records and parish records for York and the surrounding area
- Non-conformist records, including Methodist, Quaker, Unitarian, and Congregational archives.
- Hospital records, with a specialisation in mental healthcare. Hospital archives include The Retreat, Clifton Hospital, Bootham Park Hospital, and Naburn Hospital.
- Business records, including the archives of the Rowntree and Terry's confectionery companies, Vickers scientific instrument makers, and Sessions of York publishers.
- Environmental records, including the archives of Yorkshire Wildlife Trust and the York and District Field Naturalists' Society
- Records of prominent Yorkshire families, including York Quaker families such as Rowntree and Tuke, and local gentry and aristocratic families such as the Earls of Halifax, the Yarburgh family of Heslington Hall, and the Milnes Coates family of Helperby Hall.
- Educational records, including the archive of the University of York, the records of the Quaker Mount School for girls, the York Blue Coat and Grey Coat charity schools, Ripon Grammar School, and the Yorkshire School for the Blind.
- Records relating to social welfare and reform, including the personal and professional papers of pioneering social scientist Benjamin Seebohm Rowntree, and the archives of the Joseph Rowntree Foundation, the Joseph Rowntree Housing Trust, the Joseph Rowntree Charitable Trust, and the Joseph Rowntree Reform Trust.
- Records relating to Southern Africa, based on the collections of the university's former Centre for Southern African Studies (including the paper of Michael Young).
- Music and performance records, including the archives of playwright Sir Alan Ayckbourn, screenwriters Laurence Marks and Maurice Gran, writer and stage director Julia Pascal, and actress Yvonne Mitchell.

=== Rare books ===
The University of York Library holds a range of collections of valuable books which can be viewed at the Borthwick Institute.

== See also ==
- Centre for Renaissance and Early Modern Studies
