= St Michael le Belfrey, York =

Grade I listed church in England

St Michael le Belfrey
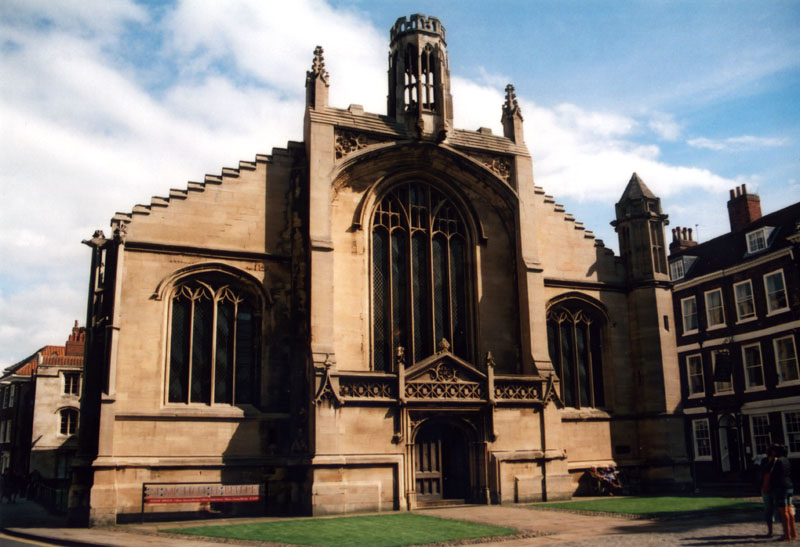
- St Michael le Belfrey, York
- St Michael le Belfrey
- 53°57′42.1″N 1°4′58″W
- OS grid reference: SE 602 521
- Location: York
- Country: England
- Denomination: Church of England
- Previous denomination: Roman Catholic (1553–1558)
- Churchmanship: Charismatic; Evangelical
- Website: belfrey.org

History
- Status: Parish church
- Dedication: St Michael

Architecture
- Functional status: Active
- Heritage designation: Grade I listed
- Designated: 14 June 1954
- Style: Gothic
- Groundbreaking: 1525
- Completed: 1537

Administration
- Province: Province of York
- Diocese: Diocese of York
- Archdeaconry: York
- Deanery: York
- Parish: St Michael le Belfrey York

St Michael le Belfrey is an Anglican church in York, England. It is situated at the junction of High Petergate and Minster Yard, directly opposite York Minster, in the centre of the city.

== History ==
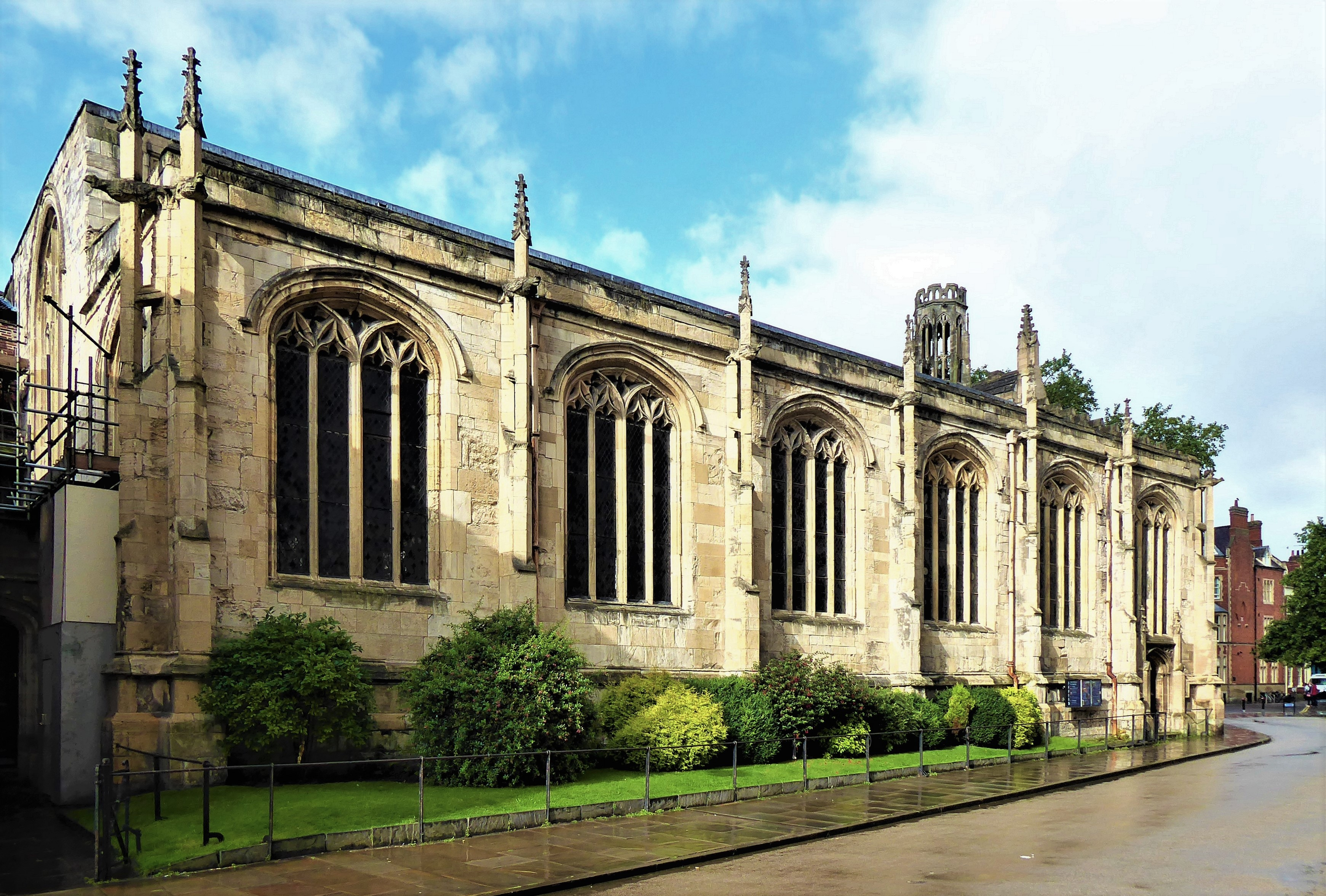
Church of St Michael le Belfrey

The present church building was built between 1525 and 1537 and replaced a church that dated back to at least 1294. The church is famous for being the place where Guy Fawkes was baptised on 16 April 1570. Fawkes later became a Roman Catholic, which led to his involvement in the failed 1605 Gunpowder Plot. The church was also the scene of the wedding of Christopher Levett of York, the English explorer, to Mercy More, daughter of the Revd Robert More of Guiseley, Yorkshire, in 1608. It is sited near to the place where the Emperor Constantine was proclaimed Roman Emperor in 306 AD. Some 14th-century stained glass was retained from the former church, which is now in the east window.

The west front and bellcote date from 1867 and were supervised by the architect George Fowler Jones. The stained glass panels on the front of the building were restored by John Knowles in the early 19th century. The interior contains an elegant reredos in the Baroque style by John Etty of 1702, with contemporary altar rails. This sits alongside other 18th-century memorials. It also contains some fine 17th-century carved benches, and a fine suite of Victorian bench seating by architect George Fowler Jones, with impressive poppy heads, and doors to the aisle seats, which are a rare survival. Also of note are two staircases at the west end that lead to the gallery with raised and fielded panelling, with Gothick balustrades, plain serpentine handrails, wreathed at foot around column newels on shaped curtail steps. These are a remarkable survival, and there are no other known surviving examples, making them of exceptional significance. The galleries themselves were designed by William Belwood c. 1785, and survive very much as designed. The seating was probably made for children of Blue Coat and Grey Coat Charity Schools in 1785, and appear to survive in their original form.

The first record of any organ in the church dates from 1687, cobbled together with the remains of an organ built by George Dallam for Durham Cathedral in 1662. This was replaced in 1885 by a brand-new 34-stop, three-manual organ by William Denman & Son of York. The organ is notable, being one of their largest instruments constructed. It is housed in the north aisle in a beautifully carved oak case designed by James Demaine, then Principal of noted York architectural practice Brierley Groom. This was spearheaded by the Rev. Edmund Carter, who had become Vicar in 1882.

=== Recent history ===
In the early 1970s the parish of St Michael le Belfrey was joined with the nearby St Cuthbert's Church, which had experienced revival in the late 1960s under the leadership of David Watson and could no longer be accommodated in the building. Growth continued in the 1970s and the church became known as a centre for charismatic renewal. It was also at this time the choir stalls and fine pulpit were removed in 1973, replaced with a George Pace designed modern pulpit and a stage for musicians and service leaders.

The Church's historic pipe organ, built in 1885 by York organ builder William Denman, and is one of the largest instruments of his career. Under the evangelical leadership, the instrument was allowed to deteriorate, and the organ's condition declined to the point that the organ fell unplayable in the mid-1990s. The organ underwent tonal changes and improvements in 1925 and 1975.

During this work, the casework was badly damaged by an attempt to strip the original dark stain of the wood, followed by an amateurish attempt to lime the casework, which damaged many of the facade pipes in the process. The organ was used extensively, alongside a range of other musical instruments, during an exciting period of renewal under the Rev. David Watson. However, later changes in the liturgical style of worship of the congregation's services led to the organ falling out of use. It was last used in 2000 before being allowed to fall completely silent. In agreement with St Lawrence's Church and the Diocese of York the organ was dismantled in 2019, restored and relocated to St Lawrence's in 2020.

== The Impact Project ==
In 2018, The Belfrey (as it is commonly known) embarked on a major repair and reordering programme that will involve significant interventions and alterations to the Grade I listed building. This will involve the introduction of a gallery within the nave of the church building and the removal of the historic Victorian seating, creating a "contemporary" aesthetic on the historic gothic style building, with modern-style reversible structures inserted within the 500-year-old structure and alongside earlier architectural features. The entrance area will house a servery, providing refreshments, while a meeting space and toilets will be provided by building partitions in the historic church. A full-immersion baptism pool, never a feature in the English Church until its introduction via the Roman Catholic Second Vatican Council, is planned, and will be inserted in the nave of the Grade I listed building, despite being out-of-character for a building of this period and importance. It will be wheelchair accessible making full immersion baptism open to many more people and a resource which can be shared with the Diocese and other Churches across the city.

It is proposed that the Victorian modified Georgian gallery, together with its exceptionally significant staircases are removed. The modern-style gallery will protrude further into the nave but the width will be contained within the nave, opening up the north and south aisles to reveal more of the spatial qualities of the interior. A significant upgrade is planned with an audio- visual installation including a retracting central screen and side screens. Equipment will be mounted on a bespoke support structure so it is more discreet than the current installation. In response to these proposals, objections have been raised by the Society for the Protection of Ancient Buildings, The Georgian Group and the Victorian Society. The historic pipe organ was removed in August 2019 when it was agreed that St Lawrence, a Victorian parish church in York wished to acquire the instrument. (The Belfrey will not replace the organ). It has undergone careful restoration by Nicholson and Co, and its relocation is particularly suited to St Lawrence's style of worship, physical space and Victorian building. St Michael le Belfrey and St Lawrence helped fundraise for the work together and are pleased that the York Organ Builder's work remains in the City. The Belfrey's project could cost in excess of £10 million with around 30% going on much needed repairs including a new roof. The Belfrey was awarded Listed Building Consent and Planning permission for the external features proposed in April 2023. A faculty application made to the Diocese of York in 2022 is currently going through the final stages for approval. The work is due to start in early 2024 and the final outcome will be determined by the Diocesan Chancellor of York.

St Michael le Belfrey has undertaken a significant period of consultation starting from Autumn 2018 and completed in April 2023, which included a specialist workshop on the gallery in November 2020. The Consultation included all the Amenity Societies listed above and other key organisations including York Minster Chapter and York Minster Fabric Advisory Committee, the Diocese of York Advisory Committee, Church Buildings Council and City of York Council. During this period, St Michael le Belfrey has taken on board comments received from all the organisations referred to above, substantially modifying and developing the Design Scheme to its current position.

The proposed re-ordering and renovation has drawn both criticism and support from the relevant heritage groups and statutory consultees. One organisation has called it one of the "most controversial for any Grade I building during the last 25 years" and another; "probably the most comprehensive and destructive scheme of reordering of a Grade I listed multi-phase church interior … ." Historic England considers the proposed work "will have a harmful impact on historic character of church, taking away layers of history that contribute to significance and introducing new elements that will change way interior is experienced". Historic England also "acknowledges changes are needed to adapt the church to current worship needs and recognises the potential this would have on strengthening the role of this place of worship for its congregation and the city." The Georgian Group strongly objects to the scheme, advising that, "given the magnitude of works proposed, the scheme would cause substantial and irreversible harm, eroding special historical and architectural significance and jeopardising status as Grade I Heritage Asset." It goes on to say that " . . . Justifications for the proposed radical alterations and the substantial harm that it would cause to be unconvincing". The Victorian Society was critical of the substantiation, saying that the Statement of Significance submitted by the church "does not adequately fulfil its brief in offering a scholarly, informed and objective analysis of significance of building and its various fixtures and fittings." They do acknowledge that "there may well be significant public benefits arising from the scheme not least the intention to inject a significant portion of the overall project funding into the fabric of the building shell."

== Present ==
The church continues to reflect the creativity that was encouraged under the David Watson era. There are usually three services held on Sunday at 9 am, 11 am and 6 pm that all reflect the style of the Belfrey but with their own unique flavour. The "Wednesday Lunchtime Service" meets at 12:30 on Wednesday lunch-times, providing workers of the city a short half-hour service mid-week, with a light lunch served afterwards.

The church maintains links with Riding Lights Theatre Company, York Schools and Youth Trust (YoYo), Alpha UK as well as numerous parachurch organisations involved in mission work both locally and internationally. The church is a member of the One Voice York, Evangelical Alliance and New Wine network of churches.

Its daughter church, G2, meets on a Sunday at The Centre at Burnholme.

The Belfrey is a large Anglican church and the present incumbent is the Reverend Andy Baker (Interim Priest in Charge). The other senior clergy are Reverend Claire Elwood (Interim Associate Minister) and Reverend James Congreve-Horn (Curate).

== See also ==
- Grade I listed buildings in the City of York
- Listed buildings in York (within the city walls, northern part)
