= Oliver Sheldon House =

Listed building in York, England

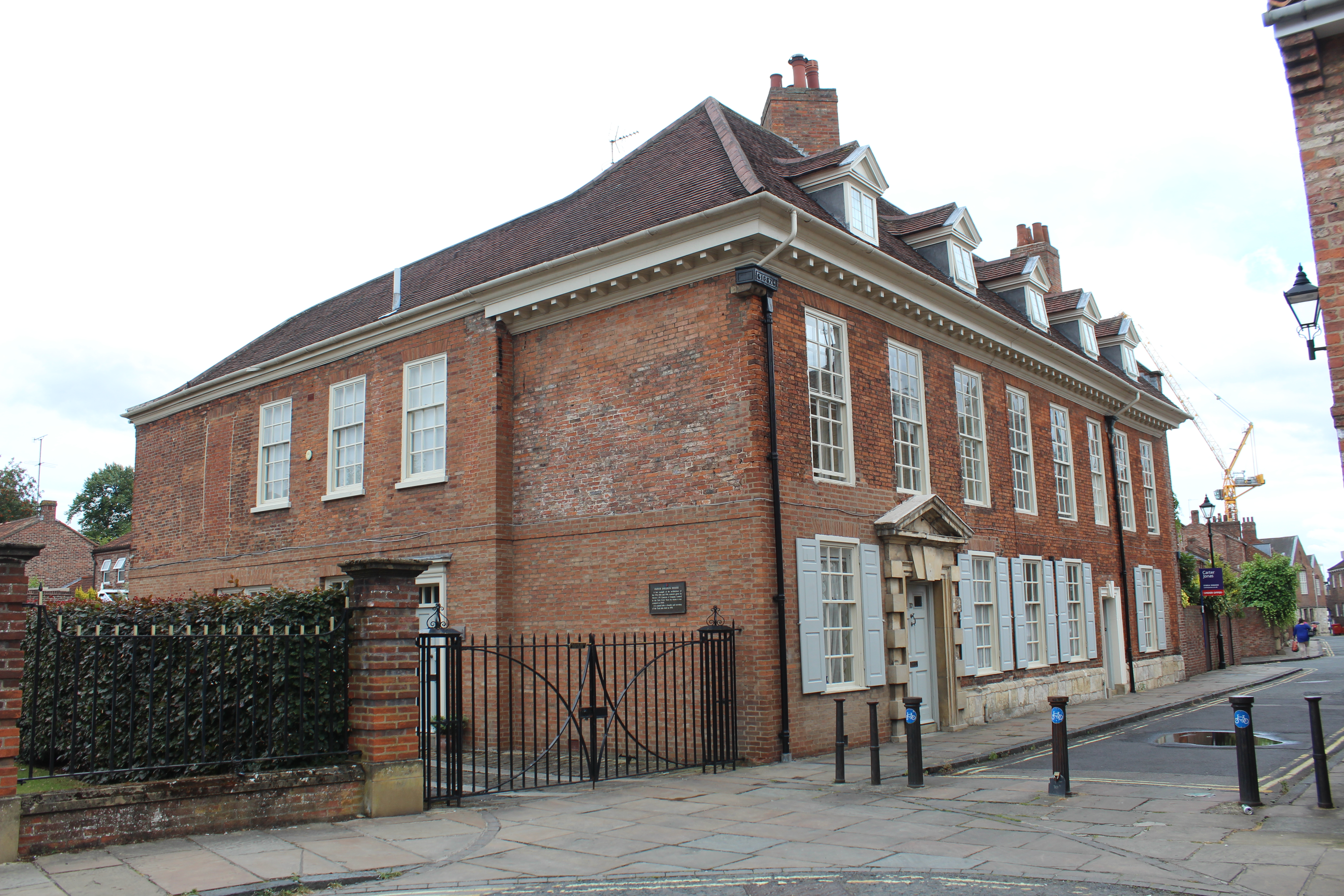
- The house in 2018
- Interactive map of the Oliver Sheldon House area

General information
- Location: Aldwark, York, England
- Coordinates: 53°57′41″N 1°04′39″W
- Completed: c. 1720
- Renovated: c. 1750 (subdivided); 1969 (converted and restored)

Technical details
- Floor count: 2 + attic

Design and construction
- Designations

Listed Building – Grade II*
- Official name: The Oliver Sheldon House
- Designated: 14 June 1954
- Reference no.: 1259568

The Oliver Sheldon House is a historic house on Aldwark, in the city centre of York, England.

The earliest surviving part of the house is some 15th-century internal framing. In the late 16th century, a block was added to the rear, the design of which is tentatively attributed by the Royal Commission on the Historical Monuments of England (RCHME) to William Garbutt. In 1703, it was purchased by Charles Redman, who soon became Lord Mayor of York. He rebuilt the exterior, in brick, in about 1720, the work being completed under his son William. He sold the house in 1748, following which it was divided, and the south-east doorway was added.

By the mid-19th century, part of the building operated as the Ebor Tavern. In 1954, the house was Grade II* listed. In 1961, the whole building was donated to the York Civic Trust, which commissioned Francis Johnson to restore it as flats, the work being completed in 1969. The trust named the property after Oliver Sheldon, who had been a leading figure in the organisation.

The building is of two storeys and an attic, with the front having eight windows and two doors. The front is of orange brick, with a stone plinth and a timber cornice. One drainhead is dated 1732. Internally, much 18th-century work survives, including the flooring in the entrance and staircase halls, the oak main staircase, the ceiling above the staircase, and the panelling of two ground floor rooms. The half-landing, in the middle of the staircase, has a wooden floor which the RCHME describe as "exceptional". One rear ground floor room has an early 17th-century ceiling, and a fireplace surround which was moved from 27 Trinity Lane in 1969.

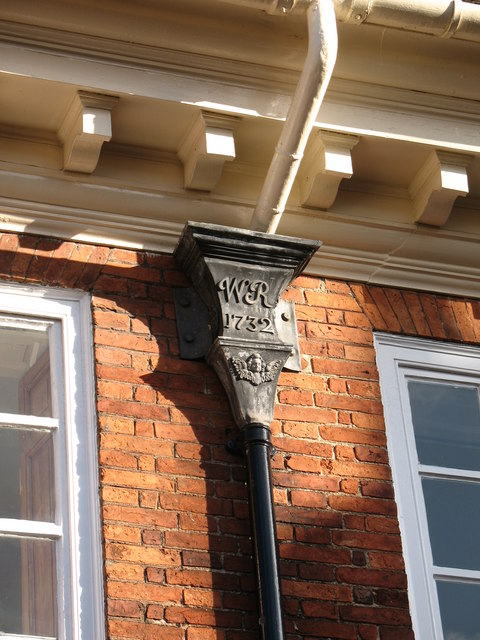
The drainhead dated 1732

== See also ==
- Grade II* listed buildings in the City of York
- Listed buildings in York (within the city walls, northern part)
