= Aldwark (York) =

Street in York, England

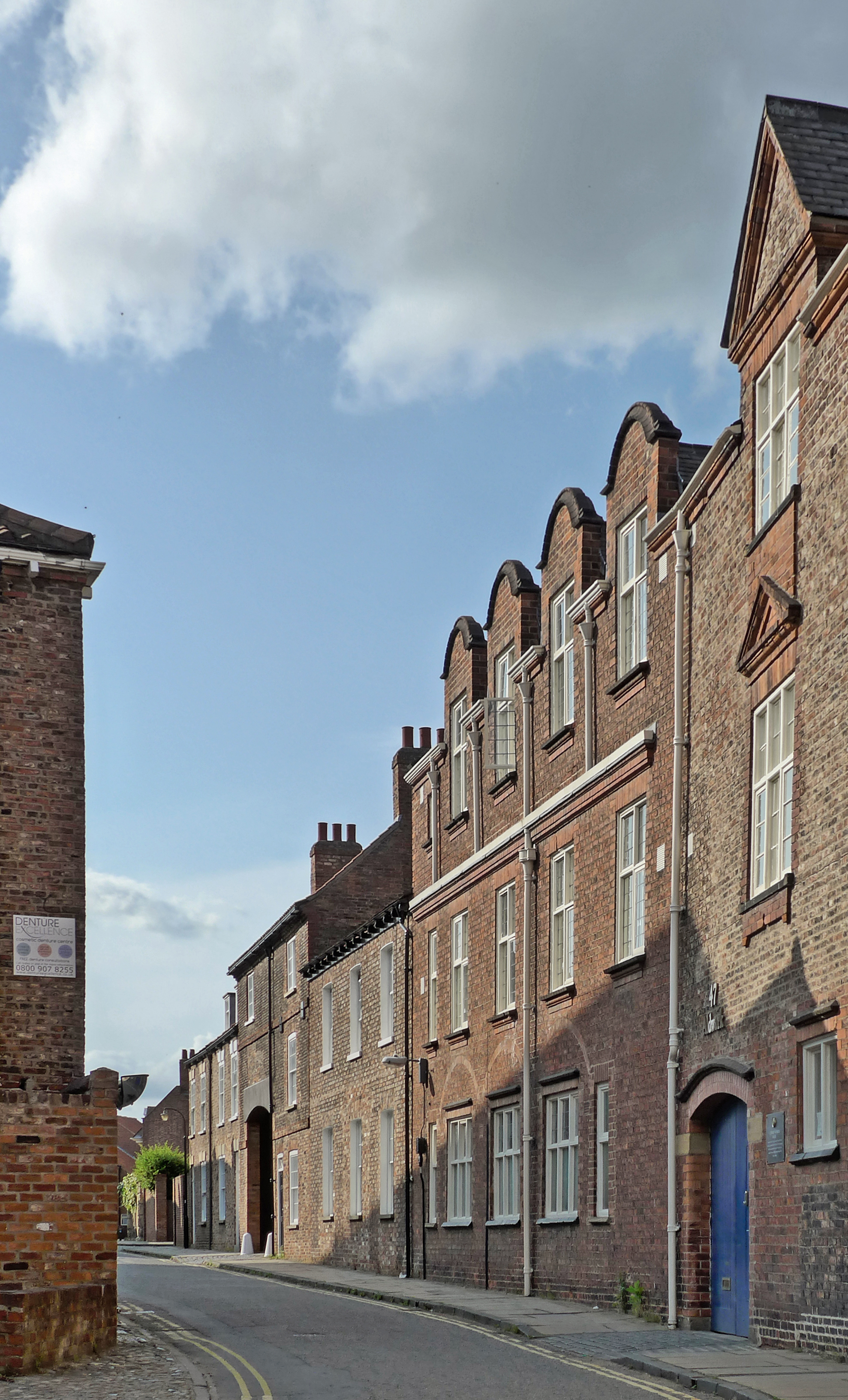
- Looking north-west along Aldwark, from near St Anthony's Hall
- Location within York
- Location: York, England
- Postal code: YO
- Coordinates: 53.9612°N 1.0774°W
- North West end: Goodramgate; Ogleforth
- Major junctions: St Andrewgate
- South East end: St Saviour's Place; Stonebow; Peaseholme Green

Aldwark is a street in the city centre of York, England.

== History ==
The street runs inside the York city walls, and its name is presumed to refer to the walls of Roman Eboracum, which followed a similar line. The street was first recorded in the 1180s. The 10th-century church of St Helen-on-the-Walls was constructed just off the street, on what became known as St Helen's Lane, but this was demolished in the 1580s.

The Merchant Taylors' Hall was built on the street in about 1415, and in the 17th and early 18th centuries, it was regarded as a desirable area, with several large houses constructed. The first Wesleyan Methodist chapel in the city was built at Nos. 40–42 in 1759, and in 1892, the city's first synagogue since the resettlement of the Jews in England opened at No. 9. However, by the 19th century, the street was run down, with many houses on the north-east side demolished for the construction of the Ebor Brewery, and various other industrial buildings being constructed.

The brewery closed in 1956, and most of the other industrial buildings were demolished in the 1970s and 1980s. Their sites have been redeveloped with modern housing from the 1970s onwards, as part of an effort to encourage more people to live in the city centre. York City Council now describe the street as "a pleasant place to live and surprisingly quiet during the day considering it is so close to the bustling city centre".

== Layout and architecture ==
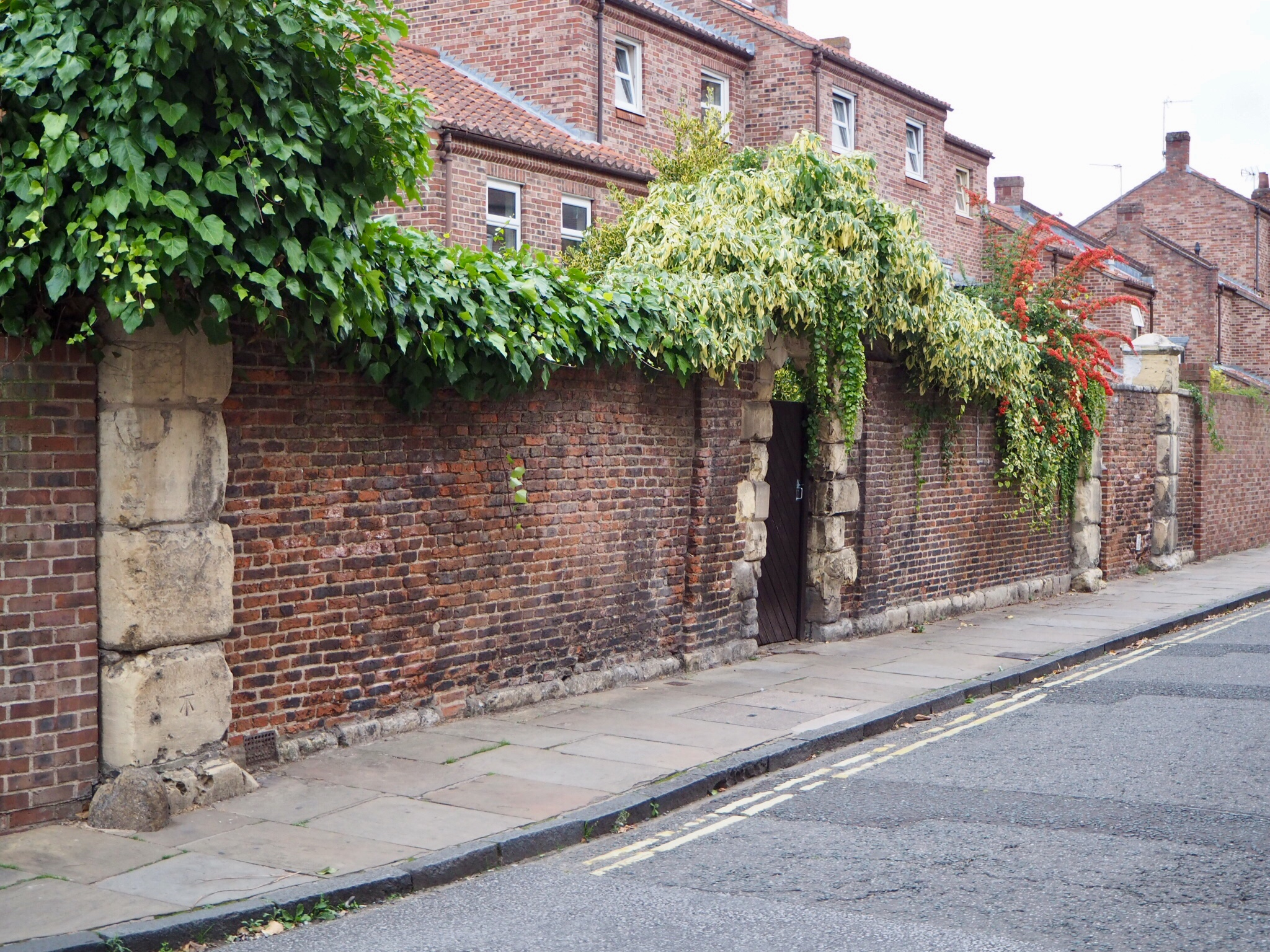
The walls of Saltmarsh House

The street runs south-east, from its junction with Goodramgate and Ogleforth, to its junction with St Saviour's Place, Stonebow, and Peasholme Green. St Andrewgate and the small Bollan Court lead off its south-west side, while the modern streets of Margaret Philipson Court, Hunt Court, and Pear Tree Court, lead off its north-east side.

Notable buildings on the north-east side include the Grade I-listed Merchant Taylor's Hall and its associated cottage, listed at Grade II; the side of St Anthony's Hall; Nos. 1–5, built in 1770; the Oliver Sheldon House at Nos. 17–19, with 15th-century origins, but largely rebuilt in 1720; the gate piers and wall of Saltmarsh House, built in around 1693, although the house itself was demolished in 1848, and Nos. 47–49, four former school ranges built between 1870 and 1901 and now used as offices.

On the south-west side, notable buildings include the former tannery at No. 36; Nos. 60–62, a former Methodist chapel built in 1759; and No. 64, which forms part of the listing with 11 St Saviour's Place.
