= St Cuthbert's Church, York =

Grade I listed church in York, England

St Cuthbert's Church, Peasholme Green, York
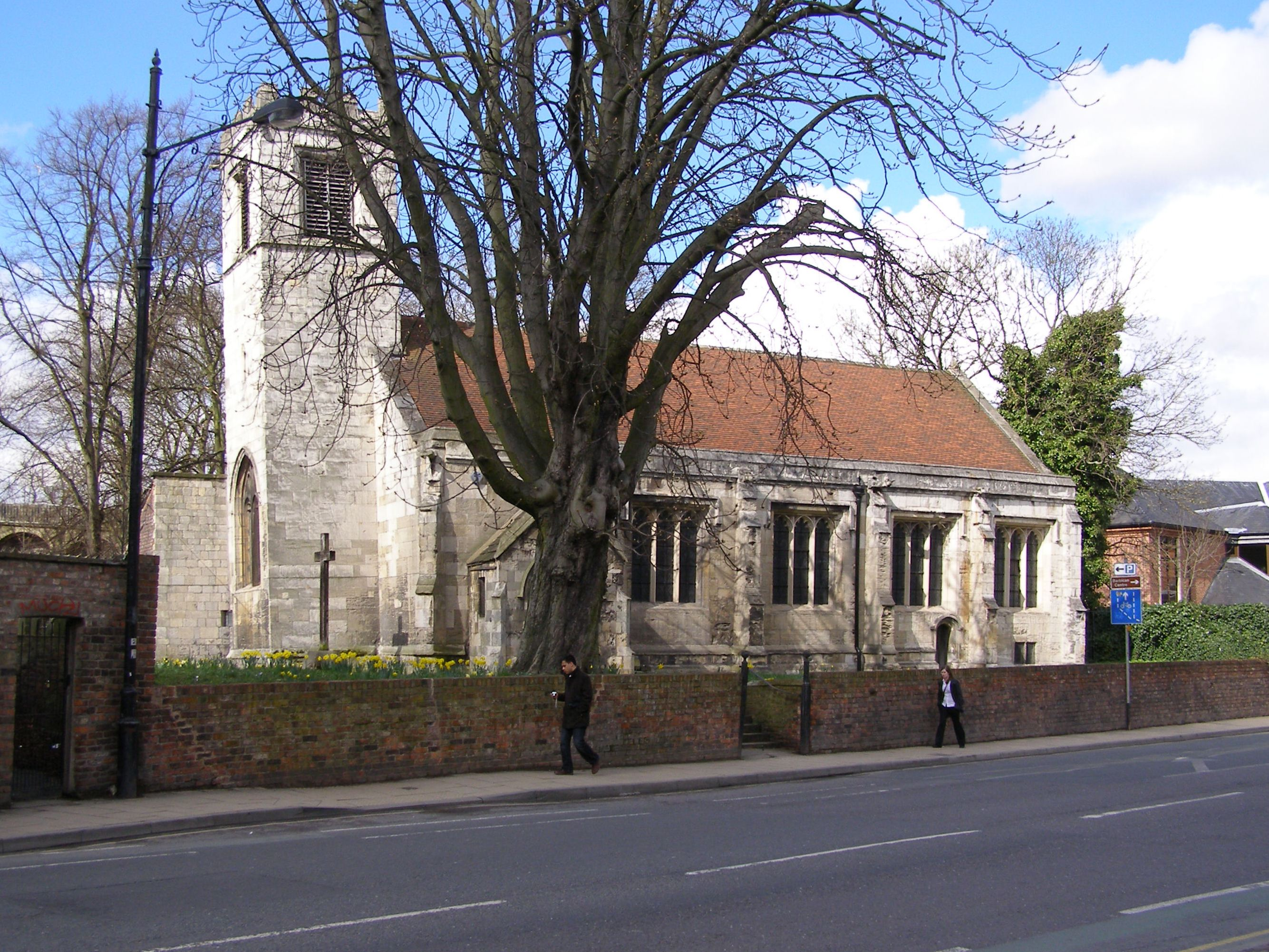
- St Cuthbert's Church, Peasholme Green, York
- St Cuthbert's Church, Peasholme Green, York
- 53°57′39.18456″N 1°4′31.6254″W
- OS grid reference: SE 60770 52033
- Location: Peasholme Green, York
- Country: England
- Denomination: Church of England
- Churchmanship: Evangelical
- Website: yhop.co.uk

History
- Status: Parish church
- Dedication: St Cuthbert

Architecture
- Functional status: Active
- Heritage designation: Grade I listed
- Designated: 14 June 1954
- Style: Gothic

St Cuthbert's Church is a Grade I listed parish church in the Church of England on Peasholme Green in York, now known as The Well Prayer House.

== History ==
The church dates from the 15th century. Around 1430 it was restored and largely rebuilt by William de Bowes MP, former Lord Mayor of York in 1417 and 1428. It was restored in 1859 when the stonework was repointed, the floor was levelled and the church was repewed. It was joined with St Michael le Belfrey and the church building was converted in 1980 into offices for that parish. It is now used as The Well Prayer House.

== Memorials ==
- Richard Lund
- Sarah Lund
- Thomas Kilby (d. 1792)
- Charles Mitley (d. 1758)
- Mary Mitley (d. 1773)
- Ann Simpson (d. 1836)

== Organ ==
The pipe organ was built by the York organbuilder William Denman in the 19th century, who also built the organ at St Michael-le-Belfrey. A specification of the organ can be found on the National Pipe Organ Register. The organ has been removed and was relocated to the Church of the Holy Spirit, Ewloe, Flintshire.

== See also ==
- Grade I listed buildings in the City of York
- Listed buildings in York (within the city walls, southern part)
