= Peasholme Green =

Street in York, England

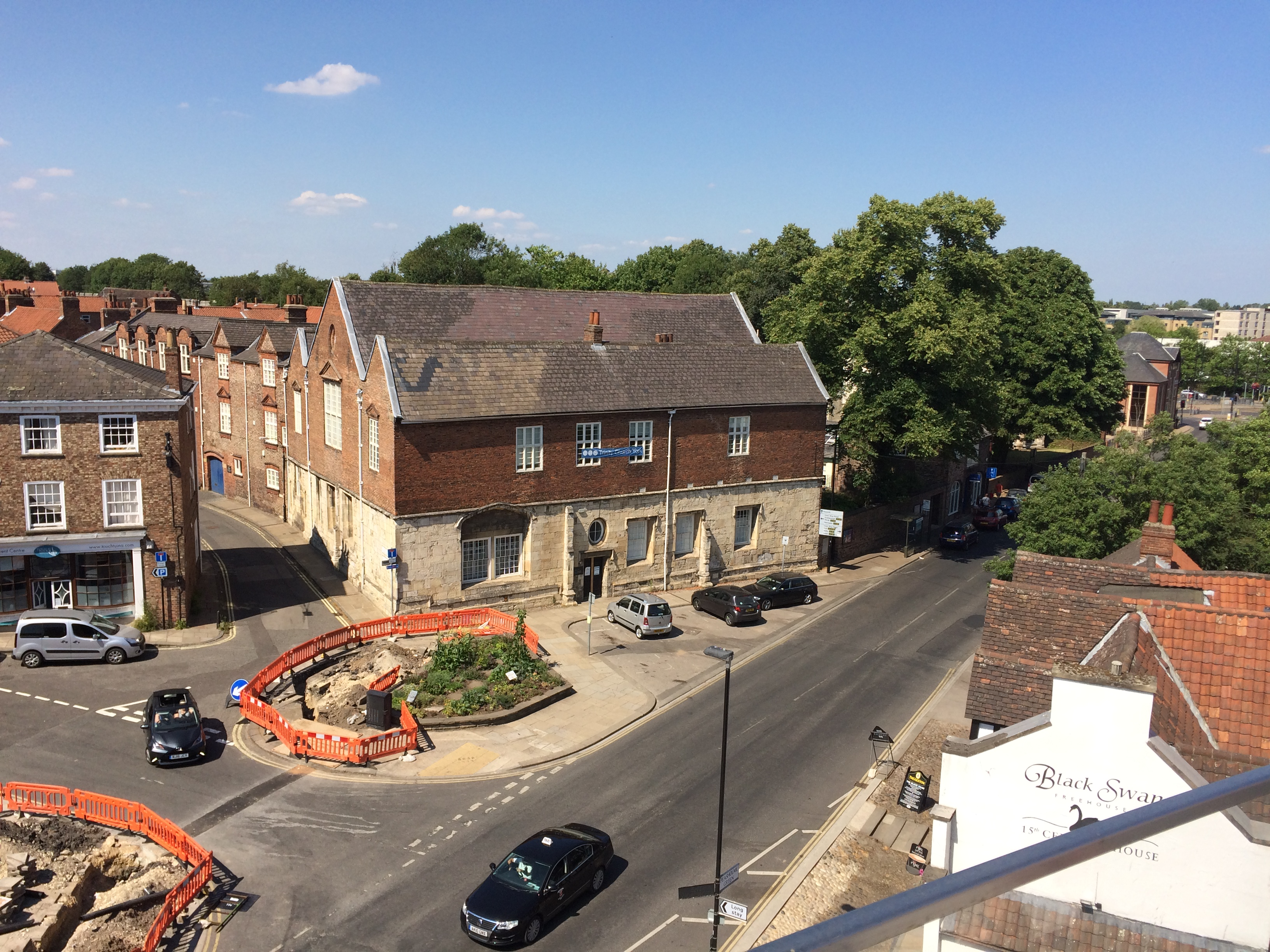
- View north-east up Peasholme Green
- Location within York
- Location: York, England
- Coordinates: 53.9609°N 1.0750°W
- North east end: Jewbury; Foss Bank; Foss Islands Road; Layerthorpe
- South west end: Stonebow; Aldwark; St Saviour's Place

Peasholme Green is a street on the eastern edge of the city centre of York, in England.

== History ==
The street was established by 1000, as part of an important route leading east out of the city. It was first recorded in 1269, the name "Peasholme" referring to a nearby meadow where peas were grown. It was known as "Peasholme Green" by 1563, by which time it had a roughly triangular shape, narrowing from south-west to north-east. The church of All Saints lay at its southern point from at least 1200 until its demolition in 1590, while a chapel dedicated to St Martin is believed to have lain on its north-western side, with an associated cemetery.

The broad south-western end of the street was a market for pigs in the 16th century, for wool fleece in the 18th century, and then as a hay market from 1827. From 1823, it also held six annual fairs for the sale of linen, yarn, hemp and flax. During this period, the road was alternatively known as "Union Street", from the Union Buildings. In 1955, Stonebow was constructed to link to the south-western end of the street, and the road layout was altered, it assuming a more uniform width. It remains an important cross-city route, with large numbers of buses.

== Layout and architecture ==
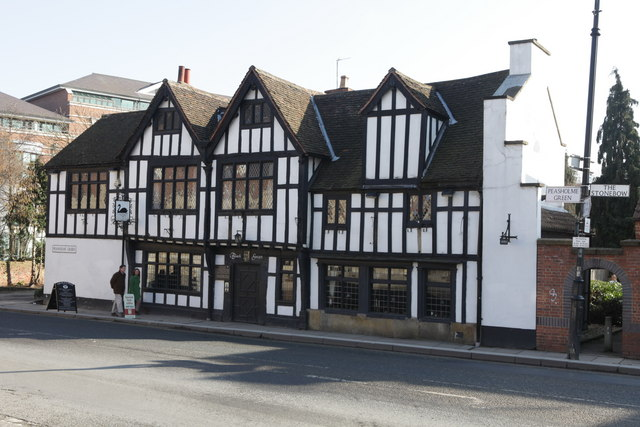
The Black Swan, with King's Pool in the background

The street runs north-east from a junction with Stonebow, Aldwark and St Saviour's Place, to the York city walls at Layerthorpe Bridge, over the River Foss. There, it meets the inner ring road at a junction with Jewbury, Foss Bank, Foss Islands Road and Layerthorpe.

Buildings on the north-west side of the street include the St Anthony's Hall, a 15th-century guildhall, with its 18th-century former coach house; and the 15th-century St Cuthbert's Church. On the south-east side lie The Black Swan pub, with 16th-century origins; and the King's Pool development, large government offices designed by Keith Mackenzie-Betty and completed in 1994.
