= Norah Gurney =

Norah Kathleen May Gurney (née Dewar) (1921 – 5 February 1974) was a British archivist and Director of the Borthwick Institute of Historical Research.

== Biography ==
Norah Dewar was born in London in 1921 and studied modern history at St Hugh's College, Oxford. During the Second World War she worked in naval intelligence. In 1942 she married 2nd lieutenant Gerald D. Gurney. In 1946, after the end of her marriage, she joined Sheffield County Library and worked in the local history and archives department. In 1956 she became assistant archivist to Canon J. S. Purvis as at the Borthwick Institute of Historical Research, eventually succeeding him as Archivist-in-Charge from 1963. She was subsequently appointed Director in 1971, a post she held until her death in 1974.

Gurney served on the Council of the British Records Association and on the British sub-committee of the Commission Internationale d’Histoire Ecclésiastique Comparée. She served on the committees of several text publication and local history societies: as treasurer of the Canterbury and York Society, as vice-president of the Surtees Society, and Chair of the Yorkshire Archaeological Society.

== Publications ==
- Gurney, Norah K. M.; Clay, Charles, eds. (1971). Fasti Parochiales: Vol. 4: Being notes on the advowsons and pre-Reformation incumbents of the parishes in the Deanery of Craven. Yorkshire Archaeological Society Record Series. Vol. 133. Wakefield: Yorkshire Archaeological Society.
- Gurney, Norah K. M. (1976). A Handlist of Parish Register Transcripts in the Borthwick Institute of Historical Research. Borthwick Texts and Calendars: Records of the Northern Province. Vol. 3. York: Borthwick Institute. ISBN 0903857065.
- Gurney, Norah K. M.; et al., eds. (1983). The Parish Registers of Easingwold, Raskelf, and Myton upon Swale, 1813–1837, with parish register transcripts for Raskelf, 1600–1746/7 and Myton upon Swale, 1598–1639/40. Publications of the Yorkshire Archaeological Society, Parish Register Section. Vol. 145. Leeds: Yorkshire Archaeological Society.
