= Oliver Sheldon =

British business director

- Born: July 13, 1894
- Died: August 7, 1951 (aged 57)
- Occupation: CEO of Rowntree Company
- Known for: Management theorist and CEO of Rowntree's
- Notable work: The Philosophy of Management (1923)

Oliver Sheldon (1894–1951) was a British management theorist and business executive who was director of the confectionery company Rowntree's in York, England. He wrote on principles of public and business administration in the 1920s.

== Early life ==
Oliver Sheldon was born on 13 July 1894. He was educated at King's College School and Merton College, Oxford. In World War I he served as an officer in the Royal Engineers, and was mentioned in despatches.

== Career ==
He joined Rowntree's in 1919 as Personal Assistant to Benjamin Seebohm Rowntree, and in 1931 was appointed to the general Board of Directors at Rowntree. At Rowntree's, Sheldon was a colleague of Lyndall Urwick and, like Urwick, was an active member of the Taylor Society.

He founded York Georgian Society in 1939 and was one of the four men who founded York Civic Trust in 1946. The University of York's Borthwick Institute for Archives cites Sheldon as its inspiration and creator in 1949 and 1950; and the Borthwick Institute was one of the founding elements of the university in 1963. The Civic Trust named Oliver Sheldon House after him.

== Management philosophy ==
Sheldon was closely involved in restructuring the management and organization of the growing confectionery company at a stage where its growth meant by necessity it had to move away from the personal, family-centred management of its founder, Joseph Rowntree, towards a more professional culture. Under the chairmanship of Joseph's son, Seebohm, the company adopted Sheldon's proposals for a more functional style of organisation, but he tempered this with a belief, shared by the Rowntree firm's senior managers, that industry existed for more than the profit of shareholders. Sheldon held that good management was about more than technique - it should be concerned with human understanding. "The leadership of men calls for patience, courage, and, above all, sympathy." Service to the community was the primary motive and fundamental basis of industry.

== Human relations approach ==
Consequently, Sheldon advocated a human relations style of management which placed the individual in a human context involving a range of emotional and psychological needs. In this, he disagreed fundamentally with contemporaries such as Frederick Taylor, who saw economic need as being the primary motivator of workers. Anticipating later writers such as Elton Mayo and Frederick Herzberg by some years, Sheldon argued that, while basic economic needs must be met, wider personal and community needs were equally important.

Industry was key to shaping society and the leaders and managers of industry consequently had to work to ethical considerations which were greater than purely financial. While stressing the need for efficiency, he saw service and democracy as complementary to this - reflecting long established Rowntree practices, introduced by Joseph and extended by Seebohm Rowntree and Oliver Sheldon, such as ensuring their workers were paid a "living wage", had decent working conditions and were consulted on and involved in decision making in the workplace. Both the firm and individual directors were closely involved in a range of community work, often motivated by their Quaker religious beliefs and/or their Liberal politics.

== Influence on Rowntree's ==
In 1904, Joseph Rowntree had given away half his personal fortune and almost two-thirds of the shares in the company to three Trusts to pursue a range of charitable, social and political work. All three continue today in the forms of the Joseph Rowntree Charitable Trust, the Joseph Rowntree Foundation (which includes the Joseph Rowntree Housing Trust) and the Joseph Rowntree Reform Trust. All are still based in York.

Although with the passage of time, the Rowntree company was to change and develop in new ways (particularly with new brands and marketing from the 1930s on), and in 1988 was controversially bought by Nestlé, it retained a tradition of good management throughout, in keeping with the philosophy of its founder and those around him. Sheldon explored this in his 1923 book, The Philosophy of Management, which demonstrated his twin concerns for sound business and ethical practice when he stated: "The cost of building the Kingdom of Heaven will not be found in the profit and loss accounts of industry, but in the record of every man's conscientious service."

== Writings ==
- The Philosophy of Management, London: Pitman, 1923. Reprinted ed., 1930.
- 'The art of management: from a British point of view', Bulletin of the Taylor Society, Vol. 8, No. 6 (December 1923)
- 'Taylor the creative leader', Bulletin of the Taylor Society, Vol. 9, No. 1, (February 1924)
- 'Policy and policy-making', Harvard Business Review, Vol. 4, No. 1 (October 1925)
- (with C. H. Northcott, J. W. Wardropper and L. Urwick) Factory Organization, London: Pitman, 1928
- 'The significance of rationalization', Harvard Business Review, Vol. 6, No. 3 (April 1928)
