= St Anthony's Hall =

Grade I listed building in York, England

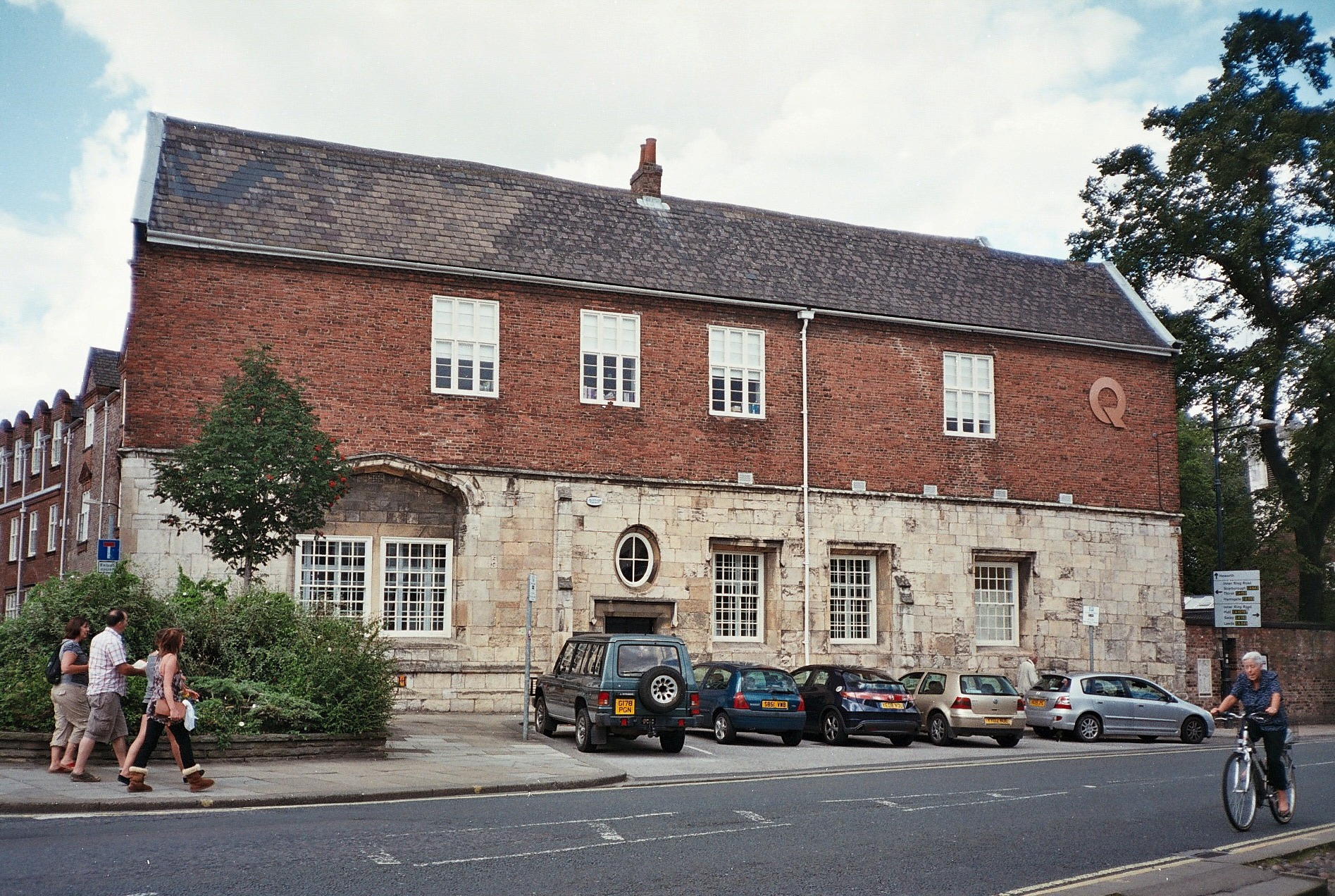
- St Anthony's Hall seen from Peasholme Green

- Location within York City Centre
- Alternative names: The Hospital of St Anthony

General information
- Type: Guildhall
- Location: Peasholme Green, York, England
- Coordinates: 53.9604°N 1.0759°W
- Year built: 1446–1453

Design and construction
- Designations

Listed Building – Grade I
- Official name: St Anthonys Hall
- Designated: 14 June 1954
- Reference no.: 1256892

Location within York

St Anthony's Hall is a former medieval guildhall and Grade I listed building on Peasholme Green in the city of York, England. It currently houses Trinity Church York and The Quilters' Guild of the British Isles. The hall was built between 1446 and 1453 on the site of a chapel of St Anthony for either the Guild of St Martin or the Guild of St Anthony (which was founded in 1446). After the decline of the Guilds, it was used between 1627 and 1705 for various purposes: as an arsenal, a military hospital and a prison. Between 1705 and 1947 it housed the York Bluecoat School, after which it was offered to the York Civic Trust. In 1953, it became the Borthwick Institute for Historical Research (now the Borthwick Institute for Archives), which moved in 2004 to a purpose-built building next to the J. B. Morrell Library on the campus of the University of York. The Quilt Museum and Gallery opened in the hall in 2008 and closed in 2015.

== History ==
St Anthony's Hall was built between 1446 and 1453 but there are several different accounts of who was responsible for founding it. The first date, 1446, is connected to a charter granted to a group of wealthy citizens of York, by Henry VI that licensed them to found a Guild of St Mary and St Martin. Most sources agree that the hall was built by this Guild of St Martin, with no mention of a Guild of St Anthony being associated with the hall at the time of its construction, and that the name of St Anthony was used for the hall because of a chapel that had formerly occupied the site. However, there is evidence for a Fraternity of St Anthony of York in the city as early 1438, so it is possible that this group and the Guild of St Martin built and shared a guildhall. It has also been argued that they were both the same guild and the men who obtained the charter were members of the St Anthony group who were unable to use their preferred name on the charter because there was already a Guild of St Anthony in London. The 1453 date relates to the year of the consecration of the chapel although the building itself was not completed until several years later.

The hall was used as the venue for feasts that took place every three years. These were repeatedly associated with claims of mismanagement by the guild that would eventually lead to its downfall. Maintenance of the hall was funded by contributions by trade and craft guilds but in the 1560s monetary concerns led to the hall becoming used as a workhouse for the poor until the passing of the Poor Relief Act 1601. Other uses for the hall in the late 16th century included being an archery practice range and as a theatre for the performance of Mystery plays. The Guild failed to control its financial problems and was dissolved in 1627.

During the reign of Charles I, the hall was used as a military storehouse and served as a hospital following the Battle of Marston Moor. In 1655 it was remodelled for use as a prison with additional internal walls and exterior brickwork being added to the building. Between 1705 and 1946 the hall also became home to the Blue Coat School, initially a charity school for forty boys which was based on the first floor, until the prison was relocated by the 1820s and the school occupied the whole building. This was not the first time the hall was a centre for education, in 1579 the chapel had been used to teach children French.

After the Bluecoat School closed, the hall was left vacant until restoration work in 1951–52 was completed and the Borthwick Institute opened in May 1953. Again the building was multi-purpose as it was also used as York's Day Continuation School and when this moved out in the late 1960s it was replaced by the York Archaeological Trust for over 20 years. Due to the limitations of the building the Borthwick Institute eventually moved to a new location in 2004 and the building was sold to the York Conservation Trust in 2006 who undertook works to preserve the building. The project cost £2.2 million and included creation of a sensory garden and underpinning the walls. It was officially reopened by the Archbishop of York, John Sentamu, in 2010. In June 2008 the Quilt Museum and Gallery opened at the hall displaying a collection of antique and modern quilts. The museum closed in October 2015 but the collection can still be seen by appointment. The hall is currently the home of Trinity Church York.

== Architecture ==
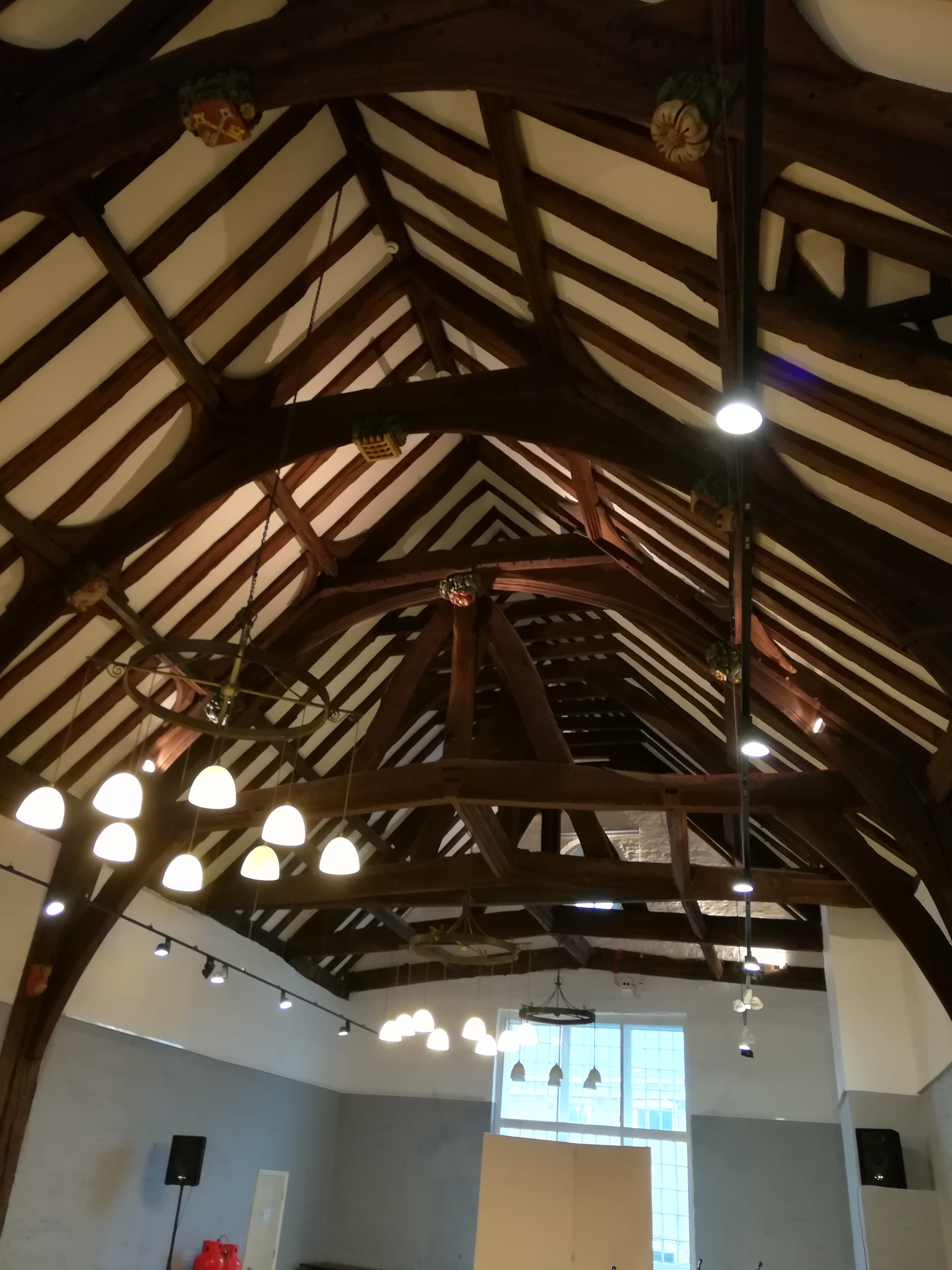
Roof of the main hall

The hall resembles the Merchant Adventurers' Hall in that it has two floors, of which the lower one consisted of a hospital and a chapel. In contrast to the Merchants' Hall, however, the walls of the lower floor are of stone (rather than brick) and the outer walls of the timber-framed upper floor were rebuilt in brick in the 17th century.

== See also ==
- Grade I listed buildings in the City of York
- Listed buildings in York (within the city walls, southern part)
