= Merchant Taylors' Hall, York =

Grade I listed building in York, England

Merchant Taylors' Hall
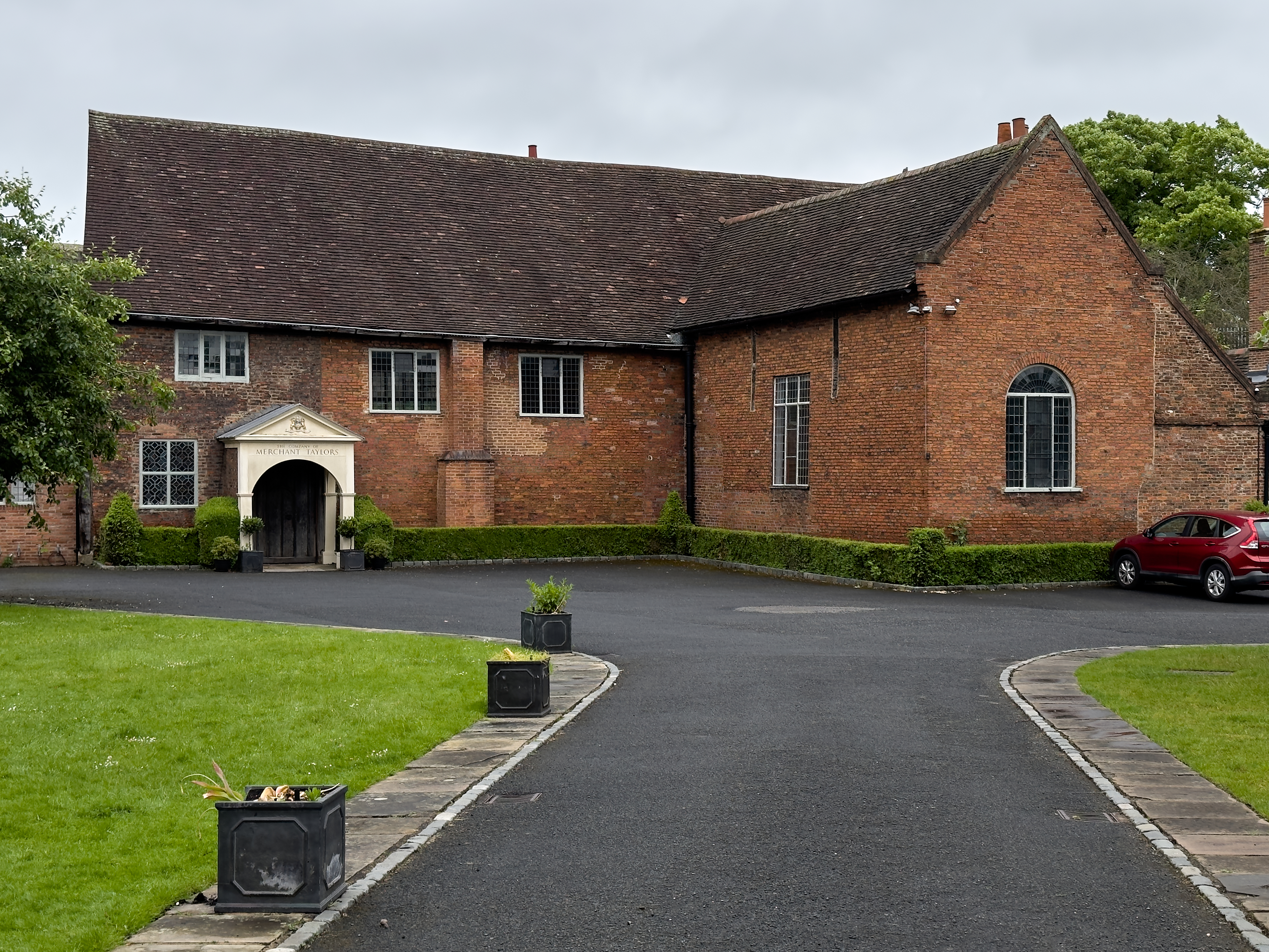
- The hall in 2024

- Location within York Central

General information
- Type: Medieval guildhall
- Location: Aldwark, York, England
- Coordinates: 53.9619°N 1.0771°W
- Year built: c. 1400
- Renovated: Late 15th century (wing added); Early 17th century (refenestrated); 1714–15 (extended and added); 20th century (extended and restored)

Website
- merchant-taylors-york.org

Listed Building – Grade I
- Official name: Merchant Taylors Hall
- Designated: 14 June 1954
- Reference no.: 1259571

Merchant Taylors' Hall is a medieval guildhall located on Aldwark in York, England. Constructed primarily in the late 14th century, it has served continuously as the headquarters of the Company of Merchant Taylors of the City of York for over 600 years.

It was designated a Grade I listed building on 14 June 1954.

== History ==
=== Medieval origins ===
The Company of Merchant Taylors in York originated as the Fraternity of St John the Baptist, founded around 1386 by local tailors and drapers. Between 1415 and 1420, the fraternity erected a timber-framed hall on land acquired off Aldwark, near the city walls.

In 1453, a small chapel dedicated to St John the Baptist was built adjacent to the main hall, serving both devotional purposes and as an almshouse for impoverished members of the guild.

=== Guild amalgamation and post-Reformation alterations ===
Following the Chantries Act 1547, the chapel was secularized and subsequently converted into a council chamber and committee room for the fraternity.

In 1662, facing shifting economic conditions, the Fraternity of Tailors formally merged with the York Guild of Drapers, consolidating their estate and financial resources. This unification provided the capital required for extensive late-17th- and 18th-century modernisations. The exterior timber framing was encased in red brick around 1700 to reflect contemporary tastes, and a new red-brick entrance wing, incorporating a Committee Room, was added between 1745 and 1747.

Despite the decline of trade guilds across England in the 19th century, the Company of Merchant Taylors retained ownership of the hall. It remains one of only seven surviving medieval guildhalls in York and is regularly used for civic functions, private events, and guild ceremonies.

In the 18th century, the building was used for banquets and entertainment, including rope dancing, tumbling and a pantomime called "The Force of Magick or The Birth of Harlequin".

On 14 June 1954, the Merchant Taylors' Hall was designated a Grade I listed building. It is still used by the Guild of Merchant Taylors of York, and is available to hire. It is a short walk to the Merchant Adventurers' Hall, the hall (originally) of the Mercers' Guild in York.

== Architecture ==
=== Main Hall ===
The core of the complex is the Great Hall, a single-storey, four-bay timber-framed hall built over a low stone plinth. Although clad externally in red brick dating from c. 1700, the medieval timber infrastructure remains fully intact within.

Dendrochronological testing on the primary oak timbers indicates a felling date range between 1385 and 1410, matching documentary records of the guild's initial land acquisition and construction period. The interior features a prominent 15th-century crown-post roof structure with heavy tie-beams, crown posts, and curved crown-struts. The hall retains 18th-century panelling, a tiled floor, and a minstrel gallery at the west end.

=== The Blue hall (also known as the Counsel House) ===
Perpendicular to the main hall is the Blue Hall (the former 15th-century chapel) more commonly referred to as the Counsel House (or sometimes the Counting House or even Small Hall). It retains its original roof timbers, though its medieval windows were replaced during 18th-century alterations. Also, it contains two stained glass windows by York glass painter Henry Gyles. The south window shows Queen Anne, and was made to commemorate her accession to the throne while the side window depicts the coat of arms of the London Company of Merchant Taylors.

The adjacent Committee Room, constructed in 1745, features high Georgian sash windows, decorative plasterwork, and early 18th-century furnishings, including original guild chests and portraiture of past Master Taylors.
