= Chapter House Street =

Street in York, England

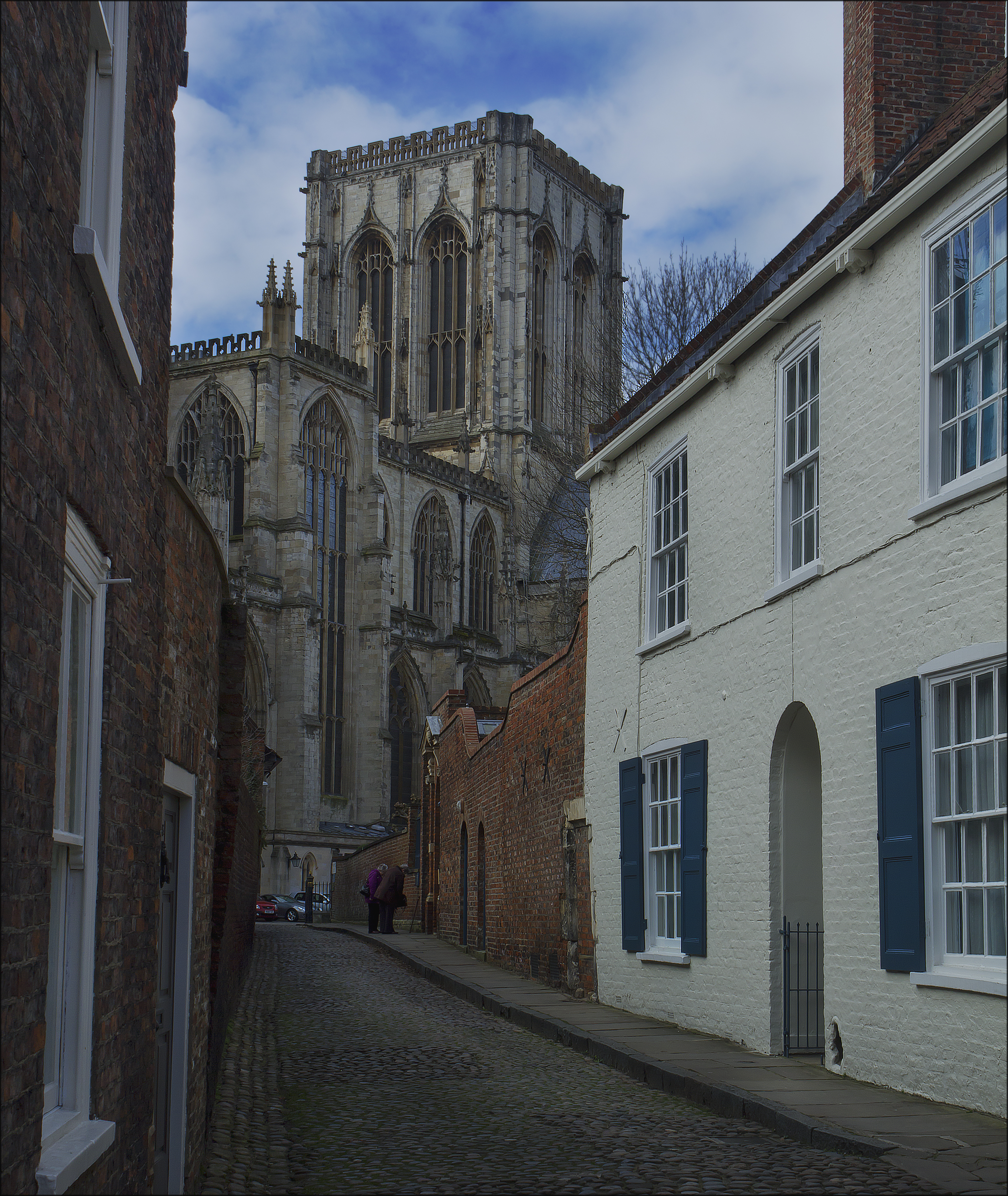
- Chapter House Street and the Minster
- Location within York
- Maintained by: City of York
- Location: York, England
- Coordinates: 53.9628°N 1.0806°W
- North: Ogleforth
- South: Minster Yard

Chapter House Street is a street in the city centre of York, England, connecting Ogleforth and Minster Yard.

== History ==
The street follows the route of the via decumana of Roman Eboracum. It is believed to have been the main route into York from the north-east until about 1330, when Monk Bar was constructed and the access through the York city walls stopped up. The road was then regarded as part of Ogleforth. It lay within the walls of the Minster Close, constructed in the 13th century.

The parsonage of St John-del-Pyke lay on the street, and after that church closed, in 1553, it became used by the incumbents of Holy Trinity, Goodramgate. The road was widened in 1825, and in 1838 the name "Chapter House Street" was first recorded.

The Royal Commission on Historic Monuments described the street as "a short cobbled lane, bounded by the walls and entrance of the Treasurer's House and small houses, and terminated visually by the Minster choir and chapter house".

== Layout and architecture ==
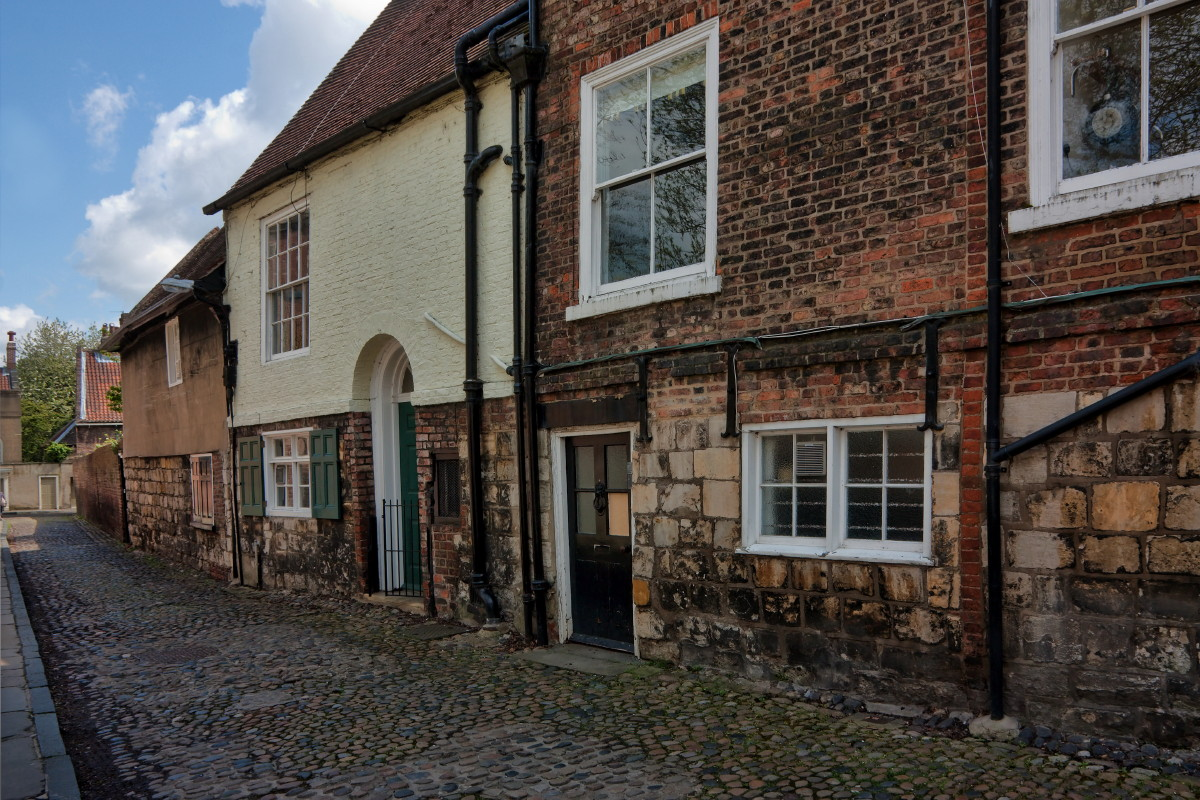
Buildings on the south-east side of Chapter House Street

The street runs north-east from the junction of Minster Yard and Minster Court, then turns sharply south-east to become Ogleforth. On its north-western side lie the side entrance of Treasurer's House, a Grade I listed building and National Trust property; Nos. 4 and 6, both built about 1820; a passageway to Grays Court, a Grade I listed hotel with 12th-century origins; and Old Rectory House at No. 8, with medieval origins but largely rebuilt in the 1730s. On the south-eastern side are the 15th-century No. 1; the late-17th-century No. 3; and No. 5, part of a 16th-century building that was rebuilt in the 18th century and is mostly on Ogleforth.
