= Old Rectory House =

Listed building in York, England

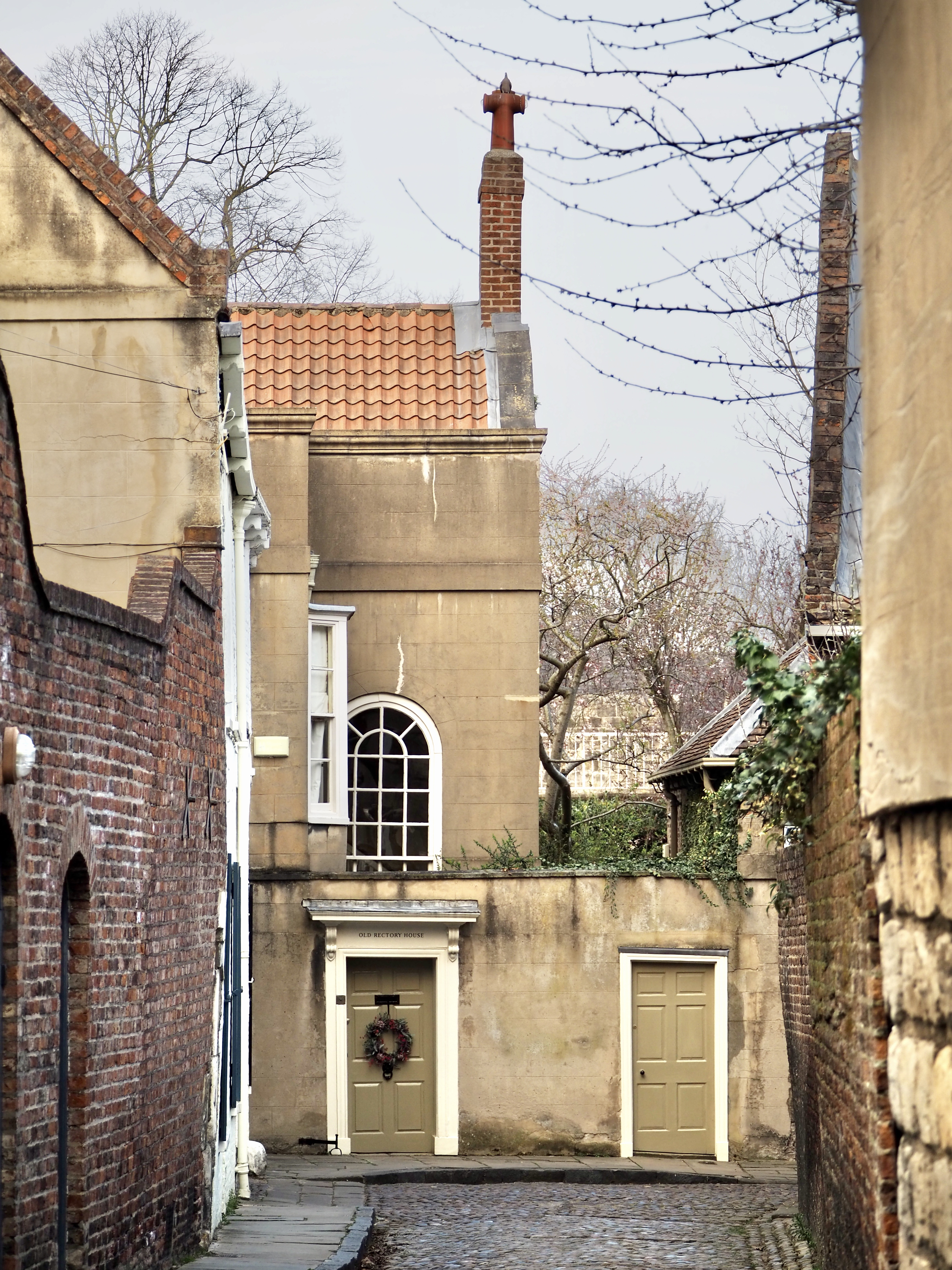
- View of the building from Chapter House Street in 2022
- Interactive map of the Old Rectory House area

General information
- Status: Private residence
- Type: Rectory (former)
- Location: Chapter House Street, York, England
- Coordinates: 53°57′47″N 1°04′48″W
- Year built: Early 18th century
- Renovated: Early 19th century (altered, extended, partly rebuilt) c. 1840 (altered)

Design and construction
- Designations

Listed Building – Grade II*
- Official name: Old Rectory House and attached wall and garage
- Designated: 14 June 1954
- Reference no.: 1259280

Old Rectory House is a Grade II* listed former rectory on the corner of Chapter House Street and Ogleforth in the city of York, England. Rebuilt in the early 18th century and altered in the 19th, it served the parish of St John del Pike, later linked with Holy Trinity on Goodramgate, until its sale in 1880. Now a private house with a garage, it retains slight traces of late‑medieval timber framing. The building was included in the Central Historic Core conservation area in 1968.

== History ==
The building stands on Chapter House Street, in a secluded corner with Ogleforth. It began as the rectory for the parish of St John del Pike, later linked with Holy Trinity on Goodramgate. Only slight traces of timber framing from the late‑medieval period survive inside, and the main structure was rebuilt in the early 18th century under the Revd. William Knight, then rector of Holy Trinity. It was further altered, enlarged and partly rebuilt in the early 19th century, with additional work carried out around 1840. It remained in clerical use until it was sold in 1880, and is now a private house with a garage.

On 14 June 1954, the Old Rectory House and its attached wall and garage was designated a Grade II* listed building, and in 1968 the site was included within the newly designated Central Historic Core conservation area.

It was reported when the property was put up for sale in 1998 that it had had only two private owners, the most recent being Dr Arthur Bowen, a psychiatrist who formerly headed Bootham Park Hospital.

== Architecture ==
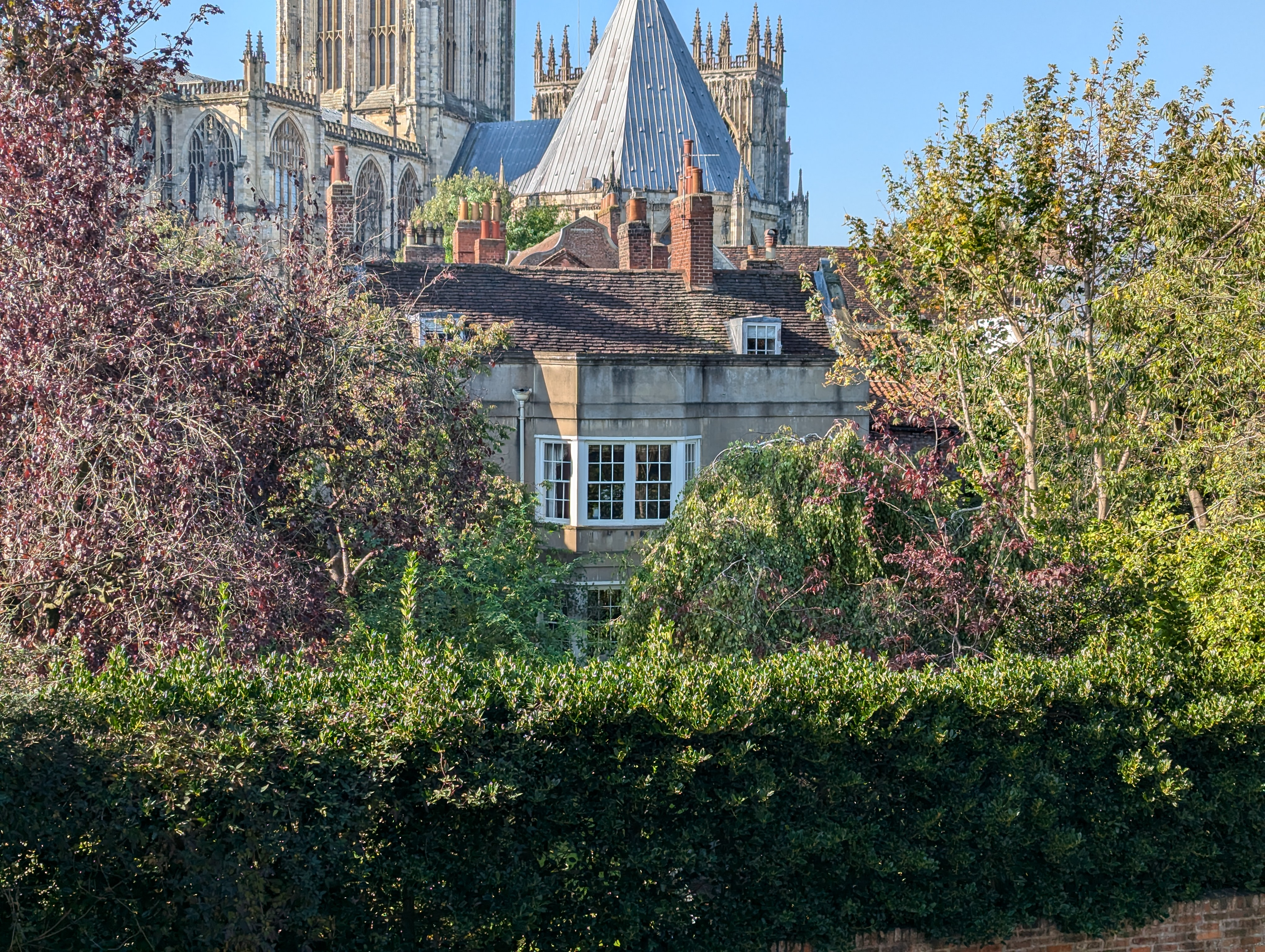
The garden front in 2024

The front part of the building is finished in render marked to look like stone, with stone‑topped gables and brick chimneys rising from a tiled roof, while the rear roof is laid with pantiles. The shaped gable next to No. 6 Chapter House Street has brick coping, and the rendered parapet elsewhere is finished with a moulded stone top. Behind this is an extension built in orange‑grey brick with a pantile roof and brick stacks.

The boundary wall includes two six‑panel doors set in moulded surrounds, one with a cornice supported on grooved brackets. Within the wall is the two‑storey front of the house, arranged in two bays at right angles. The main door has three moulded panels backed with planking, and to its right is a fixed nine‑pane window. Above is a canted bay with sash windows in a 4-12-4 pattern. The bay to the right has a round‑arched staircase window with radial glazing. A rainwater head shaped like an inverted bell sits in the angle between the bays.

The garden elevation has two storeys and attic rooms, arranged in three bays, with a full‑height canted bay window of four lights in the centre. All other windows are 12‑pane sashes. Raised bands mark the first floor and eaves, beneath a plain parapet that partly hides two small, flat‑topped attic dormers.

The garage is a single‑storey structure with a loft, entered through a door at the right end of the boundary wall, and has a brick dentilled eaves cornice.

=== Interior ===
Inside, fragments of timber framing can be seen in the cellar beneath the main staircase and in the front left room on the ground floor. The entrance hall has a moulded dado rail and cornice. The front right room includes a moulded cornice and a corner fireplace from around 1700, with panelled jambs, a shaped shelf, and an overmantel set between fluted pilasters with a moulded top.

The front centre room has a reeded door surround with angle roundels, raised and fielded panelling to the dado, and a reeded cornice. A secondary staircase leads to the attic, with a closed string, slender balusters, a turned newel and a handrail that rises in a ramped line.

The main staircase climbs around an open well to the first floor, with a closed string, turned balusters and a moulded handrail rising to square newels. On the first floor, the landing has a coved ceiling with a moulded cornice. The front right room has a moulded cornice and a corner fireplace in a moulded surround with a cornice shelf. The rear right room has a moulded cornice and a plain fireplace.

== See also ==
- Grade II* listed buildings in the City of York
- Listed buildings in York (within the city walls, northern part)
