= Cromwell House (York) =

Listed building in York, England

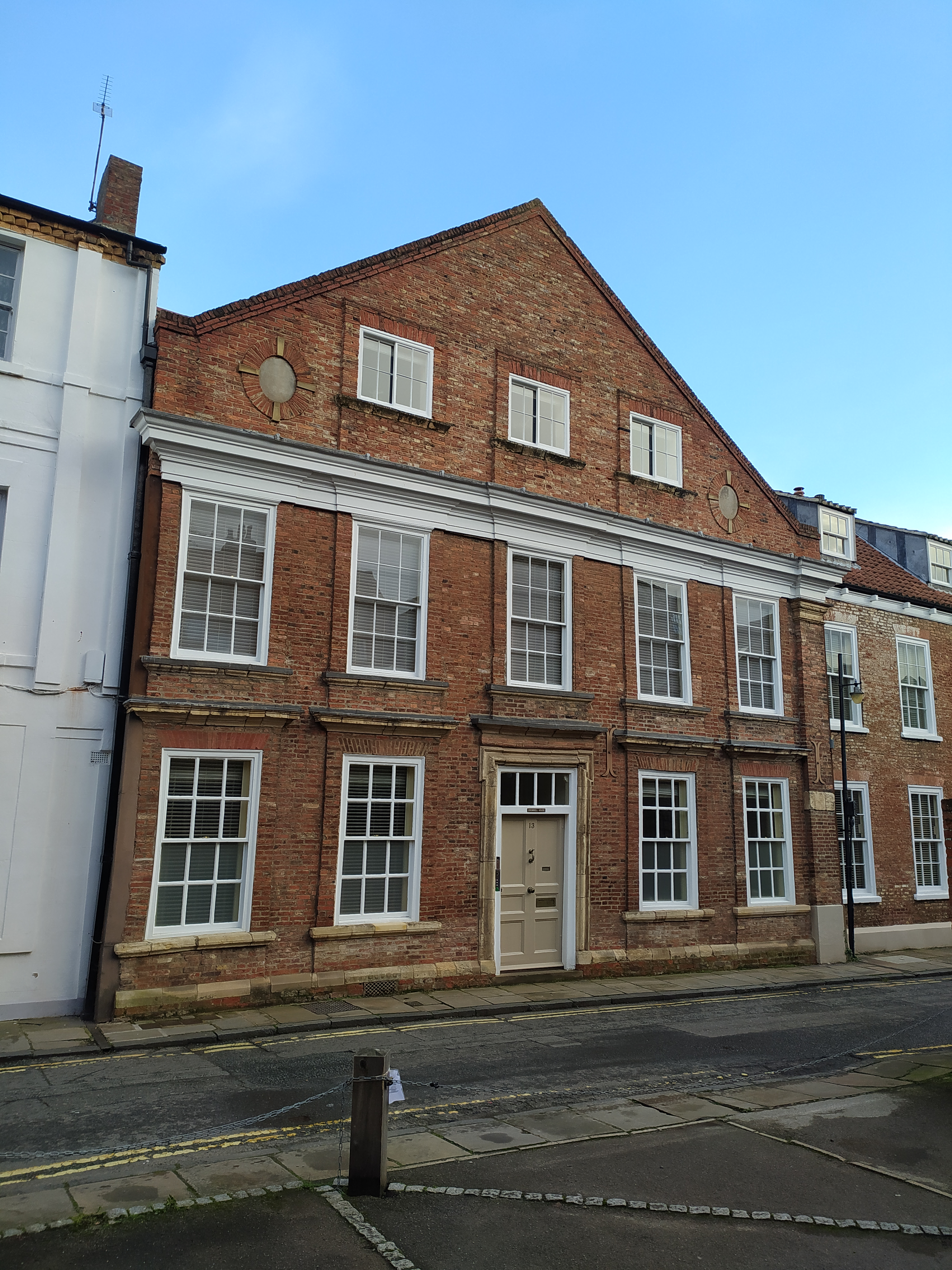
- The house in 2020
- Interactive map of the Cromwell House area

General information
- Status: Converted to flats
- Location: Ogleforth, York, England
- Coordinates: 53°57′46″N 1°04′46″W
- Completed: c. 1700
- Renovated: 19th century (altered and extended) c. 1974 (front gable rebuilt) c. 1980 (renovated); 2011 (converted)

Technical details
- Floor count: 2 + attic

Design and construction
- Designations

Listed Building – Grade II*
- Official name: Cromwell House
- Designated: 14 June 1954
- Reference no.: 1257048

Cromwell House is a Grade II* listed house on Ogleforth in the city centre of York, England.

The house was built in about 1700, and is of two storeys, with an attic. It is roughly square in plan. The rear half of the house is lower than the front part, and was originally under two separate roofs, each with its own gable, an arrangement altered in the 19th century. Between the two parts of the rear half is a timber-framed partition, which survives from an earlier building on the site, and the roof also has much reused timber. The interior was remodelled in about 1760, from which time the staircase survives.

The principle interest of the house lies in its facade, which the Royal Commission on Historic Monuments described as "architecturally ambitious". It is of five bays, and originally had pilasters at each end, one of which survives. It also originally had an entablature running the full width of the second storey, which has also been lost. The doorway has a moulded stone surround. The ground and first floor windows are all 12-pane sashes, while the pediment has three small rectangular windows flanked by a pair of oval windows.

In 1974, the front of the house was rebuilt, and the rear gable demolished in the 19th century was rebuilt. The building was renovated in about 1980, for use as offices, but in 2011, it was converted into flats.

== See also ==
- Grade II* listed buildings in the City of York
- Listed buildings in York (within the city walls, northern part)
