= Ogleforth =

Street in York, England

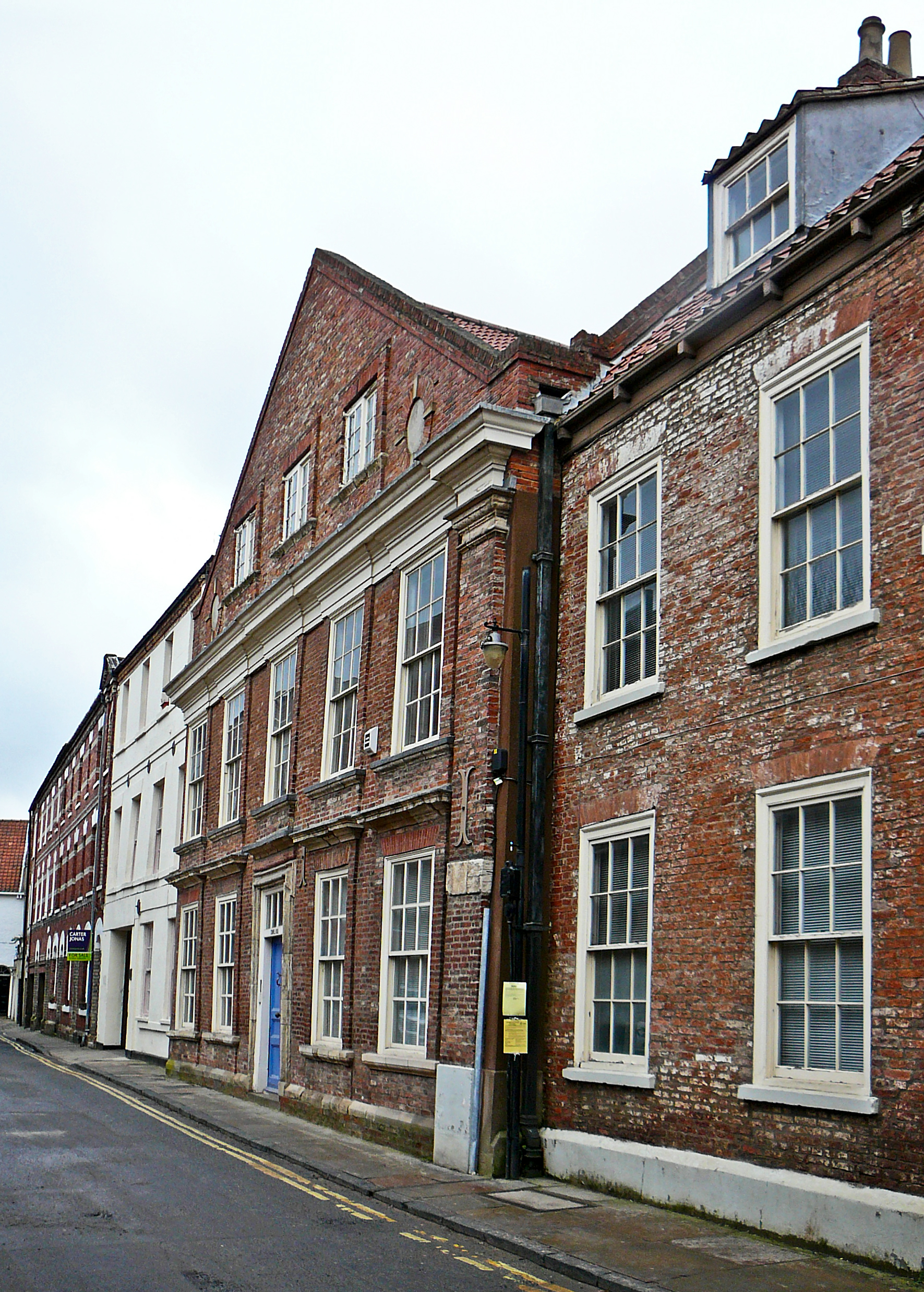
- Looking north-west on Ogleforth
- Location within York
- Location: York, England
- Coordinates: 53.9628°N 1.0798°W
- North west end: Chapter House Street
- South east end: Goodramgate; Aldwark

Ogleforth is a street in the city centre of York, in England.

== History ==
The street lies immediately inside the north-east section of the York city walls; this part of the walls' alignment is unchanged from the Roman Eboracum. Remains of a barracks building and store have been excavated along the street. The first appearance of the name "Ogleforth" was around 1110, it referring to a ford named for either an owl, or a person with the name Ugel. The ford may have crossed a ditch between the street and the walls.

The street long lay within the close of York Minster. This was enclosed by a wall from 1285, and one of its four gates cut Ogleforth in half. Inside the gate, a small lane connected the street to the rear entrance of St William's College. However, the street had its own church, St John-del-Pyke, until 1553, when Archbishop Holgate's School moved into the church and parsonage house. The gate was demolished in 1700.

In 1796, a Catholic school was established on the street, surviving until about 1870. The city's maternity hospital opened on the street in 1908, moving to Acomb in 1922. From 1913 until 1938, there was a Christadelphian chapel on the street, while the York City Mission was based on the street in the 1940s.

== Layout and architecture ==
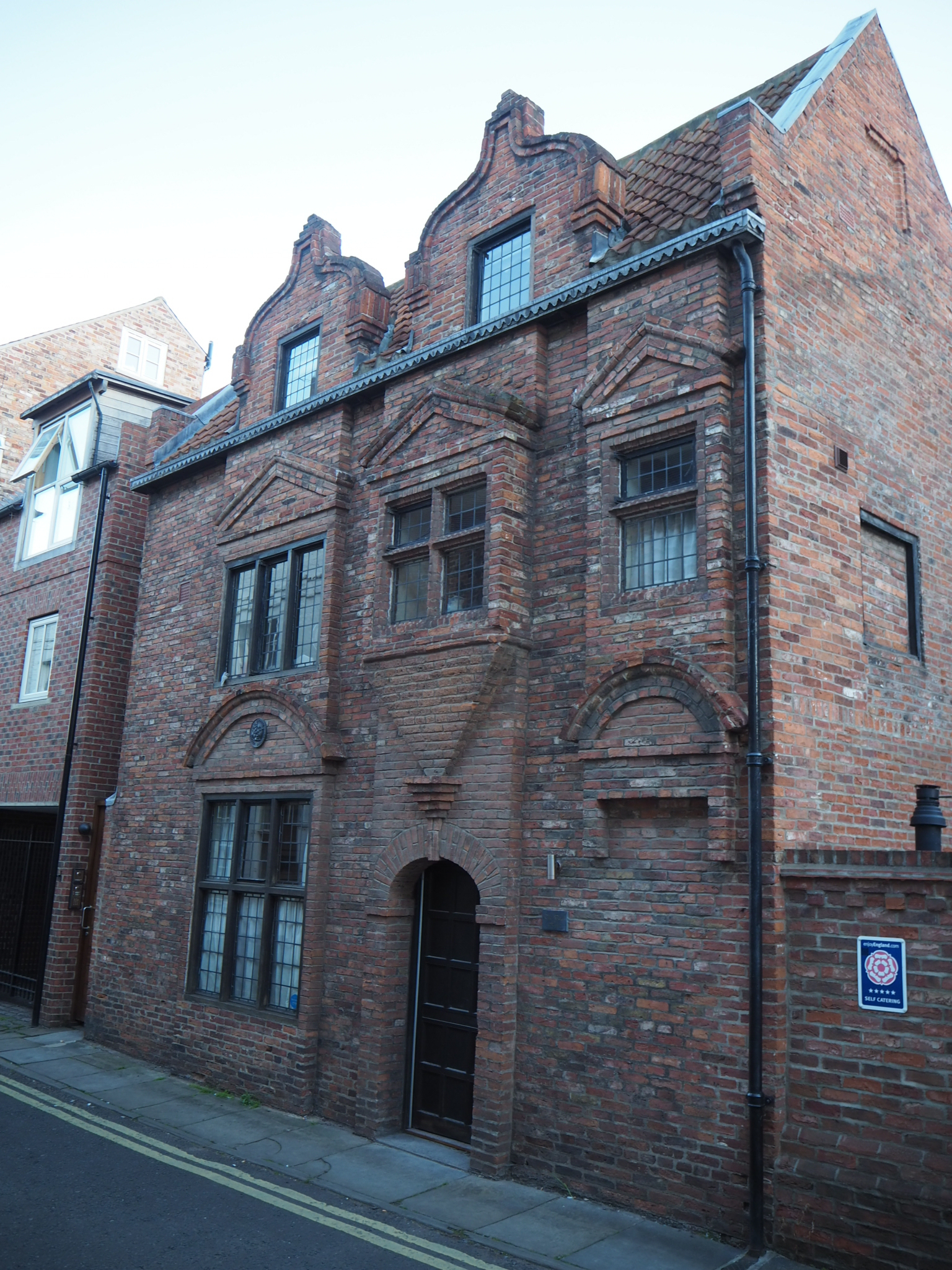
The Dutch House

The street runs north-west, from the junction of Goodramgate and Aldwark, until it turns 90 degrees to run south-west as Chapter House Street.

Notable buildings on the north-east side of the street include the 18th-century 1 Ogleforth; 3, 5 and 7 Ogleforth, built about 1830 but including an earlier wall; the early-19th century 9 Ogleforth; the early-18th century 11 Ogleforth; and Cromwell House, built about 1700. On the south-west side are the mid-17th century Dutch House; 8 Ogleforth, originally part of Thackray's Brewery; and the timber-framed 16-20 Ogleforth, built in the 16th century but now used as garages.
