= An Inventory of the Historical Monuments in the City of York =

Work by the Royal Commission on the Historical Monuments of England

- Cover of the first volume (1962)
- Author: Royal Commission on the Historical Monuments of England
- Language: English
- Genre: History and architecture
- Publisher: Royal Commission on the Historical Monuments of England
- Publication date: Volume 1: 1962; Volume 2: 1972; Volume 3: 1972; Volume 4: 1975; Volume 5: 1981

An Inventory of the Historical Monuments in the City of York is a five-volume historical and architectural publication on the City of York issued by the Royal Commission on Historical Monuments of England between 1962 and 1981. The volumes are subtitled Eburacum, The Defences, South-West of the Ouse, Outside the City Walls East of the Ouse and The Central Area. A sixth volume, covering York Minster, was planned but never issued.

== Volumes ==
=== One: Eburacum ===
Covers infrastructure such as roads and military and civilian locations, inscriptions, burials and material fragments around Roman York. The volume included 70 plates, 89 figures and a folding map. The book's preface was written by Robert Gascoyne-Cecil, 6th Marquess of Salisbury, then chairman of the Royal Commission on Historical Monuments of England.

=== Two: The Defences ===
Details the post-Roman period up to around 1960, with a focus on York city walls. York Castle and the Old Baile are mentioned but are covered more deeply by the Victoria County History volume on the city.

=== Three: South-West of the Ouse ===
Focused on the area around Micklegate, across the River Ouse from the city centre. It mainly features ecclesiastical and secular monuments.

=== Four: Outside the City Walls East of the Ouse ===
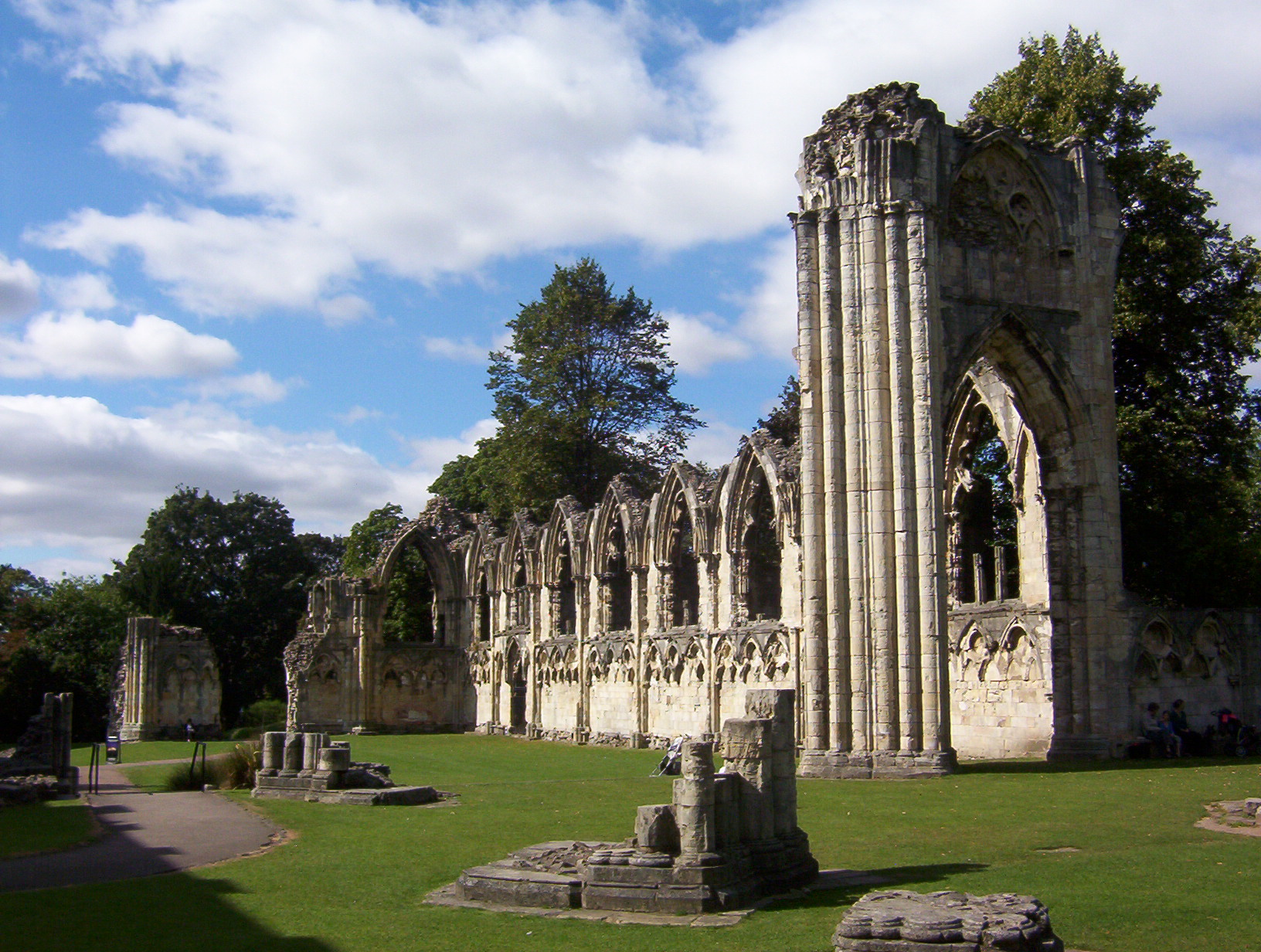
The ruins of St Mary's Abbey are covered in the fourth volume.

Settlements outwith the city walls are the focus of the fourth volume. These areas became part of the City of York in the 1800s. Focus areas are St Mary's Abbey and the King's Manor.

=== Five: The Central Area ===
Moving inside the city walls, this volume covers the left bank of the Ouse, as well as evaluating churches, public buildings and houses.
