= Vivien Swan =

British archaeologist (1943–2009)

Vivien Grace Swan
- Born: Vivien Grace Bishop; 12 January 1943; London, UK
- Died: 1 January 2009 (aged 65); Scarborough, North Yorkshire, UK
- Occupation: Archaeologist
- Board member of: Rei Cretariae Romanae Fautores

Academic background
- Education: Cardiff University

Academic work
- Institutions: Royal Commission on the Historical Monuments of England

Vivien Grace Swan (née Bishop) (12 January 1943 – 1 January 2009) was a British archaeologist. She made a significant contribution to the study of Roman pottery in Britain and internationally.

== Career ==
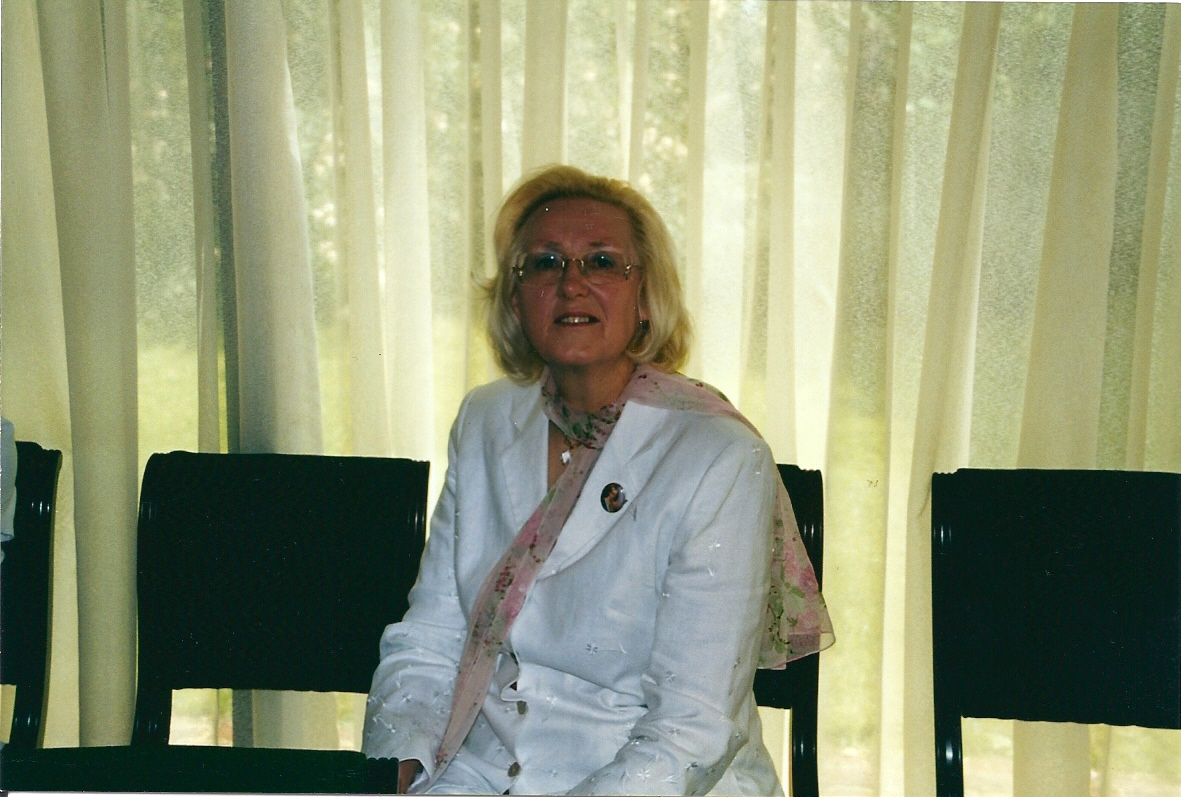
Vivien Swan

Swan read archaeology at Cardiff University, graduating in 1965. After graduation she worked on the Summer School at Wroxeter Roman City. She learnt to excavate with Leslie Alcock at Dinas Powys hillfort whilst still at school in south Wales and, as an undergraduate, excavated with Richard J. C. Atkinson and Stuart Piggott at Wayland's Smithy and on the Durham University training course at Coria (Corbridge).

In December 1965 she was appointed an investigator at the Royal Commission on the Historical Monuments of England, and was one of the first women to take up such an appointment in any of the Royal Commissions. Originally based in their Salisbury Office, she transferred to York in 1975. Early on in her career she investigated Roman kiln sites, which led to the publication of the major gazetteer of pottery kilns in Roman Britain in 1984. This has now been digitised by the Study Group for Roman Pottery and made available as an online resource. Swan was able to take early retirement from RCHME in 1996 giving her time to pursue her Roman pottery interests in earnest. She became an Honorary Research Fellow at Durham University and a founder member of its Centre for Provincial Archaeology.

In the 1980s and 90s, she undertook some pioneering work on Roman pottery, including the identification of a series of pottery heads of the Severan imperial family at York also reviewing the evidence for the distribution of African-style pottery at York and other Roman military sites in Northern Britain and Wales. Swan also studied North African style pottery from various sites on Scotland's Antonine Wall, built by the Numidian governor of Roman Britain, Quintus Lollius Urbicus, including one type being a casserole dish that may have been a precursor to the modern tajine.

Another significant piece of work was on the pottery from the Millennium excavations at Carlisle which looked holistically at the development of trade and production. Despite being diagnosed with cancer in 1998, Swan became Research Fellow and Chief Ceramicist from 1998-2001 on the Nottingham University-led excavations of the late Roman fort at Dichin in Bulgaria. This led to the production of a chronology for the late Roman and early Byzantine pottery there. She mentored pottery scholars from Bulgaria and Georgia.

She was awarded a DLitt from Cardiff University in 2001.

== Affiliations and other activities ==
Swan was a member of the Study Group for Roman Pottery since its inception in 1971. After formalisation in 1985, she served as its first President until 1990 and then as a committee member. She was an active participant in almost every conference, frequently presenting papers. and organised six of them. She was also a regular participant in the International Congress of Roman Frontier Studies and the Rei Cretariae Romanae Fautores, an international society dedicated to the study of Roman ceramics, becoming a Trustee of the UK-based Fautores Trust.

== Awards and honours ==
Lifetime achievement award at the British Archaeological Awards in November 2008 at the British Museum.

== Selected publications ==
- 1984. The pottery kilns of Roman Britain. RCHME.
- 1988. Pottery in Roman Britain (4th edition). Shire Archaeology.
- 1995. (with H G Welfare) Roman Camps in England: the field archaeology. RCHME.
- 2009. Ethnicity, Conquest and Recruitment: Two case studies from the Northern Military Provinces. JRA Supplementary Series 72. Portsmouth, Rhode Island.
