= Red Tower (York) =

Medieval tower in York, England

- Part of York city walls
- York, England
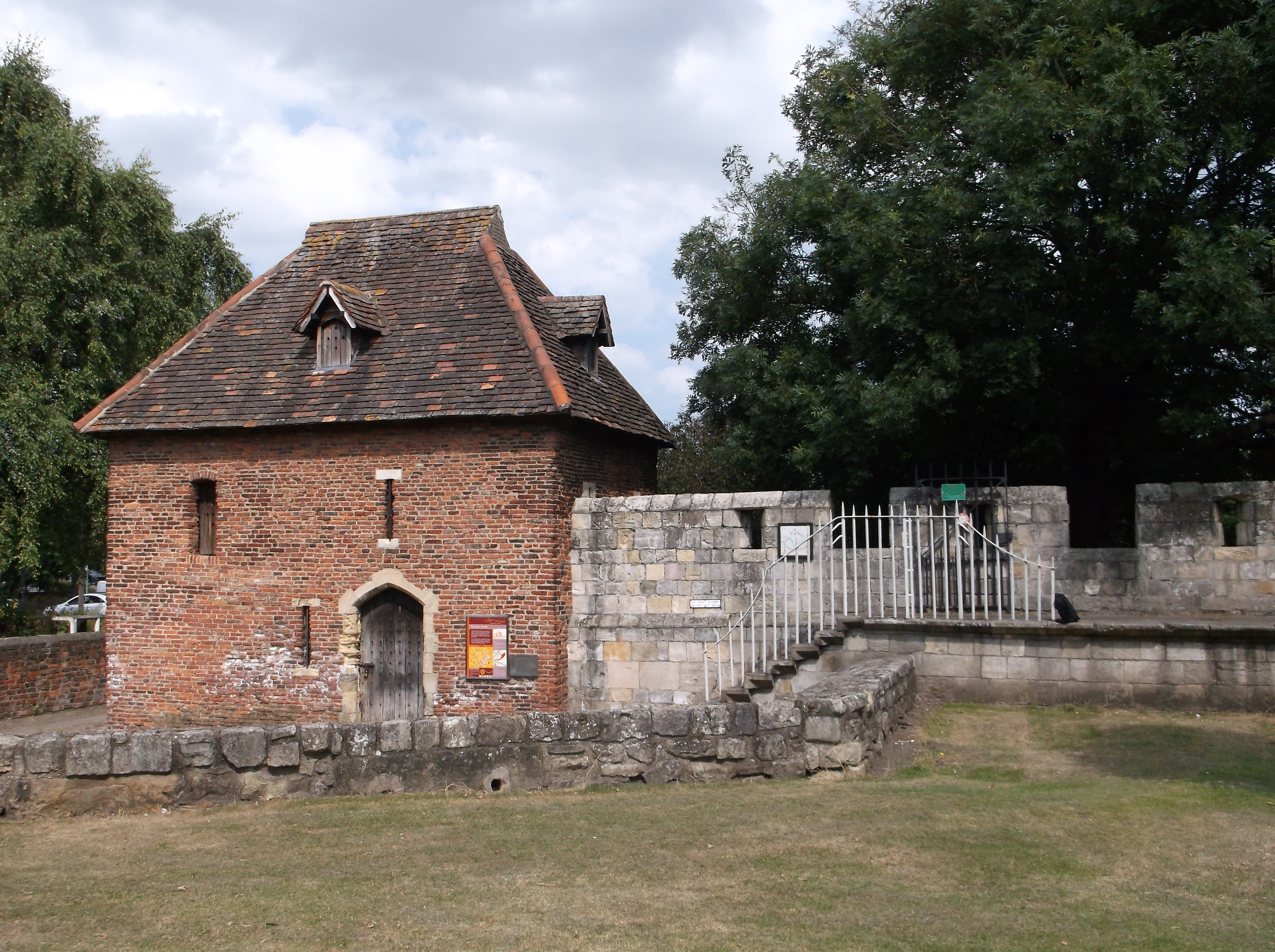
- The Red Tower in 2013

Site information
- Type: Tower
- Owner: City of York Council
- Open to the public: Yes

Location
- Shown within North Yorkshire
- Coordinates: 53.958026°N 1.0714369°W
- Height: 16.5 feet (5.0 m)

Site history
- Materials: Brick; Timber
- Battles/wars: Siege of York

Listed Building – Grade I
- Official name: Red Tower
- Designated: 14 June 1954
- Reference no.: 1259296

The Red Tower is a medieval tower that formed part of the city defences of York, England. It is located on the city walls at Foss Islands Road, on the stretch of wall north of Walmgate Bar and is the only brick tower in the city.

== History ==
The tower was constructed in c. AD 1490 following a protracted series of improvements to the city walls in this area under Richard III and his successor Henry VII. It is the only brick tower in the city walls and this lends its name, which was first referred to in 1511. The tower marked the southern edge of the walls where they met the King's Fishpool, restarting at the tower at Jewbury.

The Tilers' Guild were employed by the City Corporation to build the tower in brick, as it was cheaper than stone. This led to a rift between the Tilers' and the Masons' Guilds with the former asking the city for protection following threats against them and damage to their tools by the Mason's.

The tower was damaged by artillery fire during the 1644 Siege of York. Repairs to the tower started in February 1645 and continued until 1648.

The red tower fell into disrepair by 1776, where it was shown in a drawing to have no roof and to be missing a wall. It was again repaired by 1800 and used as a stable. In the early 19th century it became known as 'Brimstone Tower' because of its use as a store for gunpowder.

After the Fishpool was filled in 1854, Foss Islands Road was constructed near the tower. It was repaired by George Fowler Jones in 1857-1858 and it is this restoration which is mostly visible today.

=== Modern use ===
The building was listed in 1954 alongside Fishergate Postern tower, Fishergate Bar, Walmgate Bar, and the city walls that join these structures together.

In 2014 a Community Interest Company, Red Tower York, was set up in order to manage the site. The site was converted into a community hub and cafe, for which it was awarded a York Design Award in 2018.

== Architecture ==
The tower is brick, built on a stone foundation - the stone foundations may have been under the water level of the King's Fishpool. It is rectangular and stands to a height of 16.5 feet (5.0 m) excluding the roof. The original height is estimated to have been c.30 feet (9.1 m). The city walls join the tower on its south-west side, and modern walls of reused stone surround its southern and western sides. Externally there are arrowslits visible on the upper floor. The north side has a garderobe with a sloping stone roof, though the raised floor level makes its use impossible.

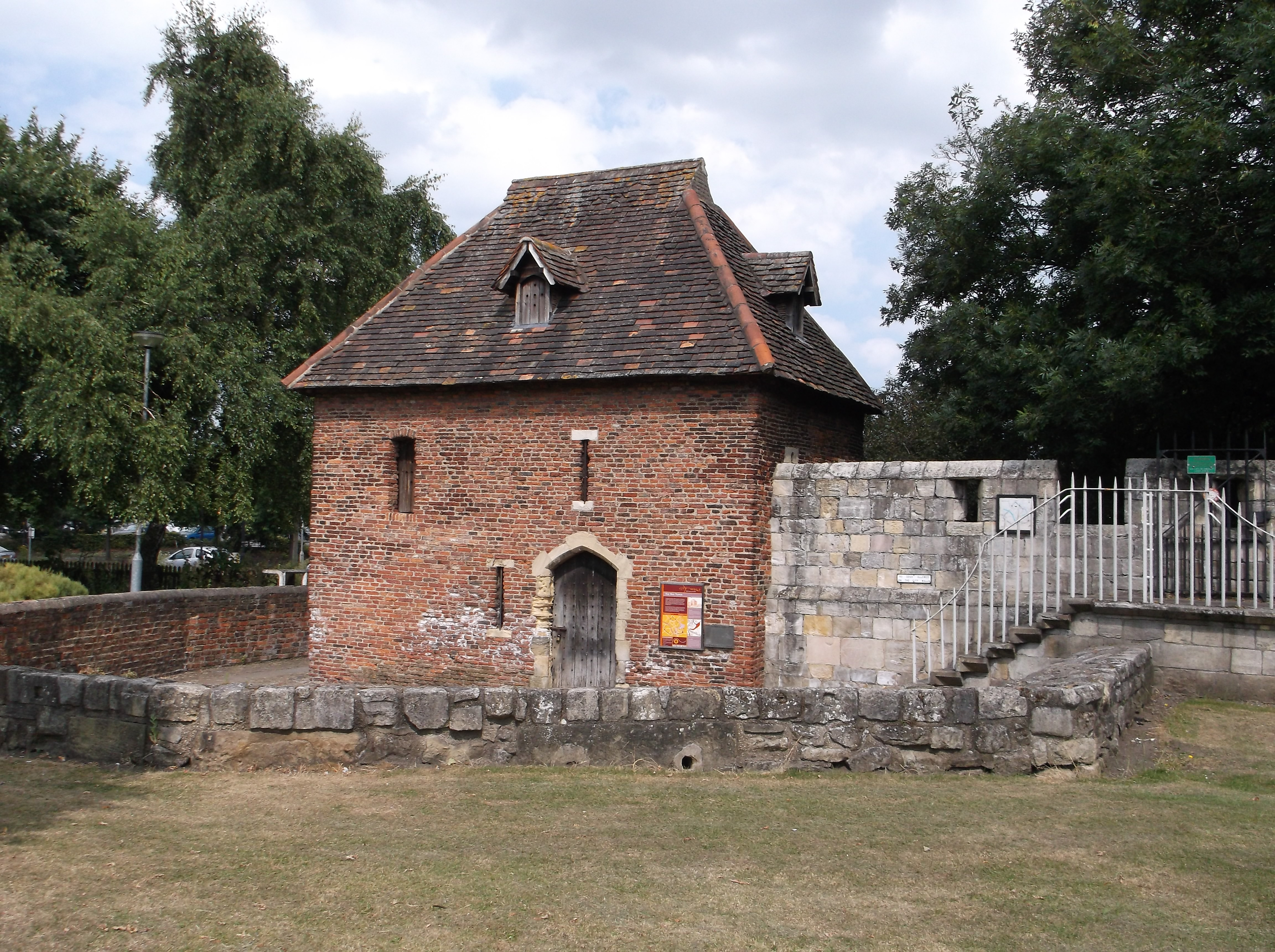

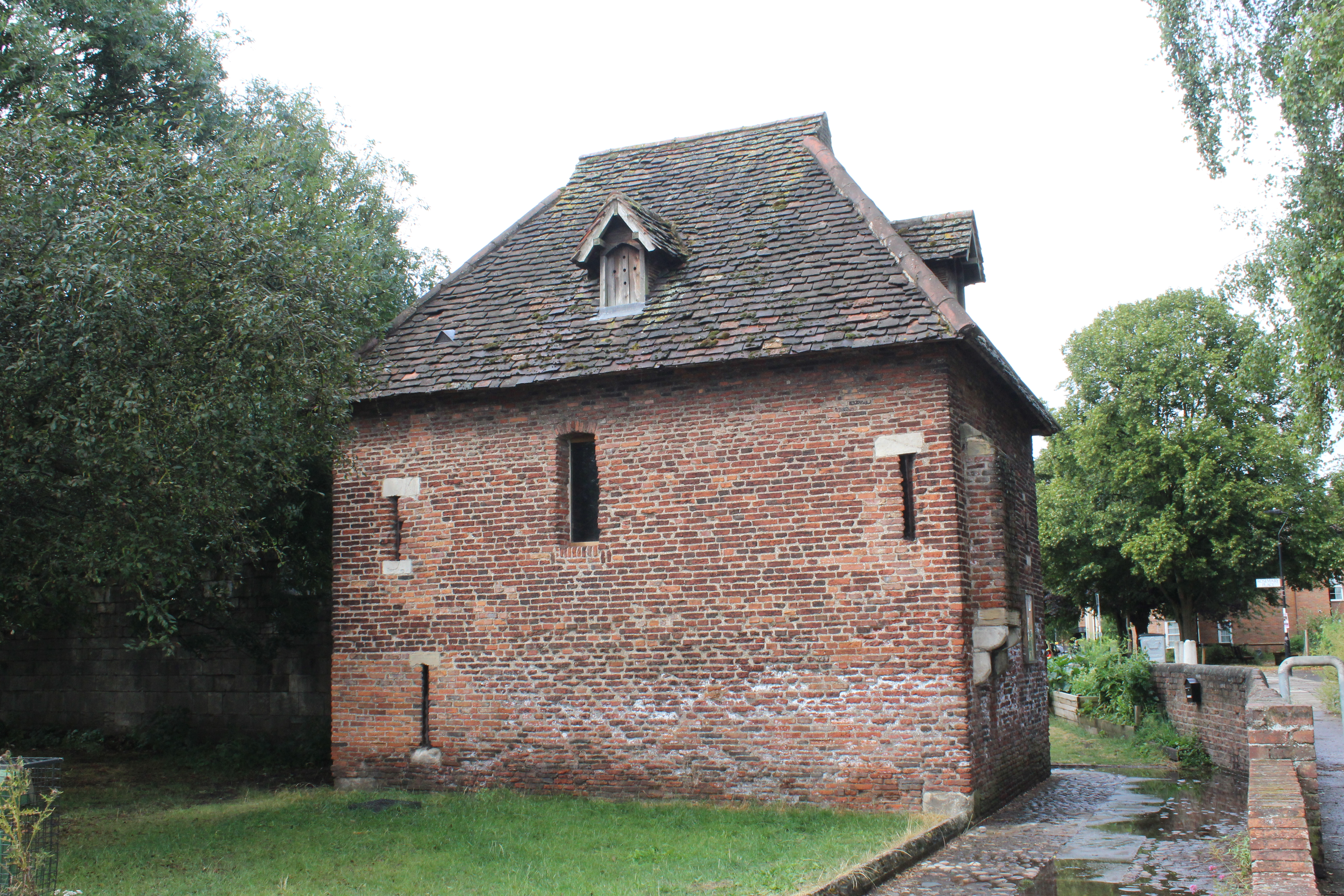

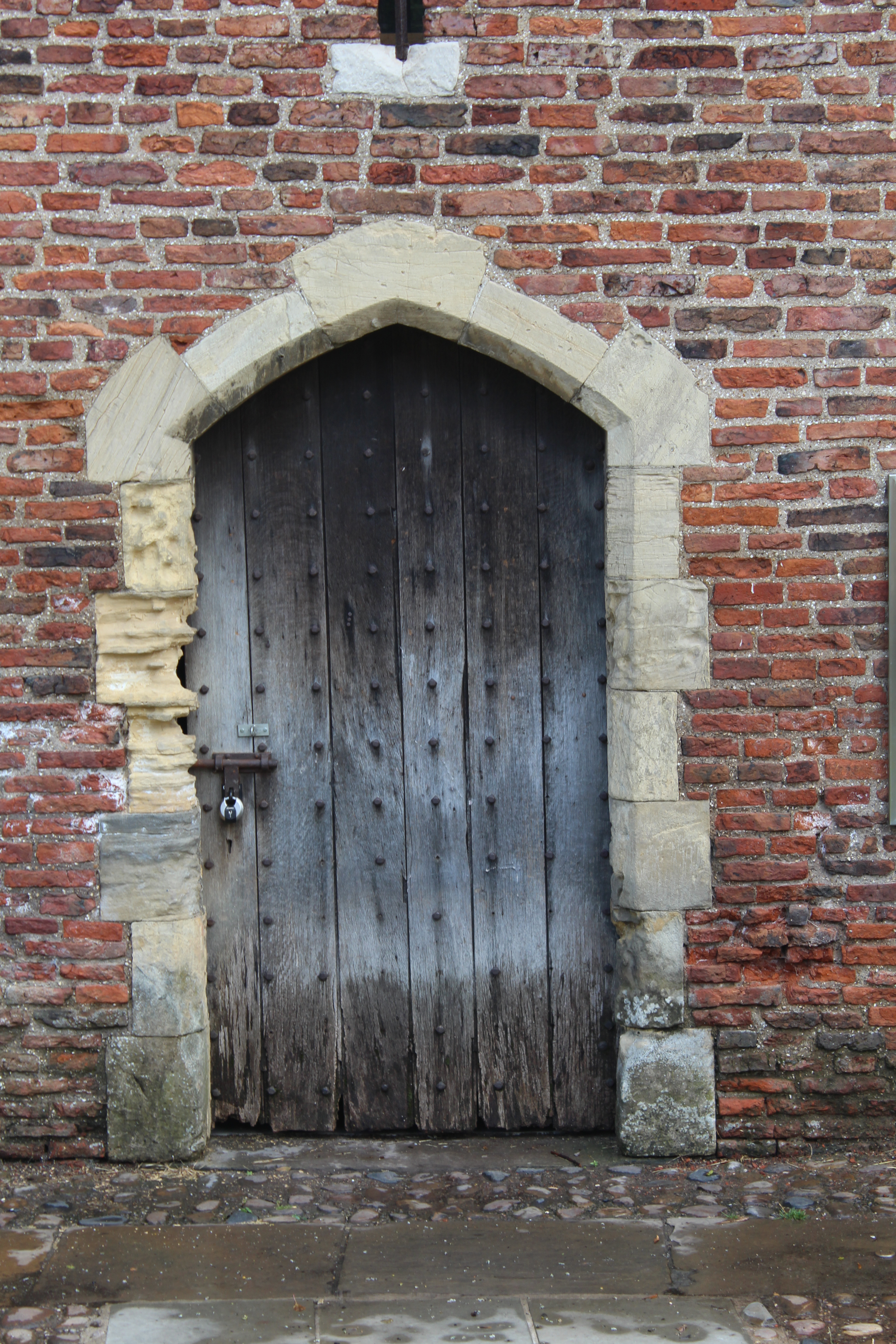
