= The Dutch House, York =

Listed building in York, England

The Dutch House
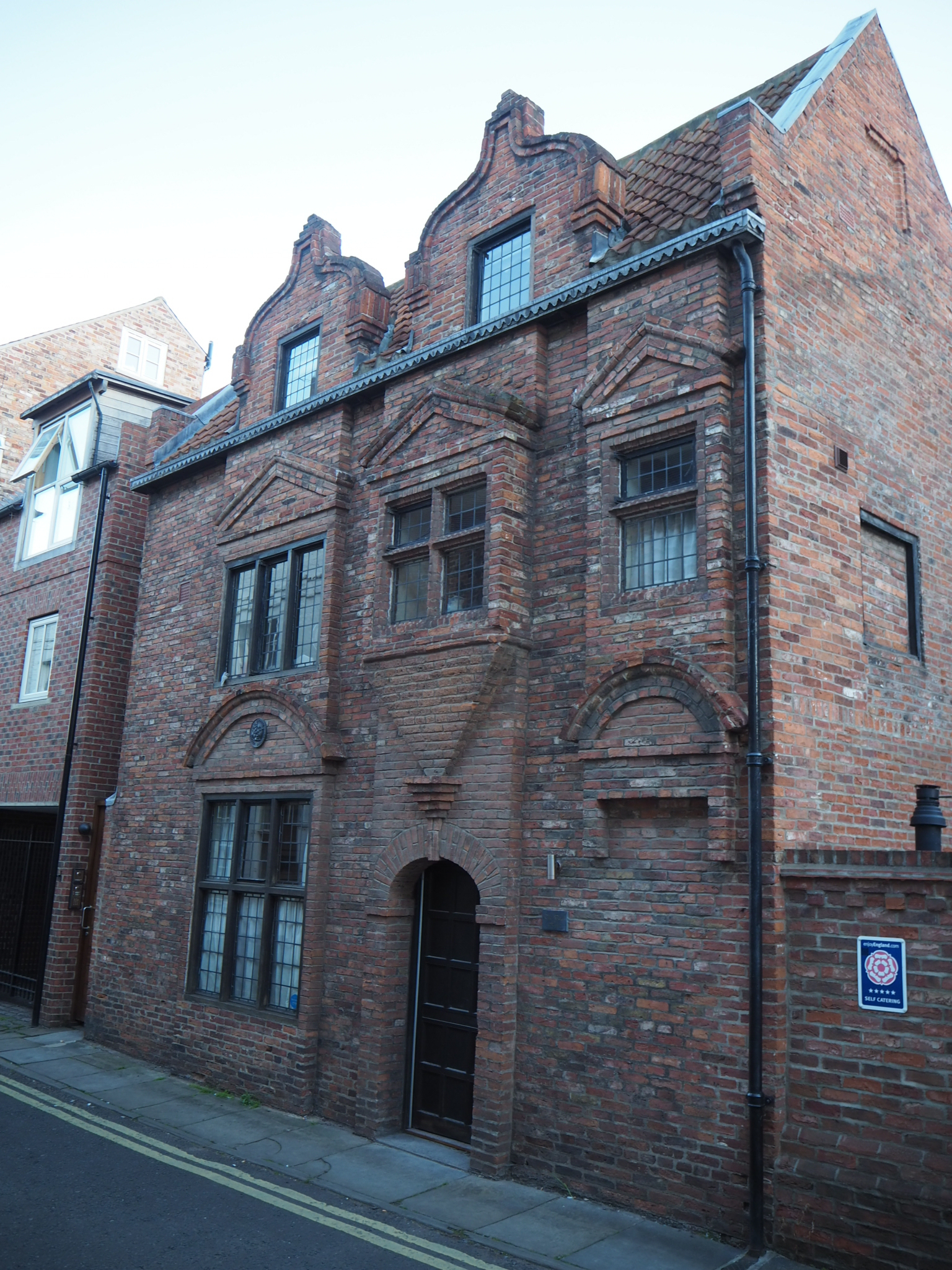
- The building in 2018
- Interactive map of the The Dutch House area

General information
- Location: Ogleforth, York, England
- Coordinates: 53°57′45″N 1°04′45″W
- Completed: c. 1650
- Renovated: Late 17th century (gables); 1956 (extensively rebuilt)

Technical details
- Floor count: 2 + attic

Design and construction
- Designations

Listed Building – Grade II*
- Official name: The Dutch House
- Designated: 14 June 1954
- Reference no.: 1257039

The Dutch House is a historic house, lying on Ogleforth, in the city centre of York, England.

The house was built in brick in about 1650, with Andrew Graham dating it to 1648. It is a small building and originally had two rooms on the ground floor and one on the first floor. Later in the 17th century, two Dutch gables were added to the front, each with a dormer window. Originally, it is believed to have had only an external staircase, suggesting that it was not a domestic building.

In the 18th century, the building's interior was heavily altered, and by the early 19th century it had been divided into three tenements. In 1954, it was Grade II* listed but it was in a poor state of repair, and in 1956, John Smith's Brewery announced plans to demolish it. Instead, the York Civic Trust restored the building, with much of the front wall entirely rebuilt, as a copy of the original. It then formed part of the brewery, but in 2010 was converted to accommodation, and has since been available to let for holidays. This more recent work won a York Design Award.

The building has two storeys and an attic. It is four bays wide, with the leftmost bay having no windows or doors. The other three all differ: a window with three lights on each floor in the second bay, a round-headed door with an oriel window above in the third bay, and a smaller first floor window in the fourth bay, with the ground floor window having been filled in, though its pediment remains.

== See also ==
- Grade II* listed buildings in the City of York
- Listed buildings in York (within the city walls, northern part)
