= York city walls =

Grade I listed urban defence in England

Coordinates: 53.9553°N 1.0810°W

York City Walls
- The city walls near York Minster

- Location within North Yorkshire
- Type: Fortification
- Location: York, England

History
- Built: 13th–14th century
- Original use: Urban defence

Site notes
- Area: 2.11 miles (3.40 kilometres)
- Architectural styles: Medieval, Gothic Revival
- Restored: 19th century
- Current use: Open as a museum
- Owner: City of York Council
- Website: www.york.gov.uk/CityWalls

Listed Building – Grade I
- Official name: Bootham Bar City Wall from Bootham Bar to Layerthorpe, Monk Bar, Robin Hoods Tower
- Designated: 14 June 1954
- Reference no.: 1259293

Scheduled monument
- Official name: York Minster Cathedral Precinct: including Bootham Bar and the length of City Walls extending round the precinct up to Monk Bar
- Designated: 8 October 1937
- Reference no.: 1017777

Scheduled monument
- Official name: City Walls, gates, posterns, moats, mounds, Bayle (or Baile) Hill, St Leonard's Hospital and Merchant Taylor's Hall, Aldwark
- Designated: April 1922
- Reference no.: 1004910

York has, since Roman times, been defended by walls of one form or another. To this day, substantial portions of the walls remain, and York has more miles of intact wall than any other city in England. They are known variously as York City Walls, the Bar Walls and the Roman walls (though this last is a misnomer as very little of the extant stonework is of Roman origin, and the course of the wall has been substantially altered since Roman times). The walls are generally 13 feet (4 m) high and 6 feet (1.8 m) wide. They are the longest town walls in England.

== History ==
Location map of the major features of York city walls

=== Roman walls ===
The original walls were built around 71 AD, when the Romans erected a fort (castra) occupying about 50 acres or 21.5 hectares near the banks of the River Ouse. The rectangle of walls was built as part of the fort's defences. The foundations and the line of about half of these Roman walls form part of the existing walls, as follows:

- a section (the west corner, including the Multangular Tower) in the Museum Gardens
- the north-west and north-east sections between Bootham Bar and Monk Bar
- a further stretch between Monk Bar and the Merchant Taylors' Hall, at the end of which the lower courses of the east corner of the Roman wall can be seen on the city-centre side of the existing wall.

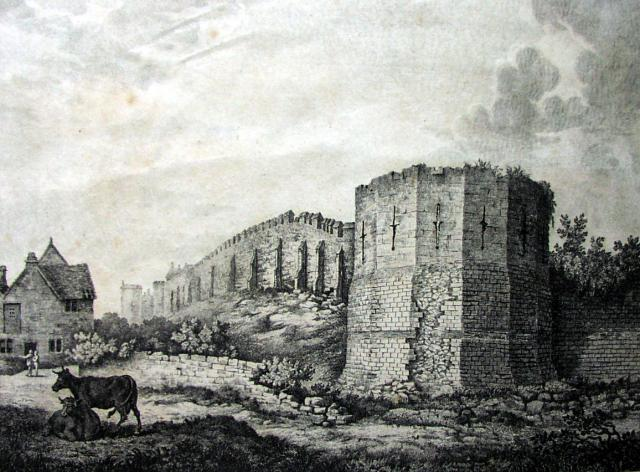
An illustration from 1807 during the reign of King George III showing the Multangular Tower and the city walls

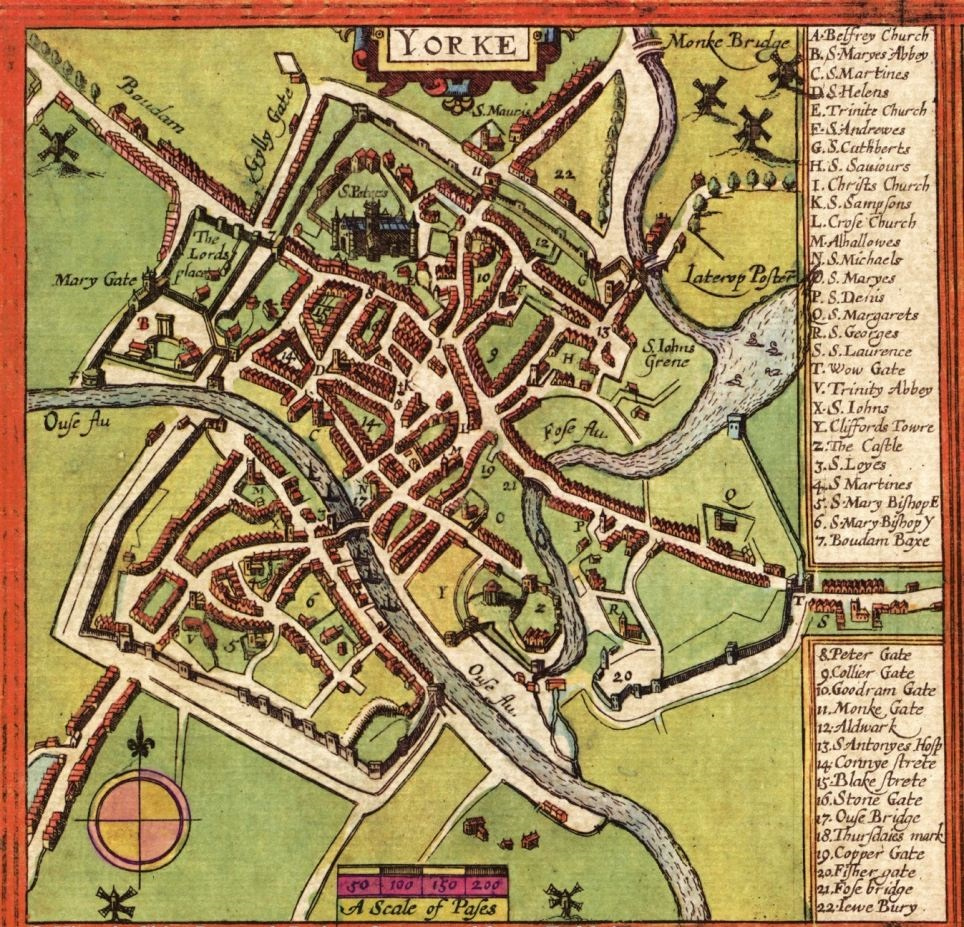
A map of York from 1611 by John Speed

The line of the rest of the Roman wall went south-west from the east corner, crossing the via principalis of the fortress where King's Square is now located. The south corner was in what is now Feasegate, and from here the wall continued northwest to the west corner. The point where the wall crossed the via praetoria is marked by a plaque in St Helen's Square near the Mansion House.

==== Multangular Tower ====
The Multangular Tower in the Museum Gardens is the most noticeable and intact structure remaining from the Roman walls. It was constructed as part of a series of eight similar defensive towers. The walls are almost certainly the creation of Septimius Severus; however, the Multangular Tower is probably a later addition of Constantine the Great around 310–320 AD. It has ten sides, based on a regular fourteen-sided figure designed so that a circle through the internal angles of the internal face is tangential to the curve. The rear four sides are missing to provide access to the interior of the tower. A low plinth or skirt extends out from the lowest course.

The tower stands almost 30 feet (9.1 m) tall, has an external diameter of 48.5 feet (14.8 m) at the base and 46 feet (14 m) above the skirt. Length of each side varies from 7.5 feet (2.3 m) to 11 feet (3.4 m) on the inner face. The tower projects beyond the curtain wall to a distance of 36.75 feet (11.20 m). The foundations are concrete, atop which the tower extends having a rubble and mortar core between ashlar faced courses of small magnesian limestone blocks. At 15 feet (4.6 m) a scarcement reduces the thickness of the wall from 5 feet (1.5 m) to 3.25 feet (0.99 m), which continues for a further 4 feet (1.2 m) before being capped by 11 feet (3.4 m) of 13th century masonry in which arrowslits can be seen.

==== East Angle Tower ====
Less well-known than the Multangular Tower is the East Angle Tower. It is visible above ground in the grounds of the Merchant Taylors Hall. Partly excavated in 1926, the remains that can be seen today were exposed in 1953.

=== After the Romans ===
The Danes occupied the city in 867. By this time the Roman defences were in poor repair, and the Danes demolished all the towers save the Multangular Tower and restored the walls.

The majority of the remaining walls, which encircle the whole of the medieval city, date from the 13th – 14th century. From the east corner of the Roman walls, the medieval wall extends to Layerthorpe Bridge. After the bridge, the King's Fishpool, a swamp created by the Normans' damming of the River Foss, provided adequate security for the city, and no walls were ever built in this area.

In the Middle Ages the defence of the city was further helped not just by the walls but on the rampart underneath and the ditch surrounding them. The ditch along the walls was once 60 feet (18.3m) wide and 10 feet (3m) deep. In modern times the ditch was almost all filled in and no longer exists. For this reason the ground directly around the walls is higher in most places than it would have been in medieval times.

The walls resume beyond the now canalised Foss at the Red Tower, a brick building which has been much restored over the years. They continue south and west around the Walmgate area, terminating in another tower (Fishergate Postern), near York Castle, which was formerly surrounded by its own walls and a moat.

A small stretch of wall on the west side of Tower Gardens terminates at Davy Tower, another brick tower located next to the River Ouse. This originally ran up to the castle walls, with a postern on Tower Street.

Beyond the Ouse, the walls resume at Skeldergate, where there was once another postern. They climb past Baile Hill, take a right turn and proceed north-west parallel to the Inner Ring Road. Near the railway station, they turn right again in a north-easterly direction, finishing at Barker Tower on the Ouse.

Barker Tower was once linked to Lendal Tower by a chain across the river, parallel to the 19th-century Lendal Bridge. A small stretch of wall then leads to the entrance to Museum Gardens, the Multangular Tower and the original line of the Roman walls.

The walls were repaired during the English Civil War by Parliamentarians as well as during the later Jacobite Risings due to fears of an invasion from Scotland.

The walls were restored in the Victorian period after falling into disrepair. The Victorians widened the wall-walk as well as extending it in some areas, (such as in the northern area with views of the cathedral), previously, in some areas, there probably would have only been narrow ledges that could be used to support a timber wall-walk in times of danger. They also rebuilt the battlements and sometimes the tops of the walls. Some slit windows are at the wrong height and some are narrow for the full width of the parapet. Some parts of the walls still have small holes called musket loops from the 17th century for muskets to fire from although they are of uncertain age due to restoration. In the northern area where you have views of the Cathedral, the walls were defended from interval towers which would have been higher than they are now after the Victorian restoration. Many of the merlons spaced along the walls were restored by the Victorians and few originals remain. Perhaps one of the most notable additions to the wall was Robin Hood tower, built in 1889.

Today the walls are a scheduled monument and a grade I listed building.

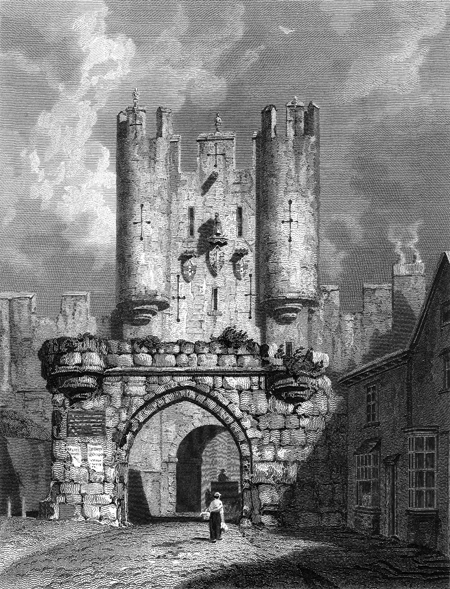
Etching of 1814, showing Micklegate Bar with its ruined barbican still in place in front of it

Micklegate Bar after restoration, with the barbican now demolished

== Bars ==
Bootham Bar with the towers of York Minster in the background.

Walmgate Bar with its barbican, seen from outside the walls

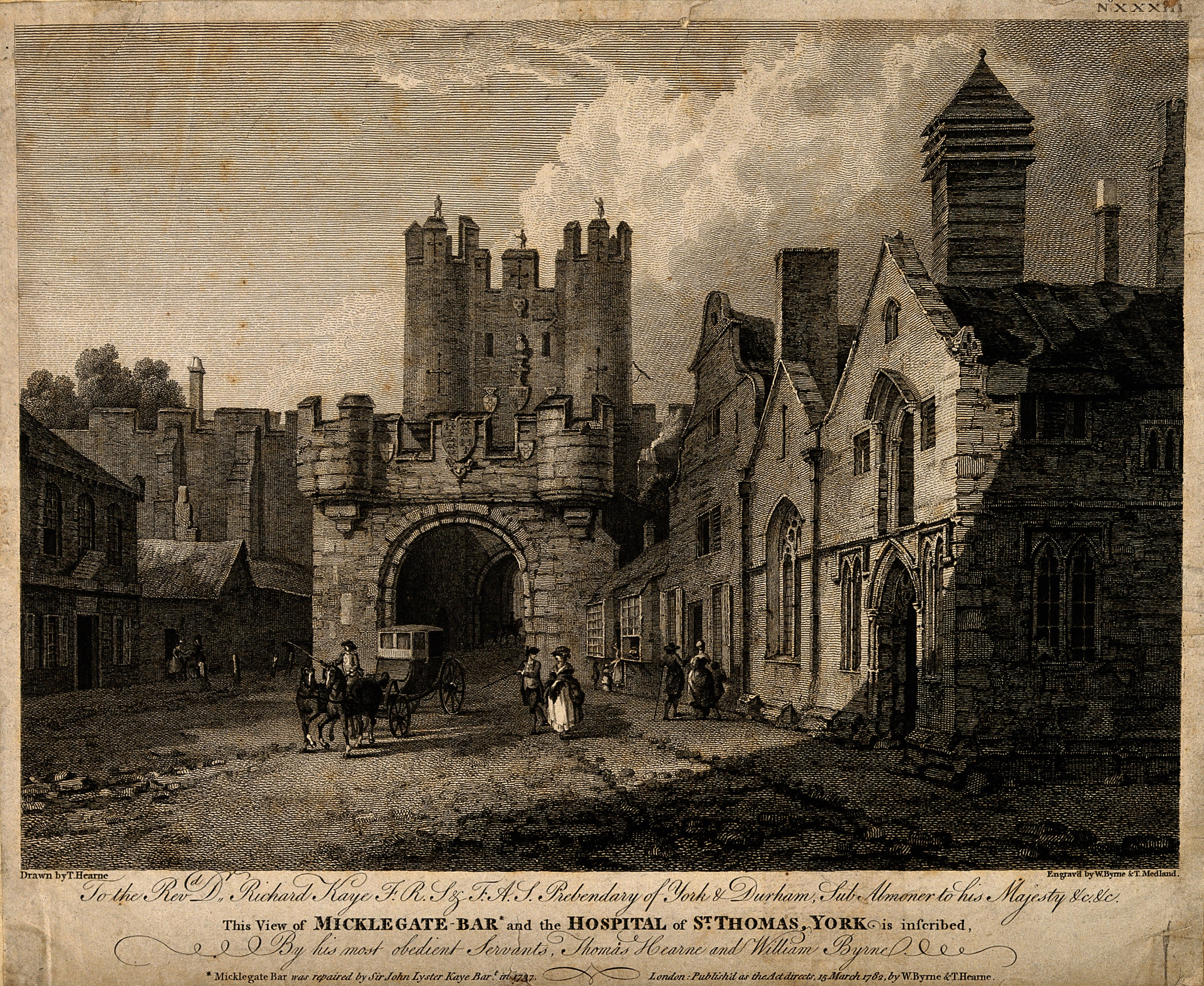
A 1782 engraving showing Micklegate Bar which notes earlier repairs

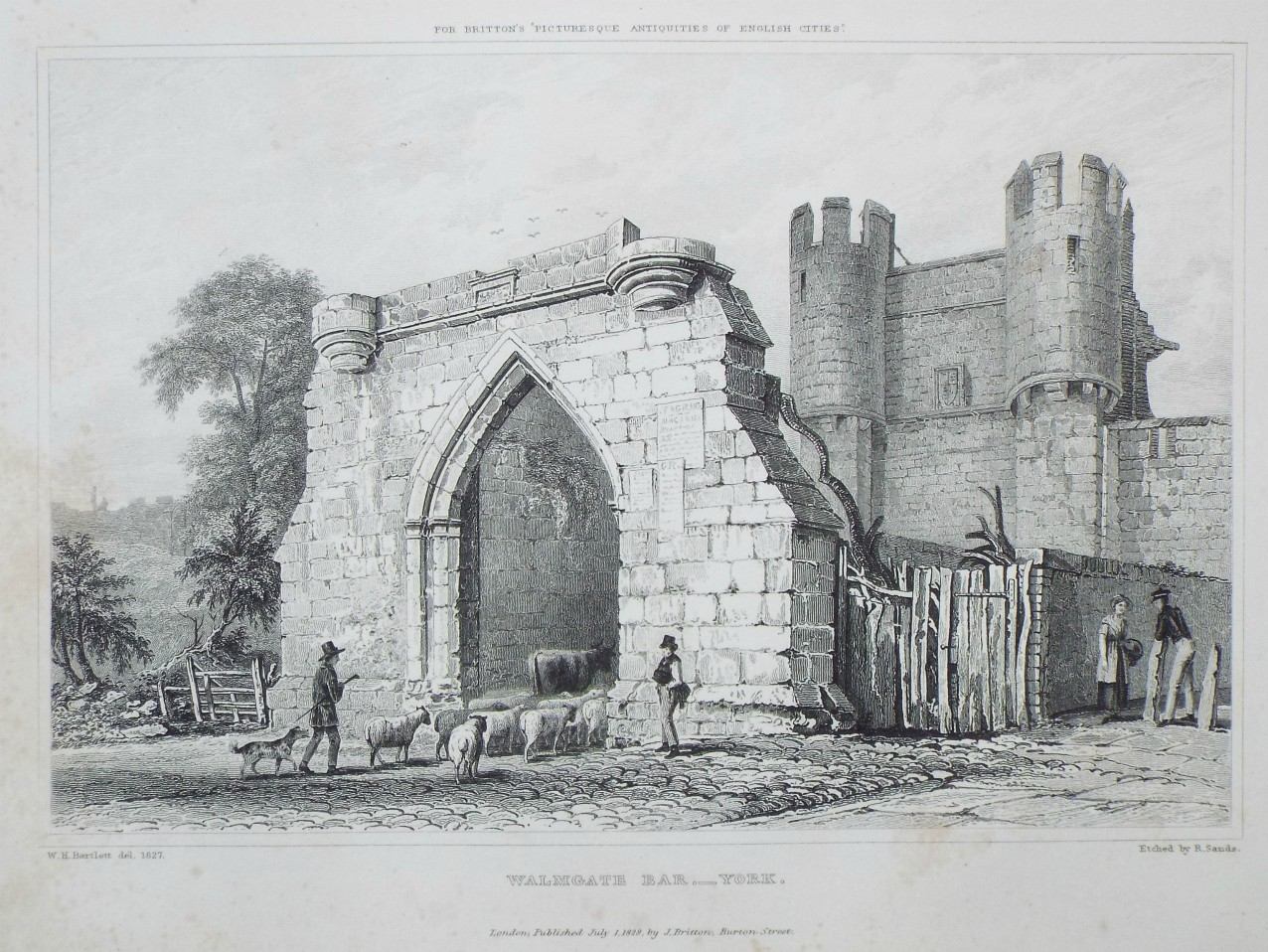
Walmgate Bar in the 1820s before restoration

The walls are punctuated by four main gatehouses, or 'bars', (Bootham Bar, Monk Bar, Walmgate Bar and Micklegate Bar below). These restricted traffic in medieval times, and were used to extract tolls, as well as being defensive positions in times of war.

=== Bootham Bar ===
Although much of Bootham Bar was built in the 14th and 19th centuries, it also has some of the oldest surviving stonework, dating to the 11th century. It stands almost on the site of porta principalis dextra, the north western gate of Eboracum. It was named in the 12th century as barram de Bootham, meaning bar at the booths, after the nearby market booths. It was the last of the bars to lose its barbican, which was removed in 1835.

Land grant records from the 11th century suggest that the Roman Gate was still in use in the late 7th century

In the 14th century, a portcullis and barbican were added to the bar and its height increased to accommodate them. The gateway was damaged in the English Civil War siege of 1644 but repaired a year later. The barbican, and a section of wall, were demolished to make way for the construction of St Leonards Place in the 1830s.

Currently, the bar has doorways on the first floor and three windows to the northeast lighting the second floor. The portcullis slot is still visible but blocked and the portcullis itself is fixed into its current position. The southwest doorway has remained unchanged, but there was one to the west which is now marked by a low recess in the room's wall. The original entrance would have been from an adjoining house. Access is by a stone staircase to the first floor situated in St Leonard’s Place.

=== Monk Bar ===
This four-storey gatehouse is the tallest and most elaborate of the four, and was built in the early 14th century. It was intended as a self-contained fort, and each floor is capable of being defended separately. The current gatehouse was built to replace a 12th-century gate known as Munecagate, which stood 100 yards (91 m) to the north-west, on the site of the Roman gate porta decumana – that location is indicated by a slight dip in the earth rampart. From 1993 to 2020, Monk Bar housed a museum called the Richard III Experience at Monk Bar and today, it retains its portcullis in working order.

=== Walmgate Bar ===
Most of Walmgate Bar was built during the 14th century, although the inner gateway dates from the 12th century. It was originally called Walbegate, the word Walbe possibly being an Anglo-Scandinavian personal name. The Bar's most notable feature is its barbican, which is the only one surviving on a town gate in England. It also retains its portcullis and has reproduction 15th-century oak doors. On the inner side, an Elizabethan house, supported by stone Tuscan order columns (originally of Roman origin but modified in 1584), extends out over the gateway. The house was occupied until 1957.

The Bar has been repaired and restored many times over the years, most notably in 1648, following the 1644 Siege of York in the English Civil War when it was bombarded by cannon fire, and in 1840 after it had suffered years of neglect. It was also damaged in 1489 when, along with Fishergate Bar, it was burnt by rebels who were rioting over tax rises.

=== Micklegate Bar ===
The name of this four-storey-high gatehouse is from the Old Norse 'mykla gata' or 'great road', and leads onto Micklegate. It was the traditional ceremonial gate for monarchs entering the city, who, in a tradition dating to Richard II in 1389, touch the state sword when entering the gate.

The lower section was built in the 12th century while the top storeys in the 14th; the original barbican was removed in 1826. At least six reigning monarchs passed through this gate. Its symbolic value led to traitors' severed heads being displayed on the defences. Heads left there to rot included: Henry Hotspur Percy (1403), Henry Scrope, 3rd Baron Scrope of Masham (1415), Richard Plantagenet, 3rd Duke of York (1461), and Thomas Percy, 7th Earl of Northumberland (1572).

The Bar was inhabited until the 20th century. The upper two floors contain living quarters, which today are a museum known as the City Walls Experience at Micklegate Bar. A restoration of the Bar was completed in late 2017.

== Minor bars ==
Besides the four main bars, there are two smaller bars.

=== Fishergate Bar ===
This Bar originally dates from around 1315, when it was documented as being called Barram Fishergate. It was bricked up following riots in 1489, but was reopened in 1827 and today provides pedestrian access through the walls between the Fishergate area (actually Fawcett Street/Paragon Street) and George Street.

=== Victoria Bar ===
As the name suggests, this bar is a 19th-century addition to the walls. It was opened in 1838 to provide direct access between Nunnery Lane and Bishophill. However, during its construction the remains of an ancient gateway were found beneath it. This was probably the gateway known in the 12th century as the lounelith or secluded gateway (in comparison to Micklegate Bar or the great bar located four hundred yards away). This was a small entrance to the city which dated back to early medieval times but was blocked up later with earth and stone, possibly during the period when the walls consisted solely of a wooden palisade before they were rebuilt in stone (from around 1250).

== Posterns ==
A postern is a secondary door or gate in a fortification such as a city wall or castle curtain wall. Posterns were often located in a concealed location which allowed the occupants to come and go inconspicuously. In the event of a siege, a postern could act as a sally port, allowing defenders to make a sortie on the besiegers. Placed in a less exposed, less visible location, they were usually relatively small, and therefore easily defensible.

Fishergate Postern tower in the present day

The York City walls have many intact posterns along their length, as well as records of others that have been demolished due to the expansion of the city.

Castlegate Postern

The site of Castlegate postern is currently located under the pedestrian crossing on the B1227, Tower Street, in front of Clifford's Tower. The postern was demolished between 1826 and 1827.

Friargate Postern

Another postern that was demolished around 1840 and its location is to the northwest of St George's Field where it meets the end of the southern section of the Esplanade.

Skeldergate Postern (a.k.a. Crane Tower)

Records describe it as a narrow arch with round turrets to either side and is estimated to have been built around 1315. It was similar in appearance to the North Street Postern and had been intact until its demolition in 1808. It was located on Terry Avenue outside The Bonding Warehouse.

Red Tower

Red Tower marks an endpoint of the walls and is located on Foss Islands Road just south of its junction with Navigation Road. Records show that it was built around 1490 and is in good condition to this day.

North Street Postern Tower (a.k.a. Barker Tower)

Located on the west bank of the River Ouse on Wellington Row just to the north of Lendal Bridge. Built in the 14th century for use as a boom tower, it was restored for modern-day usage in 1930. Its original use was to have a chain secured to it and the other end attached to Lendal Tower on the opposite bank.

There was another postern very close to the North Street Postern. It was replaced by the Great North of England Railway Company for the multi-arch construction seen currently.

Lendal Tower

Located on the north bank of the River Ouse on Dame Judi Dench Walk, the tower served as the complimentary boom tower to the North Street Postern Tower and was built at the same time. It was converted in the 17th century to a water tower, though remains of the original structure can still be seen in the waterworks yard. It was restructured again in the 19th century for offices and is currently a holiday rental property.

Fishergate Postern (a.k.a. St George's Postern)

Recorded as being built in 1440, this postern is located on the corner of Fishergate and Piccadilly. It was altered in 1505 and was separated from the walls of York Castle by water. It has four floors. It is currently leased from the City Council to the Friends Of York Walls, who maintain displays of the walls within.

Layerthorpe Postern (a.k.a. Peasholme Green Postern)

This postern was located at the current junction of Peasholme Green, Layerthorpe, Foss Islands Road, and Jewbury. It was recorded as being built in the 13th century and demolished around 1829-30 during the construction of a new bridge over the River Foss.

== Towers ==
Other than the Postern Towers, the city walls have many interval towers. In 1972 the Royal Commission on the Historical Monuments of England documented all the towers of the city walls and assigned them a number. There are 39 towers in total and they vary in build type. Only a few have recorded names.

List of Towers on York City Walls
Tower Number	Name	Shape	Notes
1	Baille Hill		built in 1878 as an endpoint to the walls when the walls to Skeldergate Bridge were demolished. It is located at the junction of Cromwell Road, Skeldergate, and Bishopgate Street.
2		A semi-circular interval tower	facing Bishopsgate Street.
3	The "Bitch Daughter" or "Biche Doughter" tower		is placed in the southwest corner of the walls. Located at the junction of Bishopsgate Street and Price's Lane.
4		A semi-circular interval tower	facing Price's Lane.
5		A demi-hexagonal interval tower	facing Price's Lane
6		A rectangular interval tower	facing Nunnery Lane close to Victoria Bar.
7	Sadler Tower	a D-shaped interval tower	facing Nunnery Lane close to Victoria Bar.
8		A rectangular interval tower	facing Nunnery Lane.
9		A D-shaped interval tower	facing Nunnery Lane.
10		A rectangular interval tower	facing Nunnery Lane.
11		A semi-circular interval tower	facing Nunnery Lane close to Micklegate Bar.
12		A rectangular interval tower close to Micklegate Bar	facing Queens Street.
13	Tofts Tower		forms the northwestern corner of the walls and has a chamber inside.
14			No longer exists, but the site is recorded. It was a demi-hexagonal interval tower demolished to create an arch for the railway to run through. It is located facing Queens Street and York Station.
15		A rectangular interval tower	facing Queens Street and York Station.
16		A demi-hexagonal interval tower	located where Queens Street changes to Station Road opposite the hotel formerly known as the Royal Station Hotel.
17		A demi-hexagonal interval tower	located at the junction of Station Road and Station Rise.
18	North Street Postern Tower/Barkers Tower		
19	Lendal Tower		
20			The site of this tower is now the Lodge at the entrance to the Museum Gardens.
21			It no longer exists; it was demolished during the construction of St Leonards Place and is located where the De Gray Rooms are currently.
22		A demi-hexagonal interval tower	overlooking gardens on Gillygate.
23		A demi-hexagonal interval tower	overlooking gardens on Gillygate.
24		A demi-hexagonal interval tower	overlooking gardens on Gillygate.
25		A semi-circular interval tower	overlooking gardens on Gillygate.
26		A semi-circular interval tower	overlooking gardens on Gillygate. A 20th-century replacement for the original 14th-century tower.
27	Robin Hood Tower		Forms the northwestern corner of the walls facing Lord Mayor's Walk. It has also been known as Bawing Tower and Frost Tower.
28		A semi-circular interval tower	facing Lord Mayor's Walk.
29			This tower no longer exists, but was recorded as being here until the 19th century at least. It was also a gateway close to the Roman porta decumana site.
30			Site of semi-circular interval tower removed around 1822 facing St Maurices Road. It overlooks the remains of an east-facing Roman angular tower.
31	Harlot Hill Tower	is a semi-circular interval tower	facing the point where St Maurice's Road changes to Jewbury.
32	New Tower	is an oval tower	facing Jewbury.
33		Rectangular interval tower	facing Jewbury.
34	Layerthorpe Tower		on the junction of Jewbury, Layerthorpe, Peaseholme Green, and Foss Islands Road. It is an endpoint to the walls.
35		Rectangular interval tower	after the wall recommences at Red Tower. Faces Foss Islands Road.
36		Rectangular interval tower	facing Foss Islands Road close to Walmgate Bar.
37		Rectangular interval tower	facing Foss Islands Road close to Walmgate Bar.
38		Rectangular interval tower	facing Paragon Street after Fishergate Bar.
39		Angled tower	at the junction of Fishergate and Paragon Street.

== See also ==
- Eboracum
- Grade I listed buildings in the City of York
- History of York
- List of town walls in England and Wales
- Listed buildings in York (outside the city walls, northern part)
- Listed buildings in York (within the city walls, northern part)
- Listed buildings in York (within the city walls, southern part)
- Museum Gardens
- Siege of York

== Sources ==
- Pevsner, Nikolaus; Neave, David (1995) [1972]. Yorkshire: York and the East Riding (2nd ed.). London: Penguin Books. ISBN 978-0-14-071061-8.
- Wilson, Barbara; Mee, Frances (2005). The City Walls and Castles of York: The Pictorial Evidence. York Archaeological Trust. ISBN 978-1-874454-36-6.
- Walking the Walls: An easy stage by stage guide to York's medieval walls. Huntington, York: Village. 1985.
- Beal, Pauline (1994). Walking the Walls. Village Publishing.
- An Inventory of the Historical Monuments in the City of York, Volume II The Defences. London: Royal Commission on Historical Monuments. 1972. ISBN 0117003271.
