= John Hewley =

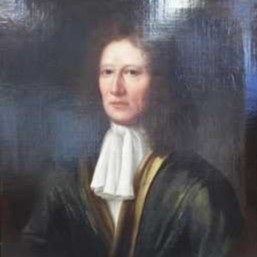
Sir John Hewley

Sir John Hewley (1619–1697) was an English magistrate and Member of Parliament for Pontefract, an early Whig. He sided with parliament against the king. After his death his widow, Sarah Hewley founded the Hewley Trust in 1705, now known as the Sarah Hewley Trust.

== Life ==
He was the son of John Hewley of Wistow, near Selby. He was admitted to Gray's Inn, 4 February 1638, and became recorder of Doncaster.

He sat in Parliament for Pontefract 1658–60, was knighted at Whitehall Palace on 30 June 1663, and sat for York in 1678, 1679, and 1681. He encouraged literary work, giving monetary support to the production of William Dugdale's Monasticon and Matthew Poole's Synopsis Criticorum.

He kept a presbyterian chaplain, who gathered a public congregation in York, for which a small chapel, cruciform in shape, was built at St Saviourgate in 1692 (registered 8 April 1693). It is now York Unitarian Chapel.

Hewley died at his country residence, Bell Hall, near York, on 24 August 1697, and was buried in St Saviour's Church, York. He married Sarah Wolrych, who survived him and set up the Lady Hewley Trust. She was buried alongside Sir John under the sanctuary steps in St Saviour's.

== Notes ==
Attribution

This article incorporates text from a publication now in the public domain: "Hewley, Sarah". Dictionary of National Biography. London: Smith, Elder & Co. 1885–1900.
