= 24 St Saviourgate =

Listed building in York, England

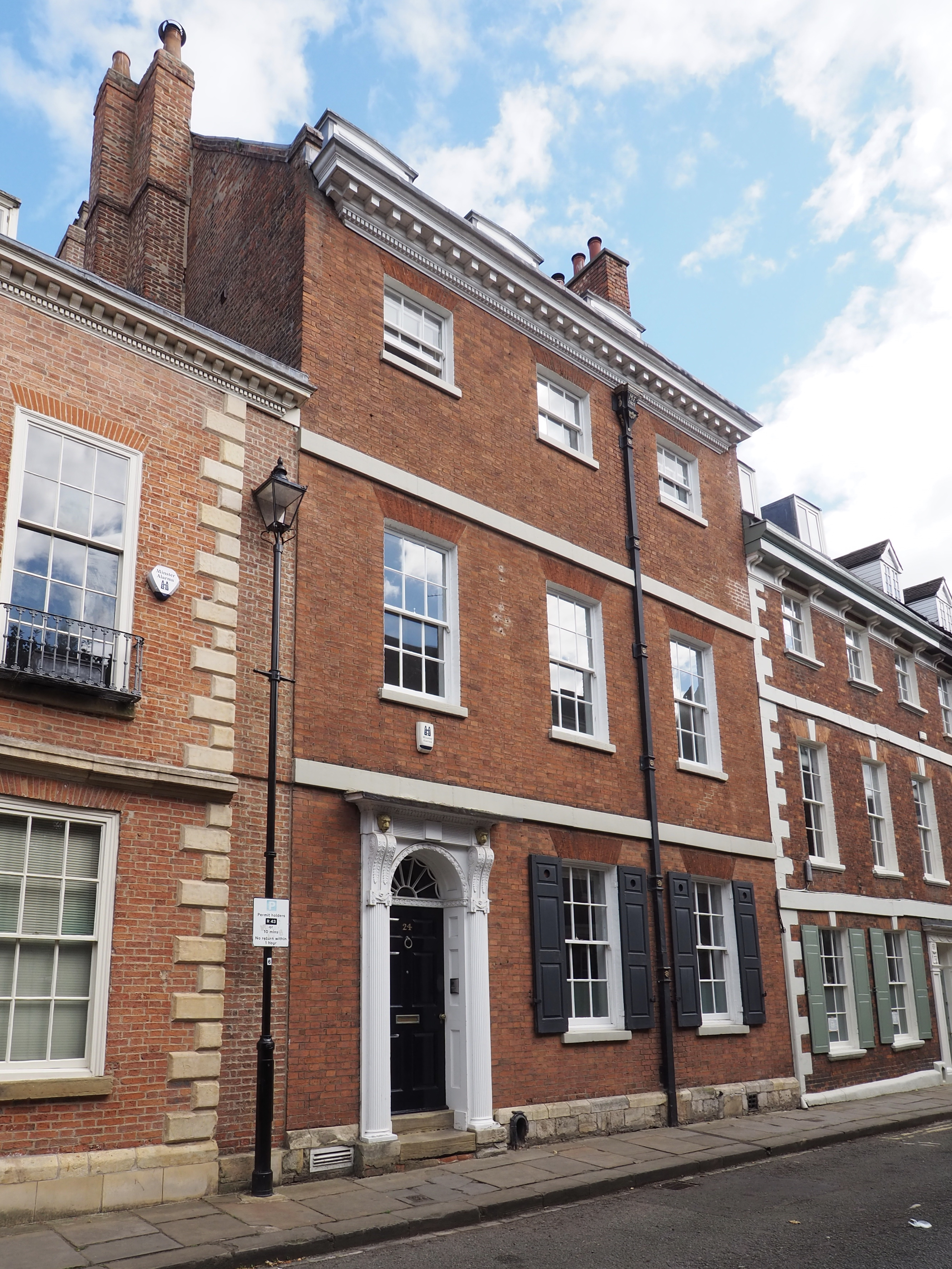
- The building in 2022
- Interactive map of the 24 St Saviourgate area

General information
- Type: House
- Location: St Saviourgate, York, England
- Coordinates: 53.9601°N 1.0773°W
- Year built: 1763; 263 years ago
- Renovated: Early 19th century (altered)
- Client: Marmaduke Fothergill (probable)

Listed Building – Grade II*
- Official name: 24, St Saviourgate
- Designated: 14 June 1954
- Reference no.: 1256698

24 St Saviourgate is a Grade II* listed house on St Saviourgate in the city of York, England. Built in 1763, it carries a dated rainwater head with the initials "MF", traditionally linked to Marmaduke Fothergill, though the attribution may be posthumous and could refer to his son or another family member. The building was altered in the early 19th century and remains a private residence. It stands between Nos. 16–22 and No. 26, also listed at Grade II*.

== History ==
Standing on St Saviourgate and built in 1763 as a house, the date, together with the initials "MF", appears on a rainwater head on the front. The traditional attribution is to Marmaduke Fothergill, though this may represent a posthumous reference, as the Reverend Marmaduke Fothergill died in 1731 and the initials could relate to his son of the same name or another family member. The front was altered in the early 19th century, with a new door‑case added to the entrance, and the rear has been largely modernised. It remains in use today as a private residence.

On 14 June 1954, No. 24 was designated a Grade II* listed building, and in 1968 the site was included within the newly established Central Historic Core conservation area. It stands between Nos. 16–22 and No. 26, all listed at Grade II*.

== Architecture ==
The front is built of orange brick on a chamfered stone base, with painted stone sills and horizontal bands, and a timber doorcase and cornice. The left side wall is of red brick. The roof is tiled, with brick copings and stacks, and has dormer windows with two lights.

The building has three storeys and an attic, with three windows across the front. The doorway is set within a decorative timber surround with fluted columns, a patterned frieze with lion‑head blocks at the corners, and a flat cornice supported on carved brackets. The door has six raised panels, and above it is a fanlight with radial glazing set over a transom carved with scrollwork, all framed by an architrave decorated with oak leaves.

The ground and first‑floor windows are 12‑pane sashes; those on the second floor are shorter six‑pane sashes. All have flat brick arches, and the ground‑floor windows retain their original panelled shutters. Brick bands mark the first and second floors. At the eaves is a dentilled and modillioned cornice, with a dated rainwater head decorated with winged cherub heads and the initials "MF".

=== Interior ===
Inside, the house follows a typical town‑house plan, with a front room, a back room, and an entrance hall leading to the staircase at the rear. A small closet wing is reached from the back rooms. On the first floor, the main front room originally ran the full width of the house but has since been divided.

The RCHME notes that the staircase is original, built without newel posts and fitted with turned balusters that have distinctive mushroom‑shaped tops. Most rooms retain plaster cornices, and in the principal front rooms these are more elaborate, with additional detailing. Some of the door and window surrounds are also decorative. The main rooms have lost their original fireplace surrounds.

== See also ==
- Grade II* listed buildings in the City of York
- Listed buildings in York (within the city walls, southern part)
