= Lady Hewley Trust =

English Christian charity

The Lady Hewley Trust, now a charity, began as Sarah, Lady Hewley's charity to support English Presbyterian, Congregationalist and Baptist ministers, at the beginning of the eighteenth century.

The trust was later at the centre of a 12-year legal suit in the nineteenth century, noted in Unitarian history, and turning on the current beliefs of ministers who were supported by its funds. While the legal judgment went against the Unitarians, the introduction of the Dissenters' Chapels Act 1844, which followed on the case, improved their position.

== Sarah, Lady Hewley ==
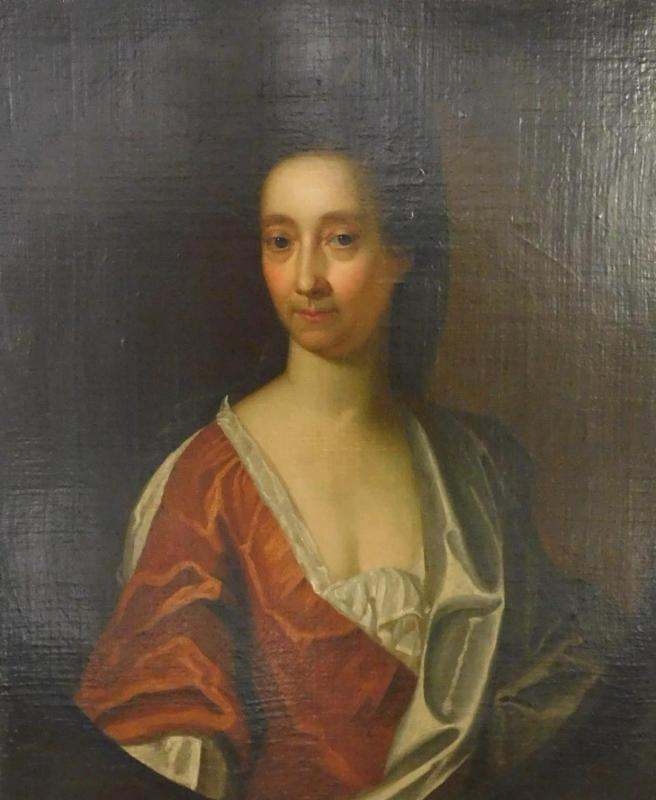
Sarah Hewley

Sarah Wolrych was born in 1627 and she had money from her mother before she married John Hewley. As his widow, Sarah spent large sums in works of charity. In 1700 she built Lady Hewley's Almshouses and funded charity schools founded at York by Archbishop John Sharp. In 1705 she created the Hewley Trust. She died in 1710. Portraits of Sir John Hewley and his wife are preserved in the vestry of St. Saviourgate Chapel.

== The trust ==
On 13 January 1704–5 Sarah, Lady Hewley conveyed to trustees a landed estate, of which the income was, after her death, to be devoted to benevolent objects, including the support of ‘poor and godly preachers for the time being of Christ's holy gospel.’ The benefactions were increased by a further deed (26 April 1707) and by her will (9 July 1707, codicil 21 August 1710). The will was contested without result. Though the trustees were all Presbyterian, grants were made to ministers of the ‘three denominations;’ in other words Congregationalists and Baptists were included.

== Unitarian influence ==
By the end of the eighteenth century all the trustees and a majority of the Presbyterian recipients were Unitarian. Independents from Manchester objected to this controlling influence, and they brought a lawsuit concerned with the enforcement of the terms of Lady Hewley's will in 1830; one of the topics in contention was the funding of Manchester Academy. The initial legal ruling sustained the view that a Trinitarian commitment was necessary, from those with benefits from the endowments. This judgment was then twice appealed, but was upheld by the Lord Chancellor in 1836; and again by the House of Lords in 1842.

The outcome was that by a judgment of the House of Lords (5 August 1842) three Congregationalists, three orthodox Presbyterians, and one Baptist were appointed trustees. The income of the trust was then £2,830.

== Dissenters' Chapels Act 1844 ==
Nonconformists Chapels Act 1844 (Note: The citation of this act by this short title was authorised by section 1 of, and the first schedule to, the Short Titles Act 1896. Due to the repeal of those provisions it is now authorised by section 19(2) of the Interpretation Act 1978.)
- Act of Parliament
- Parliament of the United Kingdom
- Long title: An Act for the Regulation of Suits relating to Meeting Houses and other Property held for religious Purposes by Persons dissenting from the United Church of England and Ireland.
- Citation: 7 & 8 Vict. c. 45
- Territorial extent: United Kingdom

Dates
- Royal assent: 19 July 1844
- Commencement: 19 July 1844 (Note: The Acts of Parliament (Commencement) Act 1793.)
- Repealed: England and Wales: 1 January 1961
Other legislation
Amended by	Statute Law Revision Act 1874 (No. 2)
Repealed by	England and Wales: Charities Act 1960

Status: Partially repealed

Text of statute as originally enacted

As a direct consequence of the legal ruling, a group including Edwin Wilkins Field pressed for legislation. The immediate purpose was to have a retrospective element attached to the date (1813) on which Unitarianism obtained legal tolerance as a belief. (See Doctrine of the Trinity Act 1813.) This aim was achieved through Parliament, rather than the courts, with the Dissenters' Chapels Act 1844 (7 & 8 Vict. c. 45), also known as the Nonconformists Chapels Act 1844 The government supported legislation, which did not reverse the original decision, in order to head off a predicted rush of litigation in hundreds of cases affected by the precedent. A figure of 25 years was established, after which the right of possession of a chapel could not be challenged on doctrinal grounds. Baron Cottenham added a clause to protect two chapels in Dublin over which litigation was already active. Despite extensive opposition from religious groups the bill passed.
