= Spen Lane =

Street in York, England

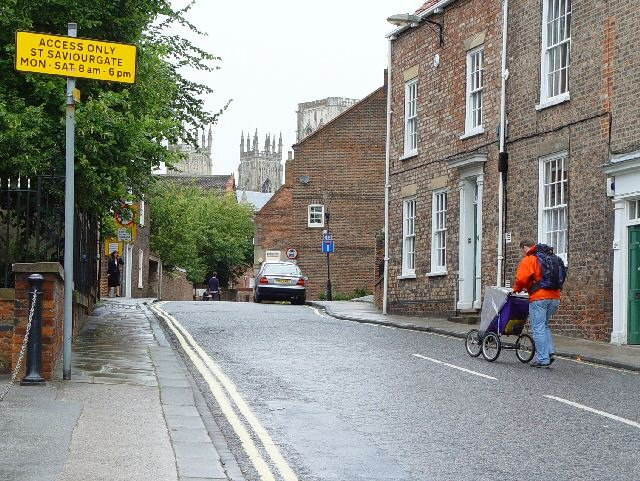
- View north-west on Spen Lane, from St Saviours Place
- Location within York
- Former names: Ispingall; Penny Lane
- Location: York, England
- Coordinates: 53.9605°N 1.0778°W
- North west end: St Andrewgate
- South east end: St Saviourgate; St Saviour's Place

Spen Lane is a street in the city centre of York, in England.

== History ==
The street was first recorded in the late 12th century, when it was known as Ispingall, referring to aspen trees in the area. By 1190, the prominent citizen, Benedict the Jew, lived on the street. In about 1260, a small house of the Friars of the Sack was built on the street, but it was demolished in 1310.

In the 19th century, the street was sometimes called Penny Lane. In the early 20th century, there was a Spiritualist National Union church on the street.

== Layout and architecture ==
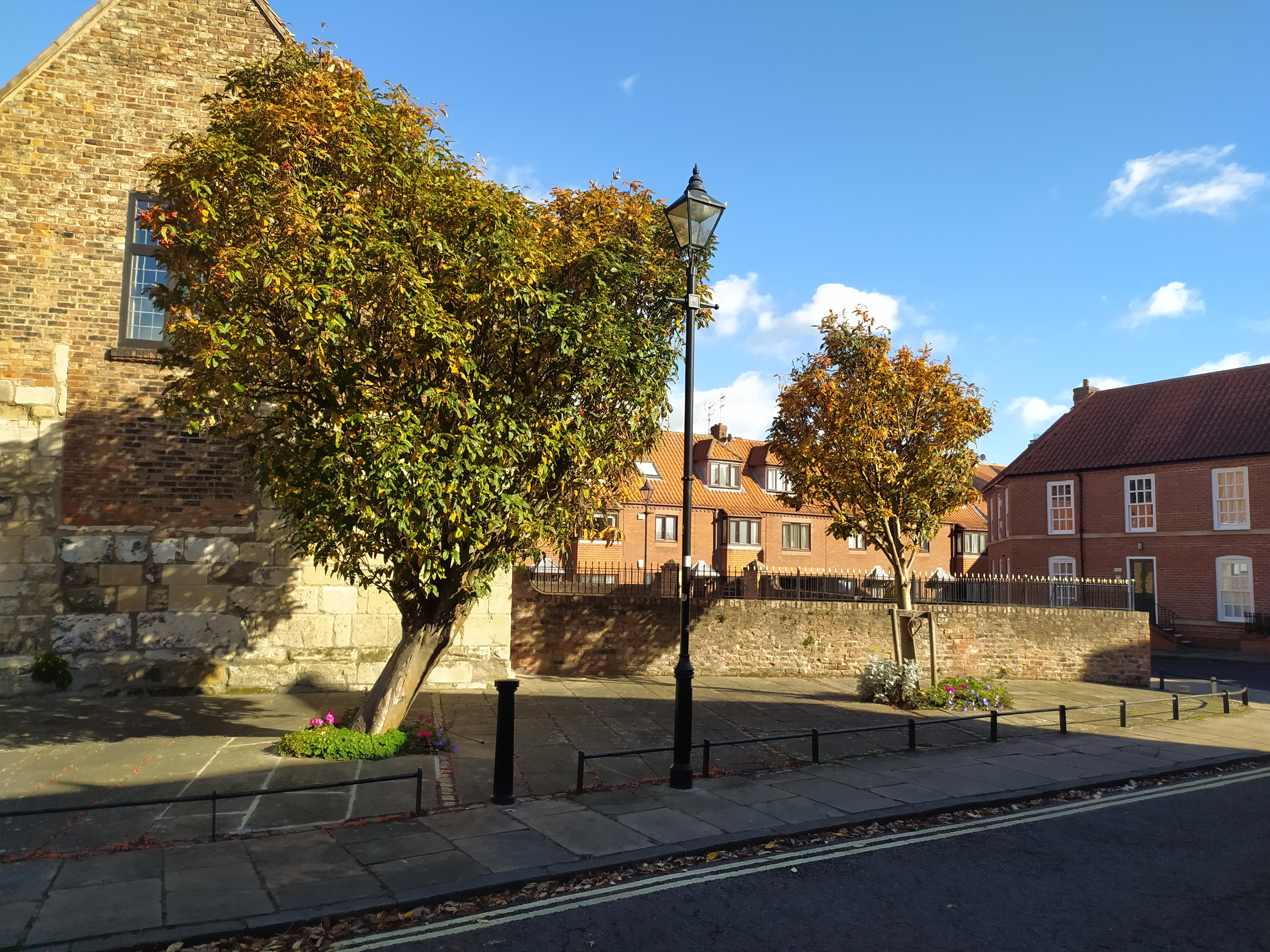
View down Spen Lane, from St Andrewgate

The street runs south-east from a junction with St Andrewgate. It briefly turns north-east as it passes around St Andrew's Church, before turning back south-east. It ends at a junction with St Saviourgate, beyond which its continuation is St Saviours Place. Several modern streets lead off it: St Andrew's Court, Kenrick Court, and St Andrew Place off the south-west side, and Penny Lane Court off its north-east side. The northern section was originally known as Little St Andrewgate.

Other than St Andrew's Church, the street's most notable building is the grade II listed St Andrew's House, built in the 18th century. There was a much-altered 17th century house at 1 and 2 Spen Lane, which was demolished in the late 20th century.
