= Sarah Hewley =

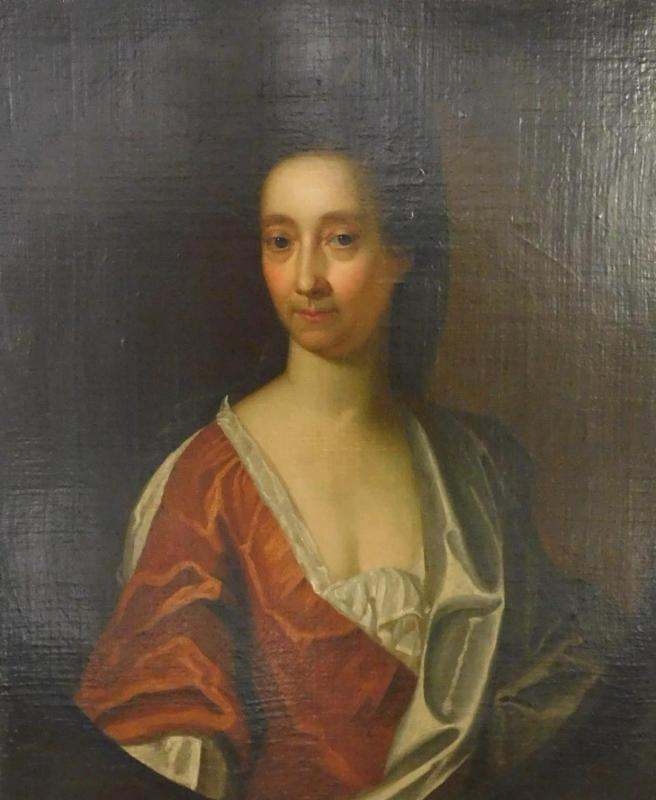
- Born: Sarah Wolrych; 1627
- Died: 23 September 1710 (aged 82–83); York
- Occupation: Philanthropist
- Known for: founding York Unitarian Chapel, almshouses and Lady Hewley Trust
- Spouse: Sir John Hewley M.P.
- Children: 2 (died young)

Sarah Hewley or Lady Sarah Hewley born Sarah Wolrych (1627 – 23 September 1710) was a British benefactor. She created what is now the Lady Hewley Trust and she is remembered in York where she created almshouses and a chapel.

== Life ==
Sarah Wolrych was born in 1627. She was the only daughter and heiress of Robert Wolrych (died 11 December 1661), bencher of Gray's Inn. Her mother, whose maiden name was Mott, had a fortune from her first husband, whose name was Tichborne.

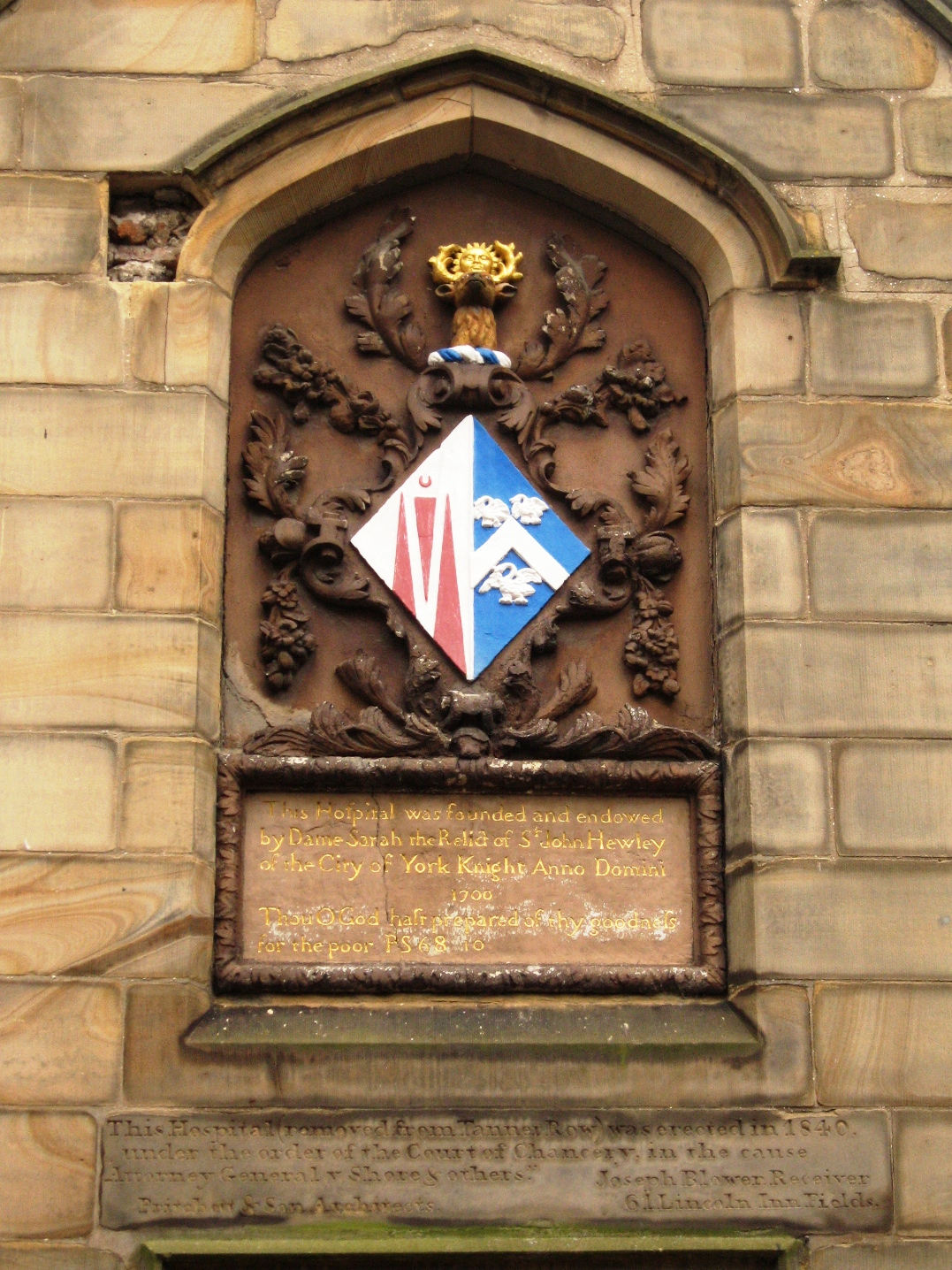
Lady Hewley's Hospital plaque

Sarah Wolrych married John Hewley, son of John Hewley of Wistow, near Selby. He became a lawyer in 1638 and rose to be a recorder. He became a member of parliament for Pontefract and York and rich. He died in 1697. As his widow, Sarah spent large sums on works of charity.

In 1700 she built and endowed an almshouse at York for ten poor women of her own religious views. The plaque on the building reads "This hospital was founded and endowed by Dame Sarah the Relict of Sir John Hewley of the City of York, Knight. Anno Domini 1700. Thou O God hast prepared of thy goddness for the poor." The Hewley Trust was formally created on the 13 January 1705 and the 26 April 1707. It was intended to be known nationally but basing itself in the north. It cared for single or widowed women who were over 55 years old in a hospital in York. She also was a major funder of what is now the York Unitarian Chapel and Lady Hewley's Almshouses which are now beside it. They were originally in Tanners Row but were forced to move when the railway needed the land in 1839. Beside the church is the entrance to the almshouses and the Warden's House which has a plaque recording Lady Hewley's bequest and her preference for Unitarians to benefit from the almshouses.

== Death and legacy ==
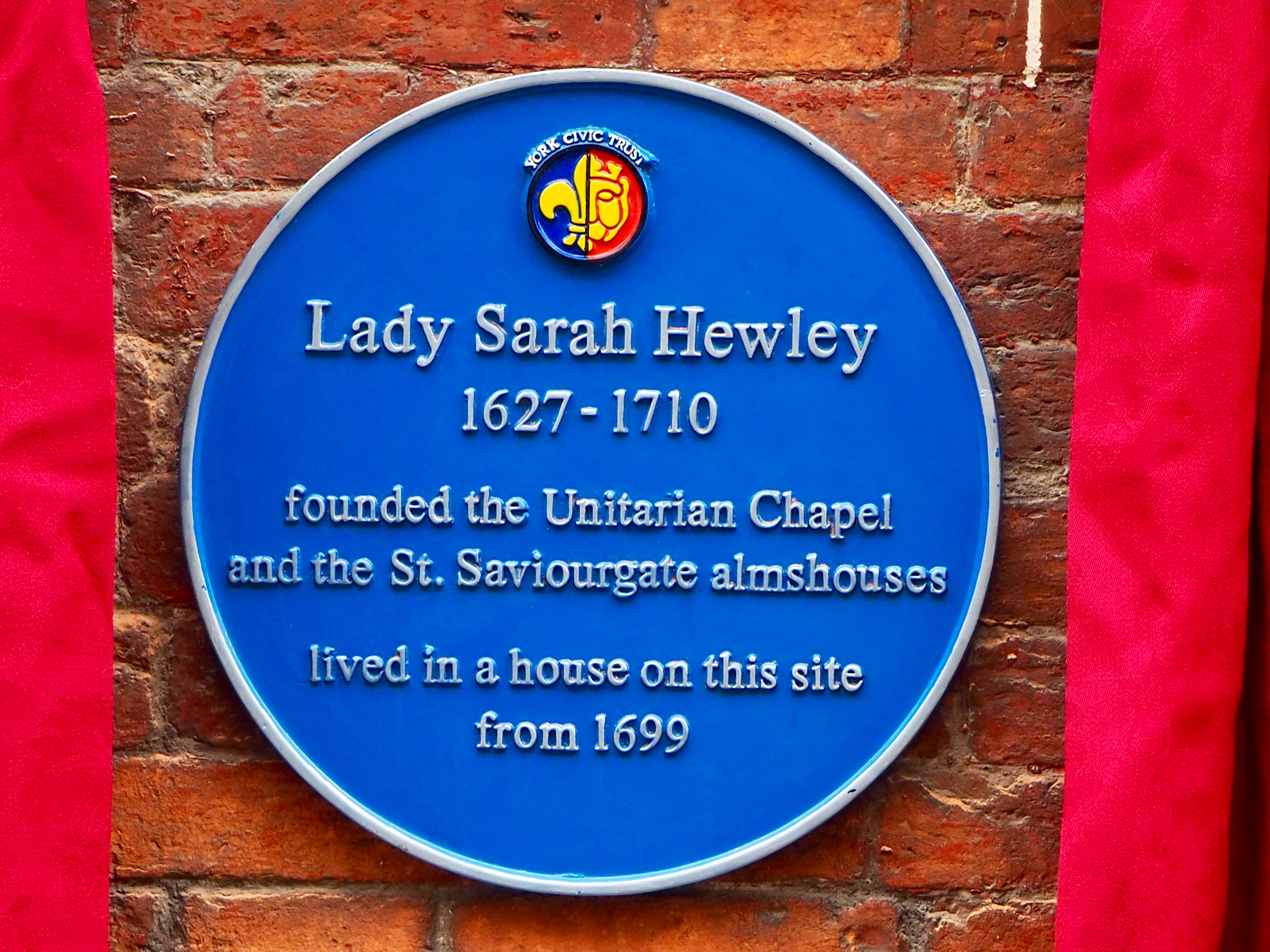
Lady Hewley's blue plaque

Hewley died in York in 1710 after instructing that her "vile body" should be disposed of cheaply and without additional ceremony. She was buried with her husband. Portraits of Sir John Hewley and his wife are preserved in the vestry of St Saviourgate Chapel. Their two children, Wolrych and John, died in infancy.

A blue plaque was added to her former house in St Saviourgate in York in 2019. It notes her contribution to the chapel and almshouses.
