= 26 St Saviourgate =

Listed building in York, England

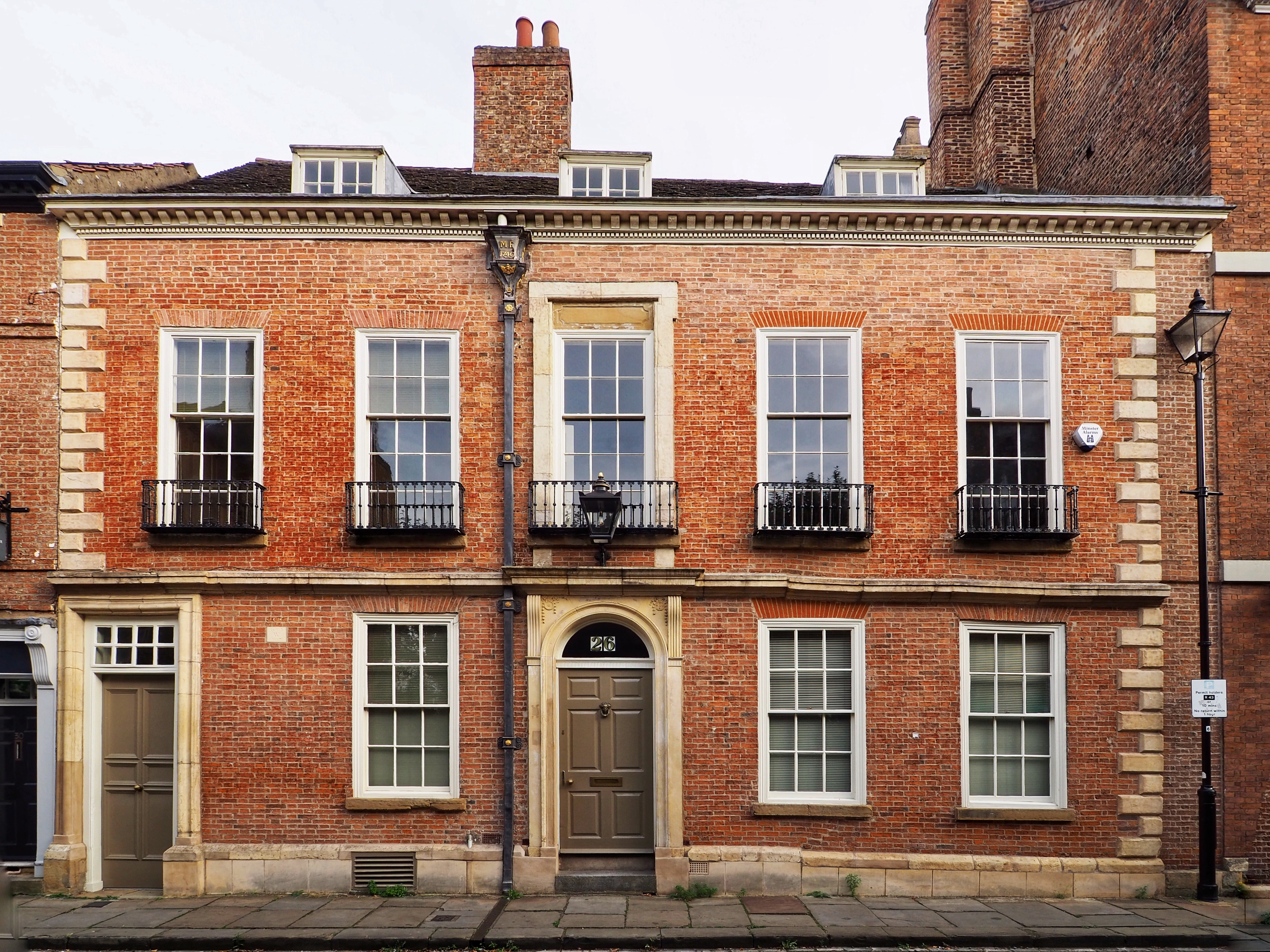
- The building in 2023
- Interactive map of the 26 St Saviourgate area

General information
- Type: House (formerly Christian mission; originally townhouse)
- Location: St Saviourgate, York, England
- Coordinates: 53.9601°N 1.0773°W
- Year built: Early 18th century
- Renovated: Early 19th and 20th century (altered)
- Client: Thomas Fothergill

Listed Building – Grade II*
- Official name: 26, St Saviourgate
- Designated: 14 June 1954
- Reference no.: 1256699

26 St Saviourgate is a Grade II* listed building on St Saviourgate in the city of York, England. Built in the early 18th century, it is recorded on John Cossins' plan of around 1727 and was described as newly built in 1736. The house was altered in the 19th and 20th centuries and was used as a Christian mission from 1942 before later returning to residential use. It stands between No. 24, also listed at Grade II*, and the terrace at Nos. 30–32A, listed at Grade II.

== History ==
Standing on St Saviourgate and built in the early 18th century as a townhouse, it appears on John Cossins' plan of York of around 1727, where a marginal drawing identifies it as the house of Thomas Fothergill. It was still described as "newly built" in Francis Drake's Eboracum of 1736. Later ownership by Marmaduke Fothergill is marked by a rainwater head dated 1740 bearing his initials. This may represent a posthumous reference, as the Reverend Marmaduke Fothergill died in 1731 and the initials could relate to his son of the same name or another family member.

From 1942, the building was used as a Christian mission for young people, established after the premises were purchased by Stanley Oglesby. It hosted regular activities throughout the week, including Bible study, prayer meetings and recreational events, and became a meeting place for local youth groups. After Oglesby's death in 1954, the religious use of the property expanded and it later served as a base for several house churches. It subsequently returned to residential use.

On 14 June 1954, No. 26 was designated a Grade II* listed building, and in 1968 the site was included within the newly established Central Historic Core conservation area. It stands between No. 24, also listed at Grade II*, and the terrace at Nos. 30–32A, listed at Grade II.

== Architecture ==
The front is finished in brick on a chamfered base, with painted stone quoins, door surrounds and window details, and a timber cornice. The rear is built of red‑brown brick. The roof is tiled with brick chimneys, and the front has three flat dormers with small two‑by‑four‑pane windows.

The building has two storeys and an attic, arranged in five bays. At the centre is a six‑panel door with a fluted bar above it and a plain fanlight, set within a round‑arched surround decorated with small carved motifs. At the left end is a passage door of six sunk panels with an eight‑pane overlight in a moulded frame. A continuous cornice runs across the ground floor and projects over both doorways.

Ground‑floor windows are 12‑pane sashes; those on the first floor are unequal 15‑pane sashes, with the centre window set in a raised surround. All have painted stone sills and painted brick arches, and the first‑floor windows retain cast‑iron guards. The eaves have a dentilled and modillioned cornice, and a rainwater head dated 1740, decorated with a winged cherub and the initials "MF", sits to the left of the centre window.

At the rear, the building rises to three storeys with two gabled sections. A round‑arched staircase window stands at the centre, and other openings have been altered.

=== Interior ===
On the ground floor, the entrance hall and passage have stone flags, and both the entrance and stair halls have fluted cornices. An elliptical arch on pilasters marks the stair hall. The front room on the left has a moulded ceiling cornice and a round‑headed basket grate set in a painted stone fireplace with a shaped frieze and a moulded shelf. Rooms to the right retain their moulded cornices.

The main staircase rises to the second floor with an open string, turned balusters and a substantial moulded handrail that ramps up to square newels. The stairwell has a dado of raised and fielded panelling. The staircase window is framed by fluted Ionic pilasters, with a triglyph frieze and a dentilled cornice above.

A secondary staircase also reaches the second floor, built with a close string, slim bulbous balusters, square newels with attached half‑balusters, and a plain handrail. On the first floor, the landing has a moulded plaster ceiling with a central rosette set within a lozenge. Upper rooms retain original fireplaces, though their grates have been altered, and some panelling, mostly with bolection mouldings.

== See also ==
- Grade II* listed buildings in the City of York
- Listed buildings in York (within the city walls, southern part)
