= 20 St Andrewgate =

Listed building in York, England

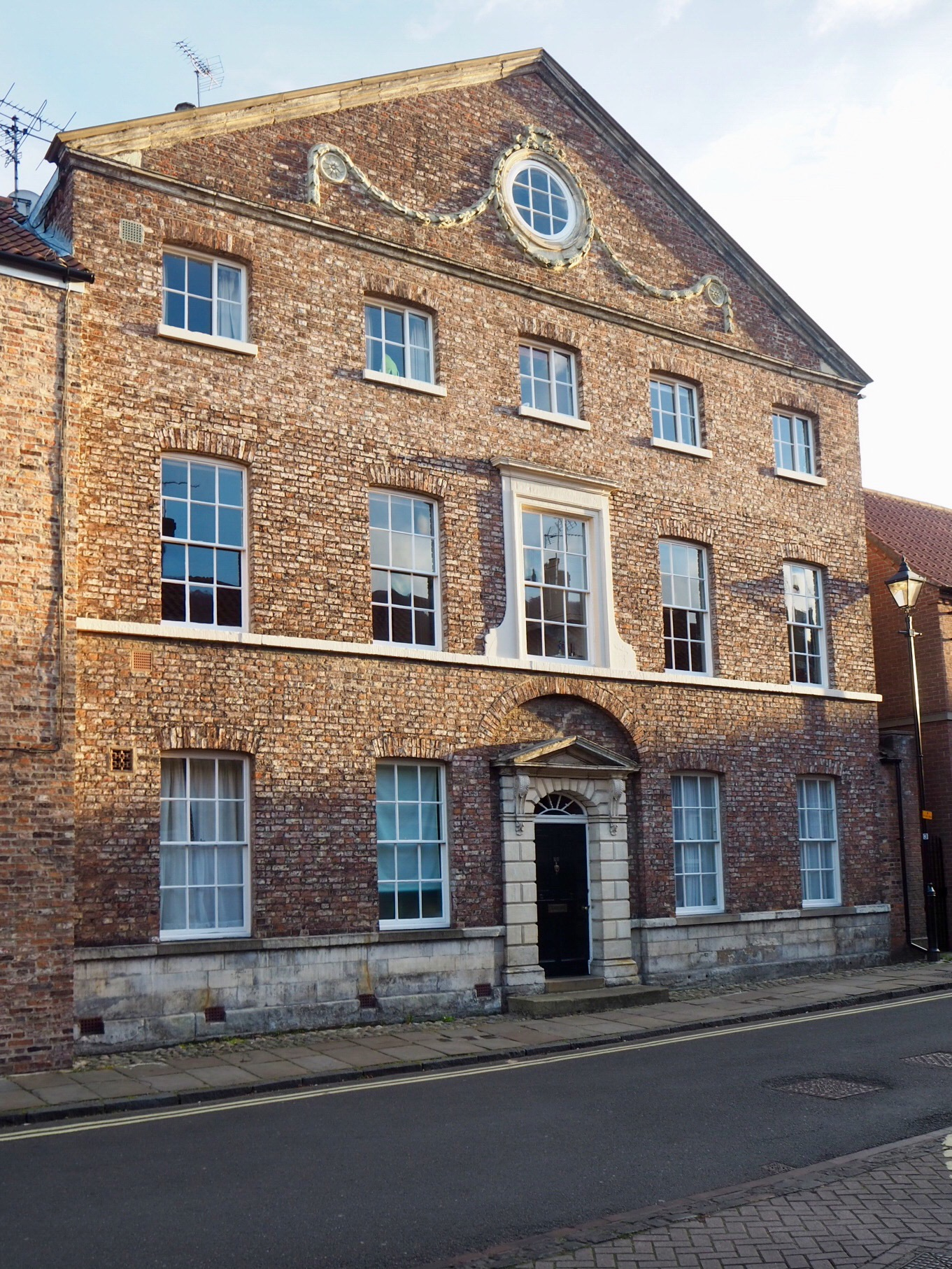
- The house in 2018
- Interactive map of the 20 St Andrewgate area

General information
- Status: Converted into flats
- Type: House (former)
- Location: St Andrewgate, York, England
- Coordinates: 53°57′36″N 1°04′41″W
- Completed: c. 1780; 246 years ago
- Renovated: 1978 (renovated, converted and wing added)

Technical details
- Floor count: 2 + attic

Design and construction
- Architect: Thomas Atkinson
- Designations

Listed Building – Grade II*
- Official name: 20, St Andrewgate
- Designated: 14 June 1954
- Reference no.: 1256788

20 St Andrewgate is a historic house in the city centre of York, England.

The house was built in about 1780. It shares similarities with other buildings by the architect Thomas Atkinson, and he is recorded as its first occupant. As a result, he is generally regarded as being the designer of the house. The house is large, with three storeys and a five-bay front to St Andrewgate. However, it was built cheaply, using common brick, with limited decoration both internally and externally. It has its original doorcase, and the first floor window above has a decorative stucco surround. In the gable is a circular window, with a surround and festoons either side. Many of the windows are original, as are various fireplaces, and both the main and secondary staircases.

In 1954, the building was Grade II* listed. In 1978, it was renovated, and converted into flats, with a new wing added at the rear.

== See also ==
- Grade II* listed buildings in the City of York
- Listed buildings in York (within the city walls, northern part)
