= York Unitarian Chapel =

Listed chapel in York, England

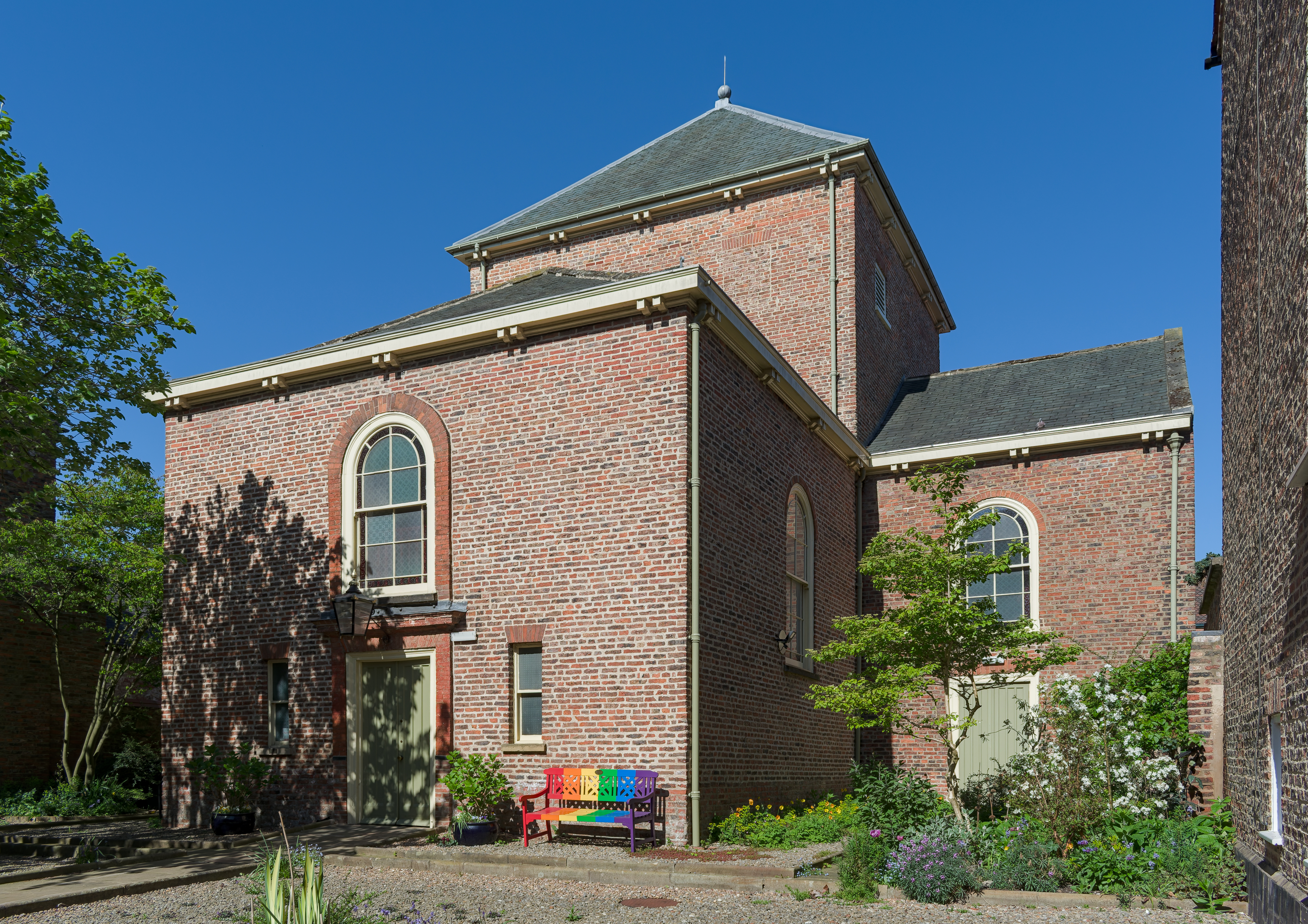
- The chapel in 2026
- York Unitarian Chapel
- 53.960300°N 1.077620°W
- OS grid reference: SE 60621 51975
- Address: St Saviourgate, York
- Country: England
- Denomination: Unitarian
- Previous denomination: Presbyterian
- Website: yorkunitarians.org.uk

Architecture
- Heritage designation: Grade II* listed
- Completed: 1692

Specifications
- Materials: Brick, stone, slate

York Unitarian Chapel is a historic chapel on St Saviourgate in the city of York, England. It is a member of the General Assembly of Unitarian and Free Christian Churches, the umbrella organisation for British Unitarians.

It is in the form of a Greek cross and was built in 1692 or earlier. It is a Grade II* listed building. It is thought to be the first brick building of any size in York with load-bearing brick walls.

A major benefactor was Lady Sarah Hewley, a Protestant dissenter and widow of Sir John Hewley, MP. Lady Hewley also founded almshouses on Tanner Row in York, which were moved by the railway in 1839 to be the present Lady Hewley's Almshouses on St Saviourgate. There are also twelve almshouses known as Colton's Hospital on Shipton Street.

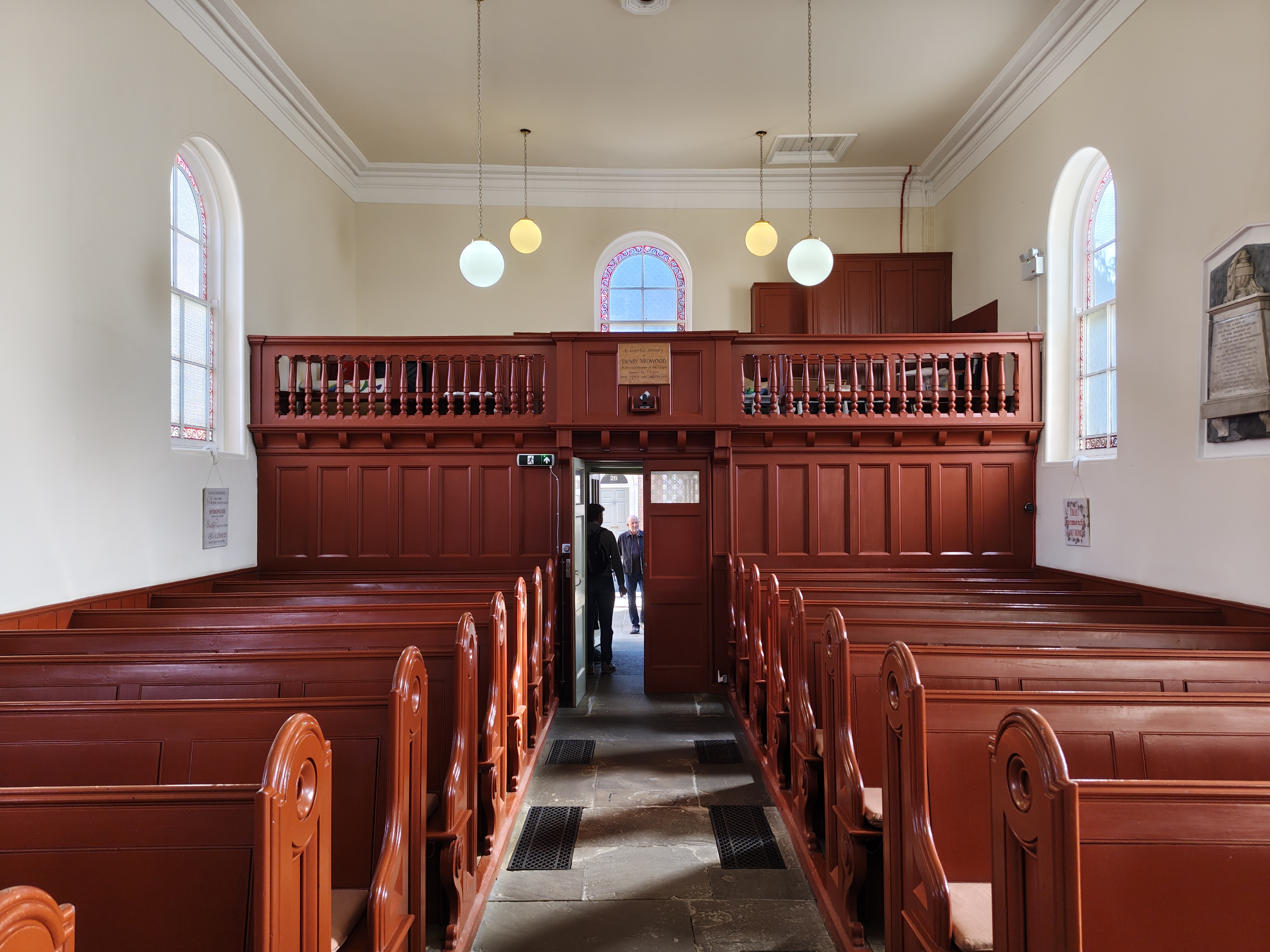
The entrance and balcony

The most famous minister of the chapel was Charles Wellbeloved, who was at first assistant to the Rev. Newcome Cappe and then minister until his death in 1858. He was involved in saving the York city walls from being used to provide building materials, ended malpractices at York County Lunatic Asylum, founded the York Mechanics' Institute, wrote a guide to York Minster and initiated an appeal after a fire destroyed a Minster screen. He was Principal of Manchester College, one of the dissenting academies for training ministers and the higher education of lay students.

== See also ==
- Grade II* listed buildings in the City of York
- Listed buildings in York (within the city walls, southern part)
