= St Andrewgate =

Street in York, England

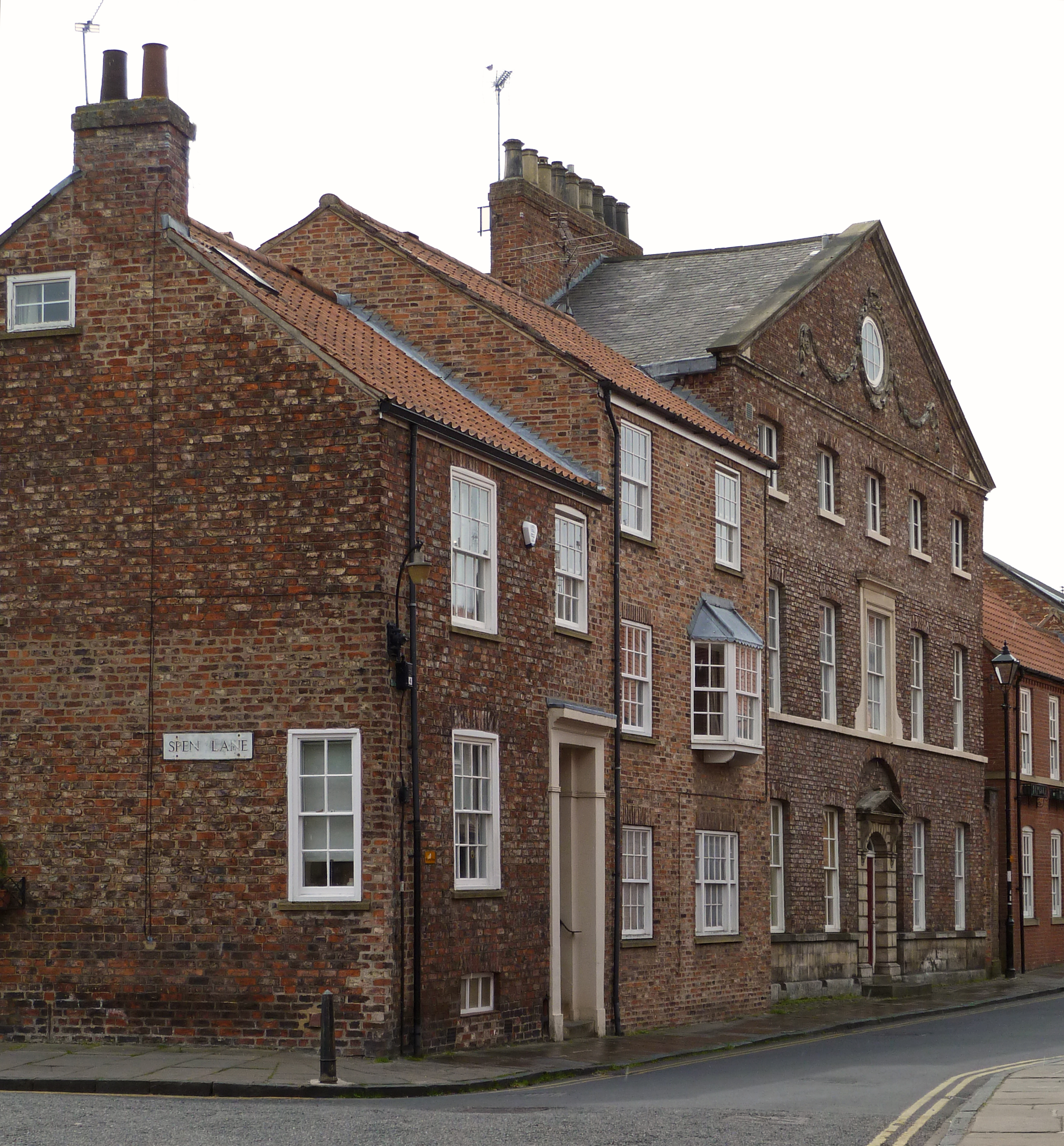
- Looking south-west along St Andrewgate, from Spen Lane
- Location within York
- Former name: Great St Andrewgate
- Location: York, England
- Coordinates: 53.9608°N 1.0788°W
- North east end: Aldwark
- Major junctions: Bedern
- South west end: King's Square

St Andrewgate is a street in the city centre of York, in England.

== History ==
The street lay immediately outside the walls of Roman Eboracum, and it may well be of Roman origin. It was first recorded in about 1200, taking its name from its church, St Andrew, St Andrewgate. At this date, part of the street may also have been known as "Ketmangergate", distinguished by an early stone house. In the Mediaeval period, it was sometimes called "Great St Andrewgate", to distinguish it from the Little St Andrewgate running around the church, now part of Spen Lane. There was a religious hospital on the street, although its exact location is not known.

In the Georgian period, numerous large merchant's houses were built on the street. The York City Commission lay on the street, and in 1821, the city's first police station was established in its building. In 1830, the entrance to the street from King's Square was widened, while in 1850, the street of Bedern was extended to reach St Andrewgate. In 1873, the Bedern National School opened on the corner of St Andrewgate and Bedern, operating until 1940. While many of the street's 17th- and 18th-century buildings survived World War II, most were demolished in the 1960s and 1970s and have been replaced with modern housing.

== Layout and architecture ==
The street runs north-east from King's Square to Aldwark. Bartle Garth and Bedern lead off its north-west side, as does the modern Granary Court, while Spen Lane and the modern St Andrew Place lead off the south-east side.

Notable buildings on the street include St Andrew's Church; the side of the Colliergate drill hall; 20 St Andrewgate, built in 1781 by Thomas Atkinson, as his own house; 42 St Andrewgate, built about 1740; 44 St Andrewgate, built as a fire station; and early 19th-century houses at 46–50 St Andrewgate.
