= St Saviour's Church, York =

Listed former church in North Yorkshire, England

St Saviour's Church, St Saviourgate, York
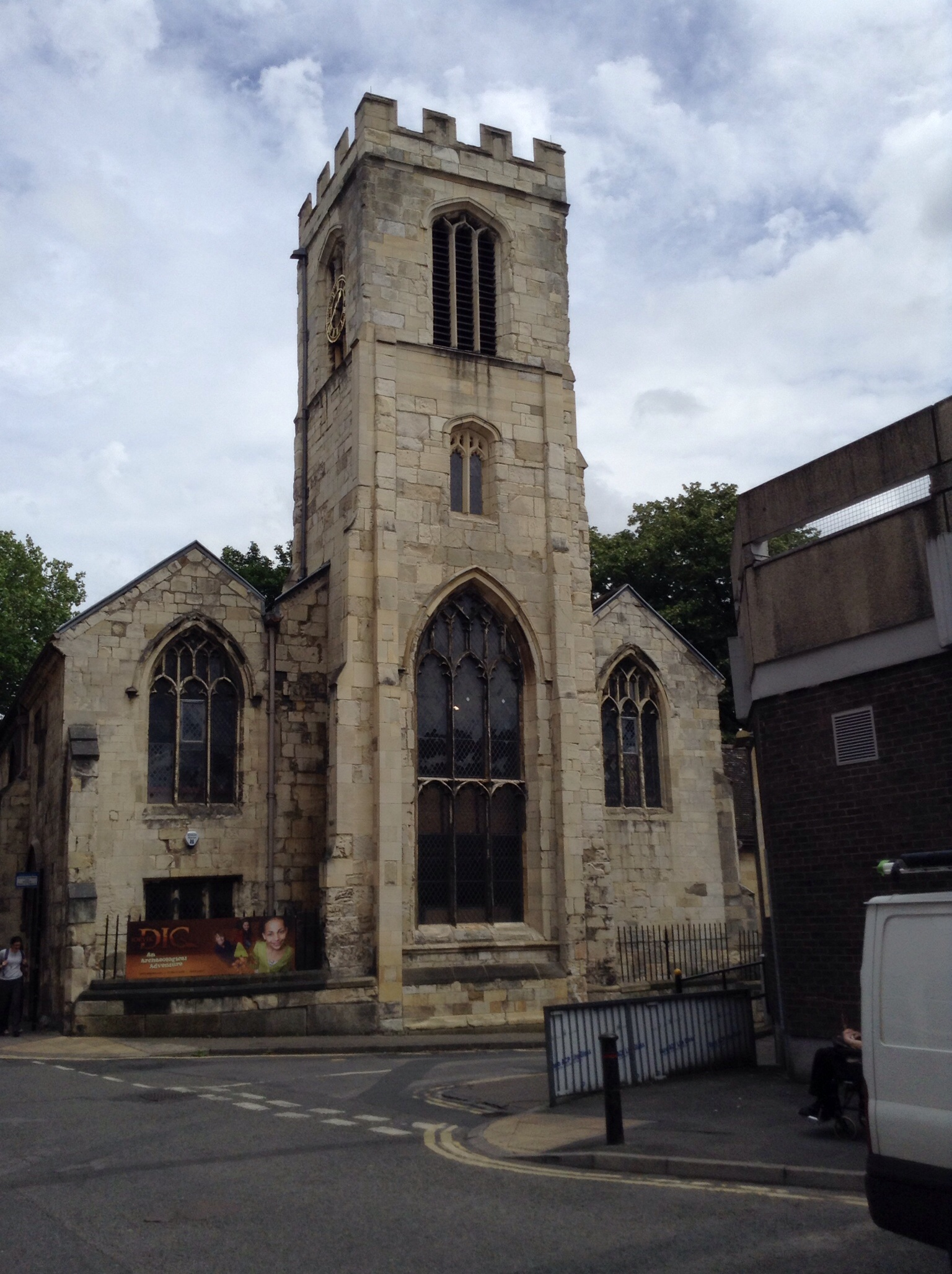
- The church in 2014
- St Saviour's Church, St Saviourgate, York
- 53°57′34.41″N 1°4′41.1″W
- OS grid reference: SE 60590 51890
- Location: St Saviourgate, York
- Country: England
- Previous denomination: Church of England
- Website: digyork.co.uk

History
- Status: Redundant
- Dedication: St Saviour

Architecture
- Functional status: Archaeology centre
- Heritage designation: Grade II* listed
- Closed: 1954 (as a church)

St Saviour's Church, also known as St Saviour in the Marsh (ecclesia sancti salvatoris in Marisco) is a Grade II* listed former parish church in the Church of England on St Saviourgate in the city of York. It is now used by the York Archaeological Trust.

== History ==
The church was founded in the 11th century but the current building dates from the 15th century. The parishes of St John, Hungate, and St Andrew, St Andrewgate were united with St Saviour's in 1586.

The north and south aisles were rebuilt between 1844 and 1845 by Richard Hey Sharp.

Another restoration was undertaken in 1871 when the roofs were painted light buff, ornamented with blue, crimson and gold. The pews and west gallery were re-stained and varnished. The old reredos was replaced with a new one made by T. Gibson Hartley. A brass corona was suspended in the chancel, and the nave fitted with brass standards. The piers and arches of the arcades were stripped of whitewash, and the stonework was redressed.

The vestry was added on the south side in 1878 by Walter Green Penty to replace the old vestry on the east side.

The church was declared redundant in 1954, and the parish united with All Saints' Pavement.

It is now used by the York Archaeological Trust.

== Organ ==
An organ was provided by Mr Ward of York in 1824 and improved by the same builder in 1845. A new organ was installed by Harrison and Harrison in 1914. A specification of the organ can be found on the National Pipe Organ Register. In 1952 this organ was transferred to St Stephen's Church, Acomb, where it was subsequently destroyed by fire.

Thomas Hopkins, brother of Edward John Hopkins, was organist for many years from the 1860s until his death in 1893.

== See also ==
- Grade II* listed buildings in the City of York
- Listed buildings in York (within the city walls, southern part)
