= 16–22 St Saviourgate =

Historic terrace in York, England

Coordinates: 53.9599°N 1.0776°W

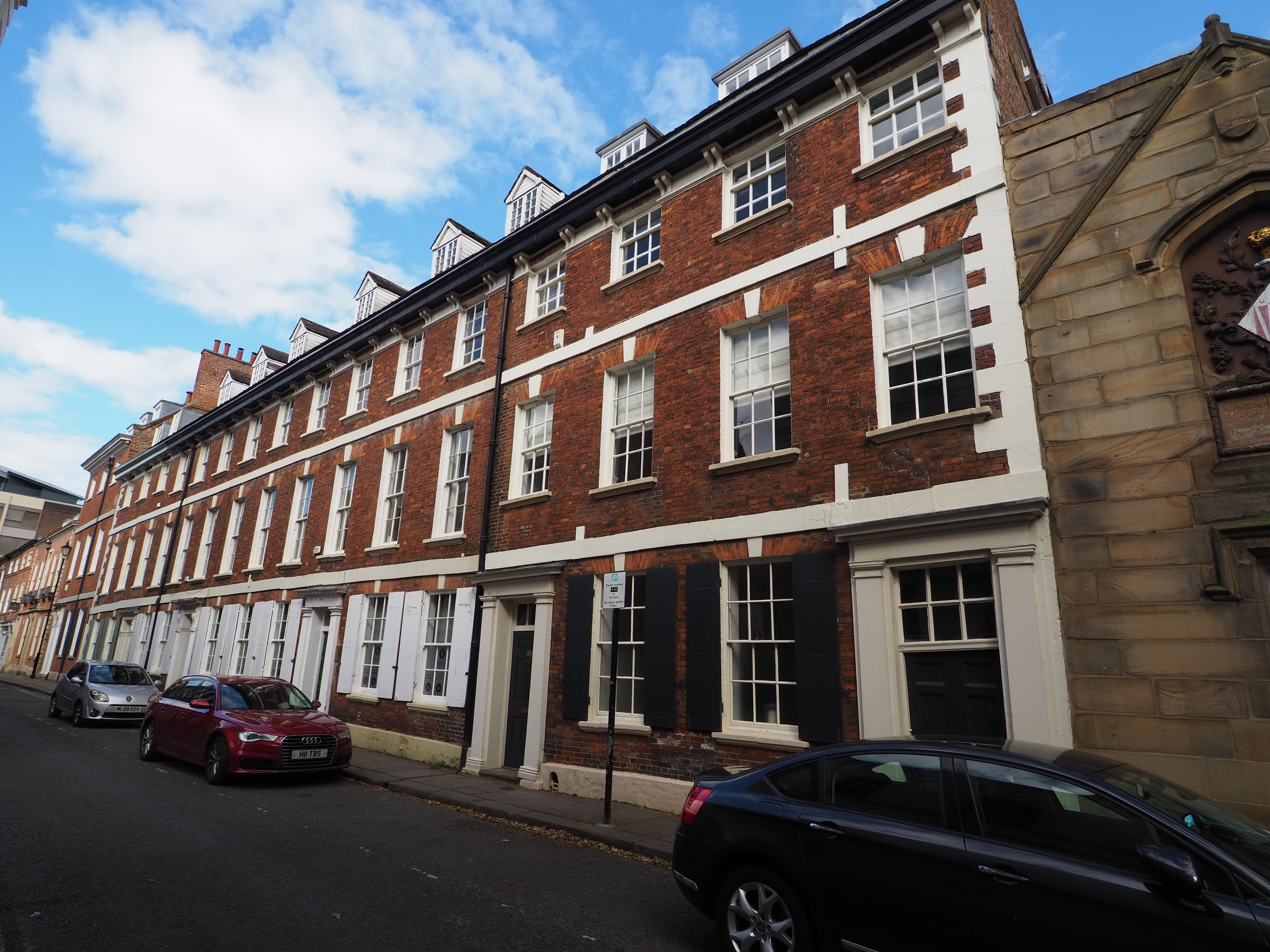
The terrace, in 2022

16–22 St Saviourgate is a historic terrace in the city centre of York, in England.

The terrace of four houses was built in about 1740 on the south-east side of St Saviourgate. It was a high-status development, and was drawn by Nathaniel Buck in 1743, while an engraving of the terrace from 1745 also survives. Nikolaus Pevsner described it as "handsome". The houses are of varying size: 18 and 22 are three bays wide at the front, 16 is four bays wide, and 20 is six bays wide. 18 and 20 have L-shaped floor plans, although one ground floor front room of 20 St Saviourgate has more recently been incorporated into number 18. The terrace was grade II* listed in 1954.

The terrace is built of orange brick with a painted stone plinth, quoins, bands and dressings, and a timber cornice and doorcases. The roof has two peaks with a valley hidden by a parapet; the front part of the roof is tiled, and the rear has pantiles. The building is three storeys high with an attic, and has five doorways at the front, the rightmost leading to a through passage. The doors and doorcases are early and variously have columns or pilasters. Most of the windows are sashes, while the dormer windows in the attic are casements. The ground floor windows have shutters.

Inside number 16, there is stone flagging in the entrance hall, and dado panelling. The front ground floor room has original panelling, fireplace, frieze and cupboard doors, and the first floor rooms also have original panelling and plasterwork. Number 18 retains its original staircase and has extensive original woodwork and plasterwork. Number 22 has original cornices in many rooms, and original fireplaces and cupboard doors in the second floor and attic front rooms.

== See also ==
- Grade II* listed buildings in the City of York
