= Lady Hewley's Almshouses =

Listed building in York, England

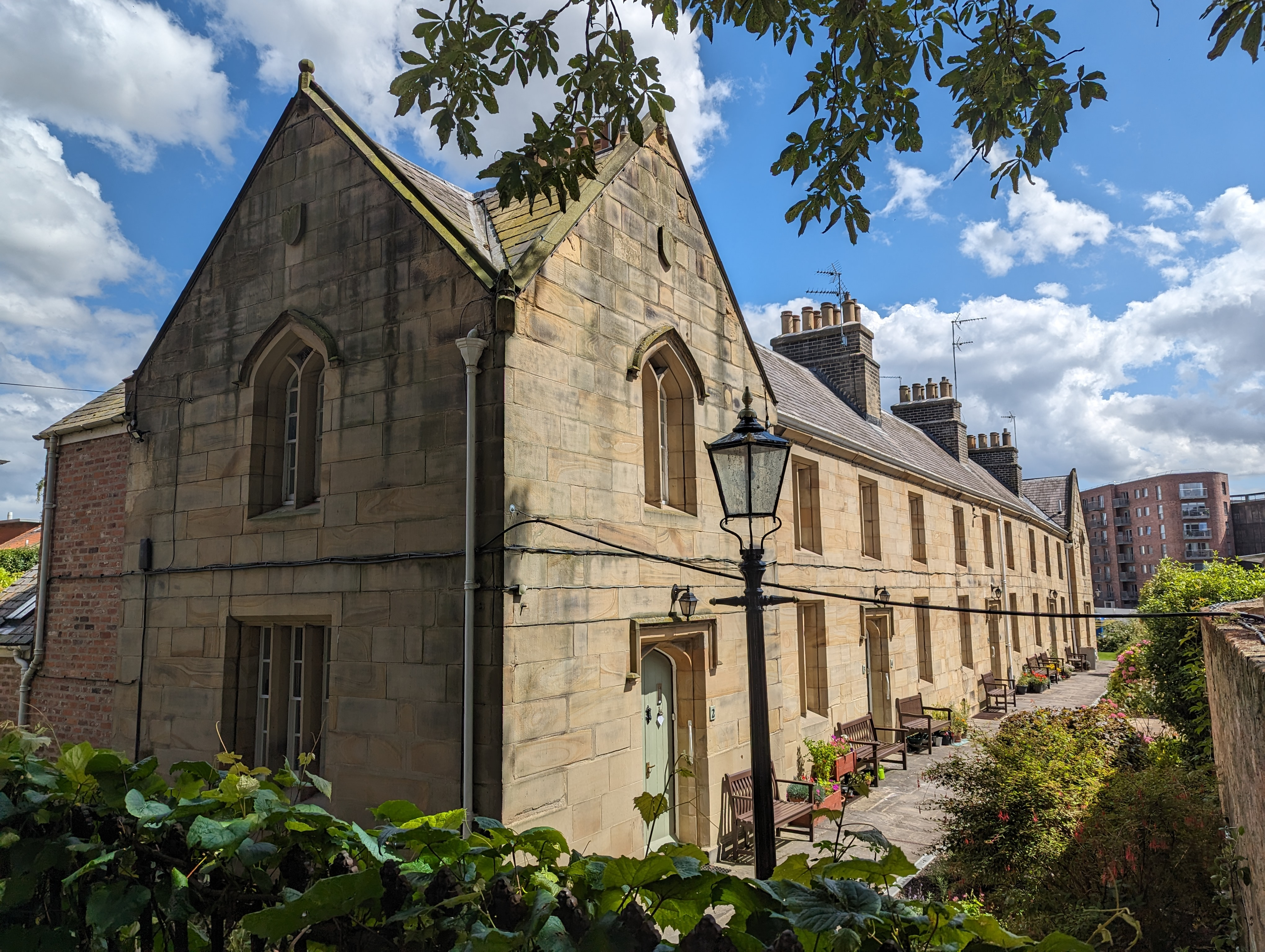
- The almshouses in 2023

- Location within York City Centre

General information
- Type: Almshouses
- Architectural style: Tudor Revival
- Location: St Saviourgate, York, England
- Coordinates: 53.9595°N 1.0772°W
- Year built: 1840
- Renovated: 20th century (modernised)

Design and construction
- Architect: James Pigott Pritchett

Website
- Official website

Listed Building – Grade II
- Official name: Lady Hewley's Almshouses numbers 2–10 (consecutive) and number 8A
- Designated: 14 June 1954
- Reference no.: 1256708

Listed Building – Grade II
- Official name: Lady Hewley's Almshouses
- Designated: 14 June 1954
- Reference no.: 1256696

Lady Hewley's Almshouses are a historic building in the city centre of York, England.

Sarah Hewley founded almshouses on Tanner Row in 1700, run by the Lady Hewley Trust. These were demolished to allow the construction of York's original railway station, and a replacement building on St Saviourgate was completed in 1840. The construction cost £1,711. The buildings are still in use as almshouses, and are still run by the same trust.

The building was designed by James Pigott Pritchett, in a Tudor Revival style. The building formerly had nine apartments and a chapel, but in 1975, the chapel was converted into an additional apartment. The front of the almshouses is of stone, and the rear of brick. The building has two storeys, with a cellar. Its main part has nine windows on each floor, and there are wings at either end. The front has three entrance doors, while there are two doors in the right-hand facade, which overlooks Stonebow. Inside, movable panels partition the entrance halls. The original kitchen ranges survive, as do the first floor fireplaces, although these are now blocked.

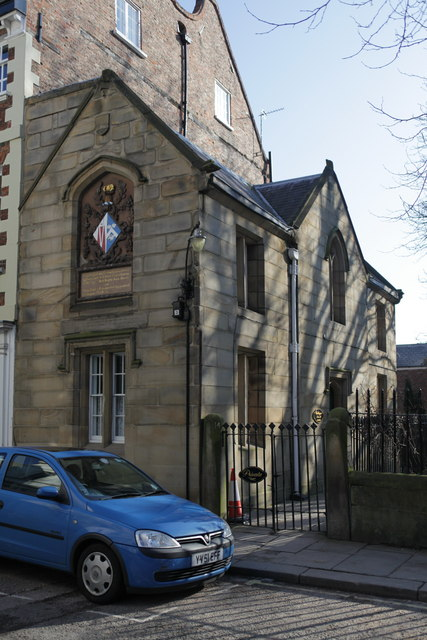
The warden's house

The warden's house has two storeys and a three-bay front, and is built of stone. In the 20th century, a single-storey extension was added to the right of the building. There is a tablet in the end wall, moved from the original building, which records its foundation. The buildings were Grade II listed in 1954; the gate piers and railings also form part of the listing.

== See also ==
- Listed buildings in York (within the city walls, southern part)
