= St Andrew's Church, York =

Listed church in England

Coordinates: 53°57′39″N 1°04′42″W

St Andrew's Church
- St Andrew's Evangelical Church
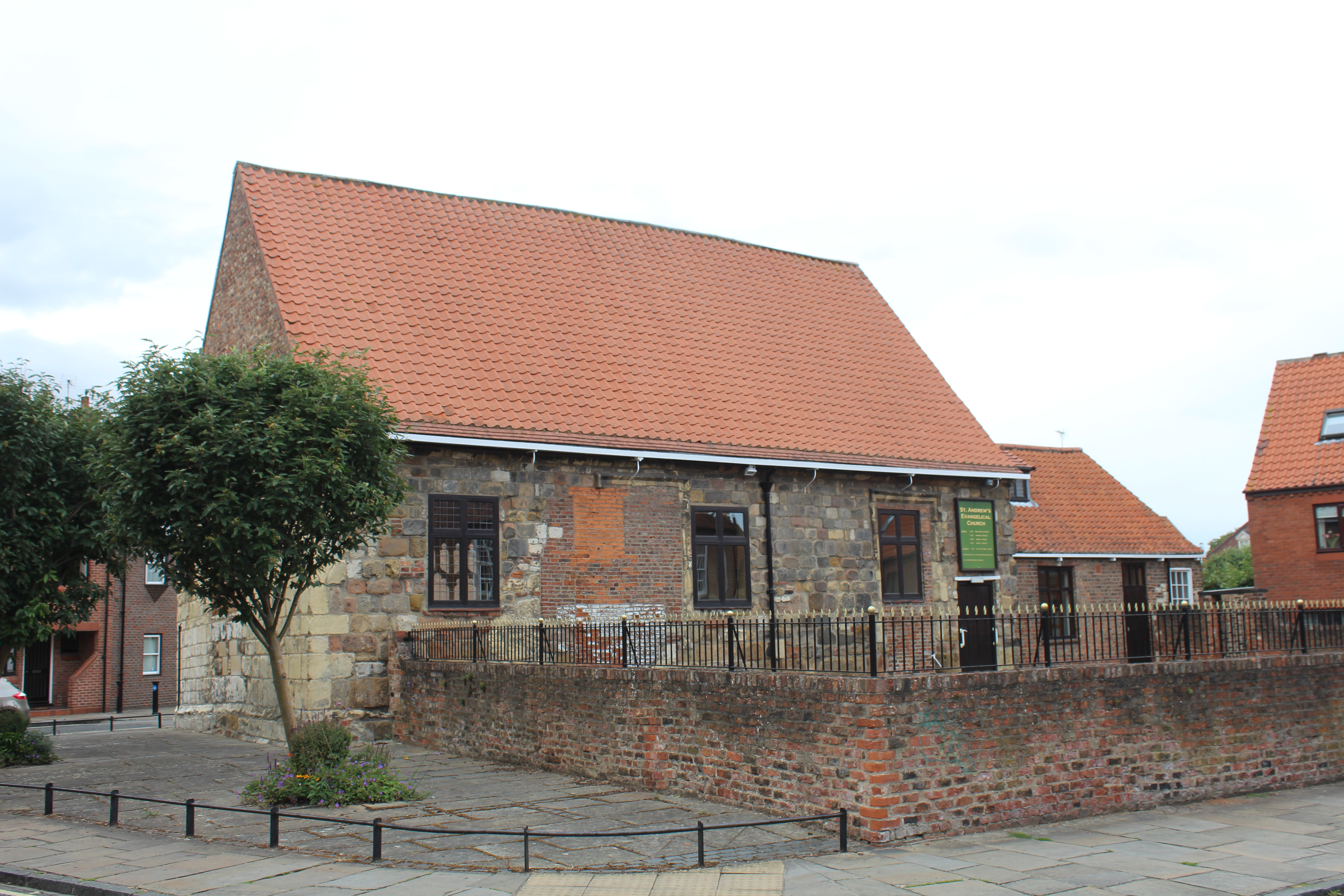
- The church in 2018, seen from Spen Lane
- St Andrew's Church
- OS grid reference: SE 60567 52034
- Address: St Andrewgate, York
- Country: England
- Denomination: Christian Brethren
- Website: standrewschurchyork.org.uk

Architecture
- Heritage designation: Grade II* listed
- Years built: 1392 (chancel); 15th century (nave)

Specifications
- Materials: Magnesian Limestone, gritstone, brick

St Andrew's Church is a Grade II* listed building on St Andrewgate in the city centre of York, England.

A church of St Andrew was mentioned in the Domesday Book, and there is a definite mention of a church on the current site in 1194. It was always a small church, and from at least 1331 until 1443, it was dependent on St Martin, Coney Street. The oldest surviving part of the current building is the chancel, completed in 1392 by Hugh Grantham, while the nave was built in the 15th century. The church was closed in 1559, and in 1586, the parish was merged with that of St Saviour, St Saviourgate.

Location of the church in York city centre

The church building had a wide variety of uses over the next few centuries. At the start of the 18th century, it was claimed to be serving as both a stable and a brothel. From about 1730, it was St Peter's School, and then from 1823 it was the infant section of the school. By this time, the chancel was a ruin, but by 1850 it was rebuilt as a cottage.

By 1956, the building had been converted back into a church, and since then, it has been used by an independent Christian Brethren congregation. Most of the medieval walls survive, consisting of a mixture of Magnesian Limestone, reused Roman gritstone blocks, and brick infill. The chancel has one original window, and the nave has two. The chancel arch survived, blocked, and there is the lowest stage of a wooden bell turret, now inside the roof.

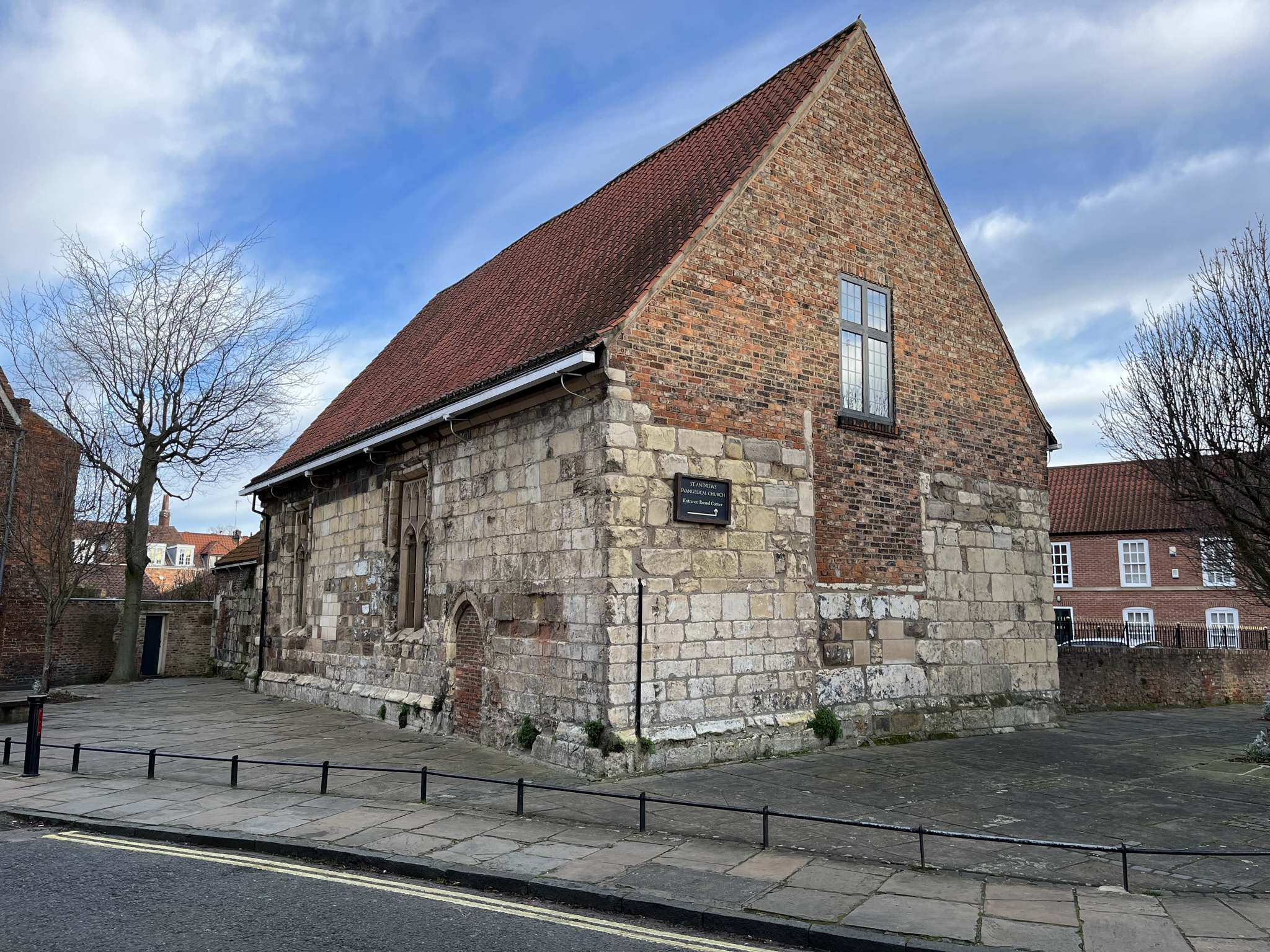
The rear of the building

== See also ==
- Grade II* listed buildings in the City of York
- Listed buildings in York (within the city walls, northern part)
