= Marmaduke Fothergill =

The Reverend Marmaduke Fothergill (1652 – 1731) was a Yorkshire clergyman, a scholar of Christian liturgy and collector of books. His donated collection is held as the Fothergill Collection at York Minster Library. It includes some titles which were previously in the library of John Price (Pricaeus).

Fothergill grew up in York as the son of a dyer and attended St. Peter's School and St Mary Magdalene College, Cambridge. After serving as for some years as vicar of Skipwith, he resigned following the Glorious Revolution after feeling that he could not swear an oath of allegiance to William III, becoming one of what is called a nonjuror. Living thereafter on his personal income, he then lived in Pontefract, married and had two children (one named for his father), and donated money to fund education in the town, before according to one source being "driven from thence to seek a sanctuary in Westminster by a furious persecution raised against him by a hot-headed neighbouring Justice of the Peace." He spent the rest of his life in Westminster, where he died. His will offered his library as first choice to his former parish of Skipwith, who turned it down due to lack of capability to establish a library.

The History of the Worthies of England describes him as a "pious and learned but eccentric divine".
