= St Saviourgate =

Street in York, England

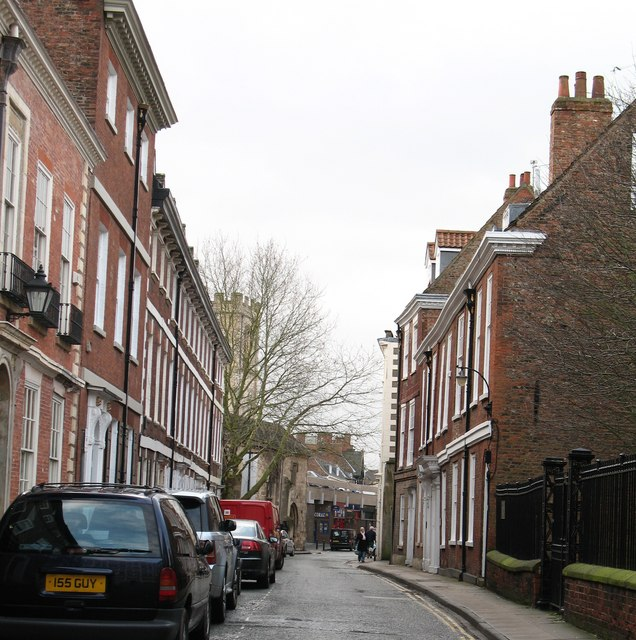
- View along St Saviourgate
- Location within York
- Former name: Ketmongergate
- Location: York, England
- Postal code: YO1
- Coordinates: 53.9597°N 1.0780°W
- North east end: Spen Lane; St Saviour's Place
- South west end: Colliergate; Whip-Ma-Whop-Ma-Gate

St Saviourgate is a historic street in the city of York, England. St Saviour's Church was founded here in the 11th century, and the street was first mentioned in 1175, as "Ketmongergate", street of the flesh sellers.

== History ==
The medieval parish church of St Saviour stands on the street

The area in which the street runs lay just outside the city walls of Roman Eboracum, north of a marshy zone around the River Foss. When foundations for new houses were dug here in the 17th century, large quantities of animal horns were discovered, indicating the site of a Roman temple, located near the palace.

The street was first recorded in 1175, when it was known as "Ketmongergate", meaning the street of the flesh sellers. St Saviour's Church was founded in the 11th century, and by 1368 it had given its name to the street. The present building dates from the 15th century and was partly rebuilt and extended in the 19th century. In the 15th century, a statue of Ebraucus, the legendary founder of the city, stood at the junction with Colliergate and served as a boundary marker; it may have been a reused Roman statue.

The street later became a centre for nonconformism in the city. The York Unitarian Chapel was built in 1693, the Congregationalist Salem Chapel in 1839, and the Central Methodist Church in 1840. Much of the rest of the street was rebuilt in the 18th century, and in 1736 Francis Drake described it as "one of the neatest and best-built streets in the city". The street was widened in 1777. In 1963, the Salem Chapel was demolished to make way for an office block.

== Architecture and layout ==
The street runs from the junction of Colliergate and Whip-Ma-Whop-Ma-Gate, north-east to the junction of Spen Lane and St Saviour's Place. Historically, St Saviour's Place was regarded as part of the street. Hungate once led off the south side, but after the construction of Stonebow, the Stonebow House office block was built across the line of the route and blocked it.

Notable buildings on the north-west side include the Methodist and Unitarian churches; a masonic hall originally built as the city's Mechanics' Institute; 18th-century houses at No. 27, Nos. 29 and 31, and Nos. 33 and 35; and an early Victorian range at Nos. 1–7, formerly a department store.

On the south-east side are the rear of Stonebow House, described by Nikolaus Pevsner as "disastrous"; St Saviour's Church, now housing the Jorvik DIG centre; Lady Hewley's Almshouses; the terrace at Nos. 16–22, built around 1740; further 18th-century houses at No. 24, No. 26, Nos. 30, 32 and 32A; and No. 34, which has 15th-century origins.
