= Listed buildings in York (within the city walls, southern part) =

York is a city in the City of York district, within the ceremonial county of North Yorkshire, England. It contains 65 Grade I, 161 Grade II*, and 1,004 Grade II listed buildings recorded in the National Heritage List for England.

This list is based on information retrieved from Historic England.

Because York has a large number of listed buildings, the subject is divided into geographically defined lists. This list covers all listed buildings inside the city walls on both sides of the River Ouse, south of Coppergate, including Cliffords Tower and York Castle.

== Key ==
Grade	Criteria
I	Buildings that are of exceptional interest
II*	Particularly important buildings of more than special interest
II	Buildings that are of special interest

== Buildings ==
Name	Grade	Location	Type	Completed (Note: The date given is the date used by Historic England as significant for the initial building or that of an important part in the structure's description.)	Date designated	Grid ref. (Note: The grid reference is based on the British national grid reference system, sometimes known as OSGB36, used by the Ordnance Survey.) Geo-coordinates	Entry number (Note: The "List Entry Number" is a unique number assigned to each listed building and scheduled monument by Historic England.)	Image	Wikidata
Church of St Mary Bishophill Junior	I	Bishophill Junior	Church	10th century	14 June 1954	SE5999651474; 53°57′21″N 1°05′14″W	1259548	Church of St Mary Bishophill Junior More images	Q514750
Church of St Martin Cum Gregory	I	Micklegate	Church	11th century	14 June 1954	SE6000551609; 53°57′26″N 1°05′13″W	1257277	Church of St Martin Cum Gregory More images	Q17530600
Church of Holy Trinity and wall attached to south east	I	Micklegate	Church	Early 12th century	14 June 1954	SE5988951547; 53°57′24″N 1°05′20″W	1257274	Church of Holy Trinity and wall attached to south east More images	Q17530596
Former Church of St John the Evangelist	II*	Micklegate	Church	Early 12th century	14 June 1954	SE6011251652; 53°57′27″N 1°05′07″W	1257279	Former Church of St John the Evangelist More images	Q17549679
Church of All Saints with Anchorage attached	I	North Street	Church	12th century	14 June 1954	SE6005351758; 53°57′30″N 1°05′11″W	1257067	Church of All Saints with Anchorage attached More images	Q2647818
St Margaret's Church	I	Walmgate	Church	Late 12th century	14 June 1954	SE6095251566; 53°57′24″N 1°04′21″W	1256319	St Margaret's Church More images	Q17530536
Clifford's Tower	I	Castle Precinct	Keep	1245–1272	14 June 1954	SE6046351467; 53°57′21″N 1°04′48″W	1259325	Clifford's Tower More images	Q113551546
9 Tower Place	II*		Tower	c. 1250	14 June 1954	SE6036951390; 53°57′18″N 1°04′53″W	1256415	9 Tower Place More images	Q17549260
Curtain Wall	I	Castle Precinct	Wall	c. 1250; 17th–19th century (rebuilt)	14 June 1954	SE6057751374; 53°57′18″N 1°04′42″W	1259329	Curtain Wall More images	Q17530656
City Wall from Baile Hill to Barker Tower, including Barker Tower and North Street Postern, Victoria Bar and Micklegate Bar	I	North Street	Wall	1250–1260 and 1330–1340	14 June 1954	SE5968351630; 53°57′26″N 1°05′31″W	1259262	City Wall from Baile Hill to Barker Tower, including Barker Tower and North Street Postern, Victoria Bar and Micklegate Bar More images	Q17530640
City Walls attached to Tower Place	I	City Walls	Wall	Late 13th century (probable)	24 June 1983	SE6040351412; 53°57′19″N 1°04′52″W	1259260	City Walls attached to Tower Place More images	Q98826030
Retaining wall and steps on north east side of South Esplanade	II		Wall	Late 13th century and later	4 February 1994	SE6031951477; 53°57′21″N 1°04′56″W	1256612	Retaining wall and steps on north east side of South Esplanade More images	Q26548094
City Wall from the Red Tower to Fishergate Postern Tower	I	City Walls	Wall	Mid-14th century	14 June 1954	SE6069451256; 53°57′14″N 1°04′36″W	1259296	City Wall from the Red Tower to Fishergate Postern Tower More images	Q17530652
The Priory public house	II	99–103 Micklegate	House	Mid-14th century	1 July 1968	SE5981551527; 53°57′23″N 1°05′24″W	1257294	The Priory public house More images	Q26548669
Church of All Saints	I	Pavement	Church	14th century	14 June 1954	SE6041951721; 53°57′29″N 1°04′51″W	1256921	Church of All Saints More images	Q2647826
Church of St Denys	I	Walmgate	Church	14th century	14 June 1954	SE6071351574; 53°57′24″N 1°04′34″W	1256313	Church of St Denys More images	Q7592955
Merchant Adventurers' Hall	I	Fossgate	Hall	1357–1361	14 June 1954	SE6054751705; 53°57′28″N 1°04′44″W	1257828	Merchant Adventurers' Hall More images	Q6818359
Bowes Morrell House	II*	111 Walmgate	House	c. 1400	14 June 1954	SE6094651471; 53°57′21″N 1°04′22″W	1256310	Bowes Morrell House More images	Q107472732
Church of St Cuthbert	I	Peasholme Green	Church	Mid-15th century	14 June 1954	SE6077052033; 53°57′39″N 1°04′31″W	1256888	Church of St Cuthbert More images	Q17530561
34 St Saviourgate	II		House	Mid-15th century	14 June 1954	SE6066051967; 53°57′37″N 1°04′37″W	1256704	34 St Saviourgate More images	Q26548163
Church of St Mary (The York Story)	I	Castlegate	Church	15th century	14 June 1954	SE6044051624; 53°57′26″N 1°04′49″W	1259342	Church of St Mary (The York Story) More images	Q17530659
Church of St Saviour and attached gates and railings	II*	St Saviourgate	Church	15th century	14 June 1954	SE6059051890; 53°57′34″N 1°04′41″W	1256707	Church of St Saviour and attached gates and railings More images	Q20128209
The Red Lion public house and attached outbuildings	II	7 Walmgate	Public house	15th century	14 June 1954	SE6061551634; 53°57′26″N 1°04′40″W	1256359	The Red Lion public house and attached outbuildings More images	Q26547879
75 Walmgate	II		Shop	15th century	24 June 1983	SE6083551532; 53°57′23″N 1°04′28″W	1256350	75 Walmgate More images	Q26547871
77 Walmgate	II*		Shop	15t century	14 June 1954	SE6084351533; 53°57′23″N 1°04′27″W	1256351	77 Walmgate More images	Q17549248
11 Lady Peckett's Yard	II*		House	15th century; c. 1700 (rebuilt)	14 June 1954	SE6050351758; 53°57′30″N 1°04′46″W	1257535	11 Lady Peckett's Yard More images	Q17549840
28, 30 and 32 Coppergate	II*		House	15th century (probable)	14 June 1954	SE6044751726; 53°57′29″N 1°04′49″W	1257901	28, 30 and 32 Coppergate More images	Q17549955
Churchyard cross approximately 15 metres from the north west corner of All Saints Church	II	All Saints Lane	Cross	15th century (possible)	14 March 1997	SE6002451758; 53°57′30″N 1°05′12″W	1259575	Upload Photo	Q26550674
St Anthony's Hall	I	Peasholme Green	Hall	1446–1453	14 June 1954	SE6073151989; 53°57′38″N 1°04′33″W	1256892	St Anthony's Hall More images	Q7592503
Church Cottages	II*	1–2 All Saints Lane	House	Late 15th century	14 June 1954	SE6005851776; 53°57′31″N 1°05′10″W	1257063	Church Cottages More images	Q17549617
26 Coppergate	II*		House	Late 15th century	14 June 1954	SE6044351715; 53°57′29″N 1°04′49″W	1257900	26 Coppergate More images	Q17549950
19 and 21 Micklegate	II		House	Late 15th century	19 August 1971	SE6007551614; 53°57′26″N 1°05′09″W	1257358	19 and 21 Micklegate More images	Q26548722
39 North Street, 1 Tanner Row	II*		House	Late 15th century	19 August 1971	SE6004251793; 53°57′31″N 1°05′11″W	1257066	39 North Street, 1 Tanner Row More images	Q17549619
Jacobs Well	I	5 Trinity Lane	House	Late 15th century	14 June 1954	SE5990851574; 53°57′24″N 1°05′19″W	1256384	Jacobs Well More images	Q17530538
85, 87 and 89 Micklegate	II*		House	c. 1500	14 June 1954	SE5984651557; 53°57′24″N 1°05′22″W	1257323	85, 87 and 89 Micklegate More images	Q17549747
112 Micklegate	II		House	Early 16th century	24 June 1983	SE5980351570; 53°57′24″N 1°05′24″W	1257301	112 Micklegate More images	Q26548675
73 Walmgate	II		House	Early 16th century	24 June 1983	SE6082751536; 53°57′23″N 1°04′28″W	1256349	73 Walmgate More images	Q26547870
The Nags Head public house	II	100 Micklegate	House	c. 1530	19 August 1971	SE5983051584; 53°57′25″N 1°05′23″W	1257297	The Nags Head public house More images	Q26548672
Stocks approximately 22 metres north of porch of Holy Trinity Church	II	Micklegate	Stocks	Post medieval; late 19th century (re-erected)	24 June 1983	SE5986151570; 53°57′24″N 1°05′21″W	1257275	Stocks approximately 22 metres north of porch of Holy Trinity Church More images	Q26548657
67 Micklegate	II*		House	Mid-16th century	14 June 1954	SE5992351610; 53°57′26″N 1°05′18″W	1257308	67 Micklegate More images	Q17549714
The Three Tuns	II	12 Coppergate	Public house	16th century (probable)	14 June 1954	SE6040651683; 53°57′28″N 1°04′51″W	1257942	The Three Tuns More images	Q26549243
70 and 72 Micklegate	II*		House	16th century (probable)	14 June 1954	SE5990851636; 53°57′26″N 1°05′19″W	1257313	70 and 72 Micklegate More images	Q17549741
Micklegate Post Office	II	95 Micklegate	House	16th century (probable)	17 July 1995	SE5983151544; 53°57′24″N 1°05′23″W	1257290	Micklegate Post Office More images	Q26548665
The Black Swan public house	II*	23 Peasholme Green	House	Late 16th century	14 June 1954	SE6074551949; 53°57′36″N 1°04′32″W	1256886	The Black Swan public house More images	Q17549586
15 and 16 Fossgate	II		House	c. 1600	14 June 1954	SE6055051779; 53°57′31″N 1°04′43″W	1257813	15 and 16 Fossgate More images	Q26549136
The Old Rectory	II*	7A Tanner Row	Warehouse (possible)	c. 1600	14 June 1954	SE6002751779; 53°57′31″N 1°05′12″W	1256470	The Old Rectory More images	Q17549273
8 Fossgate	II		House	Early 17th century	14 June 1954	SE6054851812; 53°57′32″N 1°04′43″W	1257850	8 Fossgate More images	Q26549167
69 and 71 Micklegate	II*		House	Early 17th century; c. 1745 (largely rebuilt)	14 June 1954	SE5991751606; 53°57′25″N 1°05′18″W	1257312	69 and 71 Micklegate More images	Q17549737
138 and 142 Micklegate	II		House	Early 17th century	19 August 1971	SE5977451517; 53°57′23″N 1°05′26″W	1257271	138 and 142 Micklegate More images	Q26548655
The Herbert House	I	12–14 Pavement	House	Early 17th century	14 June 1954	SE6048651782; 53°57′31″N 1°04′47″W	1256914	The Herbert House More images	Q17530565
29 Trinity Lane	II		Manufactory	Early 17th century	10 January 1991	SE5997051523; 53°57′23″N 1°05′15″W	1256392	29 Trinity Lane More images	Q26547908
The Kings Arms public house	II	1 King's Staith	Public house	Early 17th century; 1898 (partly rebuilt)	24 June 1983	SE6026851619; 53°57′26″N 1°04′59″W	1257523	The Kings Arms public house More images	Q26548870
Gatehouse to Merchant Adventurers' Hall	II*	39–41 Fossgate	Gatehouse	Mid-17th century; 1962 (rebuilt)	14 June 1954	SE6055851730; 53°57′29″N 1°04′43″W	1257822	Gatehouse to Merchant Adventurers' Hall More images	Q17549914
The Blue Bell	II*	52–54 Fossgate	Public house	Mid-17th century	14 June 1954	SE6051751793; 53°57′31″N 1°04′45″W	1257825	The Blue Bell More images	Q17549920
Number 68 and verandah railings attached at rear	II*	Micklegate	House	Mid-17th century	1 July 1968	SE5991451639; 53°57′27″N 1°05′18″W	1257309	Number 68 and verandah railings attached at rear More images	Q17549731
13 and 14 Fossgate	II		Shop	Late 17th century	1 July 1968	SE6054451784; 53°57′31″N 1°04′44″W	1257811	13 and 14 Fossgate More images	Q26549134
144, 146 and 148 Micklegate	II*		House	Late 17th century	24 June 1983	SE5976651514; 53°57′23″N 1°05′26″W	1257272	144, 146 and 148 Micklegate More images	Q17549675
33, 35 and 37 Micklegate	II*		House	Late 17th century	19 August 1971	SE6003951618; 53°57′26″N 1°05′11″W	1257364	33, 35 and 37 Micklegate More images	Q17549764
102 and 104 Micklegate	II*		House	Late 17th century	19 August 1971	SE5982551581; 53°57′25″N 1°05′23″W	1257300	102 and 104 Micklegate More images	Q17549711
114 Micklegate	II		House	Late 17th century	1 July 1968	SE5980651558; 53°57′24″N 1°05′24″W	1257302	114 Micklegate More images	Q26548676
3 and 5 Victor Street	II		Rectory	Late 17th century	1 July 1968	SE6012951358; 53°57′17″N 1°05′07″W	1256393	3 and 5 Victor Street More images	Q26547909
25 Walmgate	II		House	Late 17th century	19 August 1971	SE6066751617; 53°57′26″N 1°04′37″W	1256377	25 Walmgate More images	Q26547897
122, 124 and 126 Micklegate	II*		House	Late 17th and early 18th century	1 July 1968	SE5978751545; 53°57′24″N 1°05′25″W	1257267	122, 124 and 126 Micklegate More images	Q17549673
19, 21 and 23 Walmgate	II		House	Late 17th and early 18th century	14 March 1997	SE6065551628; 53°57′26″N 1°04′38″W	1256371	19, 21 and 23 Walmgate More images	Q26547891
St Saviourgate Unitarian Chapel	II*	St Saviourgate	Chapel	1692	14 June 1954	SE6062151975; 53°57′37″N 1°04′39″W	1256710	St Saviourgate Unitarian Chapel More images	Q8055589
26 and 28 Pavement	II		House	c. 1700	14 June 1954	SE6051051806; 53°57′32″N 1°04′45″W	1256919	26 and 28 Pavement More images	Q26548341
12 St Martin's Lane	II		Warehouse	c. 1700	8 March 1993	SE6000651551; 53°57′24″N 1°05′13″W	1256770	12 St Martin's Lane More images	Q26548216
34 Walmgate	II		House	c. 1700	14 March 1997	SE6069451628; 53°57′26″N 1°04′35″W	1256336	34 Walmgate More images	Q26547859
68 and 70 Walmgate	II*		House	c. 1700	19 August 1971	SE6077751588; 53°57′25″N 1°04′31″W	1256346	68 and 70 Walmgate More images	Q17549243
Castle Museum, the Debtor's Prison	I	Castle Precinct	Prison	1701–1705	14 June 1954	SE6053651369; 53°57′18″N 1°04′44″W	1259360	Castle Museum, the Debtor's Prison More images	Q17530660
11 and 12 High Ousegate	II		House	c. 1705	14 June 1954	SE6037651735; 53°57′29″N 1°04′53″W	1257624	11 and 12 High Ousegate More images	Q26548959
Cumberland House	I	9 King's Staith	House	c. 1710	14 June 1954	SE6028551584; 53°57′25″N 1°04′58″W	1257526	Cumberland House More images	Q17530613
Bishophill House	II	11–13 Bishophill Senior	House	Early 18th century	14 June 1954	SE6006051517; 53°57′23″N 1°05′10″W	1259549	Bishophill House More images	Q26550653
19 Bishophill Senior	II		House	Early 18th century	24 June 1983	SE6007751503; 53°57′22″N 1°05′09″W	1259552	19 Bishophill Senior More images	Q26550656
1, 3 and 3A Castlegate	II		House	Early 18th century	14 June 1954	SE6037651657; 53°57′27″N 1°04′53″W	1259330	1, 3 and 3A Castlegate More images	Q26550456
The Little John public house and attached carriage gates	II	5 Castlegate	Public house	Early 18th century	19 August 1971	SE6038451649; 53°57′27″N 1°04′52″W	1259331	The Little John public house and attached carriage gates More images	Q26550457
Friargate House	II	12–16 Castlegate	House	Early 18th century (Nos. 12 and 14); early 19th century (No. 16)	14 June 1954	SE6040351616; 53°57′26″N 1°04′51″W	1259334	Friargate House More images	Q26550460
18 Castlegate	II		House	Early 18th century	19 August 1971	SE6041151611; 53°57′25″N 1°04′51″W	1259335	18 Castlegate More images	Q26550461
13 and 14 High Ousegate	II		House	Early 18th century	14 June 1954	SE6039351743; 53°57′30″N 1°04′52″W	1257625	13 and 14 High Ousegate More images	Q26548960
19 High Ousegate	II		House	Early 18th century	24 June 1983	SE6038151715; 53°57′29″N 1°04′53″W	1257627	19 High Ousegate More images	Q26548962
20 High Ousegate	II		House	Early 18th century	24 June 1983	SE6037751713; 53°57′29″N 1°04′53″W	1257628	20 High Ousegate More images	Q26548963
21 High Ousegate	II		House	Early 18th century	24 June 1983	SE6037251711; 53°57′29″N 1°04′53″W	1257629	21 High Ousegate More images	Q26548964
7 Low Ousegate	II		House	Early 18th century; 1810–1820 (partly rebuilt)	24 June 1983	SE6028051653; 53°57′27″N 1°04′58″W	1257447	7 Low Ousegate More images	Q26548799
13 Low Ousegate	II		House	Early 18th century	24 June 1983	SE6030051660; 53°57′27″N 1°04′57″W	1257451	13 Low Ousegate More images	Q26548803
Bathurst House and railings attached at front	II*	86 Micklegate	House	Early 18th century	14 June 1954	SE5987351610; 53°57′26″N 1°05′21″W	1257284	Bathurst House and railings attached at front More images	Q17549696
91 and 93 Micklegate	II		House	Early 18th century	1 July 1968	SE5983651549; 53°57′24″N 1°05′23″W	1257287	91 and 93 Micklegate More images	Q26548663
6 Pavement	II		House	Early 18th century	19 August 1971	SE6046851764; 53°57′30″N 1°04′48″W	1256911	6 Pavement More images	Q26548335
26 St Saviourgate	II*		House	Early 18th century	14 June 1954	SE6064751952; 53°57′36″N 1°04′38″W	1256699	26 St Saviourgate More images	Q17549486
7 Tanner Row	II		House	Early 18th century	14 June 1954	SE6003251783; 53°57′31″N 1°05′12″W	1256469	7 Tanner Row More images	Q26547981
73 and 75 Micklegate	II		House	c. 1730	14 June 1954	SE5990951601; 53°57′25″N 1°05′19″W	1257314	73 and 75 Micklegate More images	Q26548683
83 Micklegate	II		House	c. 1730	14 June 1954	SE5985451566; 53°57′24″N 1°05′22″W	1257322	83 Micklegate More images	Q26548691
29 and 31 St Saviourgate	II		House	1735	14 June 1954	SE6061951958; 53°57′37″N 1°04′39″W	1256701	29 and 31 St Saviourgate More images	Q26548160
11 and 13 Micklegate	II		House	c. 1740	14 June 1954	SE6009551612; 53°57′26″N 1°05′08″W	1257356	11 and 13 Micklegate More images	Q26548720
118 and 120 Micklegate	II*		House	c. 1740	14 June 1954	SE5979451551; 53°57′24″N 1°05′25″W	1257264	118 and 120 Micklegate More images	Q17549669
16–22 St Saviourgate	II*		House	c. 1740	14 June 1954	SE6063551938; 53°57′36″N 1°04′39″W	1256697	16–22 St Saviourgate More images	Q17549475
35 and 37 Walmgate	II		House	c. 1740	14 March 1997	SE6070751599; 53°57′25″N 1°04′35″W	1256337	35 and 37 Walmgate More images	Q26547860
136 Micklegate	II		House	1740	19 August 1971	SE5978751532; 53°57′23″N 1°05′25″W	1257270	136 Micklegate More images	Q26548654
5 High Ousegate	II		House	1743	14 June 1954	SE6033651717; 53°57′29″N 1°04′55″W	1257646	5 High Ousegate More images	Q26548981
Fairfax House	I	25–27 Castlegate	House	c. 1744 (No. 27); early 19th century (probable, No. 25)	14 June 1954	SE6046351578; 53°57′24″N 1°04′48″W	1259337	Fairfax House More images	Q15978988
42–48 Micklegate	II		Shop	1747	1 July 1968	SE5997451650; 53°57′27″N 1°05′15″W	1257329	42–48 Micklegate More images	Q26548697
17 Bishophill Senior	II		House	Mid-18th century	24 June 1983	SE6007551507; 53°57′22″N 1°05′10″W	1259551	17 Bishophill Senior More images	Q26550655
Railings and gate piers approximately 10 metres north east of number 26 (Castlegate House)	II*	Castlegate	Railings	Mid-18th century	24 June 1983	SE6044151585; 53°57′25″N 1°04′49″W	1259339	Railings and gate piers approximately 10 metres north east of number 26 (Castlegate House) More images	Q17550041
56 Micklegate	II		House	Mid-18th century	19 August 1971	SE5994151646; 53°57′27″N 1°05′17″W	1257337	56 Micklegate More images	Q26548703
74 and 76 Micklegate	II		House	Mid-18th century	19 August 1971	SE5988951647; 53°57′27″N 1°05′20″W	1257316	74 and 76 Micklegate More images	Q26548685
128, 130 and 132 Micklegate	II		House	Mid-18th century	14 June 1954	SE5978051524; 53°57′23″N 1°05′26″W	1257268	128, 130 and 132 Micklegate More images	Q26548652
Number 14 and garden wall, gate and railings attached at front	II	St Saviour's Place	House	Mid-18th century	14 June 1954	SE6068751984; 53°57′37″N 1°04′36″W	1256693	Number 14 and garden wall, gate and railings attached at front More images	Q26548156
30, 32 and 32A St Saviourgate	II		House	Mid-18th century	14 June 1954	SE6065451959; 53°57′37″N 1°04′37″W	1256702	30, 32 and 32A St Saviourgate More images	Q26548161
The Corner Pin	II	17 Tanner Row	House	Mid-18th century	14 March 1997	SE6001351764; 53°57′31″N 1°05′13″W	1256471	The Corner Pin More images	Q26547982
8 and 8A Walmgate	II		House	Mid-18th century	14 June 1954	SE6063851658; 53°57′27″N 1°04′39″W	1256361	8 and 8A Walmgate More images	Q26547881
9 Walmgate	II		Inn	Mid-18th century	19 August 1971	SE6062351637; 53°57′26″N 1°04′39″W	1256363	9 Walmgate More images	Q26547883
11 and 11A Walmgate	II		House	Mid-18th century	24 June 1983	SE6062951637; 53°57′26″N 1°04′39″W	1256364	11 and 11A Walmgate More images	Q26547884
17 Walmgate	II		House	Mid-18th century	14 March 1997	SE6064451626; 53°57′26″N 1°04′38″W	1256369	17 Walmgate More images	Q26547889
Walls bounding churchyard of Holy Trinity Church	II	Micklegate	Wall	18th century	24 June 1983	SE5989051596; 53°57′25″N 1°05′20″W	1257276	Walls bounding churchyard of Holy Trinity Church More images	Q26548658
55 Skeldergate	II		House	18th century; 1942 (partly rebuilt)	14 February 1977	SE6023551404; 53°57′19″N 1°05′01″W	1256635	55 Skeldergate More images	Q26548116
Boundary walls to Friends Burial Ground	II	Cromwell Road	Wall	18th and 19th century	14 March 1997	SE6017451351; 53°57′17″N 1°05′04″W	1257905	Upload Photo	Q26549212
53 and 55 Micklegate	II*		House	1751	14 June 1954	SE5995251623; 53°57′26″N 1°05′16″W	1257333	53 and 55 Micklegate More images	Q17549750
Micklegate House and attached railings and lamp brackets	I	88–90 Micklegate	House	1752	14 June 1954	SE5985451600; 53°57′25″N 1°05′22″W	1257285	Micklegate House and attached railings and lamp brackets More images	Q17530603
Peaseholme House	II*	St Saviour's Place	House	1752	14 June 1954	SE6068151948; 53°57′36″N 1°04′36″W	1256694	Peaseholme House More images	Q17549469
Garforth House and railings attached at front, garden wall attached at rear	I	54 Micklegate	House	1757	14 June 1954	SE5995251651; 53°57′27″N 1°05′16″W	1257335	Garforth House and railings attached at front, garden wall attached at rear More images	Q17530606
Castlegate House and attached railings	I	26 Castlegate	House	1762–63	14 June 1954	SE6042651573; 53°57′24″N 1°04′50″W	1259338	Castlegate House and attached railings More images	Q17530658
24 St Saviourgate	II*		House	1763	14 June 1954	SE6063951944; 53°57′36″N 1°04′38″W	1256698	24 St Saviourgate More images	Q17549481
27 St Saviourgate	II		House	1763	14 June 1954	SE6060851942; 53°57′36″N 1°04′40″W	1256700	27 St Saviourgate More images	Q26548159
Dorothy Wilson's Hospital and attached cottage	II	2 Walmgate	House	1765; 1812 (rebuilt)	14 June 1954	SE6061351688; 53°57′28″N 1°04′40″W	1256398	Dorothy Wilson's Hospital and attached cottage More images	Q26547914
9 and 11 Castlegate	II		House	1766	19 August 1971	SE6039851641; 53°57′26″N 1°04′52″W	1259333	9 and 11 Castlegate More images	Q26550459
Crown Court and railings attached to front	I	Castle Precinct	Courthouse	1773–1777	14 June 1954	SE6051751399; 53°57′19″N 1°04′45″W	1259328	Crown Court and railings attached to front More images	Q17530654
7 Castlegate	II		House	Late 18th century	1 July 1968	SE6038851646; 53°57′27″N 1°04′52″W	1259332	7 Castlegate More images	Q26550458
Entrance gates at Stamford House and George House	II	George Street	Gate	Late 18th century	8 March 2001	SE6075851496; 53°57′22″N 1°04′32″W	1271221	Entrance gates at Stamford House and George House More images	Q26561193
The Phoenix public house	II	75 George Street	Public house	Late 18th century	14 March 1997	SE6079651291; 53°57′15″N 1°04′30″W	1257774	The Phoenix public house More images	Q26549100
29 and 31 Micklegate	II		Hotel	Late 18th century	13 October 1975	SE6004851617; 53°57′26″N 1°05′11″W	1257363	29 and 31 Micklegate	Q26548727
58 and 60 Micklegate	II		House	Late 18th century	19 August 1971	SE5993251641; 53°57′27″N 1°05′17″W	1257342	58 and 60 Micklegate More images	Q26548707
51 Skeldergate	II		House	Late 18th century	14 June 1954	SE6025751367; 53°57′18″N 1°05′00″W	1256633	51 Skeldergate More images	Q26548114
The Five Lions public house and attached outbuildings	II	24 Walmgate	Inn	Late 18th century	14 June 1954	SE6066851642; 53°57′26″N 1°04′37″W	1256374	The Five Lions public house and attached outbuildings More images	Q26547894
26 and 28 Walmgate	II		House	Late 18th century	8 January 1982	SE6067651636; 53°57′26″N 1°04′36″W	1256333	26 and 28 Walmgate More images	Q26547856
12 and 13 St Saviour's Place	II		House	Late 18th and early 19th century	24 June 1983	SE6069551974; 53°57′37″N 1°04′35″W	1256692	12 and 13 St Saviour's Place More images	Q26548155
35 and 37 North Street	II		House	Late 18th and early 19th century (probable)	19 August 1971	SE6005151789; 53°57′31″N 1°05′11″W	1257065	35 and 37 North Street More images	Q26548480
98 Micklegate	II		House	c. 1775	19 August 1971	SE5984051589; 53°57′25″N 1°05′22″W	1257292	98 Micklegate More images	Q26548667
Skeldergate House Hotel	II*	56 Skeldergate	House	c. 1777–78	14 June 1954	SE6023351414; 53°57′19″N 1°05′01″W	1256636	Skeldergate House Hotel More images	Q17549394
Castle Museum, the Female Prison	I	Castle Precinct	Prison	1780–1783	14 June 1954	SE6058451438; 53°57′20″N 1°04′42″W	1259324	Castle Museum, the Female Prison More images	Q85760741
57 and 59 Micklegate	II*		House	1783	14 June 1954	SE5994351619; 53°57′26″N 1°05′17″W	1257340	57 and 59 Micklegate More images	Q17549755
61 Micklegate	II*		House	c. 1786	14 June 1954	SE5993651617; 53°57′26″N 1°05′17″W	1257344	61 Micklegate More images	Q17549760
Number 92 and railings attached at front and rear	II*	Micklegate	House	c. 1789	14 June 1954	SE5985351593; 53°57′25″N 1°05′22″W	1257288	Number 92 and railings attached at front and rear More images	Q17549698
77 and 79 Micklegate	II		House	c. 1790	14 June 1954	SE5990451598; 53°57′25″N 1°05′19″W	1257318	77 and 79 Micklegate More images	Q26548687
30 Pavement, 55 and 56 Fossgate	II		House	c. 1796	14 June 1954	SE6051751806; 53°57′32″N 1°04′45″W	1257826	30 Pavement, 55 and 56 Fossgate More images	Q26549147
15 Bishophill Senior	II		House	c. 1800	24 June 1983	SE6006851509; 53°57′22″N 1°05′10″W	1259550	15 Bishophill Senior More images	Q26550654
10 and 10A Fossgate	II		House	c. 1800	14 March 1997	SE6054451801; 53°57′32″N 1°04′44″W	1257851	10 and 10A Fossgate More images	Q26549168
24 Pavement	II		House	c. 1800	19 August 1971	SE6050551796; 53°57′31″N 1°04′46″W	1256917	24 Pavement More images	Q26548339
Ouse Bridge and attached flights of steps	II	Bridge Street	Bridge	1810–1820	14 June 1954	SE6021751648; 53°57′27″N 1°05′02″W	1259354	Ouse Bridge and attached flights of steps More images	Q26550475
1 and 1A Low Ousegate	II		House	1810–1820	24 June 1983	SE6026451646; 53°57′27″N 1°04′59″W	1257443	1 and 1A Low Ousegate More images	Q26548795
3 and 5 Low Ousegate	II		House	1810–1820	24 June 1983	SE6027551651; 53°57′27″N 1°04′58″W	1257444	3 and 5 Low Ousegate More images	Q26548796
4, 6 and 8 Low Ousegate	II		House	1810–1820	14 March 1997	SE6025951675; 53°57′28″N 1°04′59″W	1257445	4, 6 and 8 Low Ousegate More images	Q26548797
10 and 12 Low Ousegate	II		House	1810–1820	14 June 1954	SE6027351677; 53°57′28″N 1°04′59″W	1257450	10 and 12 Low Ousegate More images	Q26548802
14 Low Ousegate	II		House	1810–1820	24 June 1983	SE6028151681; 53°57′28″N 1°04′58″W	1257452	14 Low Ousegate More images	Q26548804
Foss Bridge	II*	Fossgate	Bridge	1811–12	14 June 1954	SE6059751691; 53°57′28″N 1°04′41″W	1257827	Foss Bridge More images	Q17549924
35 and 36 Fossgate	II		Public house	c. 1812	24 June 1983	SE6056951714; 53°57′29″N 1°04′42″W	1257820	35 and 36 Fossgate More images	Q26549143
1 Bridge Street	II		Shop	1815–1820	24 June 1983	SE6017451624; 53°57′26″N 1°05′04″W	1259343	1 Bridge Street More images	Q26550465
6 and 7 Bridge Street	II		Shop	1815–1820	19 August 1971	SE6015251616; 53°57′26″N 1°05′05″W	1259347	6 and 7 Bridge Street More images	Q26550469
8 Bridge Street	II		Shop	c. 1820	19 August 1971	SE6014451617; 53°57′26″N 1°05′06″W	1259348	8 Bridge Street More images	Q26550470
1 Skeldergate, 9 Bridge Street	II		Shop	c. 1820	19 August 1971	SE6014051620; 53°57′26″N 1°05′06″W	1259349	1 Skeldergate, 9 Bridge Street More images	Q26550471
78–84 Micklegate	II		House	c. 1822	14 June 1954	SE5989451626; 53°57′26″N 1°05′19″W	1257319	78–84 Micklegate More images	Q26548688
The Golden Ball public house	II	Cromwell Road	Public house	Early 19th century	14 April 2010	SE6013551362; 53°57′18″N 1°05′06″W	1393746	The Golden Ball public house More images	Q26672890
Number 20 and wall attached to south west corner	II	Castlegate	House	Early 19th century	14 June 1954	SE6041751606; 53°57′25″N 1°04′51″W	1259336	Number 20 and wall attached to south west corner More images	Q26550462
23 Fossgate	II		House	Early 19th century	14 March 1997	SE6056451755; 53°57′30″N 1°04′43″W	1257816	23 Fossgate More images	Q26549139
Row of tenements attached to number 24 Fossgate	II		House	Early 19th century	14 March 1997	SE6056851751; 53°57′30″N 1°04′42″W	1257817	Row of tenements attached to number 24 Fossgate More images	Q26549140
9 and 11 Low Ousegate	II		House	Early 19th century	19 August 1971	SE6029151655; 53°57′27″N 1°04′58″W	1257448	9 and 11 Low Ousegate More images	Q26548800
23 and 25 Micklegate	II		Hotel	Early 19th century	19 August 1971	SE6005751617; 53°57′26″N 1°05′10″W	1257361	23 and 25 Micklegate More images	Q26548725
50 Micklegate	II		Shop	Early 19th century	19 August 1971	SE5996251652; 53°57′27″N 1°05′16″W	1257331	50 Micklegate More images	Q26548699
63 and 65 Micklegate	II		House	Early 19th century	14 June 1954	SE5992951614; 53°57′26″N 1°05′17″W	1257306	63 and 65 Micklegate More images	Q26548680
Postern House	II	1 Tower Place	House	Early 19th century	24 June 1983	SE6040651419; 53°57′19″N 1°04′51″W	1256411	Postern House	Q26547926
Numbers 2–8 (consecutive) and attached garden railings, gates and gate posts	II	Tower Place	House	Early 19t century	14 June 1954	SE6037651410; 53°57′19″N 1°04′53″W	1256412	Numbers 2–8 (consecutive) and attached garden railings, gates and gate posts More images	Q26547927
11 and 12 Tower Street	II		House	Early 19th century	14 March 1997	SE6041051439; 53°57′20″N 1°04′51″W	1256382	11 and 12 Tower Street More images	Q26547900
13 and 14 Tower Street	II		House	Early 19th century	14 March 1997	SE6041651428; 53°57′20″N 1°04′51″W	1256383	13 and 14 Tower Street More images	Q26547901
Maxwell's Hotel (numbers 50, 52 and 54)	II	50–58 Walmgate	House	Early 19th century	19 August 1971	SE6073851605; 53°57′25″N 1°04′33″W	1256340	Maxwell's Hotel (numbers 50, 52 and 54) More images	Q26547862
The Spread Eagle public house	II	98 Walmgate	Public house	Early 19th century	14 March 1997	SE6088051540; 53°57′23″N 1°04′25″W	1256353	The Spread Eagle public house More images	Q26547873
42 and 43 Fossgate	II		House	1825	24 June 1983	SE6055251737; 53°57′29″N 1°04′43″W	1257824	42 and 43 Fossgate More images	Q26549146
31 Castlegate	II		Office	1825–26	24 June 1983	SE6048151560; 53°57′24″N 1°04′47″W	1259341	31 Castlegate More images	Q26550464
64 Aldwark, 11 St Saviour's Place	II		Public house	1826	20 March 1992	SE6071151974; 53°57′37″N 1°04′34″W	1256691	64 Aldwark, 11 St Saviour's Place More images	Q26548154
Lady Anne Middleton's Hotel and attached garden walls	II*	Skeldergate	Hospital	1829	14 June 1954	SE6019551410; 53°57′19″N 1°05′03″W	1256639	Lady Anne Middleton's Hotel and attached garden walls More images	Q108907102
52 Skeldergate	II		Sawmill	1829	14 February 1977	SE6024351390; 53°57′18″N 1°05′00″W	1256634	52 Skeldergate More images	Q26548115
3 and 4 Bridge Street	II		Shop	c. 1830	23 April 1982	SE6016251622; 53°57′26″N 1°05′05″W	1259345	3 and 4 Bridge Street More images	Q26550467
37 and 38 Fossgate	II		House	c. 1830	24 June 1983	SE6056351723; 53°57′29″N 1°04′43″W	1257821	37 and 38 Fossgate More images	Q26549144
5 Walmgate	II		House	c. 1830	19 August 1971	SE6060551664; 53°57′27″N 1°04′40″W	1256357	5 Walmgate More images	Q26547877
15 Walmgate	II		House	c. 1830	14 March 1997	SE6064151635; 53°57′26″N 1°04′38″W	1256367	15 Walmgate More images	Q26547887
39 and 41 Micklegate	II		House	1835	19 August 1971	SE6002551621; 53°57′26″N 1°05′12″W	1257326	39 and 41 Micklegate More images	Q26548694
1 and 3 Nessgate	II		Bank	1839	14 March 1997	SE6033551682; 53°57′28″N 1°04′55″W	1257090	1 and 3 Nessgate More images	Q26548499
The Golden Fleece public house and attached outbuilding at rear	II	16 Pavement	Public house	c. 1840 (rebuilt)	24 June 1983	SE6049051787; 53°57′31″N 1°04′47″W	1256915	The Golden Fleece public house and attached outbuilding at rear More images	Q5579404
29 Castlegate	II		House	c. 1840	24 June 1983	SE6047451568; 53°57′24″N 1°04′48″W	1259340	29 Castlegate More images	Q26550463
1 and 3 George Street	II		House	c. 1840	24 June 1983	SE6080551540; 53°57′23″N 1°04′29″W	1257769	1 and 3 George Street More images	Q26549095
22–25 High Ousegate	II		House	c. 1840	24 June 1983	SE6036751705; 53°57′29″N 1°04′53″W	1257630	22–25 High Ousegate More images	Q26548965
40 Micklegate	II		Shop	c. 1840	18 February 1991	SE5998551650; 53°57′27″N 1°05′14″W	1257328	40 Micklegate More images	Q26548696
62, 64 and 66 Micklegate	II		House	c. 1840	19 August 1971	SE5992551641; 53°57′27″N 1°05′18″W	1257305	62, 64 and 66 Micklegate More images	Q26548679
1–7 St Saviourgate	II		House	c. 1840	1 July 1968	SE6052751869; 53°57′34″N 1°04′44″W	1256695	1–7 St Saviourgate More images	Q26548157
13 Walmgate	II		House	c. 1840	24 June 1983	SE6063351632; 53°57′26″N 1°04′39″W	1256365	13 Walmgate More images	Q26547885
32 Walmgate	II		House	c. 1840	14 March 1997	SE6068851630; 53°57′26″N 1°04′36″W	1256334	32 Walmgate More images	Q26547857
65, 67, 69 and 69A Walmgate	II		House	c. 1840	24 June 1983	SE6081551547; 53°57′23″N 1°04′29″W	1256344	65, 67, 69 and 69A Walmgate More images	Q26547866
13–16 Bridge Street	II		Shop	c. 1840; 20th century (partly rebuilt)	14 March 1997	SE6014051654; 53°57′27″N 1°05′06″W	1259352	13–16 Bridge Street More images	Q26550473
Central Methodist Church and attached ancillary buildings	II*	St Saviourgate	Chapel	1840	1 July 1968	SE6054051896; 53°57′35″N 1°04′44″W	1256705	Central Methodist Church and attached ancillary buildings More images	Q107490245
Lady Hewley's Almshouses numbers 2–10 (consecutive) and number 8A	II	St Saviourgate	House	1840	14 June 1954	SE6064551884; 53°57′34″N 1°04′38″W	1256708	Lady Hewley's Almshouses numbers 2–10 (consecutive) and number 8A More images	Q26548165
Lady Hewley's Almshouses	II	14 St Saviourgate	House	1840	14 June 1954	SE6061251914; 53°57′35″N 1°04′40″W	1256696	Lady Hewley's Almshouses More images	Q26548158
Old station and former Station Hotel	II*	Toft Green	Railway station	1840–41	20 December 1974	SE5985051741; 53°57′30″N 1°05′22″W	1256403	Old station and former Station Hotel More images	Q8055616
5 Bridge Street	II		Public house	1840–1850	24 June 1983	SE6015851619; 53°57′26″N 1°05′05″W	1259346	5 Bridge Street More images	Q26550468
Numbers 1–7 (consecutive) and gates and railings attached to numbers 2–6	II	Peckitt Street	House	c. 1840–1860	24 June 1983	SE6035851460; 53°57′21″N 1°04′54″W	1256894	Numbers 1–7 (consecutive) and gates and railings attached to numbers 2–6 More images	Q26548320
The Falcon Inn (number 94)	II	94–96 Micklegate	Public house	c. 1842	19 August 1971	SE5984251594; 53°57′25″N 1°05′22″W	1257289	The Falcon Inn (number 94) More images	Q26548664
15, 16 and 17 Rougier Street	II		House	c. 1842	24 June 1983	SE5992651837; 53°57′33″N 1°05′17″W	1256839	15, 16 and 17 Rougier Street More images	Q26548277
2 Bridge Street	II		Shop	1842	24 June 1983	SE6016951623; 53°57′26″N 1°05′04″W	1259344	2 Bridge Street More images	Q26550466
9, 11 and 13 George Street	II		House	c. 1844	24 June 1983	SE6079251512; 53°57′22″N 1°04′30″W	1257770	9, 11 and 13 George Street More images	Q26549096
15–27 George Street	II		House	c. 1845	24 June 1983	SE6076951484; 53°57′21″N 1°04′31″W	1257771	15–27 George Street More images	Q26549097
Toft Green Chambers	II	Toft Green	House	c. 1845	24 June 1983	SE5972551560; 53°57′24″N 1°05′29″W	1256410	Toft Green Chambers More images	Q26547925
Masonic Hall	II	St Saviourgate	Mechanics' institute	1845–46	24 June 1983	SE6059551931; 53°57′36″N 1°04′41″W	1256709	Masonic Hall More images	Q26548166
39 Tanner Row	II		Public house	1845–1850	24 June 1983	SE5991151691; 53°57′28″N 1°05′18″W	1256475	39 Tanner Row More images	Q26547986
43 Tanner Row	II		Workshop	1845–1850	24 June 1983	SE5989451692; 53°57′28″N 1°05′19″W	1256476	43 Tanner Row More images	Q26547987
Varvil's Warehouse	II	Queen's Staith	Warehouse	1849	20 June 1989	SE6017851600; 53°57′25″N 1°05′04″W	1256832	Varvil's Warehouse More images	Q26548270
Church of St George and attached rectory, gates and railings	II	George Street	Church	1849–50	24 June 1983	SE6078651410; 53°57′19″N 1°04′31″W	1257775	Church of St George and attached rectory, gates and railings	Q7588164
Number 14 and railings attached to number 5 King's Staith	II	King Street	House	Mid-19th century	24 June 1983	SE6027551597; 53°57′25″N 1°04′59″W	1257515	Number 14 and railings attached to number 5 King's Staith More images	Q26548862
7 King's Staith	II		House	Mid-19th century	24 June 1983	SE6027951593; 53°57′25″N 1°04′58″W	1257524	7 King's Staith More images	Q26548871
The Adelphi Hotel	II	28 Micklegate	Hotel	Mid-19th century	19 August 1971	SE6001451655; 53°57′27″N 1°05′13″W	1257767	The Adelphi Hotel More images	Q26549093
150 Micklegate	II		Shop	Mid-19th century	14 March 1997	SE5975851498; 53°57′22″N 1°05′27″W	1257273	150 Micklegate More images	Q26548656
5 and 7 Nessgate	II		House	Mid-19th century	14 March 1997	SE6034851671; 53°57′27″N 1°04′54″W	1257091	5 and 7 Nessgate More images	Q26548500
8 Pavement	II		House	Mid-19th century	19 August 1971	SE6047251770; 53°57′31″N 1°04′48″W	1256912	8 Pavement More images	Q26548336
Gas lamp post approximately 6.25 metres south west of Assembly of God Pentecostal Church	II	Priory Street	Lamp post	Mid-19th century	25 June 1982	SE5987951497; 53°57′22″N 1°05′20″W	1256851	Gas lamp post approximately 6.25 metres south west of Assembly of God Pentecostal Church More images	Q26548286
Gas lamp post approximately 6.75 metres south west of Assembly of God Pentecostal Church	II	Priory Street	Lamp post	Mid-19th century	25 June 1982	SE5986951506; 53°57′22″N 1°05′21″W	1256852	Gas lamp post approximately 6.75 metres south west of Assembly of God Pentecostal Church More images	Q26548287
Millbank House	II	Queen's Staith	Warehouse	Mid-19th century	24 June 1983	SE6021051533; 53°57′23″N 1°05′02″W	1256830	Millbank House More images	Q26548268
Woods Mill	II	Queen's Staith	Mill	Mid-19th century	24 June 1983	SE6020151545; 53°57′23″N 1°05′03″W	1256834	Woods Mill More images	Q26548272
St Martin's House, Walker's Bar (numbers 47 and 49) and yard wall attached to number 1 St Martin's Lane	II	Micklegate and St Martin's Lane	Shop	Mid-19th century	24 June 1983	SE5997151628; 53°57′26″N 1°05′15″W	1257330	St Martin's House, Walker's Bar (numbers 47 and 49) and yard wall attached to number 1 St Martin's Lane More images	Q26548698
Numbers 2, 2A and 3–7 (consecutive) and attached boundary stone	II	St Martin's Lane	House	Mid-19th century	14 March 1997	SE5998551592; 53°57′25″N 1°05′14″W	1256769	Numbers 2, 2A and 3–7 (consecutive) and attached boundary stone More images	Q26548215
Numbers 3 and 4 and gates and railings attached to front	II	Tower Street	House	Mid-19th century	14 March 1997	SE6039951512; 53°57′22″N 1°04′52″W	1256419	Numbers 3 and 4 and gates and railings attached to front More images	Q26547933
6 and 7 Tower Street	II		House	Mid-19th century	14 March 1997	SE6039651472; 53°57′21″N 1°04′52″W	1256379	6 and 7 Tower Street More images	Q26547898
Numbers 8, 9, 10, 10A and B Tower Street	II		Shop	Mid-19th century	14 March 1997	SE6039551463; 53°57′21″N 1°04′52″W	1256380	Numbers 8, 9, 10, 10A and B Tower Street More images	Q26547899
29 and 31 George Street, 1 Chapel Row	II		House	c. 1850	24 June 1983	SE6076151475; 53°57′21″N 1°04′32″W	1257773	29 and 31 George Street, 1 Chapel Row More images	Q26549099
33 North Street	II		House	c. 1850	19 August 1971	SE6005651783; 53°57′31″N 1°05′10″W	1257064	33 North Street More images	Q26548479
Outbuilding approximately 10 metres south east of number 37	II	Tanner Row	Stables	c. 1850	14 March 1997	SE5993651694; 53°57′28″N 1°05′17″W	1256474	Outbuilding approximately 10 metres south east of number 37 More images	Q26547985
Number 37 and attached railings	II	Tanner Row	Hotel	c. 1850	24 June 1983	SE5992251708; 53°57′29″N 1°05′18″W	1256473	Number 37 and attached railings More images	Q26547984
Gates, gate piers and railings to old station forecourt	II	Toft Green	Gate	c. 1850	20 December 1974	SE5985551682; 53°57′28″N 1°05′21″W	1256408	Gates, gate piers and railings to old station forecourt More images	Q26547923
64 and 66 Walmgate	II		House	c. 1850	24 June 1983	SE6076751592; 53°57′25″N 1°04′32″W	1256343	64 and 66 Walmgate More images	Q26547865
Railings, gate piers and gates approximately 10 metres to south east of Unitarian Chapel	II	St Saviourgate	Railings	1851	24 June 1983	SE6063351959; 53°57′37″N 1°04′39″W	1256711	Railings, gate piers and gates approximately 10 metres to south east of Unitarian Chapel More images	Q26548167
Gate approximately 100 metres south west of St Margaret's Church	II	Walmgate	Gate	1851–52	24 June 1983	SE6090351521; 53°57′22″N 1°04′24″W	1256259	Gate approximately 100 metres south west of St Margaret's Church More images	Q26547790
Numbers 1, 1A and 2–15 (consecutive) garden railings and gates attached	II	Dewsbury Terrace	House	c. 1853	24 June 1983	SE5985551443; 53°57′20″N 1°05′22″W	1257886	Numbers 1, 1A and 2–15 (consecutive) garden railings and gates attached More images	Q26549196
Railings approximately 6.5 metres from south west corner of Assembly of God Pentecostal Church	II	Priory Street	Railings	c. 1854	25 June 1982	SE5988151493; 53°57′22″N 1°05′20″W	1256855	Railings approximately 6.5 metres from south west corner of Assembly of God Pentecostal Church More images	Q26548290
Railings approximately 7 metres from north west corner of Assembly of God Pentecostal Church	II	Priory Street	Railings	c. 1854	25 June 1982	SE5986351509; 53°57′22″N 1°05′21″W	1256854	Railings approximately 7 metres from north west corner of Assembly of God Pentecostal Church More images	Q26548289
Assembly of God Pentecostal Church and building attached at rear	II*	Priory Street	Chapel	1854	25 June 1982	SE5989351524; 53°57′23″N 1°05′20″W	1256884	Assembly of God Pentecostal Church and building attached at rear More images	Q108607483
Friars Terrace numbers 1, 2 and 3 and attached gates and railings	II	8 Peckitt Street	House	c. 1855	14 February 1977	SE6034651450; 53°57′20″N 1°04′55″W	1256609	Friars Terrace numbers 1, 2 and 3 and attached gates and railings More images	Q26548091
Numbers 8 and 10 and attached railings and gates	II	Priory Street	House	c. 1855	24 June 1983	SE5986451481; 53°57′21″N 1°05′21″W	1256877	Numbers 8 and 10 and attached railings and gates More images	Q26548308
Numbers 31 and 33 and attached front gates and railings	II	Priory Street	House	c. 1855	29 March 1988	SE5994851445; 53°57′20″N 1°05′17″W	1256881	Numbers 31 and 33 and attached front gates and railings More images	Q26548312
Priory Street Sports and Community Centre	II	Priory Street	School	1858	24 June 1983	SE5994551493; 53°57′22″N 1°05′17″W	1256857	Priory Street Sports and Community Centre More images	Q26548292
Numbers 11 and 13 and attached garden gates and railings	II	Priory Street	House	1858	24 June 1983	SE5991551520; 53°57′23″N 1°05′18″W	1256880	Numbers 11 and 13 and attached garden gates and railings More images	Q26548311
Gates, walls and railings to former churchyard of St Mary Bishophill Senior	II	Bishophill Senior	Gate	c. 1860	14 March 1997	SE6012951408; 53°57′19″N 1°05′07″W	1259553	Gates, walls and railings to former churchyard of St Mary Bishophill Senior More images	Q26550657
27, 29 and 31 George Hudson Street	II		House	c. 1860	23 April 1982	SE5998851714; 53°57′29″N 1°05′14″W	1257768	27, 29 and 31 George Hudson Street More images	Q26549094
The Grapes public house	II	4 King Street	Public house	c. 1860	14 March 1997	SE6033451632; 53°57′26″N 1°04′55″W	1257556	The Grapes public house More images	Q26548897
Number 5 and attached railings and gates	II	Priory Street	House	c. 1860	24 June 1983	SE5986151523; 53°57′23″N 1°05′21″W	1256873	Number 5 and attached railings and gates More images	Q26548304
The Bar Hotel	II	129 Micklegate	House	1861	24 June 1983	SE5977151472; 53°57′21″N 1°05′26″W	1257269	The Bar Hotel More images	Q26548653
York Baptist Church	II	Priory Street	Church	1862	14 March 1997	SE5983951499; 53°57′22″N 1°05′22″W	1256823	York Baptist Church More images	Q26548261
Wall, railings, gate and gate piers bounding churchyard of York Baptist Church	II	Priory Street	Wall	1862	14 March 1997	SE5982851521; 53°57′23″N 1°05′23″W	1256824	Wall, railings, gate and gate piers bounding churchyard of York Baptist Church More images	Q26548262
Numbers 1–5 (consecutive) and attached garden gates and railings	II	South Esplanade	House	c. 1865	14 March 1997	SE6036451420; 53°57′19″N 1°04′54″W	1256608	Numbers 1–5 (consecutive) and attached garden gates and railings More images	Q26548090
Grand Opera House	II	Clifford Street	Corn exchange	1868	28 February 1986	SE6031151625; 53°57′26″N 1°04′57″W	1257908	Grand Opera House More images	Q5594856
10 Pavement	II		House	c. 1870	14 March 1997	SE6049551750; 53°57′30″N 1°04′46″W	1256913	10 Pavement More images	Q26548337
Number 9 and railings and gate attached to front	II	Bishophill Junior	Vicarage	Late 19th century	14 March 1997	SE6000251493; 53°57′22″N 1°05′14″W	1259547	Number 9 and railings and gate attached to front More images	Q26550652
14A Fossgate	II		Workshop	Late 19th century	14 March 1997	SE6056551800; 53°57′32″N 1°04′42″W	1257812	Upload Photo	Q26549135
25 and 25A Fossgate	II		House	Late 19th century	14 March 1997	SE6057151746; 53°57′30″N 1°04′42″W	1257819	25 and 25A Fossgate More images	Q26549142
Varvils Court	II	36–38 Micklegate	House	Late 19th century	14 March 1997	SE5999351650; 53°57′27″N 1°05′14″W	1257366	Varvils Court More images	Q26548729
116 Micklegate	II		Shop	Late 19th century	19 August 1971	SE5980251551; 53°57′24″N 1°05′24″W	1257304	116 Micklegate More images	Q26548678
71 Walmgate	II		House	Late 19th century	24 June 1983	SE6082251541; 53°57′23″N 1°04′29″W	1256347	71 Walmgate More images	Q26547868
Brewery warehouse approximately 5 metres north west of number 18 (not included)	II	George Street	Maltings	c. 1875	14 March 1997	SE6074151508; 53°57′22″N 1°04′33″W	1257772	Brewery warehouse approximately 5 metres north west of number 18 (not included) More images	Q26549098
Bonding warehouse and attached walls, railings and gate piers	II	Skeldergate	Warehouse	1875	14 February 1977	SE6032851329; 53°57′16″N 1°04′56″W	1256638	Bonding warehouse and attached walls, railings and gate piers More images	Q26548118
Foss Bridge House	II	1–3 Walmgate	Shop	1878	14 March 1997	SE6059651665; 53°57′27″N 1°04′41″W	1256395	Foss Bridge House More images	Q26547911
Building attached to south west corner of Lady Anne Middleton's Hotel	II	Skeldergate	Manufactory	c. 1880	14 March 1997	SE6019551393; 53°57′18″N 1°05′03″W	1256599	Building attached to south west corner of Lady Anne Middleton's Hotel More images	Q26548081
Victoria Bar Chapel	II	Victor Street	Warehouse	1880	28 August 1991	SE6007251294; 53°57′15″N 1°05′10″W	1256394	Victoria Bar Chapel More images	Q26547910
12 Clifford Street	II		College	1883–1885	12 December 1978	SE6032551580; 53°57′24″N 1°04′56″W	1259238	12 Clifford Street More images	Q26550377
19 and 21 Clifford Street	II		Offices	1883 (No. 19) and 1887 (No. 21)	24 June 1983	SE6037751559; 53°57′24″N 1°04′53″W	1259241	19 and 21 Clifford Street More images	Q26550380
17 and 18 Fossgate	II		House	c. 1890	14 March 1997	SE6055351772; 53°57′31″N 1°04′43″W	1257814	17 and 18 Fossgate More images	Q26549137
114 Walmgate	II		House	c. 1890	14 March 1997	SE6092951509; 53°57′22″N 1°04′23″W	1256312	114 Walmgate More images	Q26547838
Magistrates' court and attached front wall, gates and railings	II	16 Clifford Street	Courthouse	1890–1892	24 June 1983	SE6034651523; 53°57′23″N 1°04′55″W	1259239	Magistrates' court and attached front wall, gates and railings More images	Q26550378
1 (part), 2, 3 and 4 Skeldergate	II		Shop	1892	14 March 1997	SE6010851609; 53°57′26″N 1°05′08″W	1256630	1 (part), 2, 3 and 4 Skeldergate More images	Q26548112
18, 20 and 22 Pavement	II		Public house	1893	24 June 1983	SE6049651794; 53°57′31″N 1°04′46″W	1256916	18, 20 and 22 Pavement More images	Q26548338
Rowntree Wharf	II	Navigation Road	Mill	1896	24 June 1983	SE6080251716; 53°57′29″N 1°04′30″W	1257088	Rowntree Wharf More images	Q26548497
The Other Tap and Spile public house	II	15 North Street	Public house	1896	14 March 1997	SE6009251725; 53°57′29″N 1°05′08″W	1257062	The Other Tap and Spile public house More images	Q26548478
11 and 12 Fossgate	II		House	1898	14 March 1997	SE6055451798; 53°57′31″N 1°04′43″W	1257810	11 and 12 Fossgate More images	Q26549133
Holy Trinity Rectory	II	81 Micklegate	Rectory	1898	14 March 1997	SE5989851570; 53°57′24″N 1°05′19″W	1257321	Holy Trinity Rectory More images	Q26548690
Numbers 1 and 2 Terry Memorial Homes	II	Skeldergate	House	1899	14 March 1997	SE6021351430; 53°57′20″N 1°05′02″W	1256605	Numbers 1 and 2 Terry Memorial Homes More images	Q26548087
19 and 21 Tanner Row, 22 George Hudson Street	II		Shop	1899	14 March 1997	SE6000151744; 53°57′30″N 1°05′13″W	1256472	19 and 21 Tanner Row, 22 George Hudson Street More images	Q26547983
Clifford Chambers (number 4)	II	2–10 Clifford Street	Shop	c. 1900	28 February 1986	SE6034051616; 53°57′26″N 1°04′55″W	1259273	Clifford Chambers (number 4) More images	Q26550410
Main gates and wicket gates to North Eastern Railway Company offices	II	Toft Green	Gate	c. 1900	20 December 1974	SE5989751722; 53°57′29″N 1°05′19″W	1256401	Main gates and wicket gates to North Eastern Railway Company offices More images	Q26547916
Former North Eastern Railway Company offices and area railings attached	II*	Toft Green	Offices	1900–1906	24 June 1983	SE5988451763; 53°57′31″N 1°05′20″W	1256400	Former North Eastern Railway Company offices and area railings attached More images	Q17549256
3, 5 and 7 Coppergate, 26 and 27 High Ousegate	II		Shop	1902	24 June 1983	SE6035651699; 53°57′28″N 1°04′54″W	1257632	3, 5 and 7 Coppergate, 26 and 27 High Ousegate More images	Q26548967
Annexe to Priory Street Sports and Community Centre and attached railings	II	Priory Street	School	1905	14 March 1997	SE5991251483; 53°57′22″N 1°05′18″W	1256861	Annexe to Priory Street Sports and Community Centre and attached railings More images	Q26548295
Galtres Chambers	II	2–6 Coppergate	Shop	1906	14 March 1997	SE6037451666; 53°57′27″N 1°04′53″W	1257941	Galtres Chambers More images	Q26549242
17 Bridge Street	II		Shop	1911	14 March 1997	SE6015551682; 53°57′28″N 1°05′05″W	1259353	17 Bridge Street More images	Q26550474
Numbers 19–22 (consecutive) and attached boundary wall	II	Fossgate	Cinema	1911	24 June 1983	SE6056051760; 53°57′30″N 1°04′43″W	1257815	Numbers 19–22 (consecutive) and attached boundary wall More images	Q26549138
1, 3 and 5 (Piccadilly Chambers)	II	Piccadilly	Bank	1915–1921	14 March 1997	SE6046451759; 53°57′30″N 1°04′48″W	1256910	1, 3 and 5 (Piccadilly Chambers) More images	Q26548334
War memorial in St Cuthbert's churchyard	II	Peasholme Green	War memorial	1921	22 August 2018	SE6076752031; 53°57′39″N 1°04′31″W	1455425	War memorial in St Cuthbert's churchyard More images	Q66479581
North Eastern Railway War Memorial	II*	Station Rise	War memorial	1924	10 September 1970	SE5982251779; 53°57′31″N 1°05′23″W	1256553	North Eastern Railway War Memorial More images	Q17549385
Turpin's grave approximately 50 metres from entrance to St George's churchyard	II	George Street	Headstone	Early 20th century	14 March 1997	SE6072451365; 53°57′17″N 1°04′34″W	1257777	Turpin's grave approximately 50 metres from entrance to St George's churchyard More images	Q26549103
Electricity sub station	II	Wellington Row	Electricity sub station	Early 20th century	14 March 1997	SE5998051890; 53°57′35″N 1°05′14″W	1256222	Electricity sub station More images	Q26547761
9 and 10 High Ousegate	II		Shop	1933	14 March 1997	SE6036151728; 53°57′29″N 1°04′54″W	1257623	9 and 10 High Ousegate More images	Q26548958

== See also ==
- Grade I listed buildings in North Yorkshire
- Grade II* listed buildings in North Yorkshire
