= Spread Eagle, York =

Listed former pub in York, England

Spread Eagle
- The former pub in 2023
- Interactive map of the Spread Eagle area
- Former names: Malt Shovel; Bricklayers Arms
- Alternative names: Yemen Heaven

General information
- Status: Converted to restaurant use
- Type: Public house (former)
- Location: 98 Walmgate, York, England
- Coordinates: 53.95637°N 1.07379°W
- Year built: Early 19th century
- Opening: 2022 (as a restaurant)
- Renovated: Mid-19th century and c. 1902 (altered) c. 2021 (converted)
- Closed: 2020 (as a pub)

Design and construction
- Designations

Listed Building – Grade II
- Official name: The Spread Eagle public house
- Designated: 14 March 1997
- Reference no.: 1256353

Website
- yemenheaven.com

The Spread Eagle is a Grade II listed former public house on Walmgate in York, England. A pub has stood on the site since the late 18th century, and the present building dates from the early 19th century, with later alterations in the mid‑19th century and around 1902. It was known as the Malt Shovel and the Bricklayers Arms before adopting the name Spread Eagle. The building was included in the Central Historic Core conservation area in 1968. After closing in 2020, it was converted for restaurant use and now operates as Yemen Heaven.

== History ==
A public house has been recorded on the site since the late 18th century. The present building on Walmgate dates from the early 19th century and was altered in the mid‑19th century, with further changes made around 1902. Earlier names included the Malt Shovel and the Bricklayers Arms before it became the Spread Eagle.

In 1968 the site was included within the newly established Central Historic Core conservation area, and on 14 March 1997, the Spread Eagle was designated a Grade II listed building.

In the mid‑1990s the upper floor of the pub housed Shylock's restaurant. In 2000 permission was granted for internal changes, including converting the first and second floors into residential accommodation. In 2015 the premises were used for auditions for the television talent show The X Factor. The pub closed in November 2020, and the Campaign for Real Ale (CAMRA) applied to have it listed as an asset of community value in an effort to retain it as a pub for local residents. The application was later withdrawn by CAMRA. In December 2021, during works to convert the building into a restaurant, the property was vandalised, and a local fundraising effort helped the owners with the resulting costs. The restaurant opened in February 2022 as Yemen Heaven and is now in operation.

== Architecture ==
The ground floor has a front framed by timber uprights with red brick between them, laid in an English garden‑wall pattern. The upper storeys are finished in stucco, with the first floor marked by shallow grooves, and the rear built in pink‑cream brick of the same bond. The front roof is tiled, the rear roof slated, with a brick chimney.

The building has three storeys and a single bay. At ground level a glazed and panelled door stands to the right of a central window with a segmental arch and four lights. The first floor has a shallow bow window with three four‑pane sashes set above a plain sill band, frieze and moulded top. On the second floor, wide‑framed four‑pane sashes flank a central panel in a moulded surround, with a raised band marking the floor level.

== See also ==
- Listed buildings in York (within the city walls, southern part)
