= Victoria Bar Chapel =

- The building in 2023

General information
- Status: Converted to residential use
- Type: Chapel (former)
- Location: Victor Street, York, England
- Coordinates: 53.95426°N 1.086070°W
- Year built: 1880; 146 years ago
- Renovated: 1995 (converted and altered)

Design and construction
- Designations

Listed Building – Grade II
- Official name: Victoria Bar Chapel
- Designated: 28 August 1991
- Reference no.: 1256394

Victoria Bar Chapel is a former Methodist church in the Bishophill area of York, in England.

The Primitive Methodist Church in York grew in the mid-19th century. Its congregation to the west of the city centre worshipped in a rented room on Nunnery Lane. In 1879, the church's York Circuit purchased land on the corner of Victor Street and Newton Terrace. A building was designed by William Peachey in the neo-Renaissance style. On completion in 1880, it could seat 900 worshippers. The room on Nunnery Lane became a Sunday school. In 1883, the York Circuit was divided in two, and the new chapel became head of the Victoria Bar Circuit. In 1932, the Primitive Methodists became part of the new Methodist Church of Great Britain, the church closing in 1939. In 1940 it was sold and became a furniture store, then later, a toy factory. In 1992, it again became a church, but it closed in 1995 and the building was converted into 17 flats. The building has been grade II listed since 1991.

The church is built of orange brick, on a plinth of red-orange brick, with details in grey bricks, some of which are moulded. The roofs are slate, and they have terracotta finials. The entrance front is two storeys high and five bays wide, with an apsidal form, the bays separated by pilasters. In front is a single-storey five-and-a-half bay range, and to its right is a one-and-a-half storey staircase turret, with a conical roof. Three of the entrance bays contain double doors with fanlights above, under round arches, and there is a further entrance in the left-hand bay. The front to Newton Terrace is two storeys high and six bays wide. Almost all the internal features were removed when the building was converted into flats, though a coved plaster ceiling survives.

== See also ==
- Listed buildings in York (within the city walls, southern part)
