= 77 Walmgate =

Listed building in York, England

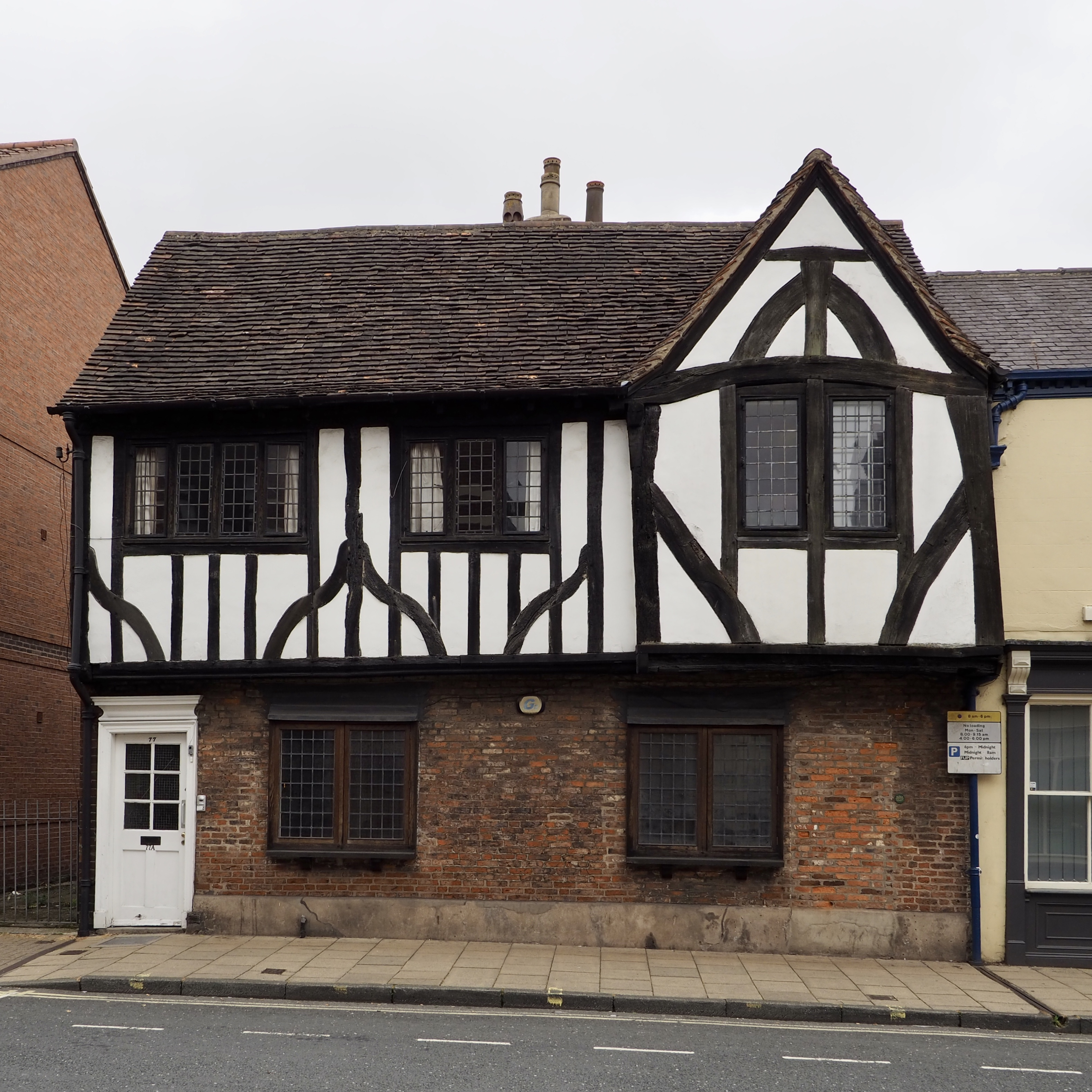
- 77 Walmgate in 2021

- Location within York City Centre

General information
- Location: Walmgate, York, England
- Coordinates: 53°57′23″N 1°04′27″W
- Years built: 15th century (cross wing); 16th century (hall range); Early 18th century (wing)
- Renovated: 19th and 20th centuries

Technical details
- Material: Timber framed
- Floor count: 2

Design and construction
- Designations

Listed Building – Grade II*
- Official name: 77, Walmgate
- Designated: 14 June 1954
- Reference no.: 1256351

77 Walmgate is a timber-framed building in the city centre of York, England.

The oldest part of the building is the 15th-century cross wing, the west part of the current building, with its gable end to Walmgate. A hall range was added in the 16th century, and this is the eastern part of the current building. Its timber frame is exposed, and its ogee braces are typical of the period. At some point, the ground floor was rebuilt in brick, but the upper floor is still jettied over it.

A wing was added at the rear in the early 18th century, and the building was altered in the 19th and 20th centuries. Inside, many historic features survive, including wooden panelling, a reset staircase, and a fireplace on the first floor.

The building was Grade II* listed in 1954. In 1957, it was purchased by the York Conservation Trust, who let it as a shop with a flat above.

== See also ==
- Grade II* listed buildings in the City of York
- Listed buildings in York (within the city walls, southern part)
