= The Corner Pin =

Listed pub in York, England

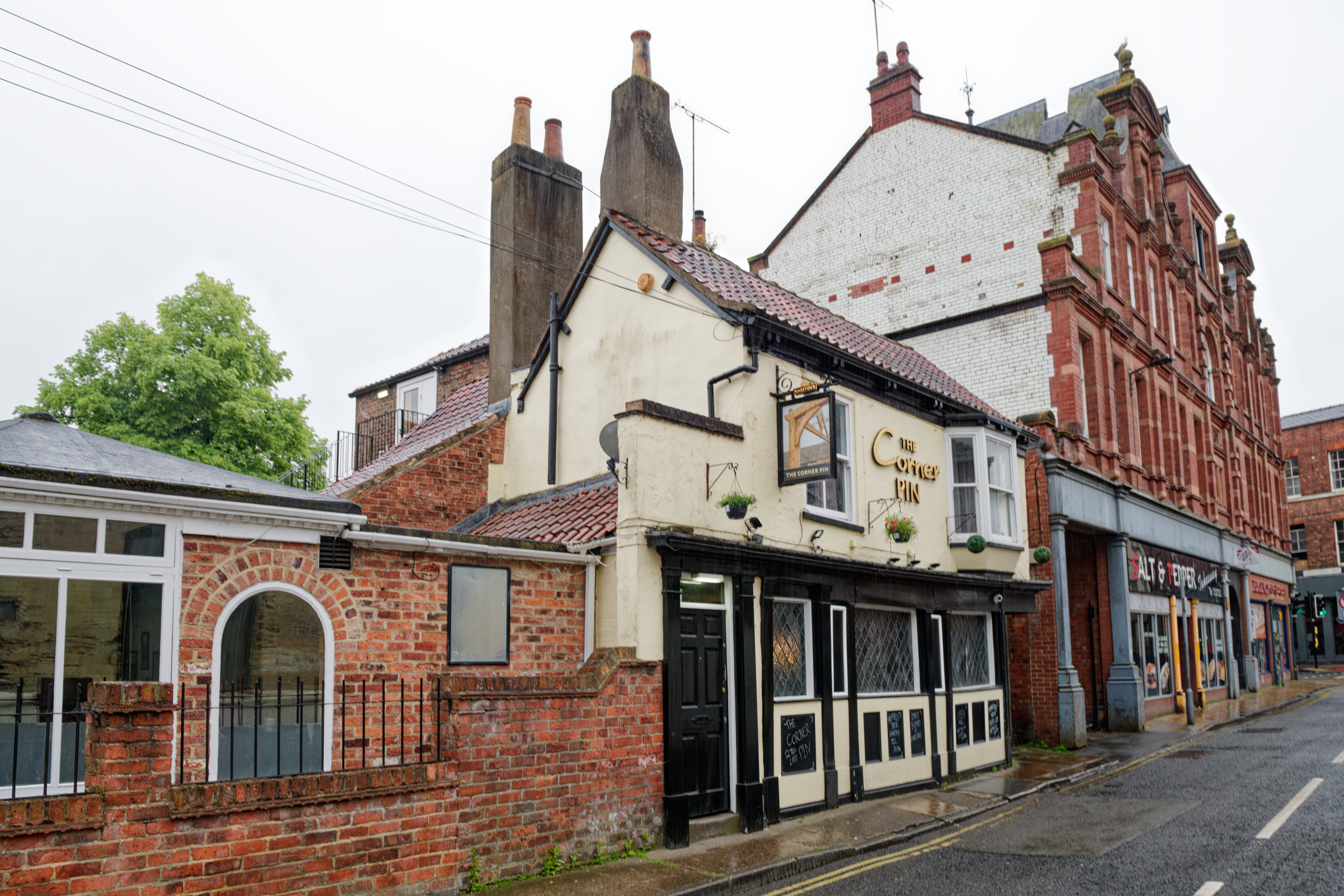
- The pub in 2024
- Interactive map of the The Corner Pin area
- Former names: The Unicorn; Oddfellows Arms

General information
- Type: Public house; originally a house
- Location: 17 Tanner Row, York, England
- Coordinates: 53.9584°N 1.0868°W
- Year built: Mid-18th century
- Renovated: Early 19th century (wing added); Mid-19th century (extended and altered); 20th century (extended)
- Owner: Marston's

Design and construction
- Designations

Listed Building – Grade II
- Official name: The Corner Pin
- Designated: 14 March 1997
- Reference no.: 1256471

Website
- cornerpinyork.co.uk

The Corner Pin is a Grade II listed public house on Tanner Row in York, England. The building originated as a mid‑18th‑century house and was later adapted for use as an inn, trading as The Unicorn by 1804 under successive owners and licensees. It was altered during the 19th and 20th centuries and was renamed The Corner Pin in 1985. As of June 2025, the freehold is owned by Marston's.

== History ==
The building on Tanner Row originated as a mid‑18th‑century house, and was enlarged and altered during the 19th and 20th centuries. By 1804 it was trading as The Unicorn, occupied by William Dale and owned by John Kilby, a brewer based on Tanner Row, indicating that the former dwelling had become an established inn by the early 19th century.

Pub sign in 2024

The 1851 directory of Kingston-upon-Hull and York records John Rogers at the Unicorn Inn, with the address given as No. 10, while the 1885 directory for York lists Joseph Dennison, a labourer, and David Young at the premises, with the address as No. 9. The 1913 Kelly's Directory of the North and East Ridings of Yorkshire records Thomas Joseph Betchetti at the Unicorn public house at No. 17. Local accounts suggest that the pub was for a period known as the Oddfellows Arms, though reverted to the Unicorn name in 1838 and 1841.

In 1968 the site was included within the newly established Central Historic Core conservation area. The pub became The Corner Pin in 1985. On 14 March 1997, it was designated a Grade II listed building. It stands next to Nos. 19 and 21, built in 1899 for the York Equitable Industrial Society and also Grade II listed. As of June 2025, the freehold is owned by Marston's.

== Architecture ==
The building is of brick covered in stucco, with a timber frontage on the ground floor and a tiled roof with rendered chimneys. It has two storeys and two windows across the front. The ground floor has a timber screen with simple uprights and a plain cornice, with a six‑panel door at the left and fixed lattice windows above panelled bases. On the upper floor, there is a small sash window to the left and a shallow bay window to the right with a central four‑pane sash.

=== Interior ===
The traditional part of the pub, where some original features survive, has three linked rooms arranged around a mid‑19th‑century panelled bar counter, while a modern conservatory opens onto the beer garden.

== See also ==
- Listed buildings in York (within the city walls, southern part)
