= 35 and 37 Walmgate =

Listed building in York, England

- The building in 2023
- Interactive map of the 35 and 37 Walmgate area
- Former names: City Arms (No. 37)

General information
- Type: House; now takeaway and restaurant
- Location: Walmgate, York, England
- Coordinates: 53.9569°N 1.0763°W
- Year built: c. 1740; 286 years ago
- Renovated: 1830–1840 (No. 37 sub-divided, converted and extended); Late 19th century (altered); 20th century (altered)
- Closed: Early 20th century (No. 37; as a pub)

Design and construction
- Designations

Listed Building – Grade II
- Official name: 35 and 37, Walmgate
- Designated: 14 March 1997
- Reference no.: 1256337

35 and 37 Walmgate is a Grade II listed building on Walmgate in York, England. Originating as a timber‑framed house, probably of 16th‑century date, it was rebuilt and altered several times, including a brick front and refitted interior around 1740 and further additions in the 19th century. Later in that century the frontage was remodelled with shop windows, and No. 37 was divided and converted into the City Arms public house, which remained in use into the early 20th century. By the time of its listing in 1997 the building was described as a shop with an electricity substation. Today Nos. 35–37 are occupied by a Korean takeaway and restaurant, respectively.

== History ==
The building at the corner of Walmgate and Dennis Street began as a timber-framed house, probably dating from the 16th century, with an early wing added to the south‑west. The front was rebuilt in brick and the interior refitted around 1740. Further additions were made in the early 19th century, including a wing behind the south‑east end facing Dennis Street. Later in the century the side facing Dennis Street was rebuilt and the front altered to incorporate shop windows. In this period No. 37 was divided and converted into the City Arms public house, with additional changes made through the 19th and 20th centuries. By the time of its listing in 1997 it was described as a shop with an electricity substation, following the stripping‑out of No. 37.

The 1851 directory of Kingston-upon-Hull and York records Thomas Agar at No. 35; there is no entry for No. 37. The Ordnance Survey map surveyed in 1851 and published the following year shows the City Arms public house, in the position corresponding to the present No. 37. The 1885 directory for York lists Charles Jackson at No. 35, a general shop, and John L. Webster at No. 37, the City Arms Inn. The pub appears on the 1891 Ordnance Survey map. The 1913 Kelly's Directory of the North and East Ridings of Yorkshire records George H. Harrison at the City Arms. The building no longer had the public house designation by the 1931 Ordnance Survey map.

In 1968 the site was included within the newly established Central Historic Core conservation area, and on 14 March 1997, Nos. 35–37 were designated a Grade II listed building. No. 35 is now occupied by a Korean takeaway, and No. 37 by a Korean restaurant, Little Asia. No. 37 was formerly the home of the restaurant Le Cochon Aveugle, which closed in 2022.

== Architecture ==
The building has a timber‑framed core. At ground level, No. 35 stands on a stone base with a timber shopfront, while No. 37 has a glazed‑brick frontage from its time as an inn. The upper storey is finished in incised render with a brick dentil band, and the extension to No. 37 is stuccoed. The roof is steeply pitched and slated.

No. 37's frontage in 2018

The front is two storeys with three upper windows. No. 35 has a shopfront with uprights supporting a fascia and moulded frieze, with a part‑glazed panelled door and divided overlight to the left of a plate‑glass window. The frontage to No. 37 has uprights with moulded faience capitals beneath a plain frieze and a fluted timber cornice on bulbous brackets with small gablets. Its four‑panel door, set to the right, has an overlight of coloured leaded glass; other openings are now boarded. The first‑floor windows are two‑light casements with divided transom lights above a raised band.

== See also ==
- Listed buildings in York (within the city walls, southern part)
