= 11 St Saviour's Place and 64 Aldwark =

Listed former pub in York, England

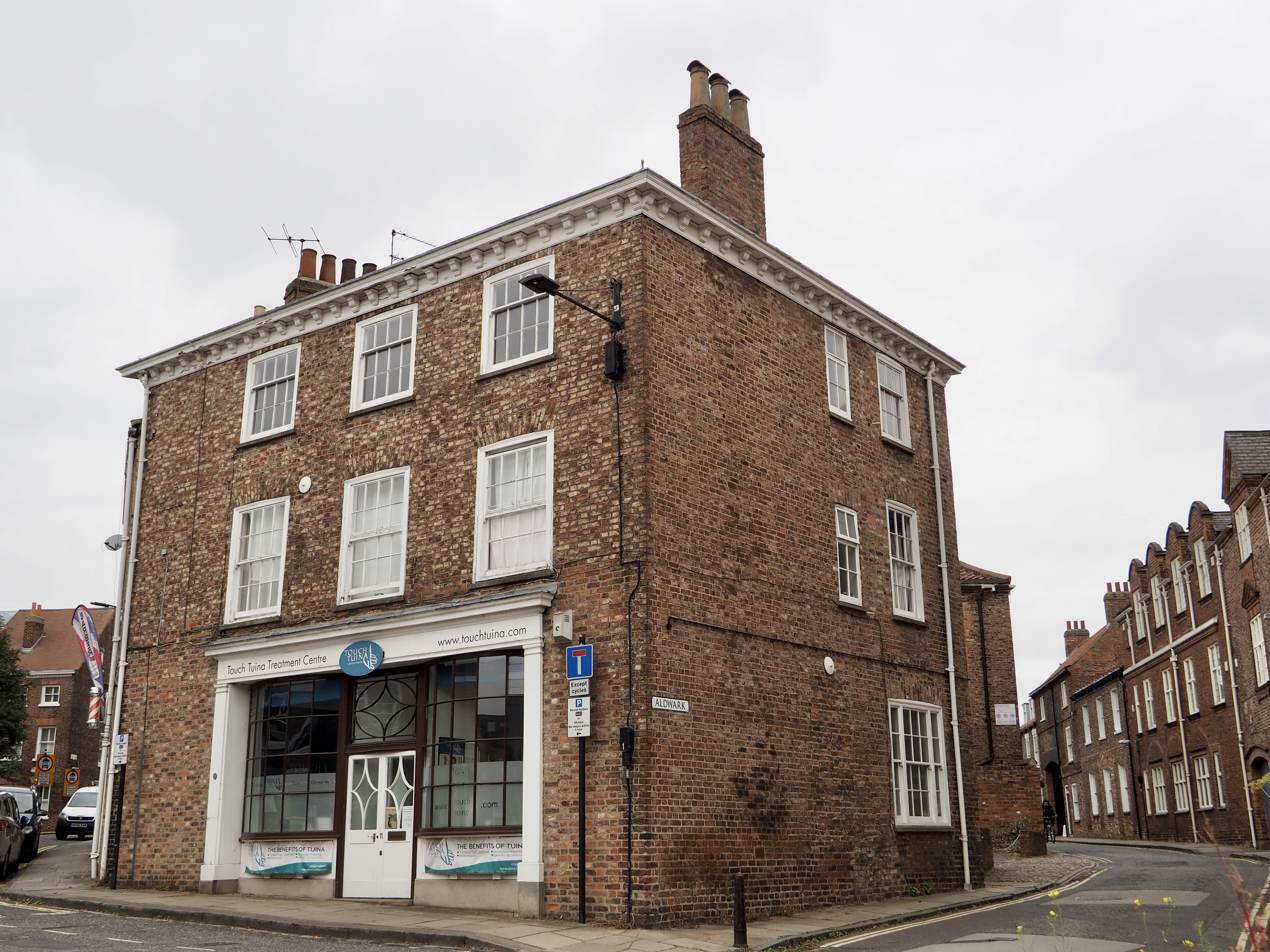
- The building in 2021
- Interactive map of the 11 St Saviour's Place and 64 Aldwark area
- Former names: Red Lion

General information
- Status: Converted to commercial use with flats above
- Type: Public house (former)
- Location: St Saviour's Place and Aldwark, York, England
- Coordinates: 53.9603°N 1.0762°W
- Year built: 1826; 200 years ago
- Renovated: 1962 (converted and remodelled)

Design and construction
- Designations

Listed Building – Grade II
- Official name: 64 Aldwark, 11 St Saviour's Place
- Designated: 20 March 1992
- Reference no.: 1256691

11 St Saviour's Place and 64 Aldwark is a Grade II listed former public house on the corner of St Saviour's Place and Aldwark in York, England. Built in 1826 as the Red Lion, it was converted to business use in 1962 and fitted with a shopfront brought from the Westminster Press Office on Fleet Street. It now houses a vintage clothing shop.

== History ==
The building on St Saviour's Place, with the listing also covering 64 Aldwark, was built in 1826 as the Red Lion public house.

Shopfront in 2026

It was extensively altered in 1962, when it was converted to business use and fitted with a reconstructed early‑20th‑century double shopfront originally from the Westminster Press Office on Fleet Street in London.

In 1968 the site was included within the newly established Central Historic Core conservation area, and on 20 March 1992, the building was designated a Grade II listed structure.

In May 2022, the commercial estate agents Stapleton Waterhouse reported that York Conservation Trust had appointed it to dispose of the freehold interest in the building. The property comprised six flats, two retail units and a rear car park, totalling 5,620 square feet (522 m^{2}), and was marketed at £1.625 million. As of February 2026, the building is occupied by a vintage clothing shop.

== Architecture ==
The building is of orange‑brown brick and has a timber shopfront with a simple cornice, and a hipped roof of slate with brick chimneys. It has three storeys and three bays, with a shopfront that includes half‑glazed double doors beneath a tall overlight and bowed multi‑pane windows on either side. The upper floors have sash windows, larger on the first floor and smaller on the second, set beneath the eaves. The Aldwark side has a similar three‑storey elevation with a modern ground‑floor window and a mix of sash windows above, all with renewed stone sills and shallow brick arches.

== See also ==
- Listed buildings in York (within the city walls, southern part)
