= 15 and 16 Fossgate =

Listed building in York, England

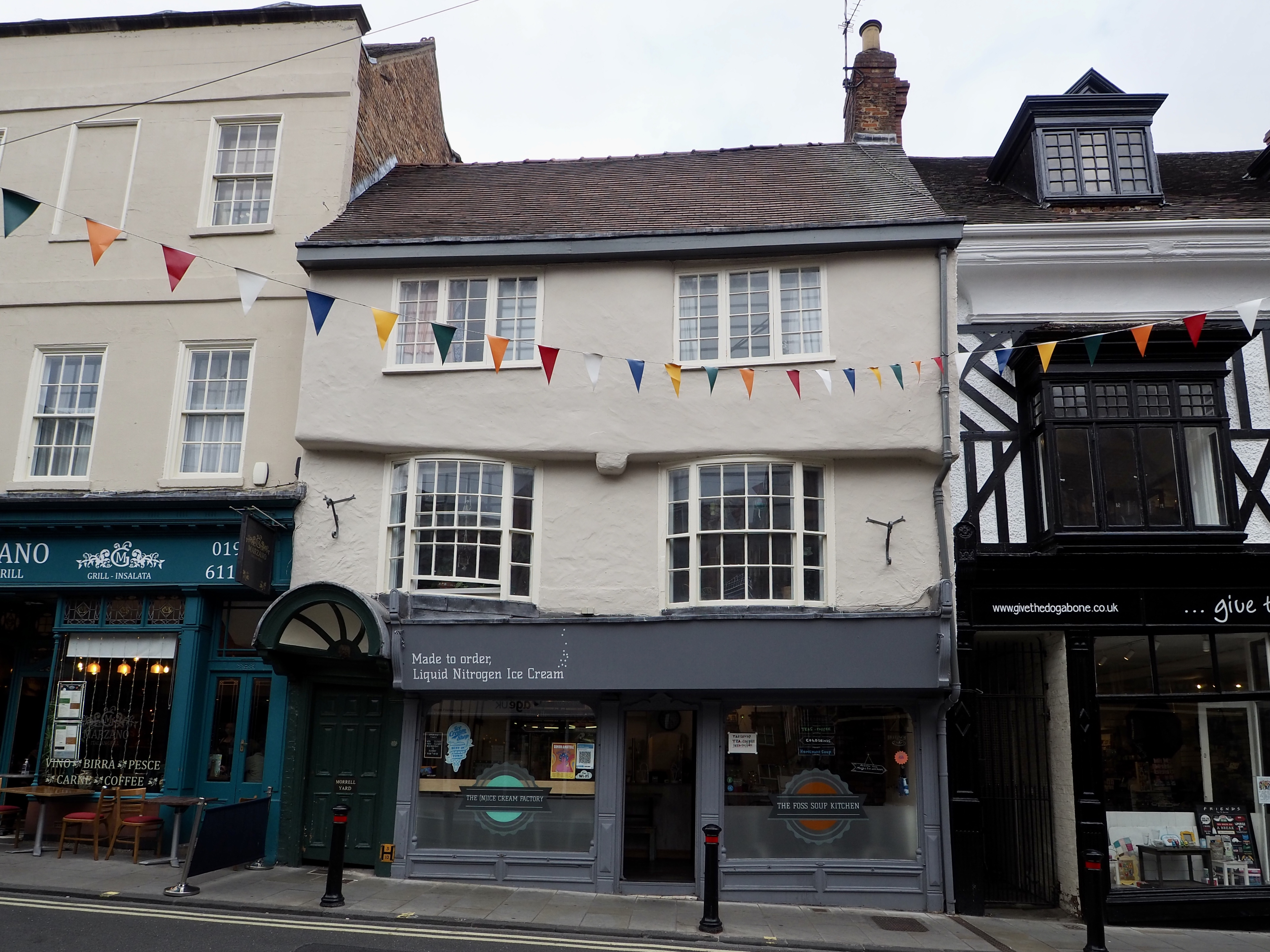
- The building in 2021
- Interactive map of the 15 and 16 Fossgate area
- Former names: 13 Fossgate

General information
- Status: Converted to retail use
- Type: House (former)
- Location: Fossgate, York, England
- Coordinates: 53°57′31″N 1°04′43″W
- Year built: c. 1600
- Renovated: Late 17th century (altered and rear wing); Late 19th century (shopfront); 20th century (altered)

Design and construction
- Designations

Listed Building – Grade II
- Official name: 15 and 16, Fossgate
- Designated: 14 June 1954
- Reference no.: 1257813

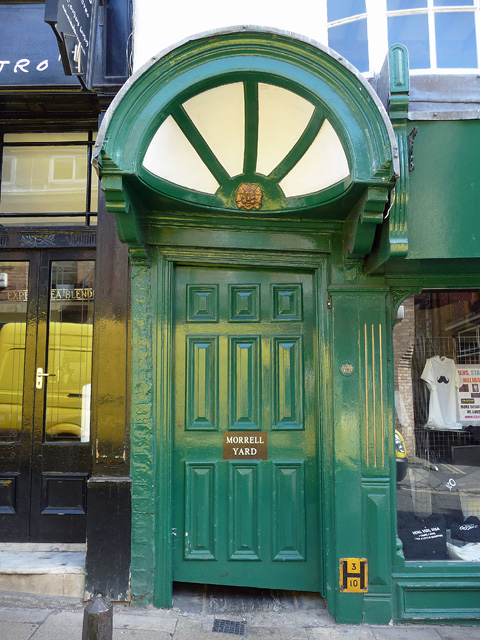
The hooded door in 2013

15 and 16 Fossgate is a historic building in the city centre of York, England.

The building was constructed as a house in about 1600. It is timber-framed, and both upper floors are jettied to the Fossgate front. It was originally one room deep, with a staircase behind, but in the late 17th century a brick wing was added at the rear. This has at times served as a separate tenement, known as "Morrell Yard". It is accessed through a passage on the left side of the ground floor, which has a door with a late-17th-century hood. Inside the building, some timber framing is visible on the ground floor, and there is a rebuilt brick fireplace. The building was Grade II listed in 1954. It currently houses a shop.

== See also ==
- Listed buildings in York (within the city walls, southern part)
