= 10 and 12 Low Ousegate =

Listed building in York, England

- The building in 2023
- Interactive map of the 10 and 12 Low Ousegate area
- Former names: 16 Low Ousegate

General information
- Status: Converted to public house (No. 10) and bakery (No. 12)
- Type: Houses with shops (former)
- Location: Low Ousegate, York, England
- Coordinates: 53.9577°N 1.0830°W
- Year built: 1810–1820; 206 years ago
- Renovated: Mid-19th century (shopfront; No. 10); 20th century (shopfront; No. 12)
- Owner: Mitchells & Butlers (No. 10); Cooplands (No. 12)

Design and construction
- Designations

Listed Building – Grade II
- Official name: 10 Low Ousegate
- Designated: 14 June 1954
- Reference no.: 1257450

Listed Building – Grade II
- Official name: 12, Low Ousegate
- Designated: 24 June 1983
- Reference no.: 1257450

10 and 12 Low Ousegate is a Grade II listed pair of buildings on Low Ousegate in York, England. Built between 1810 and 1820 as two houses with shops and formerly numbered 16, they stand on elongated medieval plots later renumbered to form the modern Nos. 10 and 12. No. 10 has a mid‑19th‑century shopfront and is occupied by the pub chain O'Neill's, while No. 12 has a 20th‑century shopfront and is used by a branch of Cooplands bakery.

== History ==
The building, formerly numbered 16, was built between 1810 and 1820 as a pair of houses with shops on Low Ousegate, with a mid‑19th‑century shopfront to No. 10 and a 20th‑century shopfront to No. 12. The historic numbering does not correspond to the modern sequence: the former No. 16 occupied the two adjoining plots now numbered 10 and 12. Although the street was redeveloped in the early 19th century, the elongated, narrow plots of Nos. 10–12 continue to follow boundary lines established in the medieval era.

The 1851 directory of Kingston-upon-Hull and York records Joseph Hillyard, wine and spirit merchant, at No. 16. The 1885 directory for York again lists Hillyard at No. 16, and also records William Sessions, a printer, publisher, bookseller and stationer, and J. G. A. Hillyard, a solicitor, at Nos. 15–16. The 1913 Kelly's Directory of the North and East Ridings of Yorkshire records Joseph Hillyard & Son at No. 16.

No. 10 was designated a Grade II listed building on 14 June 1954, and No. 12 was first listed on 24 June 1983; in 1968 the site was included within the newly established Central Historic Core conservation area. The pair stand between Nos. 4–8 and No. 14, all Grade II listed. No. 10 is occupied by the pub chain O'Neill's, and as of January 2026 its freehold is owned by Mitchells & Butlers. No. 12 is used by a branch of Cooplands bakery.

== Architecture ==
No. 10 is built of orange brick and No. 12 of brown brick, both in a similar brick pattern, with simple brick arches over the windows and a stone cornice below a slate roof. The front has four storeys and four windows. A central doorway with panelled doors and a fanlight above, reached by stone steps, leads through to the rear yard.

No. 10's shopfront in 2018

To the left is a shopfront with plain pilasters, a simple frieze and cornice, and a blind box above. Its door has margin glazing and panels, set between two small bow windows with arched tops, thin glazing bars and panelled bases. On the first floor, No. 10 has two windows with uneven panes and No. 12 has two eight‑pane windows; above them both houses have nine‑pane windows on the second floor and short six‑pane windows on the third, all with sills and flat heads.

The rear yard of No. 10 is partly occupied by a flat‑roofed infill and a glazed conservatory, providing access to a pitched‑roof building behind.

=== Interior ===
Internally, No. 10 has been heavily altered; at ground‑floor level many partitions have been removed to form an open trading space. The upper floors retain more of their original plan.

== See also ==
- Listed buildings in York (within the city walls, southern part)
