= 34 St Saviourgate =

Listed building in York, England

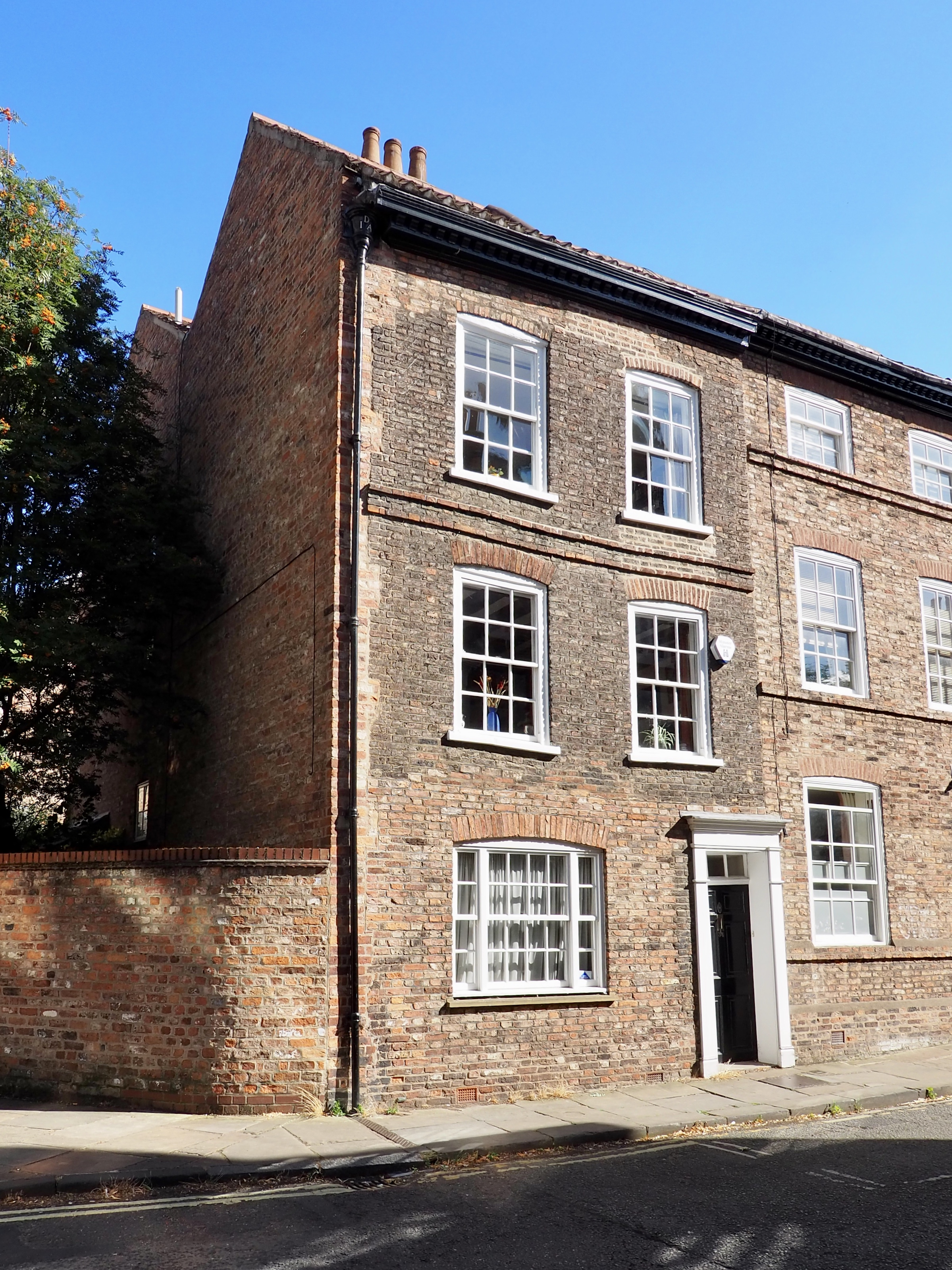
- The building in 2022
- Interactive map of the 34 St Saviourgate area

General information
- Type: House
- Location: St Saviourgate, York, England
- Coordinates: 53.9603°N 1.0770°W
- Year built: Mid-15th century
- Renovated: 16th century (storey added); Mid-18th century (remodelled); 20th century (left return rebuilt)

Listed Building – Grade II
- Official name: 34, St Saviourgate
- Designated: 14 June 1954
- Reference no.: 1256704

34 St Saviourgate is a Grade II listed building on St Saviourgate in the city of York, England.

The house was constructed in the mid-15th century, probably for Thomas Bracebrig, who built a terrace of three houses between 1443 and 1465. It was originally a two-storey timber-framed building, four bays deep. In the 16th century, a jettied third storey was added to the building. The house was extensively remodelled in the mid-18th century, the timber framing being encased in brick, the top floor being cut back, and a chimney added. The external left wall was rebuilt in the 20th century. The house was Grade II listed in 1954.

The house is externally of brown brick, with a timber doorway and cornice, and a pantile roof of an "M" shape with two brick chimneystacks in the valley. It is three storeys high and two bays wide, and has sash windows to front and rear, those at the front under arches. At the right end is a drainpipe, the head of which is dated 1780. Inside, the first floor rear room has a blocked 15th-century doorway with an ogee head. The timber framing of the north side wall largely survives, as do some other posts. Part of a 16th-century roof truss survives. There is also an early staircase and the ground floor rear fireplace has a large timber lintel.

== See also ==
- Listed buildings in York (within the city walls, southern part)
