= Dorothy Wilson's Hospital =

Listed house in York, England

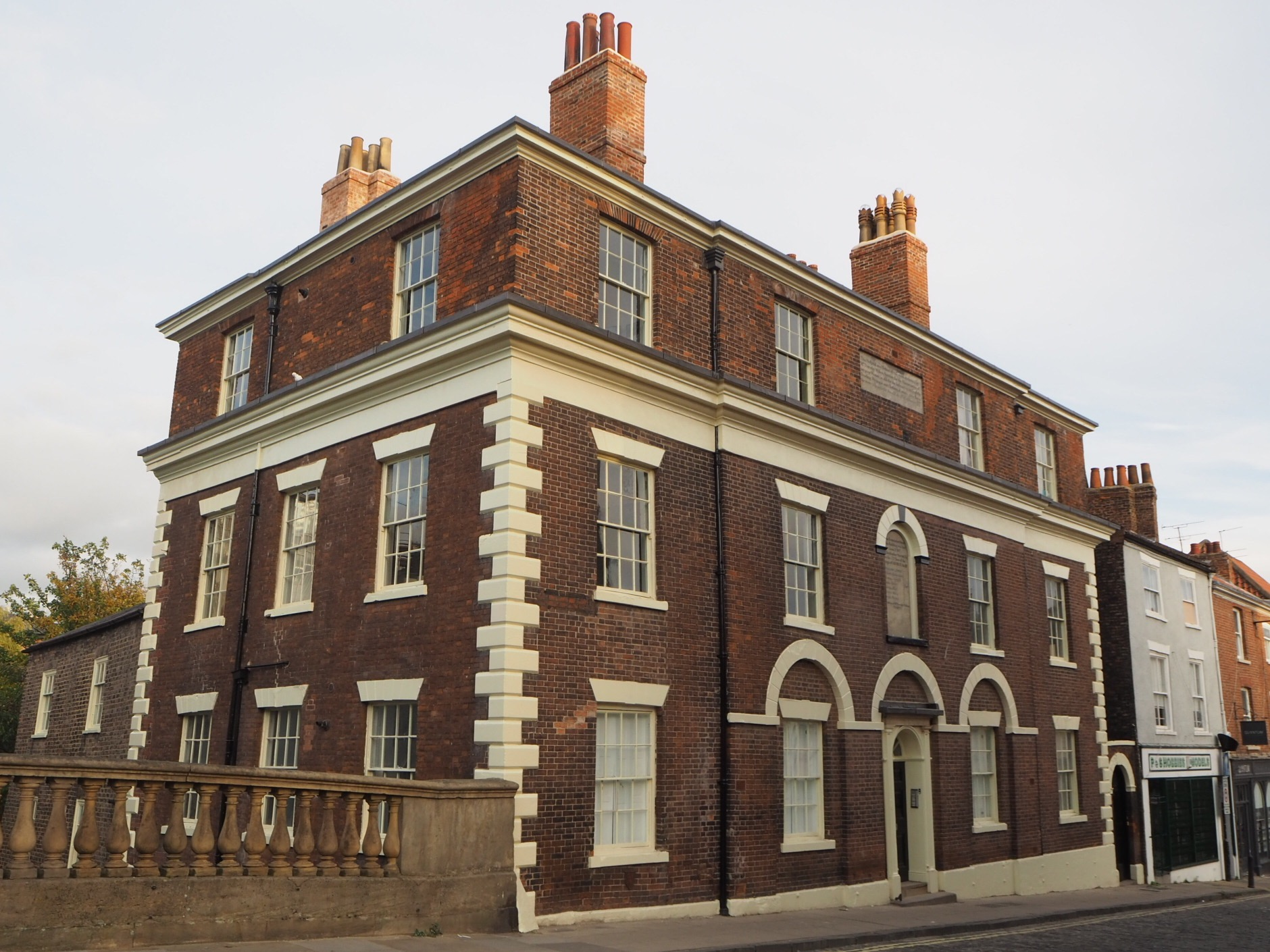
- The building in 2018

- Location within York City Centre

General information
- Type: Almshouse and schoolmaster's house
- Location: 2 Walmgate, York, England
- Coordinates: 53.9577°N 1.0777°W
- Years built: 1765 (almshouse); 1805 (schoolmaster's house)
- Renovated: 1812 (almshouse extensively rebuilt); 1958 (buildings modernised)

Listed Building – Grade II
- Official name: Dorothy Wilson's Hospital and attached cottage
- Designated: 14 June 1954
- Reference no.: 1256398

Dorothy Wilson's Hospital is a historic almshouse in the city centre of York, England.

Dorothy Wilson, who died in 1717, left money for the establishment of an almshouse for ten poor women, and a school for twenty poor boys. This was set up in 1719, in her former house, on Walmgate, by the River Foss. The building was replaced in 1765, and rebuilt again in 1812, reusing some materials. In 1810, a schoolmaster's house was built behind the property. The school operated until 1895. In 1958, the building was modified to offer two-room flats, and it continues to operate as an almshouse. The building was Grade II listed in 1954. In 2011, the charity operating it merged with the Ellen Wilson Hospital Charity, to form the Ellen and Dorothy Wilson Almshouse Charity.

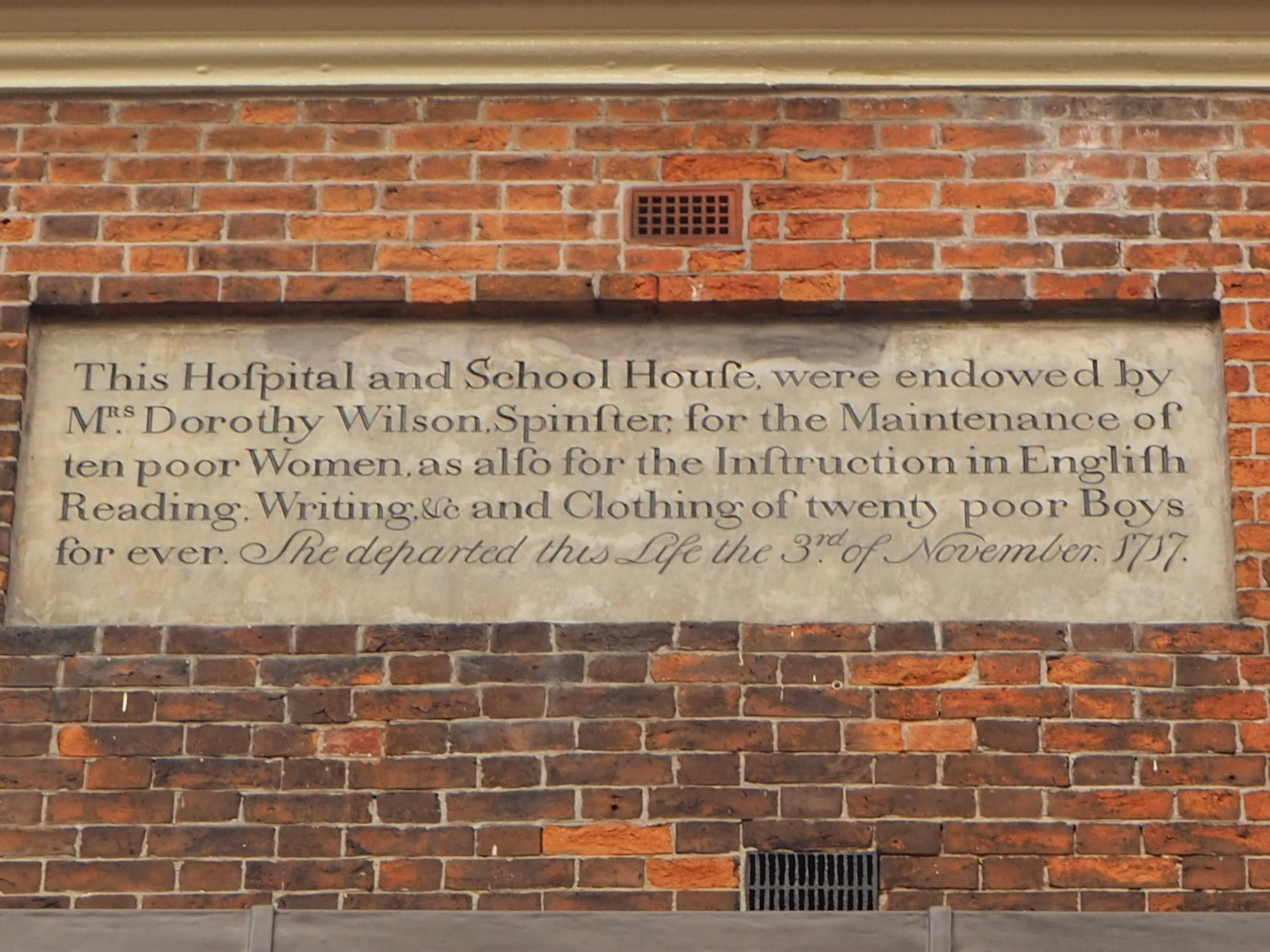
The 18th-century inscription

The three-storey building is constructed of brick, and is five bays wide. An inscription above the door marks the rebuilding of 1812, while an inscription at second floor level commemorates the original establishment of the institution. The staircase has been rebuilt, but incorporates balusters from the original stairs. Several original doors to rooms and cupboards survive. In general, the building is plain and undecorated inside. The York Georgian Society describes it as "notable for its fine brickwork and elegant details such as chamfered quoins, arcaded arches, and a majestic cornice". The schoolmaster's house is of two storeys, with a central porch.

== See also ==
- Listed buildings in York (within the city walls, southern part)
