= 33–37 Micklegate =

Listed building in York, England

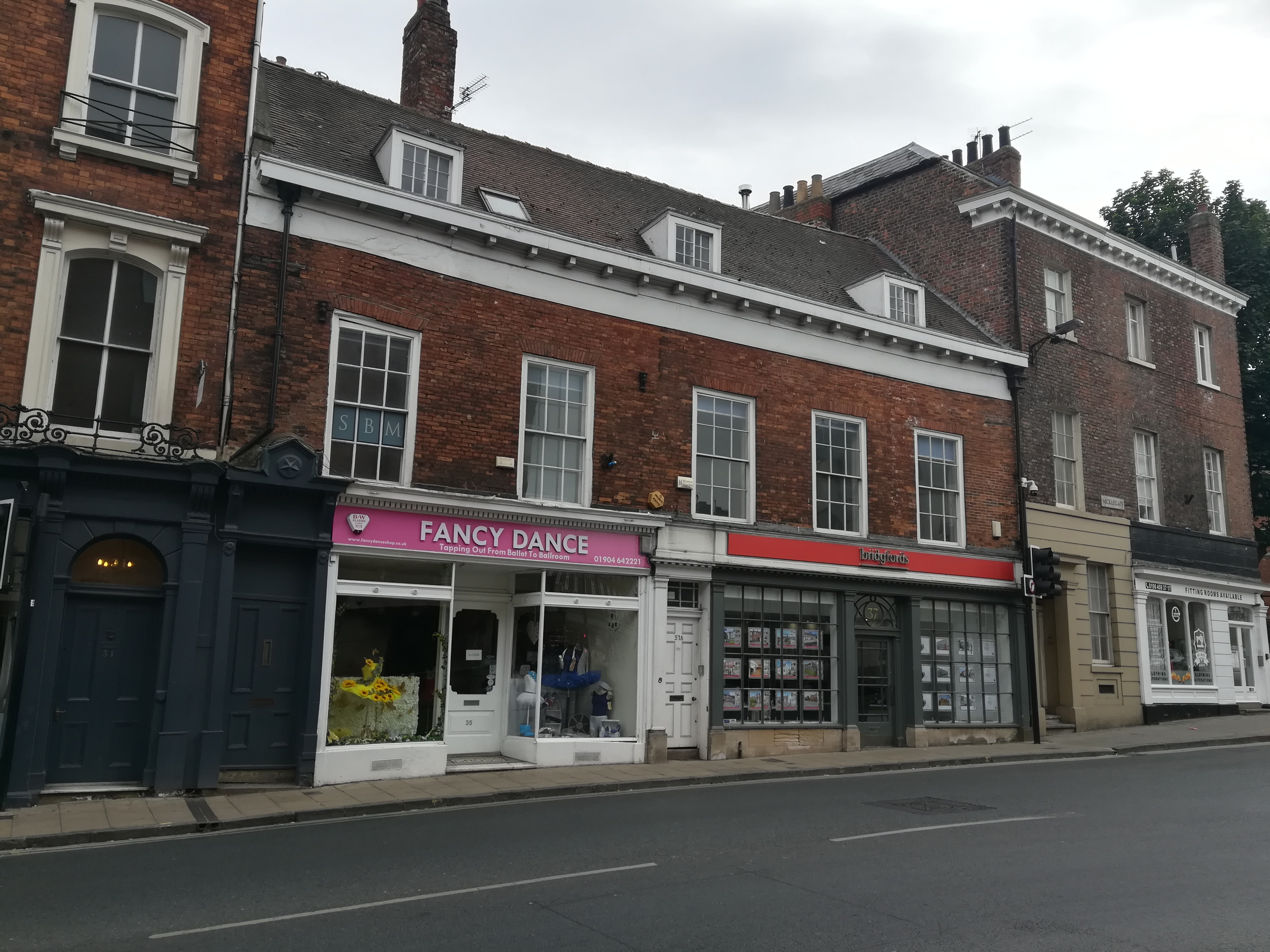
- The building in 2018
- Interactive map of the 33–37 Micklegate area

General information
- Status: Converted to commercial use
- Type: House (former)
- Location: Micklegate, York, England
- Coordinates: 53°57′26″N 1°05′12″W
- Completed: Late 17th century
- Renovated: Early 18th century (remodelled) c. 1812 (subdivided and altered); Late 19th century (altered)

Technical details
- Floor count: 2 + attic

Design and construction
- Designations

Listed Building – Grade II*
- Official name: 33, 35 and 37, Micklegate
- Designated: 19 August 1971
- Reference no.: 1257364

33–37 Micklegate is a historic building in the city centre of York, England.

The building lies on Micklegate, one of the major streets in the city centre. A large stone house was first recorded on the site in 1230: a hall with two cellars below, and smaller houses behind. In the late 17th century, a new structure was built on the rear part of the site, and this forms the oldest part of the current building, a two-storey, L-shaped block constructed of brick. This was constructed when the property was owned by the Wharton family, and is believed to be the work of Anthony Wharton.

In the early 18th century, the front part of the current building was constructed, a two-storey block with attics, which is five bays wide. The architect Peter Atkinson bought the property in 1812. He added a third storey to the east wing, added a new staircase hall, and divided the property in two. He lived in the larger portion, later No. 37, and leased out the smaller one. By the late 1820s, Atkinson was also leasing out his former home, initially to the newspaper owner William Hargrove.

In the late 19th century, the east wall of the south wing was altered, with a new entrance created, and most of the windows remodelled, although a now-blocked 17th-century oval window survives. Original windows survive in the rear elevation. The whole of the ground floor is now occupied by three shops, with 20th-century shopfronts. The eaves on the Micklegate front have also been remodelled. The building was Grade II* listed in 1971.

Inside, on the first floor of No. 33, full-height 18th-century panelling survives in the front room and some original plasterwork. In the rear room on the same floor, there is full-height 17th-century panelling, a blocked fireplace and an original door. The staircase has been altered, but retains 17th-century balusters and, in the attic, its original handrail. No. 37 retains Atkinson's staircase, a marble fireplace and plasterwork in the front room on the first floor, and in the rear room on the top floor, a frieze showing Greek characters playing musical instruments.

== See also ==
- Grade II* listed buildings in the City of York
- Listed buildings in York (within the city walls, southern part)
