= 25 and 25A Fossgate =

Listed building in York, England

- The building in 2025
- Former names: Chico's Café
- Alternative names: Fossgate Social

General information
- Status: In commercial use with accommodation above
- Type: House with shop (former)
- Location: Fossgate, York, England
- Coordinates: 53.9583°N 1.0784°W
- Year built: Late 19th century

Design and construction
- Designations

Listed Building – Grade II
- Official name: 25 and 25A, Fossgate
- Designated: 14 March 1997
- Reference no.: 1257819

Website
- thefossgatesocial.com

25 and 25A Fossgate is a Grade II listed building on Fossgate in York, England, originally constructed as a house with a ground‑floor shop. It was added to the Central Historic Core conservation area in 1968. No. 25 has operated as the Fossgate Social café-bar since 2014, while No. 25A is a flat on the upper floors.

== History ==
The building on Fossgate was constructed in the late 19th century as a house with a ground-floor shop.

In 1968 the site was included within the newly established Central Historic Core conservation area, and on 14 March 1997, Nos. 25–25A was designated a Grade II listed building. It stands next to No. 23, which is also Grade II listed.

In 2014 No. 25 opened as the café-bar the Fossgate Social, having previously operated as Chico's Café, and it functions as a daytime café while serving craft beer and cocktails in the evening. No. 25A is a flat on the upper floors, though it is not clear whether it uses both.

== Architecture ==
The front is built of white brick, with timber guttering, while the left side is in red brick and the right side is rendered. The roof is slate with a brick chimney at the right end. The building has three storeys and a single window on the front elevation. The ground floor has a simple shopfront with pilasters, a frieze and a shallow projecting cornice, with a glazed and panelled door set back between plate‑glass windows.

On the first floor there is a canted bay window with single‑pane sashes and a small roof, with the sills forming a raised band across the façade. The second‑floor windows are round‑headed single‑pane sashes with sills on brackets that continue as a band. At the eaves is a moulded gutter box supported on shaped brackets. Access to No. 25A is through a panelled door in Straker's Passage, set within a pilastered doorcase with a flat hood on scrolled consoles.

== See also ==
- Listed buildings in York (within the city walls, southern part)
