= 112 Micklegate =

Listed former pub in York, England

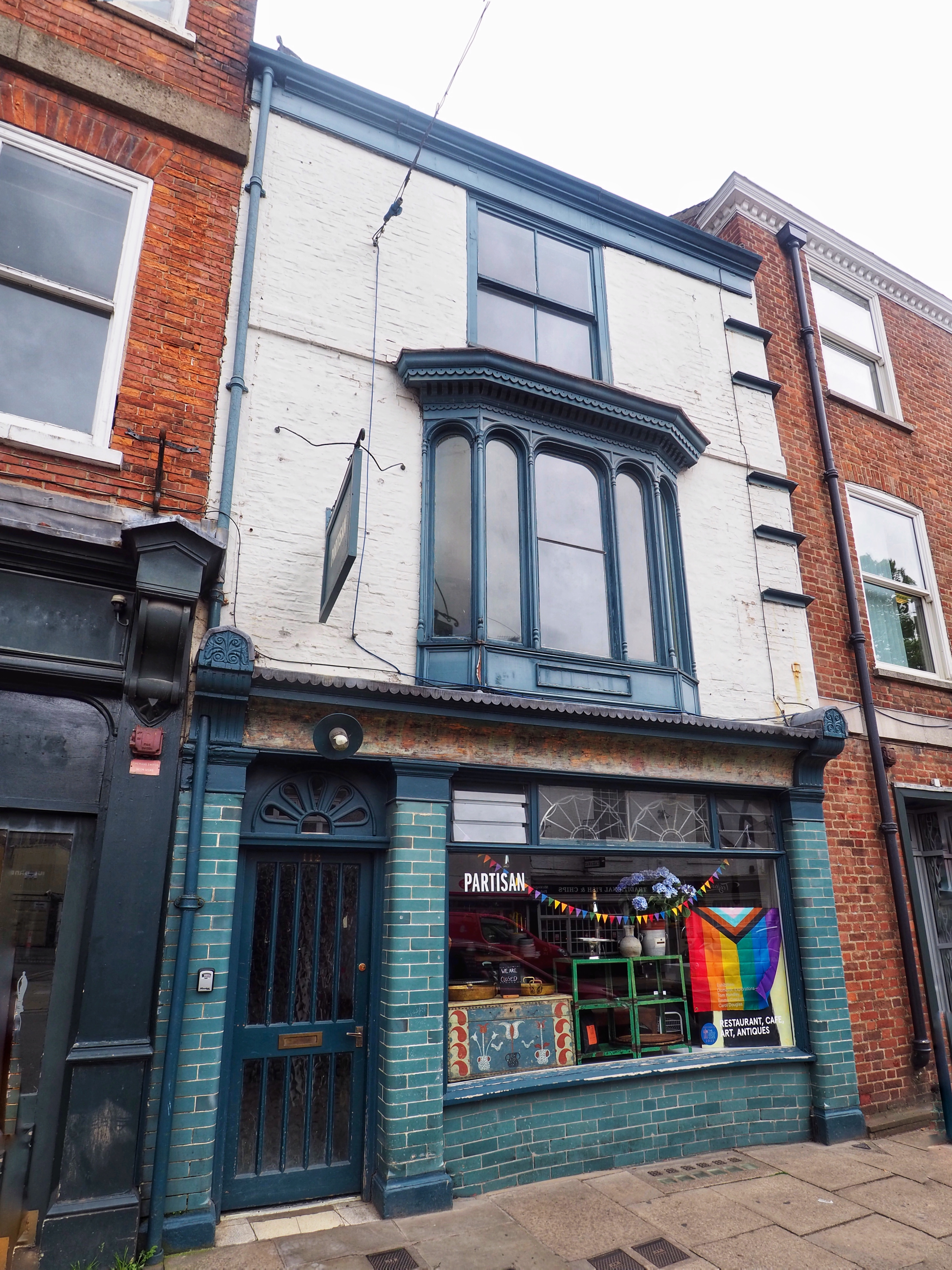
- The building in 2024
- Interactive map of the 112 Micklegate area
- Former names: Red Lion

General information
- Status: Converted to café-restaurant use with holiday accommodation above
- Type: Public house (former); originally a house
- Location: Micklegate, York, England
- Coordinates: 53.9571°N 1.0862°W
- Year built: Early 16th century
- Renovated: 1745–1748 (partly rebuilt and refronted); 1860–1870 (refenestrated and shopfronts)

Design and construction
- Designations

Listed Building – Grade II
- Official name: 112, Micklegate
- Designated: 17 August 1971
- Reference no.: 1257361

Website
- partisanuk.com

112 Micklegate is a Grade II listed former public house on Micklegate in York, England. Originating as a house in the early 16th century, it was rebuilt and refronted in the mid‑18th century and later altered with a 19th‑century front, by which time it had become known as the Red Lion. The pub closed in 1939, and the building is now used as a café-restaurant with holiday accommodation above.

== History ==
Standing on Micklegate, the building began as a house in the early 16th century. It was partly rebuilt and given a new front between 1745 and 1748, as recorded in the vicars choral's leases. Further changes were made in the mid‑19th century, when the windows were renewed and a shopfront-style frontage was added. By this period the property had taken on the name and function of the Red Lion, as shown by successive trade directories.

The 1851 directory of Kingston-upon-Hull and York records James Snowden at the Red Lion, with the address given as No. 64, while the 1885 directory for York lists Joseph Graham at the Red Lion Inn at the same address. The 1913 Kelly's Directory of the North and East Ridings of Yorkshire records Eli Plimmer at the Red Lion at No. 112.

The premises closed in 1939, and the licence was transferred to the Winning Post on Bishopthorpe Road. In 1968 the site was included within the newly established Central Historic Core conservation area, and on 24 June 1983, No. 112 was designated a Grade II listed building. It stands beside No. 114, a late-17th-century building that is also Grade II listed. The ground floor of No. 112 is now occupied by Partisan, a café-restaurant, while the upper floors have been adapted for use as holiday apartments.

== Architecture ==
The building has a timber structure with a later front of painted brick. It has a hipped roof of slate with a timber band at the eaves, corner brackets with a curled profile, and brick chimneys.

The front has three storeys and a single window bay. The ground floor shopfront is built in painted brick, with simple uprights and shaped tops, and a shallow fascia supported by grooved brackets and finished with small rounded gables. A modern glazed door stands to the left of a large display window set above a panelled base.

On the first floor, a five‑sided bay window projects outward, with small arched panes supported on slender shafts and a decorative band beneath. Above it is a shaped frieze and a cornice with dentil and scalloped detailing. The second floor has a single four‑pane sash window. A narrow raised brick band runs across the front at second‑floor level.

== See also ==
- Listed buildings in York (within the city walls, southern part)
