= The Grapes, York =

Listed pub in York, England

The Grapes
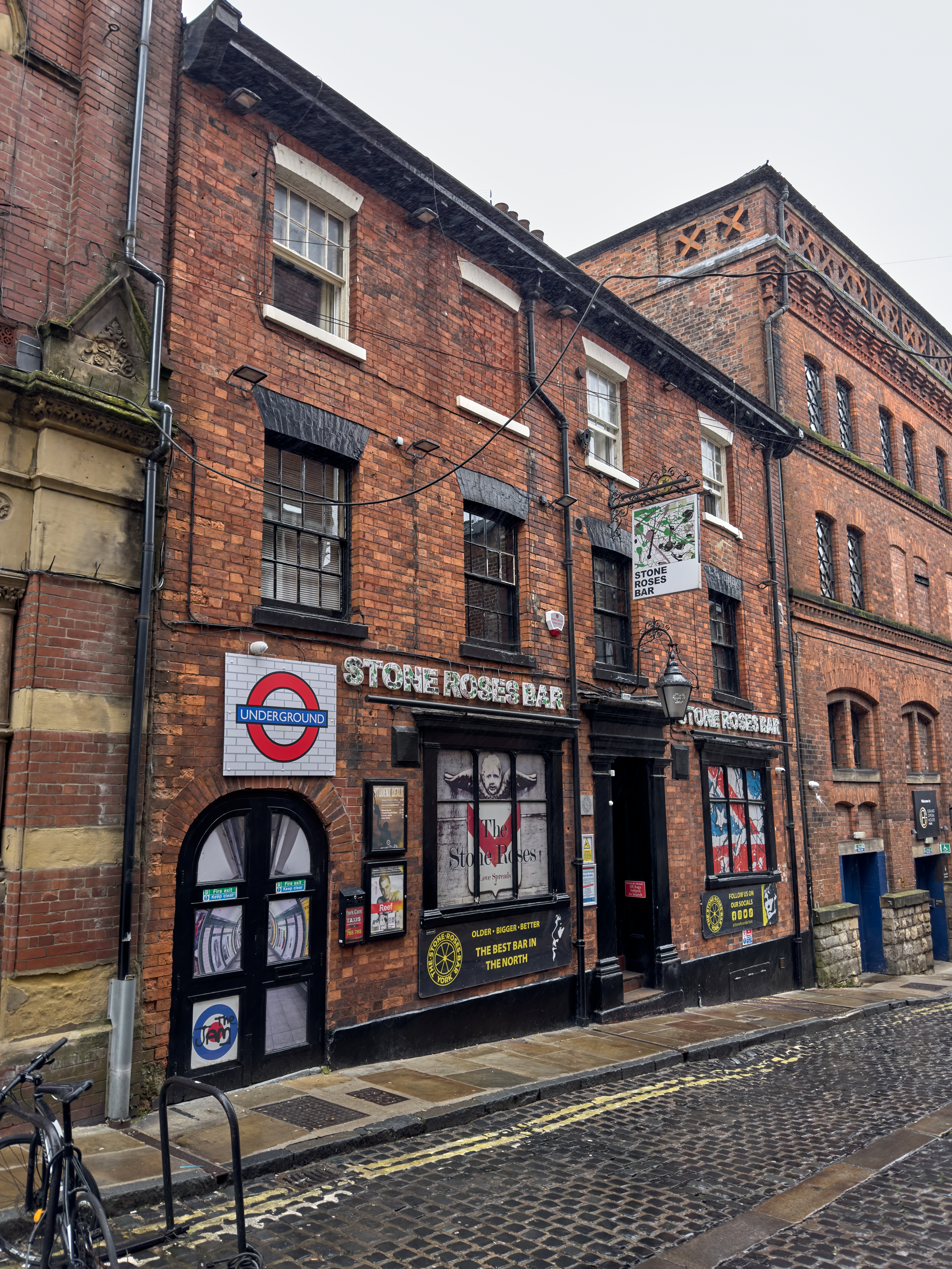
- The pub in 2024
- Interactive map of the The Grapes area
- Alternative names: Stone Roses Bar

General information
- Type: Public house
- Location: 4 King Street, York, England
- Coordinates: 53.9573°N 1.0821°W
- Year built: c. 1860
- Owner: Thwaites

Design and construction
- Designations

Listed Building – Grade II
- Official name: The Grapes public house
- Designated: 14 March 1997
- Reference no.: 1257556

Website
- thestonerosesbaryork.co.uk

The Grapes, now trading as the Stone Roses Bar, is a Grade II listed public house on King Street in York, England. The building dates from around 1860 and has undergone later internal alterations. It was included in the Central Historic Core conservation area in 1968. The Grapes closed at an unrecorded date, and in 2004 the premises became the Stone Roses Bar, themed around the 1990s Madchester and indie scene. As of July 2025, the freehold is owned by Thwaites.

== History ==
The building is a public house on King Street, dating from around 1860 and altered internally at later periods.

In 1968, the site was included within the newly established Central Historic Core conservation area, and on 14 March 1997, The Grapes was designated a Grade II listed building. The pub remained in operation at that time but closed at an unrecorded date. In 2004 the premises became the Stone Roses Bar, themed around the 1990s Madchester and indie scene, with artwork, memorabilia and music celebrating well‑known British acts from that period, including groups such as the Stone Roses, Oasis and David Bowie. As of July 2025, the pub's freehold is owned by Thwaites Brewery.

== Architecture ==
The building is of orange brick on a painted stone base, with timber surrounds to the door and ground‑floor windows, and a shaped frieze and cornice at the eaves supported on large brackets. It has brick chimneys and a slate roof. It was planned with a central entrance.

The front has three storeys and four windows. A cellar opening sits in the plinth to the right of the original doorway. The present entrance is through a round‑arched passage at the left end, fitted with a boarded door. The original doorway, reached by steps, has a plain door set back within panelled reveals and framed by simple pilasters with moulded details and a shaped frieze and cornice.

The ground‑floor windows on either side are three‑light openings with timber mullions and transoms, set in pilastered frames with sills and cornice hoods. The upper floors have 16‑pane sash windows with painted stone sills and shallow brick arches; one of the second‑floor windows has been blocked.

== See also ==
- Listed buildings in York (within the city walls, southern part)
