= 26 Coppergate =

Listed building in York, England

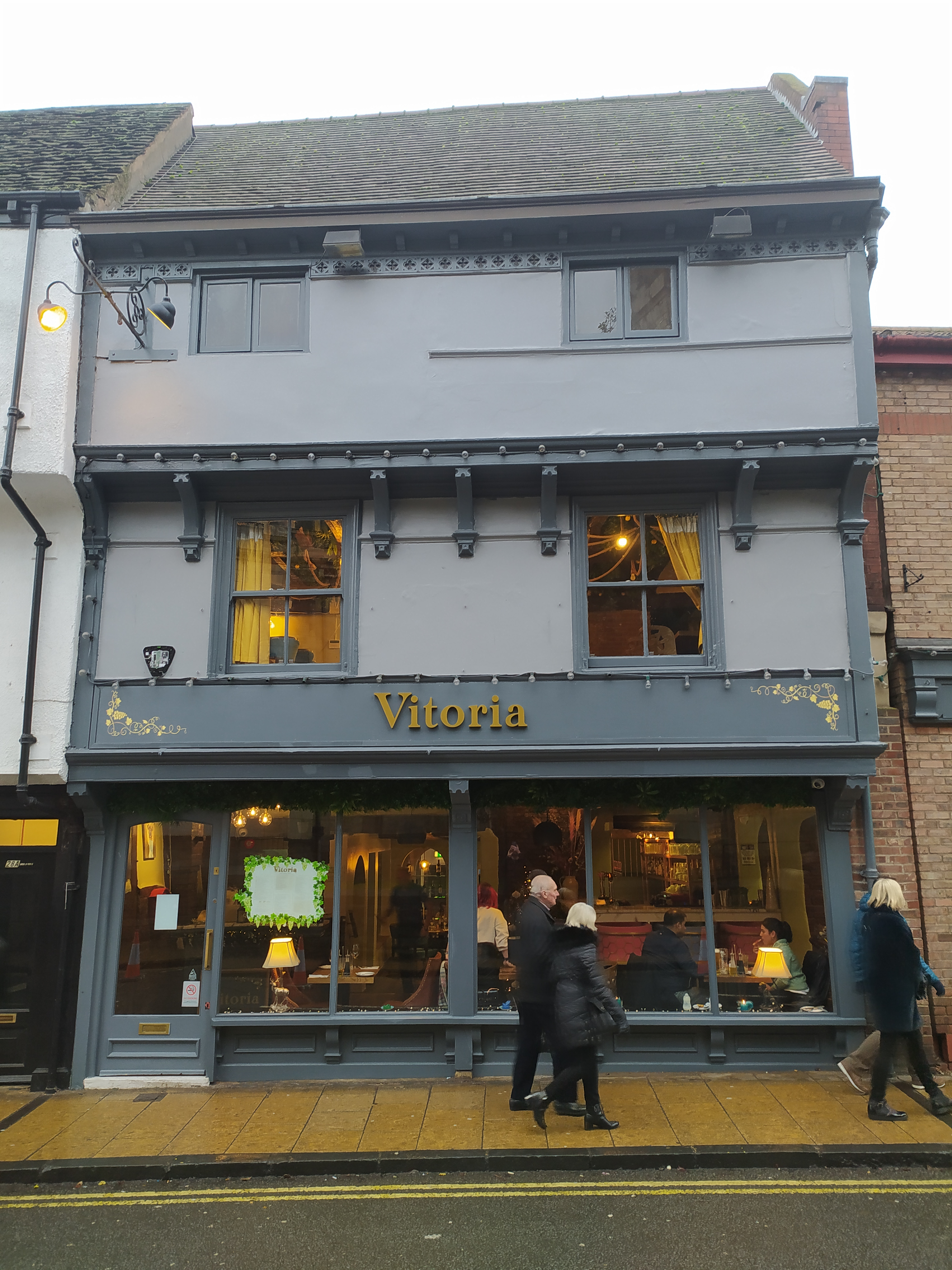
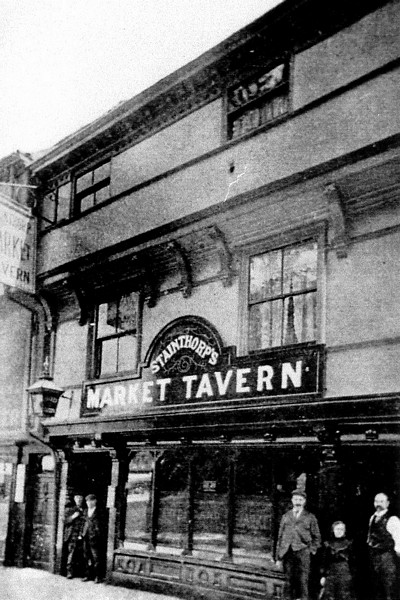
- The building in 2021 The building in 1910, while operating as the Market Tavern
- Interactive map of the 26 Coppergate area

General information
- Location: Coppergate, York, England
- Coordinates: 53°57′29″N 1°04′49″W
- Years built: Late 15th century (front); 17th century (rear)
- Renovated: 18th century (altered); 19th century (altered and extended); Late 20th century (renovated)

Technical details
- Material: Timber framed, brick
- Floor count: 3

Design and construction
- Designations

Listed Building – Grade II*
- Official name: 26, Coppergate
- Designated: 14 June 1954
- Reference no.: 1257900

26 Coppergate is a historic building in the city centre of York, England.

The front part of the building dates from the late 15th century, and is a timber-framed structure, three storeys tall and two bays wide. The rear part of the building is built of brick, and was added in the 17th century. The building was altered in the 18th century, and altered and extended in the 19th century. Around the middle of that century, it became the Market Tavern pub.

In 1954, the building was Grade II* listed. The pub closed in the second half of the 20th century, following which, the building was renovated. From 1986, it operated as the restaurant Russell's of Coppergate. In 2021, it became an Italian restaurant, Vitoria.

Both storeys at the front of the building are jettied. The rear part of the building is slightly longer than the front part, and it includes a cellar. In the cellar is the bottom part of a historic spiral staircase. Several early fireplaces also survive in the building.

== See also ==
- Grade II* listed buildings in the City of York
- Listed buildings in York (within the city walls, southern part)
