= The Watergate Inn =

Listed pub in York, England

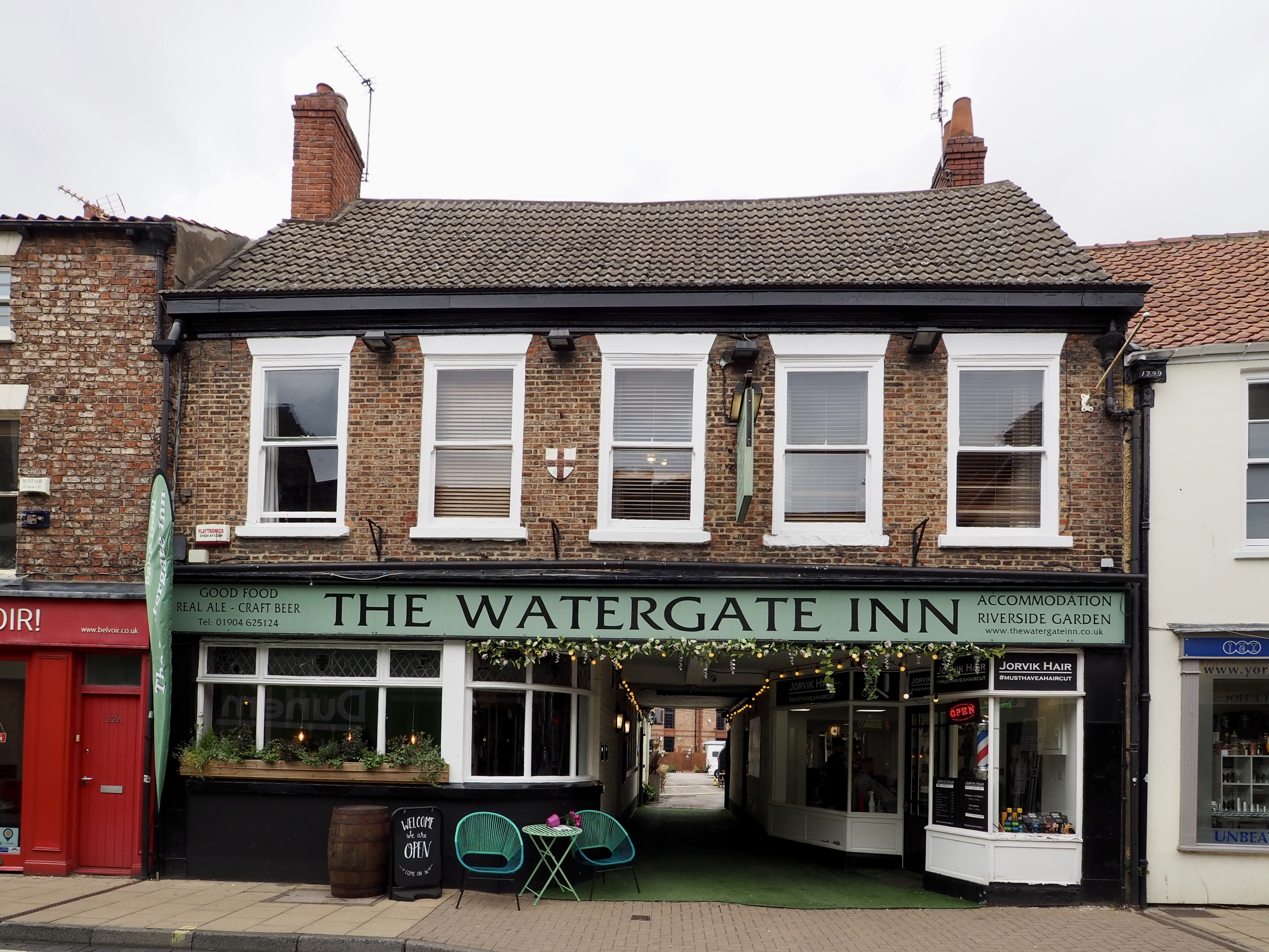
- The pub in 2021
- Former names: Five Lions

General information
- Type: Public house
- Location: 24 Walmgate, York, England
- Coordinates: 53.9573°N 1.0769°W
- Year built: Late 18th century
- Renovated: 19th century (stables raised); 20th century (altered and partly demolished) c. 1930 (refronted)

Website
- thewatergateinn.com

Listed Building – Grade II
- Official name: The Five Lions public house and attached outbuildings
- Designated: 14 June 1954
- Reference no.: 1256374

The Watergate Inn is a historic public house in the city centre of York, England.

The pub lies on Walmgate, a street which had 20 pubs in 1901, of which The Watergate is the last survivor. The first record of a pub on the site was of the City Arms, in 1702. It was rebuilt in the late 18th century, and by 1818 had become the Five Lions. The new building was a coaching inn, with stables behind, and as late as 1881 it had regular carriers running each Sunday to Wheldrake and Full Sutton.

By the start of the 20th century, the inn offered nine bedrooms. It began marketing some of them as specifically for cyclists. In addition to a bar and a smoke room, it had a dining room for women. It remained the Five Lions until 2015, when it was renamed "The Watergate Inn", in reference to the River Foss, flowing behind the pub. The pub has been Grade II listed since 1954.

The pub has two storeys and is built of brick. It was originally L-shaped in plan, but was later extended to have a rectangular plan. In the 19th century, a carriageway was built through the structure, to provide access to the stables. The part of the ground floor to the right of the carriageway is now a separate shop. The pub's tiled front was added in the 1930s. The interior has been repeatedly altered in the 20th century. The stables were originally a mixture of one and two-storey structures, but in the 19th century were all raised to two storeys. They were partly demolished in the 20th century, and were later converted into accommodation.

== See also ==
- Listed buildings in York (within the city walls, southern part)
