= 18–22 Pavement =

Listed former pub in York, England

- The building in 2024
- Interactive map of the 18–22 Pavement area
- Former names: Pavement Vaults

General information
- Status: Converted to commercial and office use
- Type: Public house (former)
- Location: Pavement, York, England
- Coordinates: 53.9587°N 1.0795°W
- Year built: 1893; 133 years ago
- Renovated: 20th century (shopfronts)
- Closed: 1963 (as a pub)

Design and construction
- Designations

Listed Building – Grade II
- Official name: 18, 20 and 22, Pavement
- Designated: 24 June 1983
- Reference no.: 1256916

18–22 Pavement is a Grade II listed former public house on Pavement in York, England. Built in 1893 and incorporating earlier fabric from a house of about 1700 within No. 18, it retains later 20th‑century shopfronts. The premises were formerly known as the Pavement Vaults, which closed in 1963, and the building is now used for commercial units and office accommodation.

== History ==
The building stands on Pavement and dates from 1893, with earlier fabric from a house of about 1700 incorporated into No. 18, and retains later 20th‑century shopfronts. The premises were formerly occupied by the Pavement Vaults, a public house that closed in 1963. In 1968 the site was included within the newly established Central Historic Core conservation area, and on 24 June 1983, Nos. 18–22 were designated a Grade II listed building. It stands between the Golden Fleece pub at No. 16 and No. 24, both also Grade II listed. At an unpublished date in the late 20th century, the former pub was converted for use as commercial units and office accommodation.

== Architecture ==
The front of the building is decorated with patterned plaster and applied timber framing. At the back, earlier brickwork survives, with one wing rendered and another built in mottled brick. The front range has a slate roof with a tiled crest, while the rear roofs are pantiled; there are brick chimneys and a terracotta finial on the gable.

The front has three storeys and three bays, with the left bay gabled and containing an attic. The shopfronts are modern but set within the original pilasters, frieze and cornice. At the left end, the doorway has a raised‑panel door set in panelled surrounds, with a carved frieze and a scrolled pediment above a segment‑headed overlight.

On the first floor, the centre and right bays have sash windows divided into two and four lights. The left bay, set back between posts topped with carved heads supporting sphinx figures, contains a five‑light bow window with an elliptical outline and a carved lintel. The second floor has windows of two and four lights with shaped sills; the left window stands on brackets and has a carved lintel.

A carved cornice runs across the first floor, forming a beam over the recessed left bay and rising into scrolled pediments above each window. The eaves cornice over the centre and right bays is decorated with foliage and cartouches, and the attic beam carries stylised floral carving with a date at its centre. The attic window has two lights set within decorative timber framing with curved braces. The gable has bargeboards and winged devil figures at the lower ends, with a broken dragon finial at the top. The plasterwork includes two painted versions of the York city arms.

At the rear, the original gabled wall rises through three storeys and an attic. A three‑storey gabled wing projects to the left, and a three‑storey two‑window extension stands to the right. The ground floor is hidden by later additions, and the upper floors have altered openings with later sash windows. A raised brick band marks the attic level of the original rear wall.

== See also ==
- Listed buildings in York (within the city walls, southern part)
