= 37 Tanner Row =

Building in York, England

Coordinates: 53°57′29″N 1°05′18″W

The building, in 2025

37 Tanner Row is a historic building in the city centre of York, in England.

The site, on the south side of Tanner Row, has had a succession of uses, with a Roman road running underneath part of it. The current building was constructed between 1854 and 1855 as the "George Hotel". The hotel was later renamed as the "North Eastern", then in 1899 it was purchased by the North Eastern Railway, who converted it into offices for staff relocated from the former Scawin's Hotel. It passed through the London and North Eastern Railway and then to British Rail. By the 1980s, it housed the District Control and the offices of the area manager. It was grade II listed in 1983. The building was later sold to Historic England for use as offices. In 2023, it was marketed for sale for £2.775 million, and in 2026 it was purchased by Splendid Hotels, which announced plans to reconvert it into a hotel.

The building is constructed of red brick with painted stone dressings and a slate roof. It is four storeys high with a basement, and the front is nine bays wide. At the top, there is a heavy timber modillion cornice continuing around to the left-hand front, and the roof has a double span. At the rear, there is a single-storey former service wing, and in front there are painted cast iron railings on a stone plinth. There are sash windows throughout, and the central main entrance is under a stone portico carried on rusticated Tuscan order columns with a balustrade above.

== See also ==
- Listed buildings in York (within the city walls, southern part)
