= Peaseholme House =

Listed building in York, England

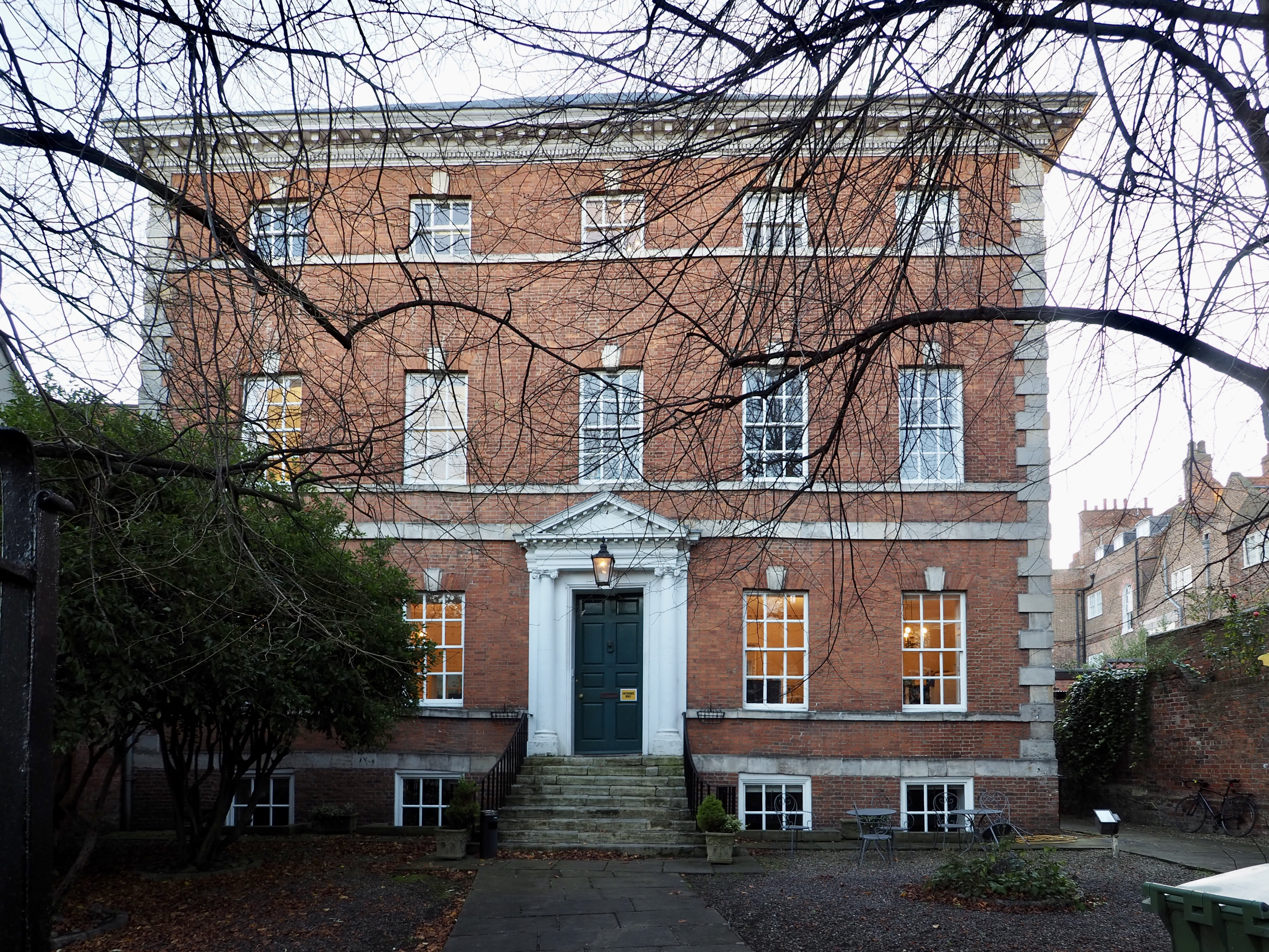
- Peaseholme House
- Interactive map of the Peaseholme House area
- Alternative names: Peasholme House

General information
- Location: St Saviour's Place, York, England
- Coordinates: 53°57′36″N 1°04′36″W
- Completed: c. 1752
- Renovated: 1975 (restored)

Technical details
- Floor count: 3 + cellar

Design and construction
- Architect: John Carr (probably)
- Designations

Listed Building – Grade II*
- Official name: Peaseholme House
- Designated: 14 June 1954
- Reference no.: 1256694

Peaseholme House or Peasholme House is a Georgian building on St Saviour's Place, near Peasholme Green in York, England.

It was built around 1752, probably by John Carr for a carpenter named Richard Heworth. It has been Grade II* listed since 1954 and was restored in 1975.

It has "strange rustication", with red brick in the front and orange brick at the back.

== See also ==
- Grade II* listed buildings in the City of York
