= Holy Trinity Church, Micklegate, York =

Grade I listed church in York, England

Holy Trinity Micklegate, York
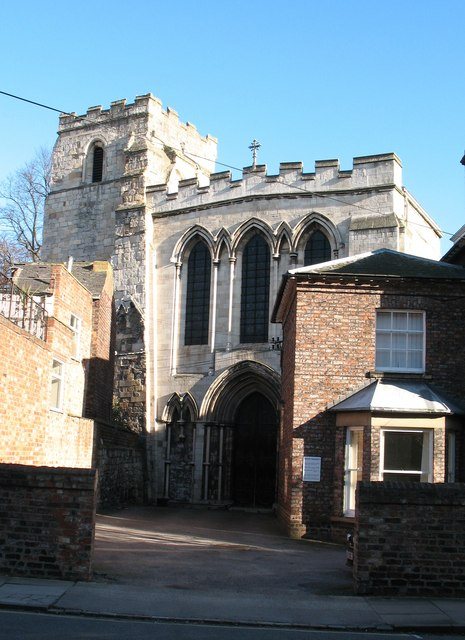
- Holy Trinity Church, Micklegate, York
- Holy Trinity Micklegate, York
- 53.956523°N 1.088963°W
- OS grid reference: SE 59889 51547
- Location: Micklegate, York
- Country: England
- Denomination: Church of England
- Previous denomination: Roman Catholic
- Website: holytrinitymicklegate.com

History
- Former name: Christ Church
- Dedication: Holy Trinity
- Dedicated: 1089
- Consecrated: 1089

Architecture
- Heritage designation: Grade I listed

Administration
- Province: Province of York
- Diocese: Diocese of York
- Archdeaconry: Archdeaconry of York
- Deanery: York Deanery
- Parish: Holy Trinity with St John, Micklegate and St Martin cum Gregory, York

Holy Trinity Church, Micklegate, York is a Grade I listed parish church in the Church of England in York.

== History ==
The church was a Benedictine monastery founded in 1089 as Micklegate Priory, York by Ralph Paynel, and dedicated to the Holy Trinity. It fronted on Micklegate, in the city of York, England. It was under the care of the Benedictine Abbey of Marmoutier. The site had previously been used for Christ Church, a house of secular canons. The church dates from the 12th century with additions in the 13th and 14th centuries. The tower dates from 1453. The monks were ejected during the Dissolution of the monasteries, and briefly reinstated during the 1536 Pilgrimage of Grace. The church was remodelled after the dissolution.

The south aisle was rebuilt during a restoration between 1850 and 1851 by J. B. and W. Atkinson of York. The body of the building was entirely re-pewed, and a new aisle, 10 feet (3.0 m) wide and 60 feet (18 m) was added on the south side, by opening the original arcades.

The chancel and vestry were rebuilt between 1886 and 1887 by Fisher and Hepper. The chancel was rebuilt and was 38 feet (12 m) long and 23 feet (7.0 m) wide. It included a new vestry and organ chamber.

The west front was reconstructed in 1902 to 1905 by Charles Hodgson Fowler.

In 1934 the church was united with St John's Church, Micklegate, York and in 1953 with St Martin-cum-Gregory, Micklegate.

== Church hall ==
Jacob's Well is the church hall located on Trinity Lane. It is a Grade I listed medieval building.

== Stained glass ==
The church contains stained glass of national significance. Charles Eamer Kempe, whose work features extensively, stands as one of the leading national figures in 19th and 20th-century decorative art. The church also contains windows by two of York's most significant exponents of the Gothic Revival, Barnett and Knowles. Although seemingly insignificant, the Pace/Harry Stammers window represents the collaboration between one of Britain's most influential modern architects and one of the UK's most important 20th-century stained glass designers.

- East Window (1907) by Kempe. The window is regarded as one of Kempe's last works before his death in April 1907. The window shows Christ on the cross, as well as saints including Helena and John, and various representations of the Trinity.
- North Chancel (1850) by John Joseph Barnett (1789–1859) of York. This is the earliest surviving stained glass in the church.
- North Nave (1877) by John Ward Knowles.
- St Nicholas Chapel (1905) by Kempe, depicting St Nicholas resurrecting three children who had been killed in a barrel of brine.
- St Nicholas Chapel (1953) by George Pace and Harry Stammers.
- West Window (1904) by Kempe, depicting saints Benedict, James, Martin and Thomas whose altars could be found in the former Benedictine priory church.

== Memorials ==
- Dr. John Burton (d. 1771) (the model for Doctor Slop in Laurence Sterne's novel The Life and Opinions of Tristram Shandy, Gentleman).
- For about two hundred years from 1700, many of the sisters from the Bar Convent were buried in the churchyard and chancel.

== Organ ==
The pipe organ dates from 1906 and is by Norman and Beard. A specification of the organ can be found on the National Pipe Organ Register.

== See also ==
- Grade I listed buildings in the City of York
- Listed buildings in York (within the city walls, southern part)
