= 92 Micklegate =

Listed building in York, England

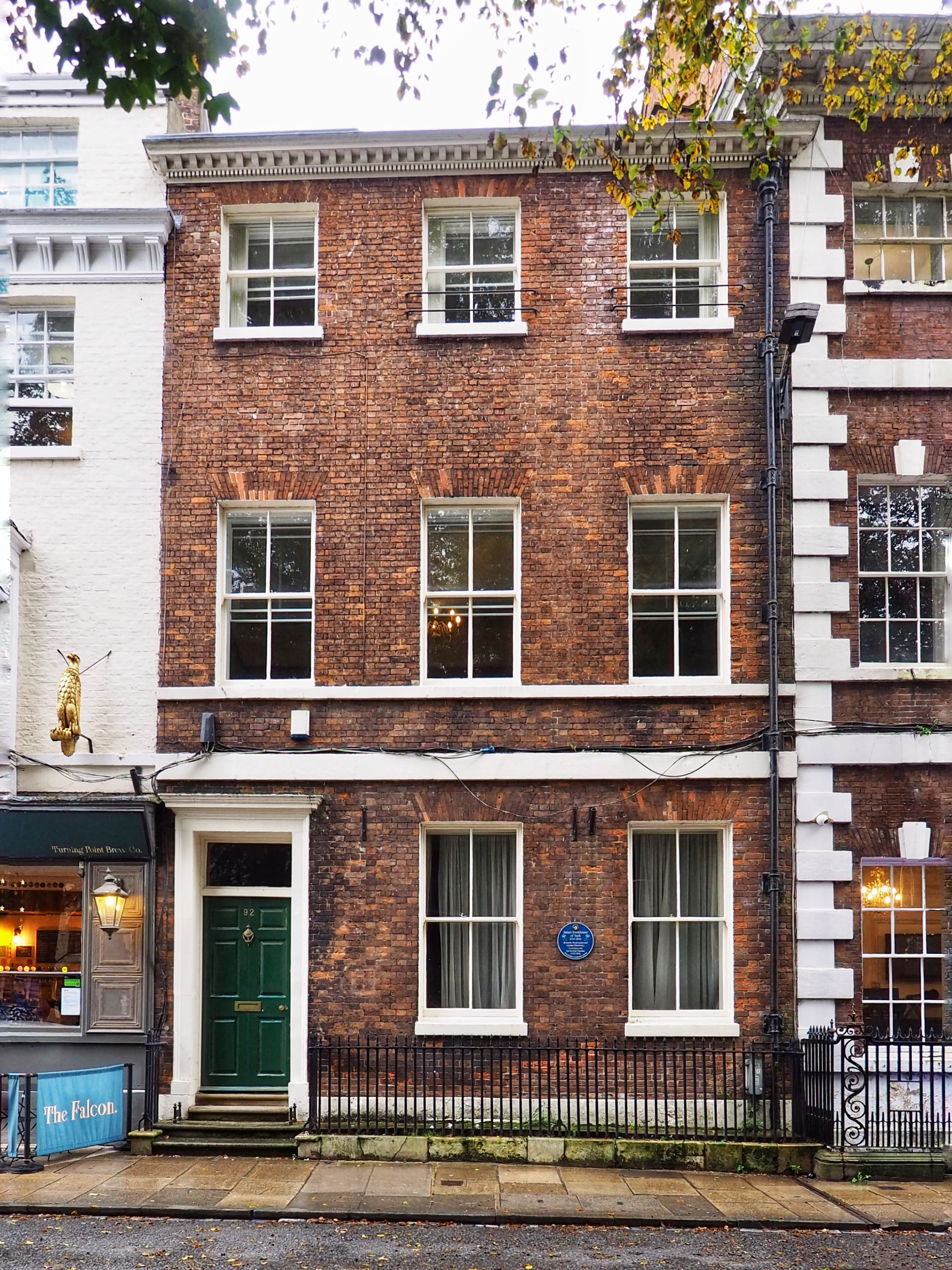
- The building in 2023
- Interactive map of the 92 Micklegate area

General information
- Type: House (formerly offices; originally a house)
- Location: Micklegate, York, England
- Coordinates: 53.9570°N 1.0894°W
- Year built: c. 1789; 237 years ago
- Renovated: 19th century (altered); 1989 (renovated) c. 2023 (converted)

Design and construction
- Architect: John Carr (probable)

Listed Building – Grade II*
- Official name: Number 92 and railings attached at front and rear
- Designated: 14 June 1954
- Reference no.: 1257288

92 Micklegate is a Grade II* listed building on Micklegate in the city of York, England. Built around 1789 as a house and probably designed by the firm of John Carr, it incorporates an earlier rear range later altered in the 19th century. The property was owned by members of the Fairfax and Backhouse families during the 18th and 19th centuries, and a blue plaque records the residence of James Backhouse and his brother Thomas. The building was included in the Central Historic Core conservation area in 1968. It stands between Micklegate House, listed at Grade I, and the Grade II‑listed Falcon pub. In the 20th and early 21st centuries it was used as offices, most recently by York Conservation Trust and the Council for British Archaeology, before plans were submitted to return it to residential use.

== History ==
Standing on Micklegate and built around 1789 as a house, it is thought to have been designed by the firm of John Carr. Its staircase details resemble those used by Peter Atkinson in other York houses. Behind the main range is a two‑storey block that may date from the early 18th century; it was updated in the 19th century, when an upper floor was added to the vestibule linking it to the house. Wrought‑iron scrollwork was fixed beside the entrance in 1948.

The site was first owned by Robert Fairfax, a Royal Navy captain who became York's MP in 1713 and lord mayor in 1715. In 1805 his grandson, John Fairfax of Newton Kyme, sold the house to Mary Coates of York, who had lived there since 1800.

Later owners included Thomas Backhouse, a seedsman, from 1817 until his death in 1845, and his brother James Backhouse (1794–1869), nurseryman and seedsman, who remained until moving to Holgate House in 1859. A blue plaque on the house records their residence, noting James's work as a botanist, nurseryman and Quaker missionary.

On 14 June 1954, No. 92 was designated a Grade II* listed building, and in 1968 the site was included within the newly established Central Historic Core conservation area. It stands between Grade I-listed Micklegate House at Nos. 88–90, and The Falcon, a Grade II-listed public house at No. 94.

The building has been used as offices by an insurance company, insolvency practitioners, and accountants. From 2012 until 2023 it served as the home of York Conservation Trust, which shared the premises with the Council for British Archaeology until both organisations moved to De Grey House. Plans were subsequently submitted to convert the building back into a residential dwelling.

== Architecture ==
The front is built of red brick on a stone base, with painted stone details and a timber door surround. A timber cornice runs beneath the hipped slate roof, which has a shortened brick chimney at the back. Low stone plinths with iron railings stand at both the front and rear.

The building has three storeys and three windows across the front. At the left side, stone steps with boot scrapers lead to a six‑panel door set in a simple surround with a moulded hood. All the windows are four‑pane sashes set under flat brick arches; those on the ground and second floors have painted stone sills, and the first floor is marked by a sill band and a raised band. At the right end of the cornice is a bell‑shaped rainwater head with a downpipe held by decorative clamps.

At the rear, the windows are four‑pane sashes in enlarged openings with shallow arched heads. A raised brick band marks the first floor, and the eaves have a brick dentil course.

=== Interior ===
On the ground floor, the entrance hall has a moulded dado rail and cornice, and a round arch on pilasters leads into the staircase hall. Another round arch at the foot of the stair opens to the rear left room. The cantilevered staircase rises from ground to second floor, with slender turned balusters and a moulded handrail that curves around a column newel on a shaped lower step. The front room has a dado rail, applied plaster wall decoration, and a dentil cornice with a coved, fluted frieze.

On the first floor, the landing has a moulded cornice. The front room contains panelling and shutters in the window reveals, a doorcase with fluted frieze, a moulded cornice, and rosette ornaments, and a fireplace with a fluted frieze and dentilled shelf. On the second floor, the landing has a dentilled moulded cornice, and original fireplaces survive in all three rooms.

At the front, the railings have square uprights with pointed tips; those at the rear have anthemion finials and standards topped with urns.

== See also ==
- Grade II* listed buildings in the City of York
- Listed buildings in York (within the city walls, southern part)
