= Gibsons, York =

Listed pub in York, England

Gibsons
- The pub in 2026
- Interactive map of the Gibsons area
- Former names: Bar Hotel; The Bar; Scruffy Murphy's; Micklegate Inn; Montey's Rock Café
- Alternative names: Gibson's

General information
- Type: Public house; originally a house
- Location: 129 Micklegate, York, England
- Coordinates: 53.9559°N 1.0906°W
- Year built: 1861; 165 years ago
- Renovated: 1865 (converted); 2002 and 2020s (refurbished)
- Owner: Heineken UK

Design and construction
- Designations

Listed Building – Grade II
- Official name: The Bar Hotel
- Designated: 24 June 1983
- Reference no.: 1257269

Website
- gibsonspubyork.co.uk

Gibsons (officially listed as the Bar Hotel) is a Grade II listed public house on Micklegate in York, England. The building originated as a house built in 1861 and was converted into a pub in 1865. It stands immediately next to the city walls and close to Micklegate Bar. The pub traded as Scruffy Murphy's from 1996 to 2002, then became the Micklegate Inn. It remained under that name until 2011, when it was renamed Montey's Rock Café. After closing as Gibsons in 2020, the premises reopened under the same name in 2025. It is operated by Star Pubs, and as of December 2025 the freehold is owned by Heineken UK.

== History ==
The building stands on Micklegate and originated as a house built in 1861, later converted into a public house in 1865. It is immediately next to the York city walls and close to Micklegate Bar.

The 1885 directory for York lists Mrs Elizabeth Wake at the Bar Hotel, with the address given as No. 53. The Ordnance Survey map published in 1892 shows the Bar Hotel public house. The 1913 Kelly's Directory of the North and East Ridings of Yorkshire records William Thorpe at No. 129, where the entry under "Public Houses" gives the name simply as "Bar".

The building as Montey's Rock Café in 2009

In 1968 the site was included within the newly established Central Historic Core conservation area, and on 24 June 1983, the Bar Hotel was designated a Grade II listed building. The pub traded as Scruffy Murphy's from 1996 until 2002, after which it became the Micklegate Inn. It was refurbished at the end of 2002 and operated under that name until 2005, when it became Montey's Rock Café. After closing as Gibson's in 2020, the premises reopened under the same name in 2025. It is operated by Star Pubs, and as of December 2025, the freehold is owned by Heineken UK.

== Architecture ==
The building is constructed in pink and cream mottled brick, with the front laid in Flemish bond and the ground floor painted. It has painted stone bands at plinth and sill level, a timber eaves cornice with modillions that returns at each end, and a slate roof with brick chimneys and a three‑light dormer. The plan is arranged around a central entrance.

The front has three storeys, with cellars and an attic, and three windows across. Small barred cellar openings sit in the plinth beside the entrance steps. The doorway has panelled double doors and a tall overlight set back within a pilastered surround topped by a segmental pediment. The windows are four‑pane sashes, and those beside the entrance sit within tall rectangular recesses. Ground‑floor windows have individual sills, while the upper floors have raised sill bands. All openings have flat brick heads.

At the rear, the windows are 12‑pane sashes. On the left side, a tall doorway with an elliptical arch has been altered to a modern window. On the right side, a first‑floor entrance reached by steps from the adjacent city walls has a modern glazed door and screen beneath the original flat arch. Above it is a round‑arched sash with radial glazing, and the attic has paired 12‑pane sashes with painted stone sills and flat brick heads.

== See also ==
- Listed buildings in York (within the city walls, southern part)
