= Jacobs Well, York =

Grade I listed building in York, England

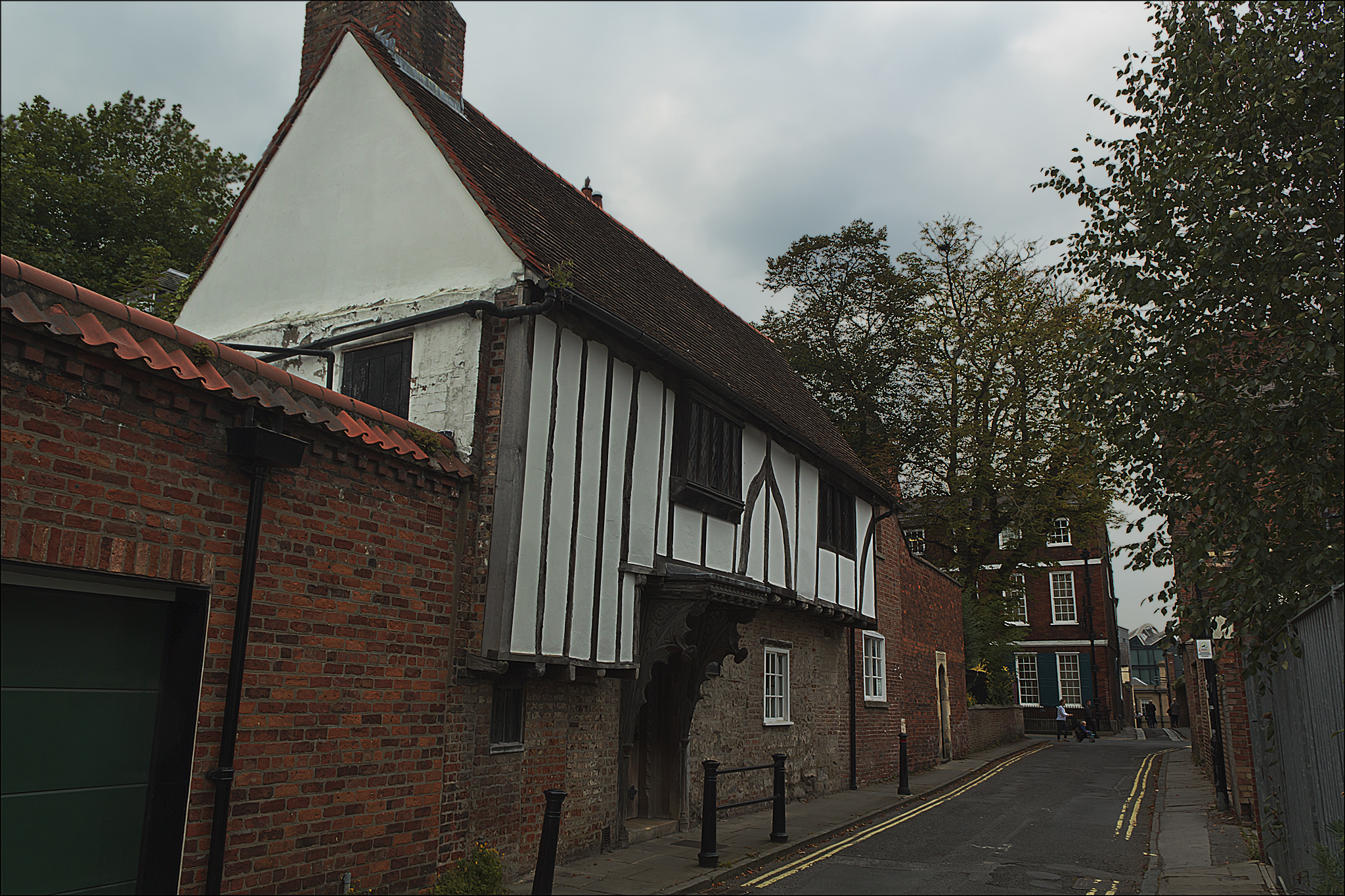
- Jacobs Well, Trinity Lane, York

- Location within York City Centre

General information
- Location: Trinity Lane, York, England
- Coordinates: 53.95681°N 1.08846°W
- Grid position: SE 59908 51574
- Year built: c. 1474

Design and construction
- Designations

Listed Building – Grade I
- Official name: Jacobs Well
- Designated: 14 June 1954
- Reference no.: 1256384

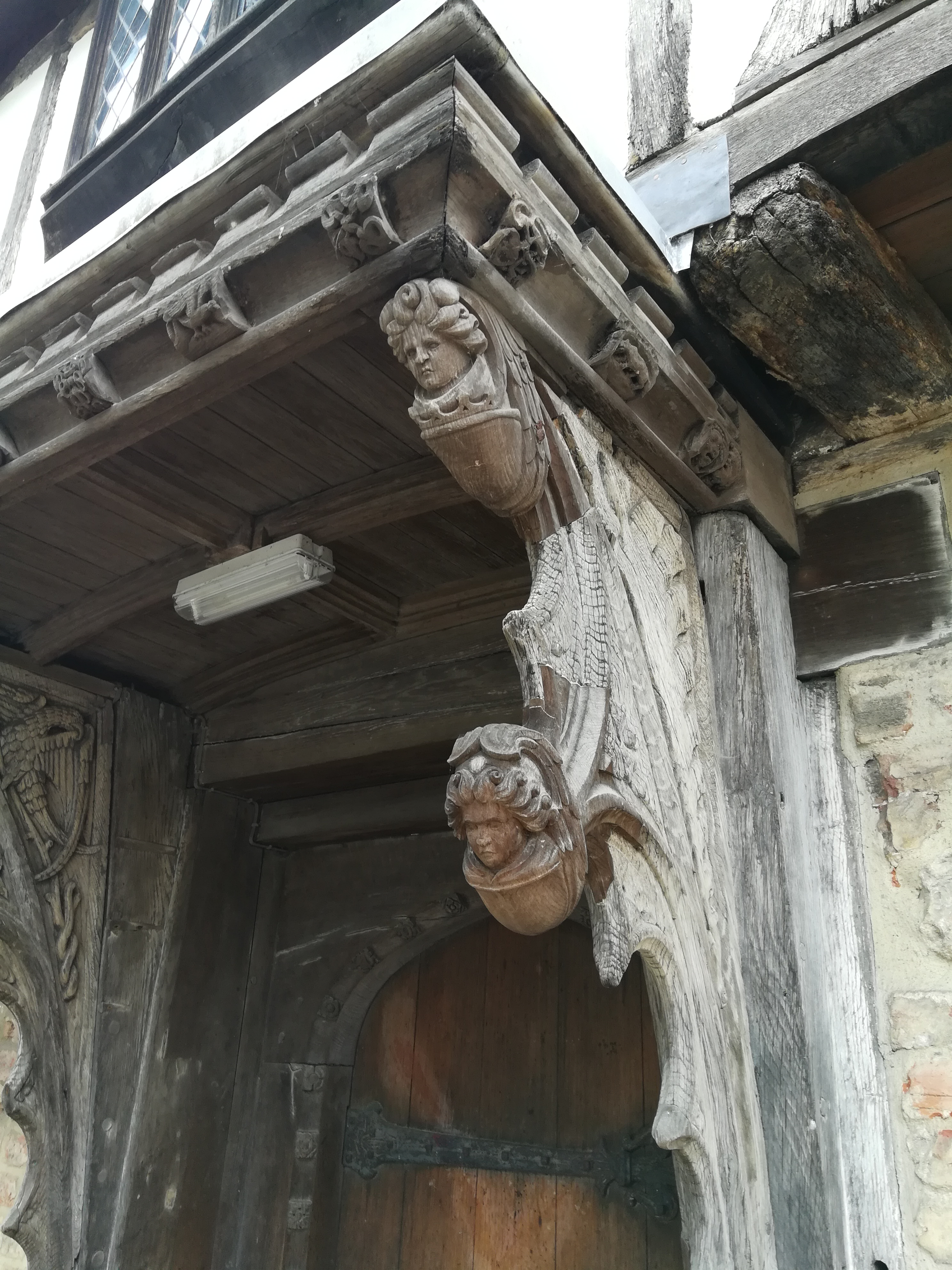
Close up of the door canopy

Jacobs Well is a Grade I listed medieval building in the Micklegate area of York, England. It is the church hall of Holy Trinity, Micklegate.

== History ==
The origin of the building is not known with certainty, but its current custodians claim that it was built in about 1474 as lodgings for a chantry priest based at neighbouring Holy Trinity Priory. The construction was funded by Thomas Nelson, a city alderman, who wished the priest to pray for his family. Following the Dissolution of the monasteries, the building was purchased by Isabella Ward, former prioress of Clementhorpe Nunnery. She lived in the house with her sister, which appears to have been divided in two during this period. Before Ward's death, she donated the property to the Feoffees of York. They permitted her to continue to live in the house for a peppercorn rent of one red rose a year.

During the early 17th century, the house was used as a rectory for Holy Trinity, Micklegate. A first floor was added to the hall, making the whole building two stories. Around this date, new windows and fireplaces were added, many of which survived. The building was again divided into two houses, then in the 1740s was converted into a pub, for the first time known as "Jacobs Well".

In about 1790, the building was converted back to a house, leased by Roger Glover and John Furnish, who ran a stagecoach business. They obtained fire insurance for the building, the sun mark for which survives. In 1815, they had a third storey, of brick, added to the wing, and an extension built to house a kitchen. This extension covered the original entrance, so a new entrance was created on Trinity Lane, which remains the main entrance to the building.

With the alterations complete, the building again became a pub, with two bars downstairs, and accommodation for the landlord above. However, it struggled to make money in its hidden location, and in 1903 the alcohol license was surrendered. The feoffees retained ownership of the building, and they decided that it should become a parish room for Holy Trinity Church.

In 1905, local antiquarian Walter Harvey Brook made major alterations to the building, adding a new staircase, bay window and fireplace, and creating a new door to the garden. A 15th-century canopy was added to the main entrance, taken from the Old Wheatsheaf Inn on Davygate.

By the 1980s, the building was in danger of collapse, in part due to vibrations caused by traffic passing along Trinity Lane. In order to save it, the brick top storey was removed, and a new roof was constructed for the wing to match that over the hall. This work was completed in 1991, and since then, use of the building has been under the care of Holy Trinity, Micklegate.

The building is the home of Gild of Butchers in York, having moved from their hall in The Shambles.

== Architecture ==
The building was originally a hall house, consisting of a hall rising the full two-story building, with a wing at the east end. It may have had a matching wing at the west end, but no evidence survives. The house is timber-framed, with the ground floor infilled with medieval brick. Its upper floor is jettied. Its main entrance has a 15th-century canopy. The roof is of crown post construction, the roof in the wing being a reconstruction.

The building is named after the Well of Sychar, or more commonly, Jacob's Well where Jesus is said to have spoken to a Samaritan woman.

== See also ==
- Grade I listed buildings in the City of York
- Listed buildings in York (within the city walls, southern part)
