= 85–89 Micklegate =

Listed building in York, England

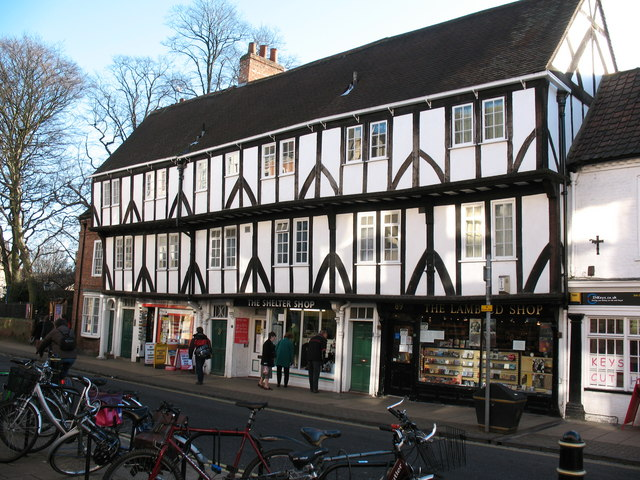
- Front of the building
- Interactive map of the 85–89 Micklegate area

General information
- Status: Mixed commercial and residential uses
- Type: Terrace of tenements (former)
- Location: Micklegate, York, England
- Coordinates: 53°57′24″N 1°05′22″W
- Completed: c. 1500; 526 years ago
- Renovated: c. 1600 (wing added to No. 89); 18th century (wing added to No. 87); Late 19th century (shopfronts); 1960s (restored)
- Owner: York Conservation Trust

Technical details
- Floor count: 3

Design and construction
- Designations

Listed Building – Grade II*
- Official name: 85, 87 and 89, Micklegate
- Designated: 14 June 1954
- Reference no.: 1257323

85–89 Micklegate is a Grade II* listed medieval building in the city centre of York, England.

The building was constructed in about 1500, in the grounds of Micklegate Priory and facing onto Micklegate, one of the main streets in York. The building does not appear on John Speed's generally accurate map of the city in 1610, which has led to an argument that it was constructed after this date; but stylistic features, such as the double-jettying on the front and the crown post roof, point to an earlier date, and Speed's omission may have been in order to show the buildings associated with the priory more clearly.

It is likely that the building was constructed to be rented out and provide more income for the priory. Its division into three properties is original, and originally each property had a single room on each of the three floors. Stairs appear to have originally been in annexes at the back of the buildings, but about 1600 a wing was added at the back of No. 89, while in the 18th century one was added to No. 87. Around 1660, the building was rendered to improve its weatherproofing. From at least the early 18th century, the properties were occupied by butchers. The current ground floor shop windows are Victorian.

The building was Grade II* listed in 1954, but by 1967 it was in poor condition. It was restored by the Ings Property Company, the process including the removal of the external rendering, and it is now owned by the York Conservation Trust. The ground floor is used by shops, with apartments above.

== See also ==
- Grade II* listed buildings in the City of York
- Listed buildings in York (within the city walls, southern part)
