= Bathurst House =

Listed building in York, England

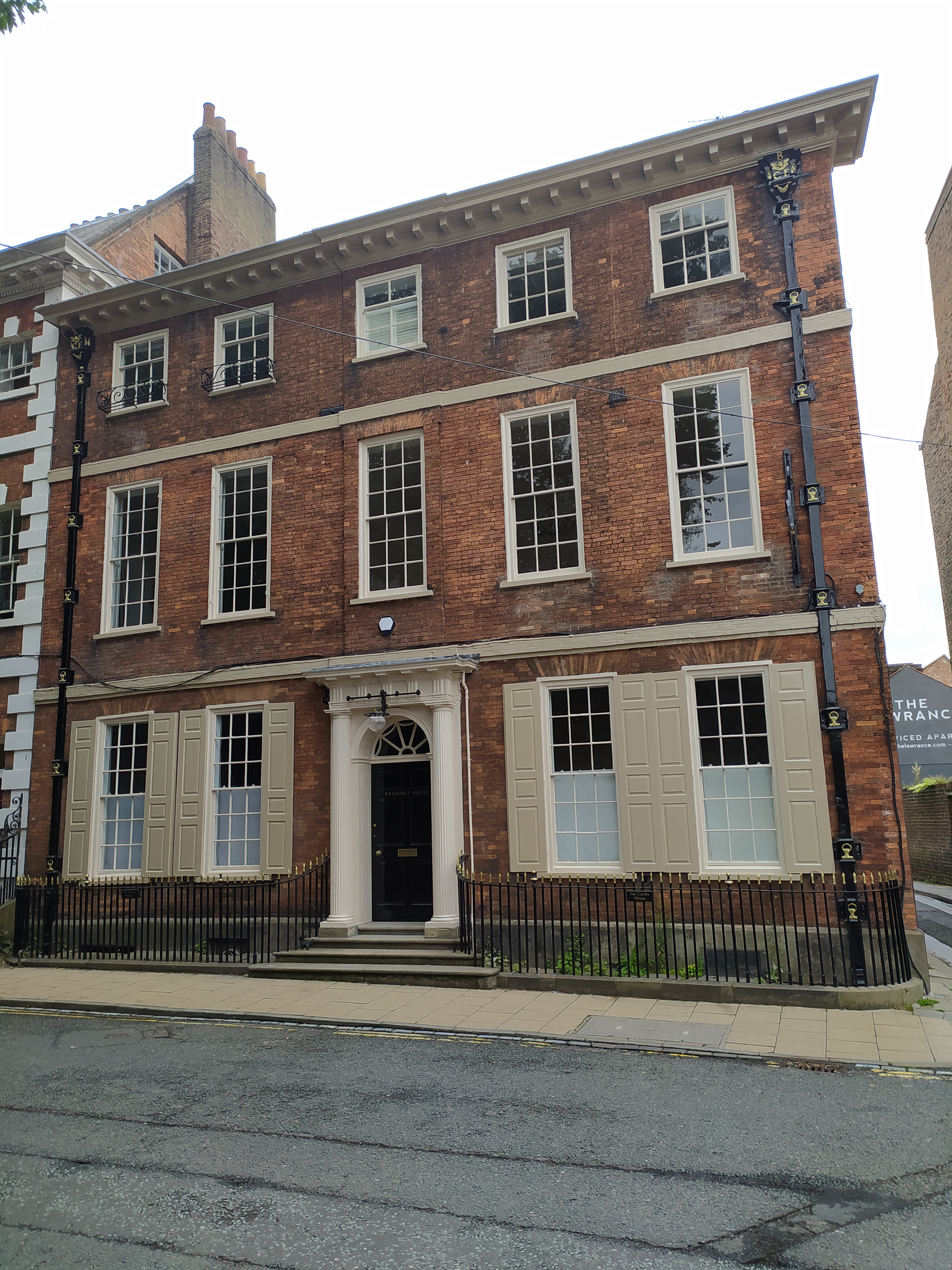
- The building in 2021
- Interactive map of the Bathurst House area

General information
- Location: 86 Micklegate, York, England
- Coordinates: 53°57′26″N 1°05′21″W
- Completed: c. 1727
- Renovated: c. 1822 (raised); Late 19th century (altered and extended at rear)
- Client: Charles and Frances Bathurst

Technical details
- Floor count: 3

Design and construction
- Designations

Listed Building – Grade II*
- Official name: Bathurst House and railings attached at front
- Designated: 14 June 1954
- Reference no.: 1257284

Bathurst House is a historic building in the city of York, England. Grade II* listed and standing at 86 Micklegate, part of the building dates to around 1727; it was raised to three storeys around 1822. The iron railings at the front of the property are part of the listing.

The property was built for Charles and Frances Bathurst. Upon Frances' death, she was buried in the church of St Martin-cum-Gregory across the street. Her tombstone stated she was "a person of excellent accomplishments both of body and mind, and adorned the several stations of life she went through".

From 1872 to 1879 it was used as offices for a District Goods Manager of the North Eastern Railway Company. Then it became the business premises of Grays, a musical instrument dealer.

It became a hotel between 1911 and 1921, then York YWCA. The University of York owned it in the 1960s, before it became the home of Barron and Barron, chartered accountants, having sold for £1 million in 2017.

== See also ==
- Grade II* listed buildings in the City of York
- Listed buildings in York (within the city walls, southern part)
