= The Priory, York =

Listed pub in York, England

The Priory
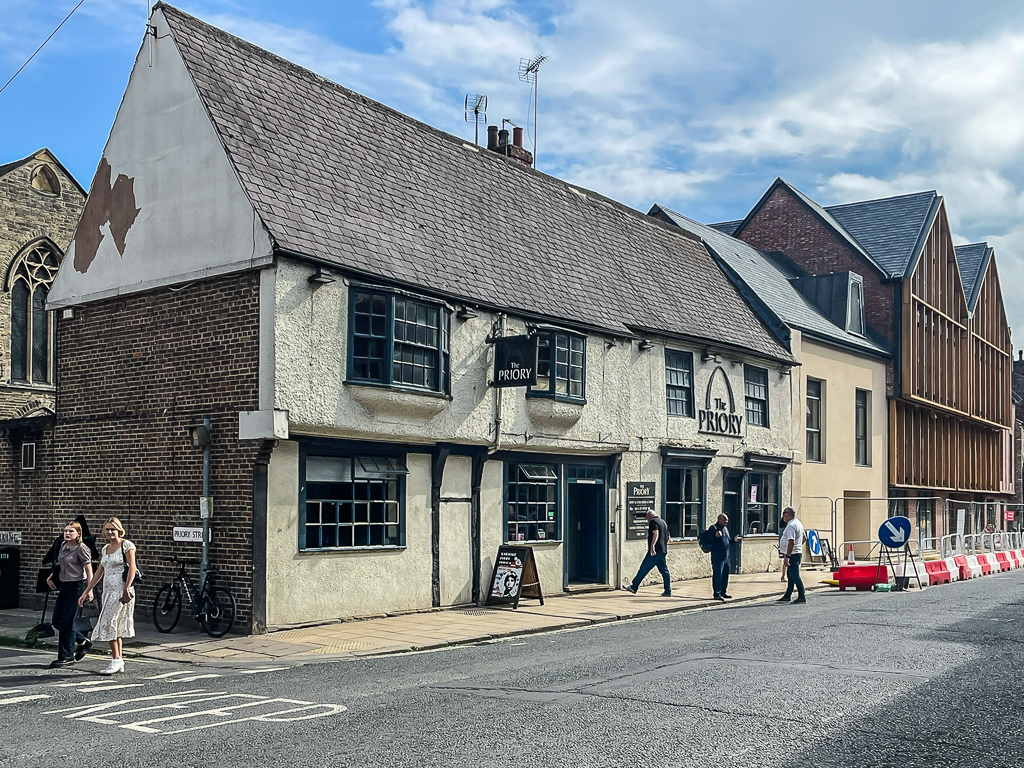
- The pub in 2025
- Former names: Coach and Horses; The Coach; Phalanx and Firkin

General information
- Type: Public house
- Location: 99–103 Micklegate, York, England
- Coordinates: 53.95643°N 1.09004°W
- Year built: Mid-14th century
- Renovated: 17th century (No. 103 rear wing); 19th century (No. 101 rear wing); Mid-18th and 20th century (refronted); Early 19th and 20th century (altered)

Website
- prioryyork.com

Listed Building – Grade II
- Official name: The Priory
- Designated: 1 July 1968
- Reference no.: 1257294

The Priory is a pub on Micklegate, in the city centre of York, England.

The building originated as four tenements in a row of seven, constructed in the mid-14th century, probably before 1369. From this period survives the jettying at the front, crown post roof trusses, and wattle and daub walls at attic level. The section now forming the pub had attics added in the 17th century, at which time a rear wing was added to what became 103 Micklegate. That tenement was refaced in brick in the following century.

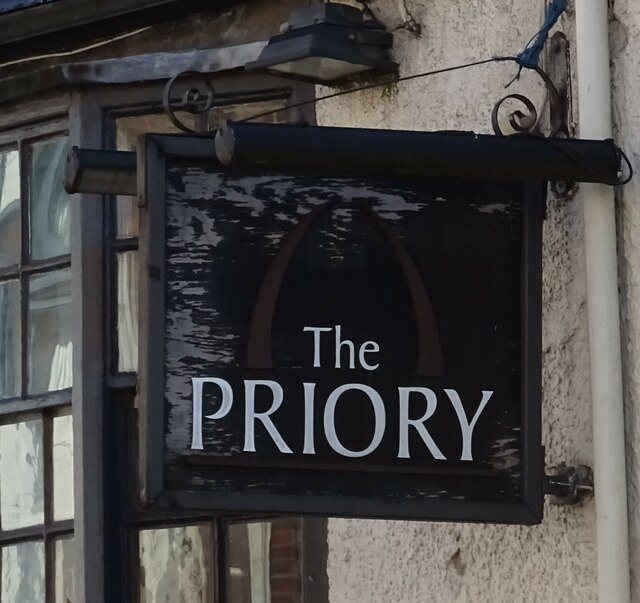
The sign above the entrance

In the 19th century, shop fronts were inserted at ground-floor level, which largely survive, and Nos. 99 and 101 were combined into a single shop. No. 103 was created from two of the original tenements, and by 1818 it was the Coach and Horses pub. In the early 20th century, the freehold of the pub became owned by Richard Pickard's Charity, and they sold it in 1945 to Joshua Tetley's & Son brewery. The following year, they also purchased Nos. 99 and 101 Micklegate, and expanded the pub into them.

The rear wall of Nos. 99 and 101 was rebuilt in brick in 1958. The remainder of the tenements were demolished in 1961. In 1968, the building was Grade II listed. The pub was later renamed as The Coach, then the Phalanx and Firkin, and in 2003 as The Priory, after Micklegate Priory, the gateway to which neighboured the building.

== See also ==
- Listed buildings in York (within the city walls, southern part)
