= Nova Scotia, Bristol =

Pub in Bristol, England

Nova Scotia Hotel
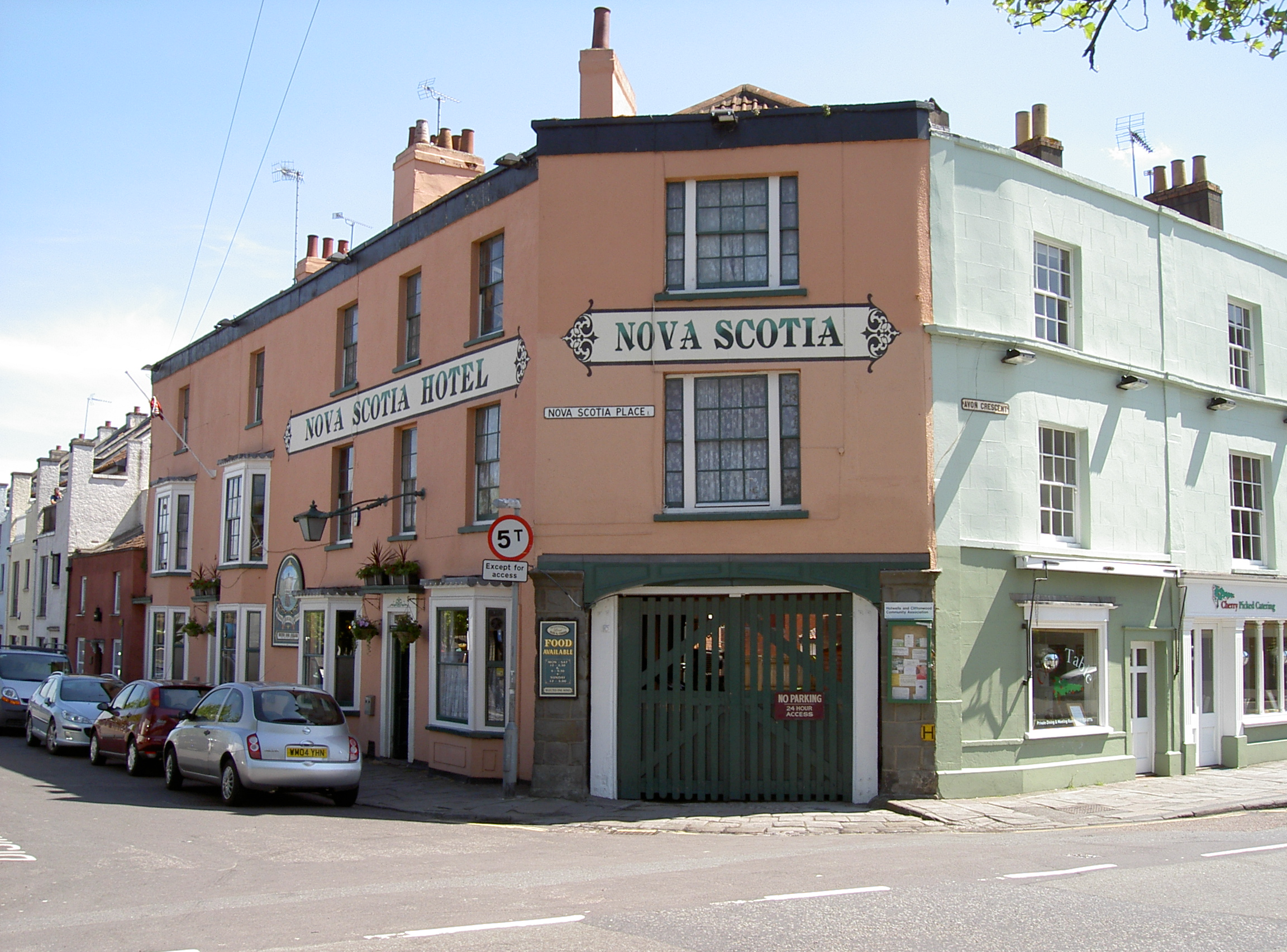

- Location within Bristol

General information
- Location: Bristol, England
- Coordinates: 51.446821°N 2.618483°W
- Completed: 1811
- Owner: Star Pubs & Bars

Design and construction
- Designations

Listed Building – Grade II
- Official name: Nova Scotia Hotel Public House
- Designated: 18 February 1972
- Reference no.: 1202387

Website
- https://novascotiabristol.com/

The Nova Scotia (grid reference ST571721) is a Grade II listed public house in Bristol, England. It is situated on Nova Scotia Place in Spike Island, adjacent to Cumberland Basin. Completed in 1811 as a row of three terraced houses that was later converted into its current use, it preserves an unusually intact late-Victorian interior that the Campaign for Real Ale (CAMRA) describes as being "of very special national historic interest".

== History ==
The terrace was erected for waterside workers during the first major expansion of the Cumberland Basin in 1811. By the mid-Victorian period the three dwellings had been amalgamated and licensed as the Nova Scotia Hotel, its name echoing the quay whose name commemorates the 1713 Peace of Utrecht, by which Bishop of Bristol John Robinson secured the cession of Nova Scotia to Britain. By 1889 the proprietors had merged two of the original houses, one formerly trading as the Docks Hotel, into a single establishment. Surviving traces of large lanterns and a carriageway arch show that it operated as a coaching inn, serving travellers and dock labourers alike.

== Architecture and interior ==
The Nova Scotia presents a modest three-storey Georgian façade of render-covered rubble stone beneath a slate roof, typical of early nineteenth-century terraces. A mid-19th-century cast-iron lampholder projects some five feet from the first floor over the pavement. The principal bar room is dominated by a two-section mahogany mirrored back bar, complete with slender, rounded-edge mirrored panels and bearing the maker's label of Bristol ship-fitters Parnall's, believed to have originally been created for an unrealised vessel. Its matching curved bar counter survives with ornate iron brackets, while a smaller, differently styled counter in the former private bar hints at a later installation.

The snug, also known as the Captain's Cabin, is enclosed by a low timber and etched-glass screen suspended from an iron stay. Beyond a low arched carriageway lies a courtyard once surrounded by stabling for coach horses. The original hay-loft opening, with its pulley, and small upstairs room for stable hands both survive in the buildings to the right of the yard. Throughout the ground floor, original bench seating is fixed to panelled dados. The maritime theme continues in the choice of old sea-chart reproductions used as wallpaper, gas-light wall brackets, and original wooden window shutters. Together, these features comprise one of the finest-surviving pub interiors of the period, earning the Nova Scotia a two-star entry on CAMRA's National Inventory of Historic Pub Interiors for its national architectural and historic importance.

== Modern usage ==
In the twenty-first century the Nova Scotia continues to trade as a traditional dockside pub. Since 2024 it has been operated under lease from Star Pubs & Bars (Heineken) by Bristol publican Sam Gregory, whose group also includes the Bank Tavern and The Bell.

The single ground-floor bar offers cask ales such as Courage Best, London Pride, along with Thatchers ciders and a back-bar of gins and rums. Weekly events include a folk music club in the upstairs function room and a live Irish session in the main bar.

The menu offers doorstep sandwiches and mixed grill. During a kitchen refurbishment in 2025 food was temporarily restricted to filled rolls, pork pies and Scotch eggs. Patrons can also make use of quay-side tables that provide views toward the Clifton Suspension Bridge, while on match days at nearby Ashton Gate Stadium the pub becomes a popular spot for Bristol City F.C. supporters.
