= 23 and 25 Micklegate =

Listed former pub in York, England

- The building in 2024
- Interactive map of the 23 and 25 Micklegate area
- Former names: The Grapes; Crown Hotel

General information
- Status: Converted to mixed commercial and community use
- Type: Public house (former); originally a hotel and house
- Location: Micklegate, York, England
- Coordinates: 53.9571°N 1.0862°W
- Year built: Early 19th century
- Renovated: c. 1855 (remodelled); Late 19th century (shopfronts)

Design and construction
- Designations

Listed Building – Grade II
- Official name: 23 and 25, Micklegate
- Designated: 17 August 1971
- Reference no.: 1257361

23 and 25 Micklegate is a Grade II listed former public house on Micklegate in York, England. The site has medieval origins and an inn stood here by the early 18th century, later known as The Grapes and then the Crown Hotel. The present building developed in the early 19th century as a house and hotel, incorporating earlier fabric, and was altered later in the century with new shopfronts. It is now occupied by solicitors' offices, charitable organisations and a psychotherapy practice.

== History ==
The plots now occupied by Nos. 23 and 25 were held in 1282 by Roger Basy, who paid rent to the master of Robert of Knaresborough. During the 14th and 15th centuries the property passed to the Knottyngley and Wenteworth families. An inn stood on the site by 1733, and one of its later owners was Thomas Varley (1693–1771), who served as sheriff of York in 1766–67.

By the early 19th century the inn was known as The Grapes, and the building developed as a house and hotel on Micklegate, incorporating earlier fabric in No. 25 and two 17th‑century rear wings behind No. 23. Shortly before 1830 the western part, now No. 25, was separated from the rest when Richard Dent, a miller, mortgaged it and sold it to Charles Robinson, a druggist who owned the neighbouring premises, in 1832. The property later traded as the Crown Hotel. It was altered around the mid‑1850s, and the present shopfronts were added later in the 19th century.

The 1851 directory of Kingston-upon-Hull and York records A. Shaw at the Crown Hotel, with the address given as No. 10, while the 1885 directory for York lists Thomas Barnes at the same address. The 1913 Kelly's Directory of the North and East Ridings of Yorkshire records Mrs Fanny Beatrice Picken at the Crown public house at No. 23, with the bicycle dealers Bell Arthur & Son at No. 25.

In 1968 the site was included within the newly established Central Historic Core conservation area, and on 17 August 1971, Nos. 23–25 were designated a Grade II listed building. It stands next to Nos. 19–21, of late-15th-century origin and also Grade II listed. No. 23 is now occupied as solicitors' offices, while No. 25 is used by a mix of charitable organisations and a psychotherapy practice.

== Architecture ==
The front of the building is finished in stucco, with a timber band and a decorative cornice at the eaves. The rear wings are 17th‑century in origin, built with timber framing and brick panels. The roofs are covered with pantiles, with the roofline of No. 25 set lower than that of No. 23, and both have brick chimneys.

No. 23 has a three‑storey front with two windows, while No. 25 has three storeys and a single window. A shared shopfront runs across the ground floor, made up of panelled uprights, shaped impost blocks and a dentilled cornice supported on carved brackets. The shop door sits in the centre of No. 23, flanked by later plate‑glass windows. At each end of the frontage, a six‑panel door with a blocked overlight stands beside the shopfront.

On the first floor of No. 23, the right‑hand window is a shallow bow with a central 12‑pane sash between two eight‑pane sashes, all set within a fluted frame with corner blocks; to the left is a 12‑pane sash in a raised surround. The second‑floor windows follow the same pattern. No. 25 has a shallow canted bay on the first floor with a 12‑pane centre sash and reeded mullions under a modillion cornice; above it is an unequal nine‑pane sash with a narrow sill.

The upper right section of No. 23 is shaped into a shallow round‑headed panel with moulded spandrels, forming a central feature that visually links the two fronts.

At the rear, paired gabled wings project to the right, each with 16‑pane sashes on the first floor and unequal nine‑pane sashes above, set over a raised brick band. To the left is an extension with a hipped roof, fitted with 16‑pane sashes, and a small wing with a pent roof.

=== Interior ===
Inside No. 23, the ground floor has a staircase running up to the second floor with slender uprights, a shaped handrail and turned posts at the corners. No. 25 has a taller staircase rising through the full height of the building, with heavier balusters and a moulded handrail. In the front part of No. 23 a large main beam is exposed, and two cross‑beams are visible in the rear wings.

On the first floor, the front room of No. 23 has a decorative cornice, partly cut across by a later partition, and a folding doorway with a fluted frame and corner blocks, now mostly hidden by the dividing wall with No. 25. At the back of No. 25, the structure of the wall shows a braced post and wall plates.

On the second floor, two 18th‑century firegrates survive: one in the left‑hand rear wing of No. 23, and another in the front room of No. 25, which has a painted timber surround. The front room of No. 23 contains a plain fireplace with a basket grate. The paired rear wings retain their timber studs and plates, along with posts shaped at the head and base. The roofs above are lined underneath.

== See also ==
- Listed buildings in York (within the city walls, southern part)
