= James Backhouse =

English botanist and missionary (1794–1869)

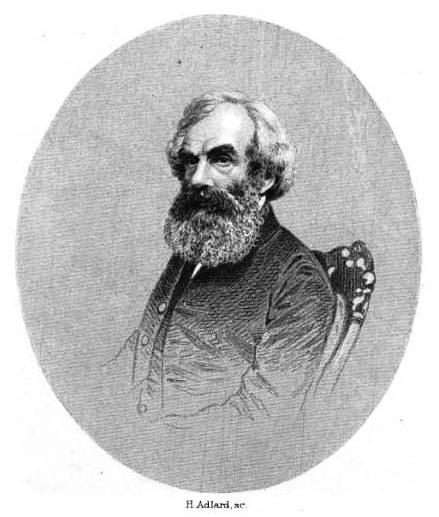
James Backhouse

See also for two other James Backhouse botanists and nursery owners of York.

James Backhouse (8 July 1794 – 20 January 1869) was a botanist and a missionary for the Quaker church in Australia. His son, also named James Backhouse (1825–1890), was likewise a botanist.

== Australia ==
As part of his legacy, the Australia Yearly Meeting of the Religious Society of Friends (Quakers) established a lecture series in 1964, as noted in the introduction to the third lecture, delivered by Rudi Lemberg in 1966.

== England ==
Backhouse was honoured by having the plant genus Backhousia named after him, whose species are all native to Australia.

In 2017 a blue plaque was unveiled at 92 Micklegate in York, once the home of the Backhouse brothers and, from 2012 until 2023, the offices of York Conservation Trust and the Council for British Archaeology. The plaque was the result of a collaboration between York Civic Trust, York Conservation Trust, and Yorkshire Gardens Trust. From 1859, Backhouse lived at Holgate House.

== Family ==
Backhouse was the third of five consecutive generations named James, so they are also often mentioned with generational suffix ordinals:

1. His grandfather James Backhouse (1) (1720–1798), who was the founder of Backhouse's Bank;
2. His father James Backhouse (2) (1757–1804);
3. James Backhouse (3) (1794–1869) himself;
4. His son James Backhouse (4) (1825–1890), who was a notable botanist; and
5. His grandson James Backhouse (5) (1861–1945), who was the author of A handbook of European birds (1890) and other publications.

After his return from Australia in 1841, James (3) made trips to Norway, to do his missionary work, but also to collect plants, together with his son James (4).
