= Adelphi Hotel, York =

Listed building in York, England

Adelphi Hotel
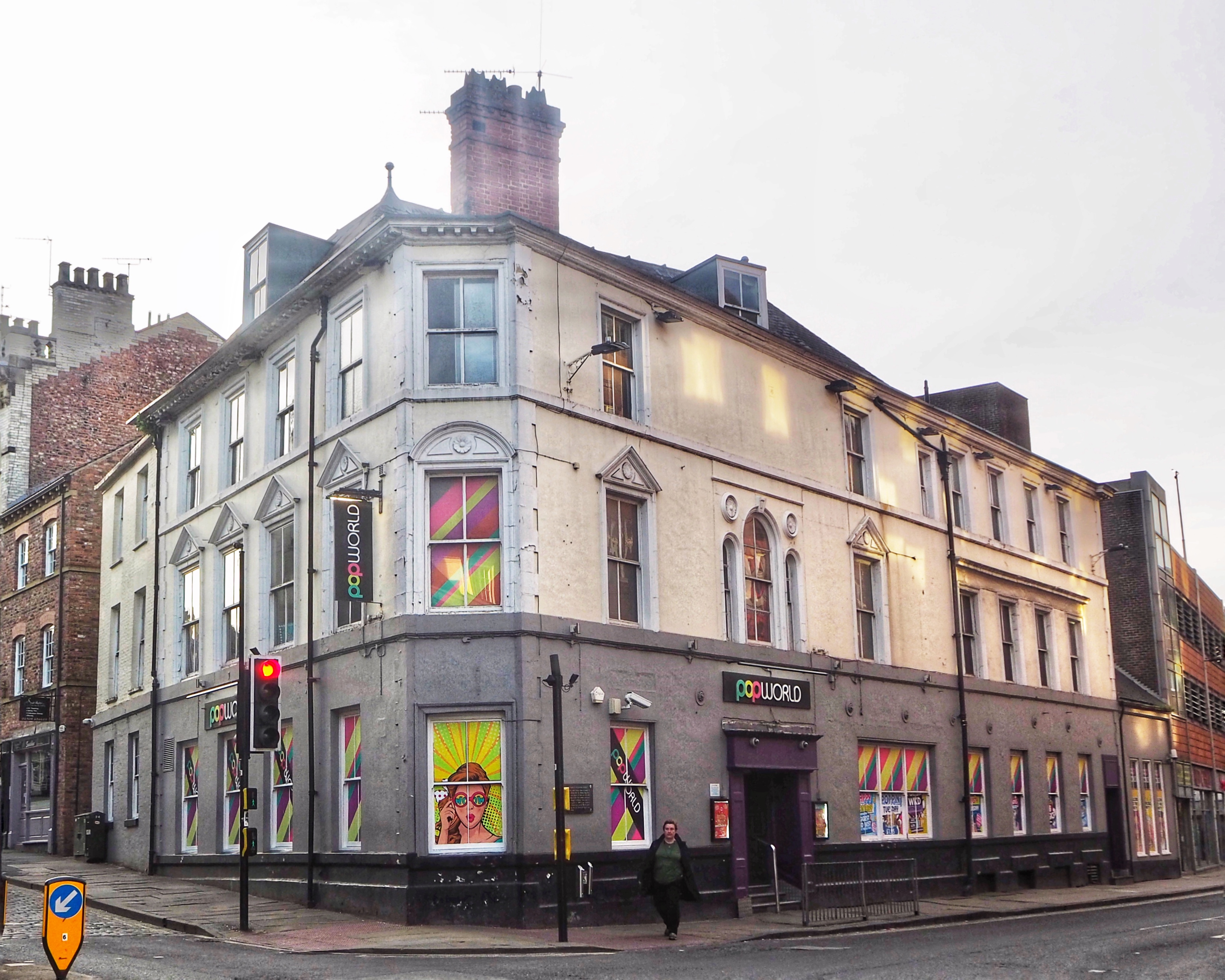
- The building in 2023
- Interactive map of the Adelphi Hotel area
- Former names: The Micklegate; Railway King; Edward's; Reflex
- Alternative names: Popworld York

General information
- Status: Converted into a nightclub
- Type: Hotel (former; includes former public houses)
- Location: 3 George Hudson Street, York, England
- Coordinates: 53.9575°N 1.0868°W
- Year built: Mid-19th century
- Renovated: 20th century (altered)

Design and construction
- Designations

Listed Building – Grade II
- Official name: The Adelphi Hotel the Railway King
- Designated: 19 August 1971 and 21 March 1996
- Reference no.: 1257767

Website
- Official website

The Adelphi Hotel is a Grade II listed building on the corner of George Hudson Street and Micklegate in York, England. Originally developed from early 19th‑century rebuilding on an older Micklegate plot, it later formed a substantial hotel complex occupying Nos. 26–28 Micklegate and Nos. 1–3 George Hudson Street. Parts of the building subsequently traded as The Micklegate and The Railway King public houses, and it has operated as the nightclub Popworld York since 2013.

== History ==
The building stands on what is now George Hudson Street at the corner with Micklegate and incorporates Nos. 26–28, which form a single corner block; No. 28 has earlier origins but was rebuilt around 1810, and the frontage was remodelled in the mid‑19th century when it became the Adelphi Hotel. The street was originally known as Hudson Street, later renamed Railway Street following George Hudson's financial downfall, and today bears his full name.

The site formed part of a larger block owned by the Benson family, extending north towards Tanner Row. The main range developed from a house with successive occupants through the late 18th and early 19th centuries, and was sold in 1819 to Thomas Cattley. No. 28, acquired earlier from George Benson, passed through several owners before the whole property came into the hands of the Rev. Robert Benson by 1810. He sold it to John Nicholson and the Gray brothers, who rebuilt the street front in 1810–11. Nicholson became sole owner shortly afterwards and in 1815 sold the newly rebuilt house to Henry Henwood.

The Adelphi Hotel later comprised the Micklegate frontage at No. 28 and the longer range along Railway Street, both of which were heavily altered in the 20th century. Behind No. 28 stood an earlier structure, No. 32, a mid‑16th‑century building known historically as the 'Back Part', altered in the 17th century and modernised around 1820 to 1830, now disused and probably no longer standing.

The 1851 directory of Kingston-upon-Hull and York records Henry Gray at the Adelphi Temperance Hotel at 1 Hudson Street and Robert Sollitt at 28 Micklegate. The 1885 directory for York lists Lewin Beaumont at the Adelphi Hotel at 1–2 Railway Street. On the 1891 Ordnance Survey map the Adelphi Hotel appears as the corner building at 26–28 Micklegate, and the adjoining frontage at 1–3 George Hudson Street is shown as one uninterrupted structure.

Railway King pub sign in 1994

In 1902 the Adelphi contained twenty‑three bedrooms along with a coffee room, commercial room, billiard room, smoke room, bar, vault, private room and a kitchen. The 1913 Kelly's Directory of the North and East Ridings of Yorkshire records the Adelphi Commercial Hotel at 1–3 Railway Street.

In 1968 the site was included within the newly established Central Historic Core conservation area, and on 19 August 1971 the Adelphi Hotel was designated a Grade II listed building. The adjoining portion identified as Nos. 1–3 George Hudson Street, which later traded as the Railway King public house, did not gain listed status until 21 March 1996. Before the 1971 renaming, the Micklegate‑fronting part of the building at No. 28 had operated as The Micklegate pub, although the precise dates of that name's use are not documented.

The name changed to the Railway King in 1971, a reference to George Hudson, whose role in York's railway expansion was being marked on the centenary of his death. It later traded as Edward's and then Reflex, before becoming the nightclub Popworld in 2013.

== Architecture ==
The George Hudson Street range is finished in stucco above a painted stone base, with shallow corner strips and a timber eaves band carried on small brackets. It has a hipped roof of slate with ball finials and brick chimney stacks.

28 Micklegate frontage in 2024

The part facing Micklegate, No. 28, is of painted brick, with stretcher bond on the ground floor and Flemish bond above, and a pantile roof with a bracketed eaves band.

The George Hudson Street front has three storeys and seven windows. The main entrance is set slightly to the left, with recessed panelled double doors under a later canopy; at the right end is another recessed modern glazed door reached by steps. All the windows are four‑pane sashes, with a triple window to the right of the main entrance. Above the entrance, the first‑floor window has three round‑headed lights set within a shallow panel with large decorative roundels; the other first‑floor windows sit in simple surrounds, and those flanking the triple window have small pediments with roundels in the centre. Four windows to the right are grouped under a projecting cornice. The second‑floor windows are in plain surrounds, and each floor has a continuous sill band.

The return front on Micklegate repeats the same treatment, including a canted corner bay at the right, where the first‑floor window has a curved pediment. No. 28 has a three‑storey front with two windows, all sashes with painted sills: 12 panes on the ground and first floors, and nine panes on the second. A raised band at first‑floor level continues the sill band from the adjoining range.

== See also ==
- Listed buildings in York (within the city walls, southern part)
