= 150 Micklegate =

Listed building in York, England

- The building in 2023
- Former names: 54 Micklegate; Your Bike Shed
- Alternative names: Micklegate Social

General information
- Status: Converted to bar and café
- Type: Shop and offices (former)
- Location: Micklegate, York, England
- Coordinates: 53.9561°N 1.0908°W
- Year built: Mid-19th century
- Renovated: 20th century (modernised)

Website
- micklegatesocial.co.uk

Listed Building – Grade II
- Official name: 150, Micklegate
- Designated: 14 March 1997
- Reference no.: 1257273

150 Micklegate is a Grade II listed building on the corner of Micklegate and Bar Lane in the city of York, England. Its Bar Lane elevation faces the city walls and the site lies close to Micklegate Bar. Originally built for commercial use, it was modernised in the 20th century and was included within the Central Historic Core conservation area in 1968. Since 2019 it has been occupied by Micklegate Social, a bar and café that also occupies neighbouring No. 148.

== History ==
The mid‑19th‑century commercial building on Micklegate stands on the corner with Bar Lane, where its Bar Lane frontage faces the York city walls across the road, and it lies close to Micklegate Bar. It was later modernised in the 20th century, including new shopfronts.

Trade directories record a sequence of occupants under different address numbers, reflecting changes to the building's shop units and the renumbering of Micklegate carried out by York Corporation in 1910. In 1851 the directory of Kingston-upon-Hull and York lists Anthony Brown at No. 54, and by 1885 The York Furnishing Company appears at Nos. 54 and 55. The 1913 Kelly's Directory of the North and East Ridings of Yorkshire records the glass and china dealer Walter Ward at No. 148, with no separate entry for No. 150.

In 1968 the site was included within the newly established Central Historic Core conservation area, and on 14 March 1997, No. 150 was designated a Grade II listed building. It stands next to Nos. 144–148, which are listed at Grade II*.

No. 150 in 2016 as Your Bike Shed, with Nos. 148 and 146 to the right and the city walls on the far left

In 2013 the combined café and bicycle workshop, York Bike Shed, opened in the building. In 2019 it reopened as Micklegate Social, a bar and café that also occupies neighbouring No. 148.

== Architecture ==
The ground floor is finished in dressed sandstone with textured panels, and the upper storey is built of orange‑red brick with cream‑brick pilasters and window surrounds. Stone and moulded brick are used for the main decorative details, and the slate roof has brick chimney stacks, one with a cornice.

The building stands on a corner plot and has two storeys, with two uneven bays facing Micklegate and four uneven bays facing Bar Lane, and a canted half‑bay at the corner. The shopfronts continue along both elevations, marked by pilaster piers on plain bases with moulded bands and a dentilled cornice. The corner bay contains a modern shop door, and the left‑hand bay on the Bar Lane side has double doors with recessed panels and a tall overlight leading to a staircase. Other ground‑floor openings contain modern shop windows or glazed folding doors.

On the first floor, the bays are divided by pilasters on panelled bases, supporting a continuous entablature with a moulded cornice and a low parapet. Each bay contains a round‑headed sash window set back within an arched surround with moulded details, and a moulded string course forms a sill band. On the Micklegate side, the first‑floor windows include a wide two‑light window with a semicircular head in the left bay and a narrower window in the right bay.

== See also ==
- Listed buildings in York (within the city walls, southern part)
