= 144–148 Micklegate =

Listed terrace in York, England

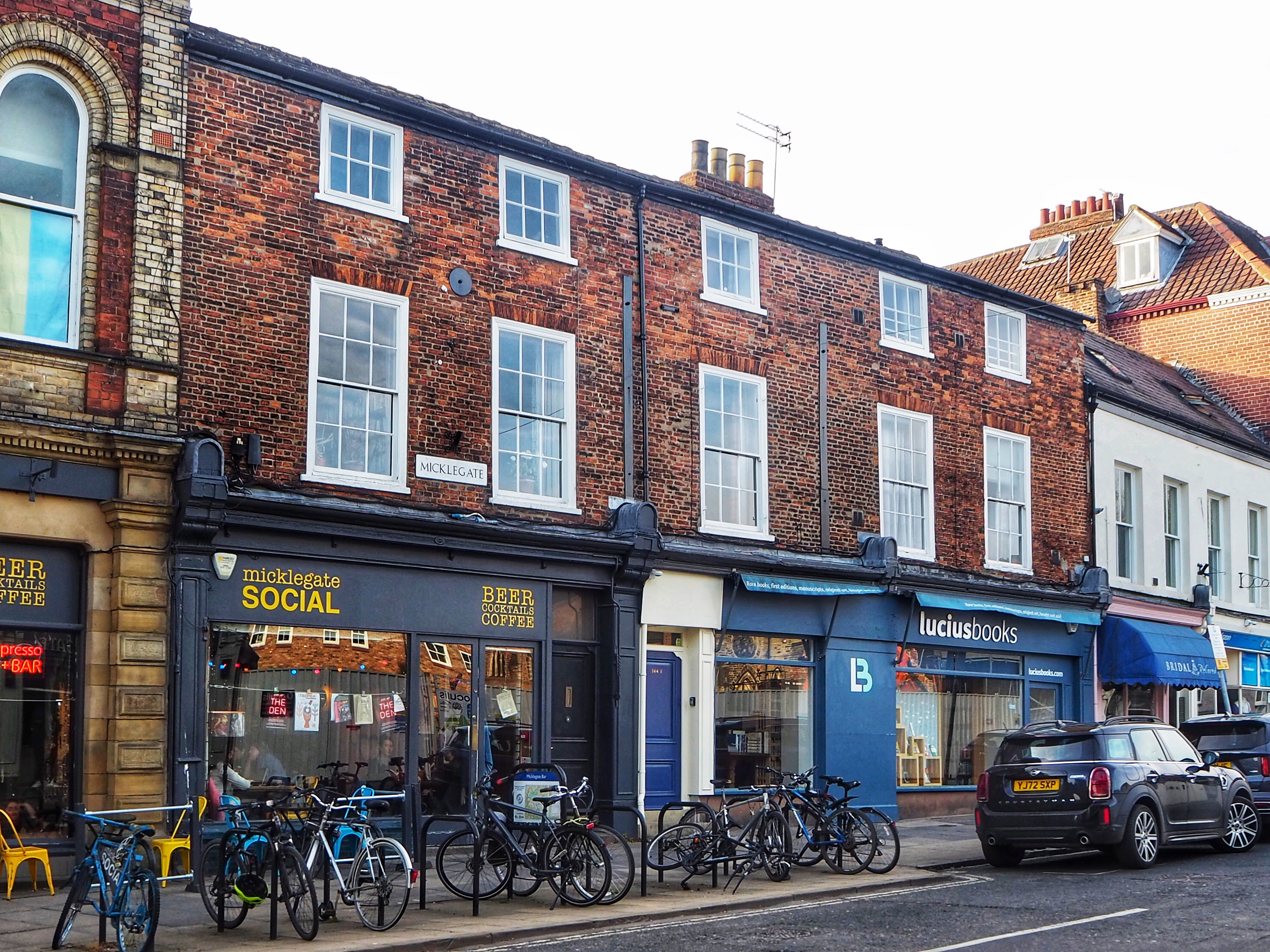
- The building in 2023; No. 148 is on the left

General information
- Status: Converted to mixed retail and hospitality uses
- Type: House (former)
- Location: Micklegate, York, England
- Coordinates: 53.9562°N 1.0907°W
- Year built: Late 17th century
- Renovated: Early 19th century (remodelled and subdivided); Mid-19th century (shopfronts); 20th century (altered)

Listed Building – Grade II*
- Official name: 144, 146 and 148, Micklegate
- Designated: 24 June 1983
- Reference no.: 1257272

144–148 Micklegate is a Grade II* listed terrace on Micklegate in the city of York, England. Originating in the late 17th century as a house, it incorporates earlier fabric and was remodelled, divided and heightened in the 19th century, with later shopfronts and further alterations in the 20th century. The terrace was included in the Central Historic Core conservation area in 1968 and stands between Nos. 138–142 and No. 150, all listed at Grade II. Today the ground floors of Nos. 144 and 146 are in retail use, while No. 148, together with neighbouring No. 150, houses Micklegate Social, a bar and café.

== History ==
The building stands on Micklegate and appears to have originated as a house associated with the Waller family, possibly incorporating parts of the early‑17th‑century "red‑brick house" built for Thomas Waller. Much of the late‑17th‑century work may have been undertaken for Robert Waller, sheriff in 1674–75, lord mayor in 1684 and MP in 1690, who died in 1698. In 1720 the freehold was sold by Ann Waller, widow of Matthew Waller, to the merchant Nathaniel Wilson; at that time the house was occupied by Thomas Selby, who remained there into the mid‑18th century. Later residents included members of the Wintringham, Lawson and Corneille families, with Major Bartholomew Corneille owning the property in the 1770s and his widow living there until 1806. The house then passed to William Gage and his daughters, who held it for many years, and it was probably Gage who rebuilt the upper part of the Micklegate frontage around 1810. The rear of the building largely preserves its late‑17th‑century form. It was remodelled and divided in the early 19th century, later heightened and re‑roofed, and given mid‑19th‑century shopfronts, with further alterations made in the 20th century.

In 1968 the site was included within the newly established Central Historic Core conservation area, and on 24 June 1983, Nos. 144–148 were designated a Grade II* listed building, The terrace stands between Nos. 138–142 and No. 150, which are listed at Grade II. The ground floors of Nos. 144 and 146 are now in retail use, while No. 148 houses Micklegate Social, a bar and café that also occupies neighbouring No. 150.

== Architecture ==
The front and rear wings are built of mottled orange brick, with stone dressings at the corners and shaped terminations to the gables; the later infill between the wings is of darker brick. The roof is slated, with brick chimney stacks, and the plan was originally H‑shaped.

The front has three storeys and five window bays. The shopfronts are simple in form, with plain pilasters and fascias, and a moulded cornice broken by projecting brackets with rounded tops. The shop doors are glazed and the windows are plate glass. A two‑panel door with an overlight gives access to the upper floors. On the first floor the windows are 12‑pane sashes with sills and flat brick arches, while the second floor has six‑pane pivoting windows, also with sills.

=== Interior ===
The staircase of No. 144, now reached through No. 142, runs from the first to the second floor and has an open string with slender turned balusters and a swept handrail. On the first floor the landing has a moulded cornice and two doorcases with carved rosettes, and the divided front room has a moulded cornice and panelled window surrounds. On the second floor two rooms keep painted cast‑iron fireplaces decorated with foliage and scalloped shelves.

At ground level within Nos. 146–148, a round arch on pilasters with moulded details and a panelled soffit leads to the rear stairhall, where there is a six‑panel door. The staircase rises from the ground to the second floor and has a close string, stick balusters, chamfered newels and small ball‑and‑pedestal finials. The rear room on the first floor retains full‑height panelling on two walls, a York range, a moulded cornice and a cased transverse beam. On the second floor two rooms have painted stone fireplaces with basket grates, and the doors are two‑panelled; the front room to the left has a blocked window in the gable wall. The building may preserve elements of what was known in the early 17th century as the first brick house in York, referred to as "le read-brick house" (Sic).

== See also ==
- Grade II* listed buildings in the City of York
- Listed buildings in York (within the city walls, southern part)
