= James Backhouse (botanist, 1825–1890) =

English botanist, archaeologist, and geologist (1825–1890)

James Backhouse (1825–1890) was an English botanist, archaeologist, and geologist. He was the son of James Backhouse (1794–1869), a botanist and missionary in Australia.

== Life ==
Backhouse was educated at Lawrence Street School, (which later became Bootham School), York. He worked in Norway, Ireland, and Scotland, and was particularly known for his work on the flora of Teesdale. He was a correspondent of Charles Darwin.

He was also a member of the Religious Society of Friends, also known as the Quakers.

James Backhouse is known as "James Backhouse (4)", because he was the fourth in a line of James Backhouses:

- James Backhouse (1), 1720–1798, the founder of Backhouse's Bank.
- James Backhouse (2), 1757–1804.
- James Backhouse (3), 1794-1869, the Quaker missionary and founder of the Backhouse Nursery.

His son was also a James Backhouse:

- James Backhouse (5), 1861–1945, best known as an ornithologist.
