= John Burton (antiquary) =

English physician and antiquary

John Burton, M.D. (1710–1771) was an English physician and antiquary.

== Early life ==
Burton was born at Colchester in 1710, and was educated at Merchant Taylors' School, London (1725–6), and at St John's College, Cambridge, where he was admitted in 1727 and graduated M.B. in 1733. In 1734 he was practising medicine at Heath, on the outskirts of Wakefield. He was a good Greek and Latin scholar, and attained no little eminence in his profession both in the city and county of York. Already displaying the strong support for the Tory party that he maintained throughout his life, Burton was vigorous on his party's behalf during the bitterly contested county election of 1734. His activities badly affected the success of the Whig interest in York, personified in the prominent local clergyman, the Rev. Dr Jaques Sterne. This sowed the seeds of the animosity between the two men that was to bedevil Burton for some years to come. On 2 January 1735, in York Minster, Burton married Mary (c.1715–1771), only child of Samuel Henson (d. 1716) and his wife, Mary (d. 1743); their only son, John, became an army officer. It was probably his wife's income that enabled Burton to continue his medical studies, under Herman Boerhaave at Leiden University, where he became acquainted with Heinrich van Deventer's teachings on midwifery; he was awarded MD from Reims. His first medical articles were published by the Edinburgh Philosophical Society in 1734 and 1736, and his Treatise of the Non-Naturals was printed at York in 1738. By then he had established his practice as physician and man-midwife in York, and he was a prime mover in establishing in 1740 the York County Hospital, where he was honorary physician until 1746. Also in 1740, he moved into The Red House, in York.

== The Sterne affair ==
Burton actively campaigned for the Tory interest in the elections of 1741, further incurring the hostility of Sterne, now Precentor of York Minster, and his nephew and political assistant, Laurence Sterne.

Burton's position was financially improved in 1743, when he inherited substantial estates on the deaths of his father and mother-in-law. Two years later he suffered a setback from which his reputation and his pocket never fully recovered. The occasion was the Jacobite rising of 1745. Burton travelled late in November to Lancashire, where Charles Edward Stuart's forces were marching south after their capture of Carlisle. His motives were unclear but his absence from York at this critical time strengthened the suspicion, fuelled by his Whig enemies, that he was going over to the Young Pretender. Burton was arrested on his return to York, and committed to York Castle on 30 November on a charge of treason. After three months' imprisonment he was summoned to London to be examined before the privy council, who finally released him on bail after examination in March 1747. He was tried at York assizes in July, but on account of the Act of Indemnity passed in June his prosecution was abandoned and he was discharged. He had been declared bankrupt and his furniture and books sold, leaving him with his wife's modest fortune.

== Recovery of reputation ==
Burton's political rehabilitation was marked by his appointment as commissioner for the land tax in 1750, 1765, and 1766, and by the offer in 1754 of the freedom of the city of York (which he did not accept). This is in spite of the fact that he was visited by two of his fellow prisoners from London, Flora Macdonald and Captain Malcolm McLeod, in 1747, 1748, and 1749. In 1749 he published two pamphlets to justify his conduct and proclaim his innocence. His medical practice took longer to resurrect. In 1751 he published An Essay towards a Complete System of Midwifery, in which the engraved plates are the earliest published work of George Stubbs. Burton's text shows signs of hasty composition which were perhaps partly due to his attempt to recover his damaged professional status but were principally due to his wish to forestall a book being written by the eminent London man-midwife, William Smellie, which was sure to publicize Smellie's improved obstetrical forceps. Smellie's Treatise on the Theory and Practice of Midwifery (1751) received warm praise from the Monthly Review, whereas Burton's Essay had been given a long, but cool review. Burton reacted by publishing A letter to William Smellie, M.D., containing critical and practical remarks upon his Treatise on Midwifery (1753). Smellie did not respond but a former pupil of his, Giles Watts, published a successful defence against Burton's criticisms in 1755. Burton's reputation does not seem to have suffered, and his own improved forceps remained in use for many years.

== Death ==
Burton died in the parish of Holy Trinity Church, Micklegate, York, on 19 January 1771, and Mary Burton died on 28 October following. At his death he was living in or near Micklegate in York; he was buried at Holy Trinity Church, Micklegate, York, on 21 January. Burton is commonly supposed to have resembled Laurence Sterne's satirical description of him the novel Tristram Shandy as the character Dr Slop: "a little, squat, uncourtly figure...of about four feet and a half perpendicular height, with a breadth of back, and a sesquipedality of belly". However, a sworn testimony of 1746 describes him as "a tall Well sett Gentleman".

== Printed works ==
His printed works are:

- Essay on Midwifery, 1761 and 1763.
- Monasticon Eboracense, vol. i. 1768 (the copy in the King's Library has the first eight pages of the intended second volume, entitled 'The Appendix, containing Charters, Grants, and other Original Writings referred to in the preceding volume, never published before,' York, N. Nickson, 1769).
- Two tracts on Yorkshire antiquities in Archæologia, 1768–1771.
