= St John's Church, Micklegate, York =

Listed former church in York, England

- Church of St John the Evangelist
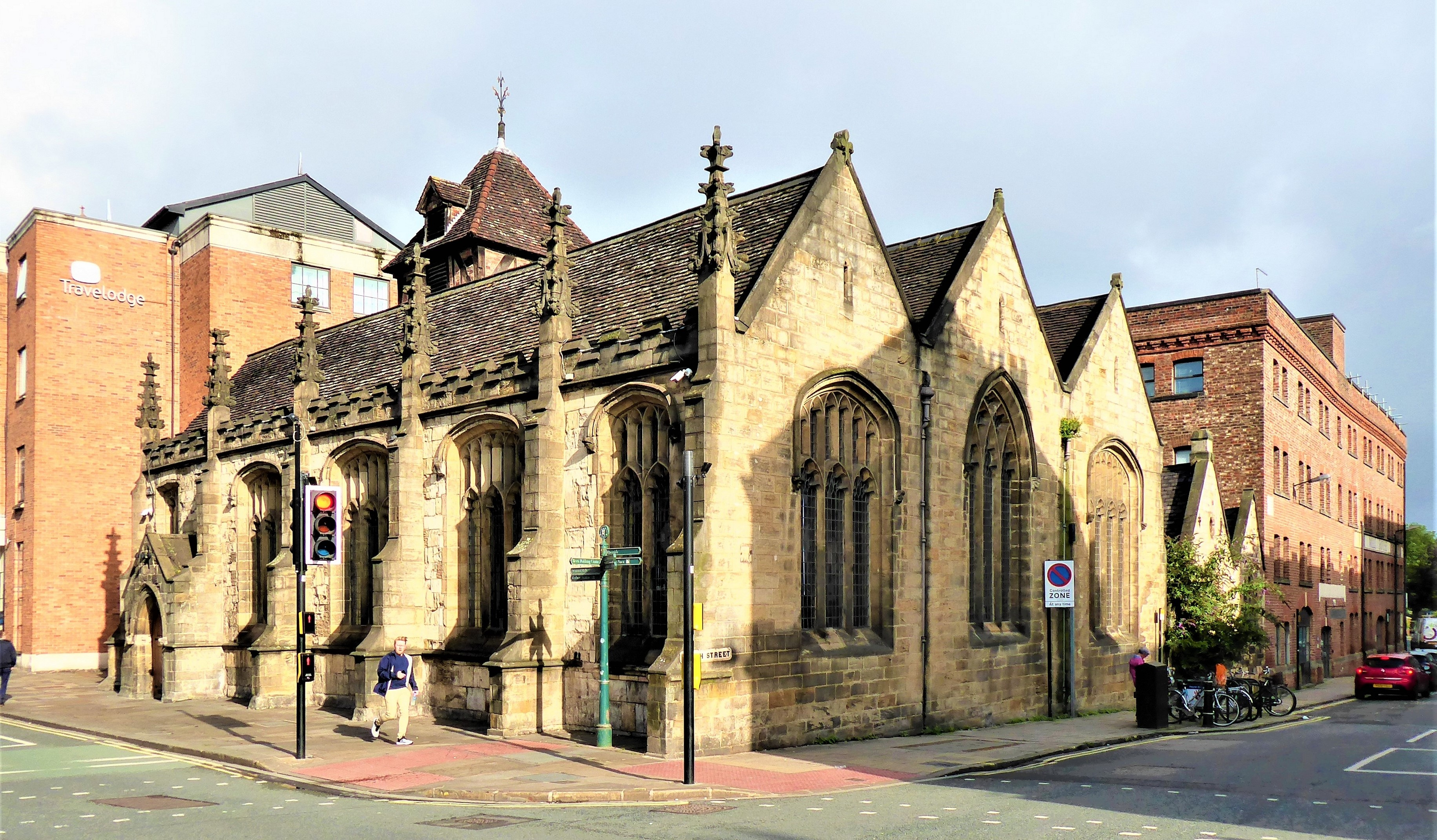
- St John's Church, Micklegate, York
- St John's Church, Micklegate, York
- 53°57′26.8″N 1°5′07.6″W
- OS grid reference: SE 60112 51652
- Location: Micklegate, York
- Country: England
- Previous denomination: Church of England

History
- Dedication: St John the Evangelist

Architecture
- Functional status: Cocktail bar
- Heritage designation: Grade II* listed
- Designated: 14 June 1954
- Architectural type: Parish church (former)
- Style: Gothic
- Closed: 1934 (as a church)

St John's Church is a Grade II* listed former parish church in the Church of England on Micklegate in the city of York.

== History ==
The church dates from the 12th century, the oldest part being the base of the tower. The chancel is 14th century. The north aisle and arcade were rebuilt, and the west end extended in the 15th century. The tower collapsed in 1551 and part of the north aisle was rebuilt.

The church was restored in 1850 by George Fowler Jones, when the south porch was added, and the east end rebuilt. The windows were reglazed, a new floor laid and new pews were added. In 1866 J. B. and W. Atkinson of York re-roofed the nave. In 1960, its east wall was rebuilt to allow Micklegate to be widened, and a new porch was added.

In 1934 the church was closed, and the Institute of Advanced Archaeological Studies used the building to store its collection. It later became York Arts Centre, and more recently has been used as a bar.

== Memorials ==
- Nathaniel Wilson (d. 1726)
- Elizabeth Wilson (d. 1736)
- Sir Richard Yorke (d. 1498)
- John Scott (d. 1775)
- Christopher Benson (d. 1801)
- Anne Haynes (d. 1747)
- Elizabeth Potter (d. 1766)
- Luke Thompson (d. 1743)
- Grace Potter (d. 1776)
- Thomas Bennett (d. 1773)
- Elizabeth Bennett (d. 1825)

== Organ ==
The pipe organ dated from 1866 and was by Postill. A specification of the organ can be found on the National Pipe Organ Register.

== See also ==
- Grade II* listed buildings in the City of York
- Listed buildings in York (within the city walls, southern part)
