= Micklegate =

Street in York, England

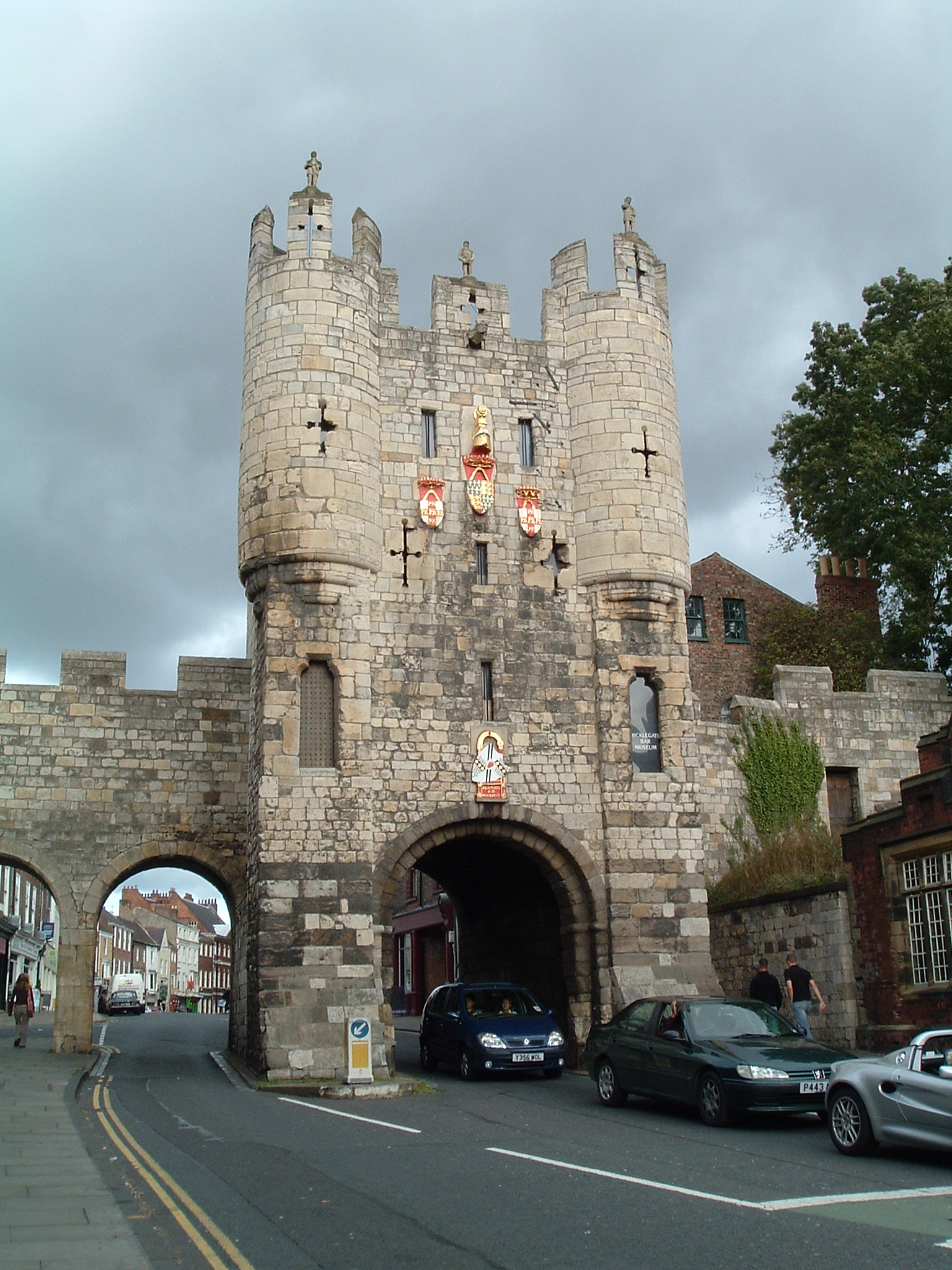
- Micklegate Bar, the southern entrance to York
- Location within York
- Area: York
- Coordinates: 53.9572°N 1.0884°W
- North east end: Bridge Street; North Street; Skeldergate
- Major junctions: Priory Street; Trinity Lane; George Hudson Street
- South west end: Blossom Street

Micklegate is a historic street in the city of York, England. The name means "Great Street", from the Old Norse gata for street.

York City Council describes Micklegate as "one of the most handsome streets in Yorkshire", and Nikolaus Pevsner called it "...without any doubt the most architecturally rewarding street in York". The street contains three medieval churches and four Grade I listed buildings, and most buildings are three or four-storey Georgian structures.

The name Micklegate is sometimes applied to a slightly broader area, including the side streets Toft Green, Priory Street, Trinity Lane and St Martin's Lane. The Micklegate ward for elections to the city council covers a larger area, spreading beyond the city walls.

== Geography ==
The street runs east from the York city walls at Micklegate Bar, long the main southern entrance to the city, continuing the route of Blossom Street. On its north side, it has junctions with Bar Lane, Barker Lane and George Hudson Street; and on the south side, with Priory Street, Trinity Lane, and St Martin's Lane.

Micklegate ends at the junction of North Street and Skeldergate. The continuation of the road in this direction is the short Bridge Street, which then crosses the River Ouse as Ouse Bridge. The street winds down a gentle slope towards the Ouse, and the council describes this, along with the number and density of historic buildings on the street, as defining its character. Because of its historic importance, and with Micklegate Bar regarded as the royal entrance to the city, it is relatively wide, compared to many streets in the city centre. Micklegate is also known for the attractive views along the street, particularly at the top and bottom ends.

== History ==
The street originated as part of a Roman road from Tadcaster to York, which ran through a civilian settlement in the Micklegate and Bishophill area, in the direction of the fortress on the other bank of the Ouse. Its alignment was altered in the Viking period, when the Ouse was bridged in a new location, and it has remained unaltered since. By this time, it was known as Great Street - "Myglagata" - which evolved to become "Micklegate".

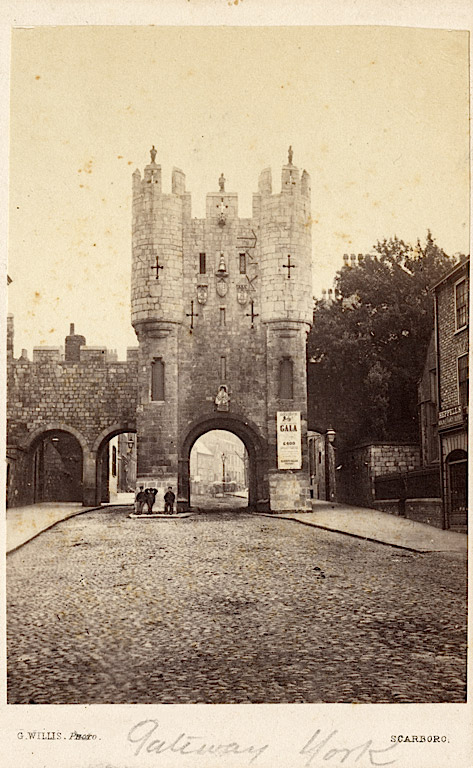
G. Willis (act. 1860s), Micklegate, York, England, 1860s, albumen print carte de visite, Department of Image Collections, National Gallery of Art Library, Washington, DC

During the medieval era, long burgage plots with narrow street frontages were allocated, and still form the basis for some building plots. By 1282, there were at least 118 built-up "tofts", evidence that its entire length had been built up. In 1586, William Camden described the street in Brittanica: "One gate named Micklegate Barre, the great gate from which a long and broad street reacheth to the bridge. The same street is beset with proper houses having gardens and orchards planted on either hand and behind them fields".

The street always had a mixed character, with houses of wealthy citizens of York, town houses of minor nobility from elsewhere in the county, smaller houses, shops and inns. The Butter Market, in front of St Martin's Church, set the prices for the entire north of England, although it declined and was demolished early in the 19th century.

In the Georgian period many wealthy citizens built large houses, particularly its middle and upper sections, while many other properties were given new facades, in contemporary styles.

The street remained the main access to the city from the south until the modern era but since the Victorian period, the street has been a less prestigious address, and the back gardens of many houses were built over and used for industry. George Hudson Street was created in 1877, linking Micklegate with York railway station, and this now forms the main southern for traffic into York city centre, along with the eastern stretch of Micklegate, the remainder of the street seeing relatively little traffic.

114 Micklegate was the birthplace of the architect J. A. Hansom, who invented the hansom cab.

== Notable buildings ==
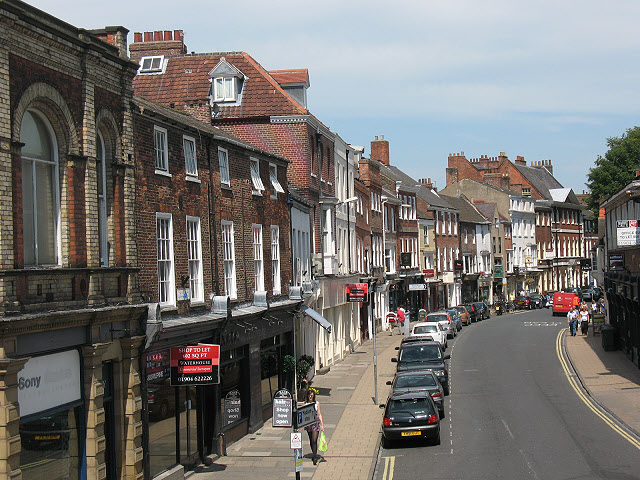
The top end of Micklegate, seen from Micklegate Bar

=== Micklegate Bar ===
The lower section of Micklegate Bar was built in the 12th century, and the top storeys in the 14th century. At least six reigning monarchs passed through the gate. A restoration of the Bar was completed in late 2017.

Following the Battle of Wakefield in the Wars of the Roses, the heads of Richard Plantagenet, 3rd Duke of York (father of Edward IV and Richard III), Edmund, Earl of Rutland (another son of Richard) and Richard Neville, 5th Earl of Salisbury were displayed on Micklegate Bar.

Micklegate Bar once had a barbican or outer gateway in front of it, which became ruinous and was demolished in 1826.

The City Walls Experience at Micklegate Bar (formerly the Henry VII Experience), is located in the gatehouse.

Micklegate Bar is referenced in the York Dungeon tourist attraction on Clifford Street, in the "Executioner" section of the dungeon.

=== Micklegate Bar to Trinity Lane ===
Notable buildings on the north side of the street include No. 150, a mid-19th-century commercial building now occupied by Micklegate Social bar and café; Nos. 144–148, with 17th-century origins; Nos. 138 and 142, also 17th-century; No. 136, built in 1740; Nos. 128–132, built in the mid-18th century; Nos. 122–126, partly dating from the 17th century; Nos. 118 and 120, built in about 1740; No. 114, constructed in the later 17th century; the early-16th-century No. 112, internally timber-framed and formerly the Red Lion pub; the late-17th-century Nos. 102 and 104; the Nags Head pub at No. 100, built about 1530 and with earlier origins; No. 98, built in the 1770s; The Falcon, an ancient inn with no part of its early buildings surviving but an 18th-century sign; No. 92, built about 1798; Micklegate House, the largest house on the street and a Grade I listed building; and the early-18th-century Bathurst House.

On the south side stand Gibsons at No. 129, originally the Bar Hotel; the 14th-century pub The Priory at No. 103; the timber-framed 16th-century No. 95; Nos. 85–89, built about 1500; the 18th-century No. 83; Holy Trinity Church, a Grade I listed parish church and the only remaining part of Micklegate Priory; and Nos. 77 and 79, built about 1790.

=== Trinity Lane to George Hudson Street ===
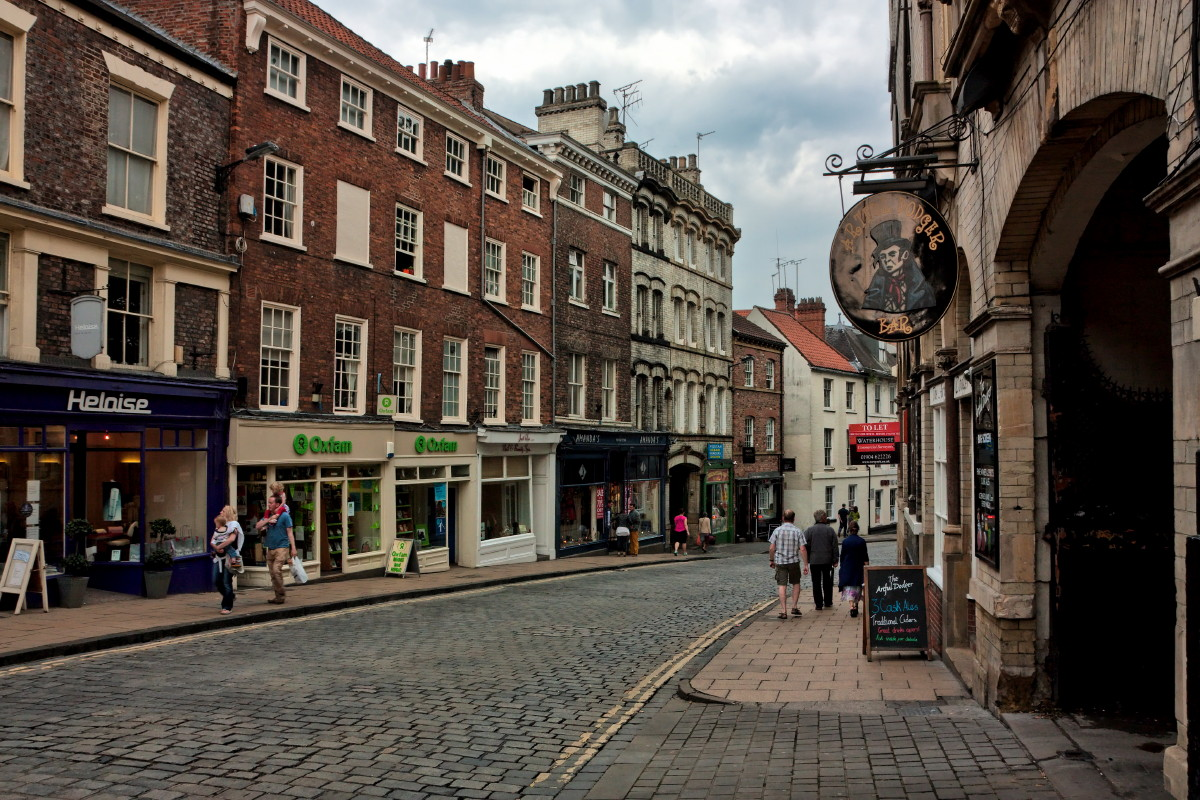
The middle section of Micklegate

On the north side of the street stand Nos. 74 and 76, dating from the mid-18th century; Nos. 70 and 72, with 15th-century origins; mid-17th-century No. 68; Nos. 62–66, built around 1840; late-18th-century Nos. 58 and 60; No. 56, of 17th-century origin; Garforth House, built in 1757; Nos. 42–48, originating in 1710; and the former Adelphi Hotel, largely rebuilt in the mid-19th century, but with some earlier material.

On the south side are Nos. 73 and 75, built in 1730; Nos. 69 and 71, originating about 1700, and No. 67, of similar date; late-18th-century No. 61; Nos. 57 and 59, built in 1783; Nos. 53 and 55, completed about 1755; Nos. 45–49, a mid-19th-century terrace; and St Martin-cum-Gregory, a Grade I listed church, currently used as a stained glass centre.

=== George Hudson Street to Bridge Street ===
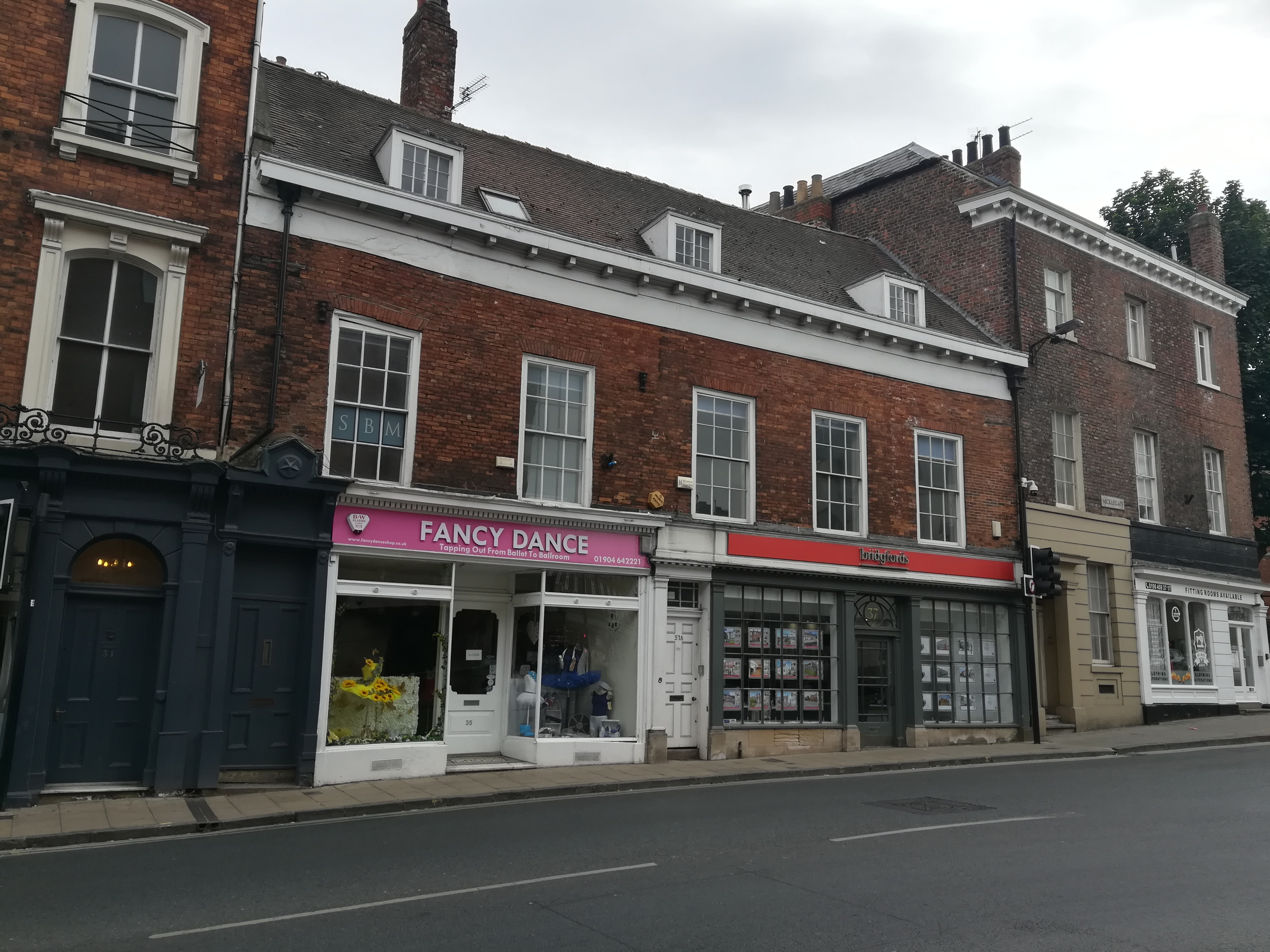
Buildings in the lower section of Micklegate

The medieval St John's Church, on the north side of the street, is a Grade II* listed building. After a period as the York Arts Centre, it is currently used as a bar.

On the south side of the street are Nos. 33–37, with a 17th-century wing; Nos. 23 and 25, with 17th-century sections; Nos. 19 and 21, of late-15th-century origin; and Nos. 11 and 13, built about 1740.

== Contemporary use ==
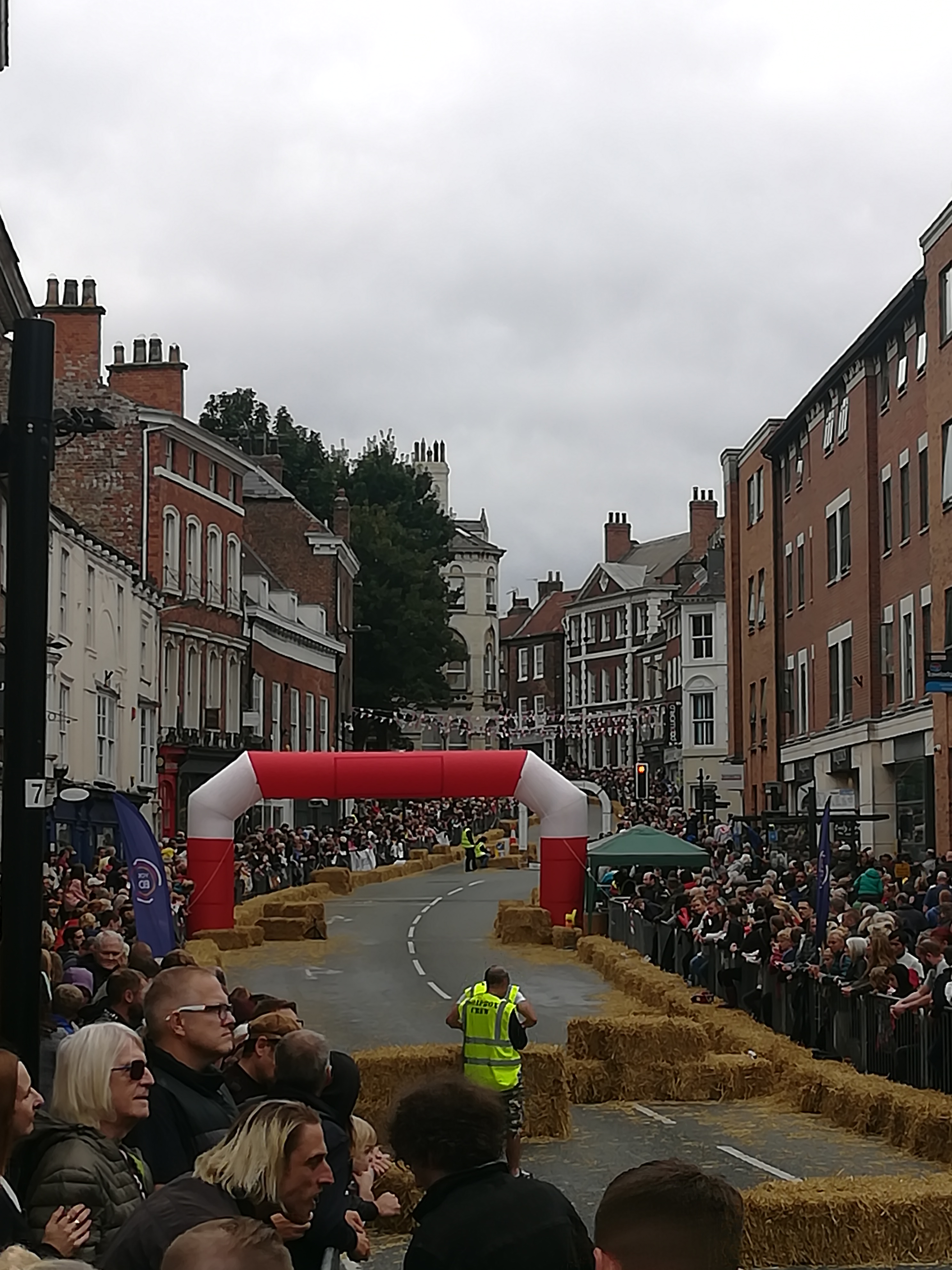
The annual Micklegate Run soapbox race attracts crowds to Micklegate

The street became famous for its pubs and clubs, being known as "The Micklegate Run" by many drinkers and club-goers in the late 20th century.

Writing in 2011, Avril Webster described Micklegate as remaining a "nice shopping area", with a "good selection of specialist shops". However, according to York City Council, although pedestrian use of the street is high, many businesses on the street have struggled in recent years.

== Sources ==
- Webster Appleton, Avril E. (2011). Looking Back at Micklegate, Nunnery Lane and Bishophill: York. York: Reeder Publications. ISBN 9780954346324.
