= The Falcon, York =

Listed pub in York, England

The Falcon
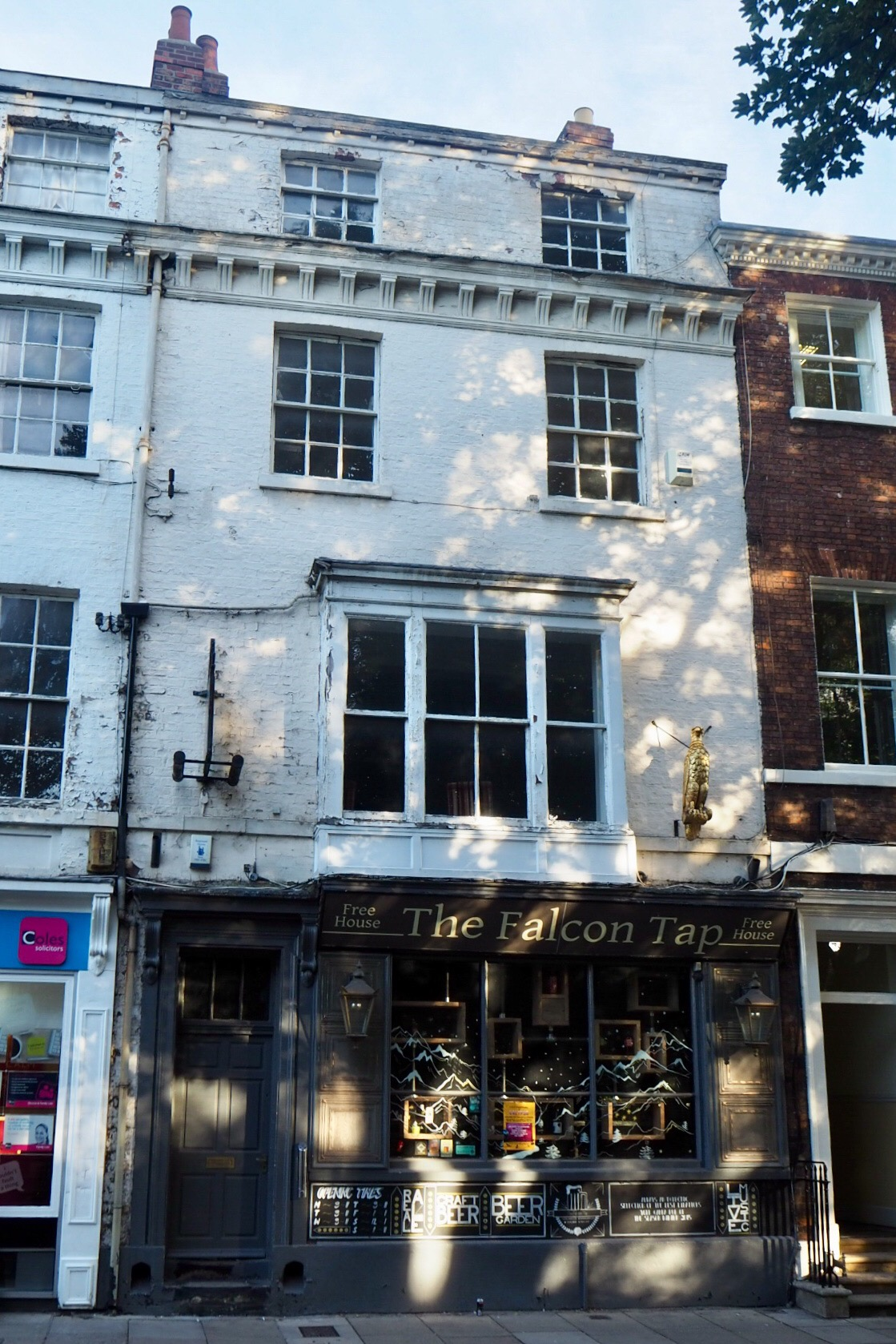
- The pub in 2018
- Former names: Rumours; The Falcon Tap

General information
- Type: Public house
- Location: 94–96 Micklegate, York, England
- Coordinates: 53.9570°N 1.0894°W
- Year built: c. 1842; 184 years ago

Website
- thefalconyork.com

Listed Building – Grade II
- Official name: The Falcon Inn (number 94)
- Designated: 19 August 1971
- Reference no.: 1257289

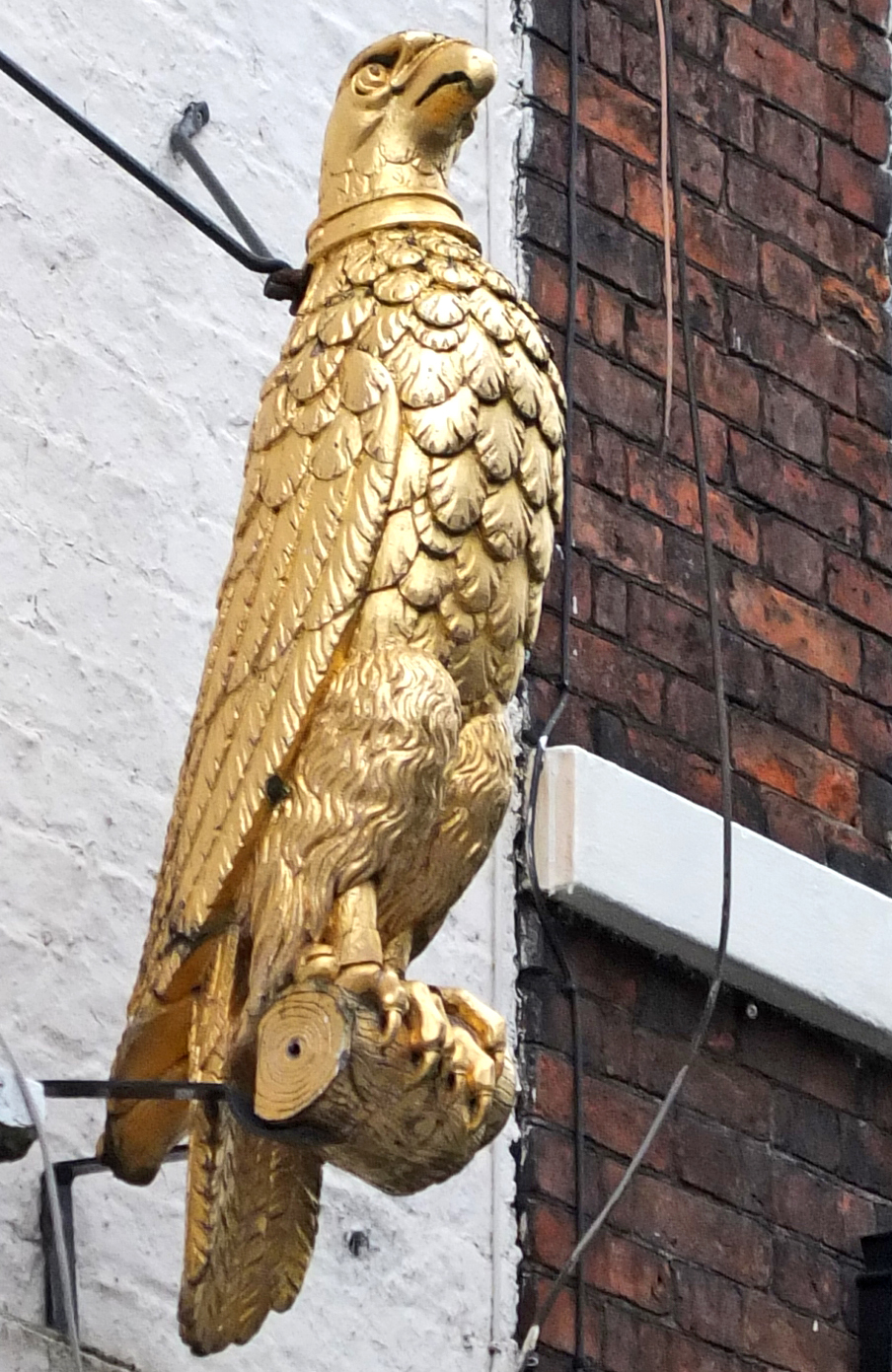
The falcon carving in 2012

The Falcon is a historic pub on Micklegate in the city centre of York, England.

The establishment originated as an inn named The Falcon in the 18th century. It was first recorded in 1715, and in 1736, Francis Drake named it one of two notable inns on the street. In 1818, William Hargrove described it as the most notable inn on the road. Its site stretched back to Tanner Row, where its stables were located. With the opening of York railway station, the stagecoach trade declined, and the inn struggled. In 1842–43, the site was redeveloped, being divided between a smaller pub (now 94 Micklegate) and a neighbouring house (now 96 Micklegate). The only surviving feature of the inn was a gilded carved figure of a falcon, acting as a pub sign.

The Victorian buildings have three storeys and an attic, and largely original sash windows above the ground floor. The pub also has a bay window on the first floor. There is a substantial cornice above the second floor. Inside, No. 96 retains an original staircase, but the property has been converted into a shop. Since 1971, the pair of buildings has been Grade II listed.

In 1981, a new cellar was added underneath the rear yard of The Falcon. In 2002, the pub was converted into a bar named "Rumours". However, in 2014 it returned to operating as a pub, under the name The Falcon Tap, and the original cellar was reopened. In 2017, permission was received to demolish modern rear extensions, and replace them with nine flats, and two more on the upper floors of the main building, while also halving the area of the bar. By 2018, it was listed in the Good Beer Guide.

In 2018, it was purchased by Almero Holdings and closed unexpectedly for conversion into an aparthotel, intending to retain the pub on the ground floor. In 2022, it reopened, as "The Falcon", run by the owners of the Turning Point Brewery.

== See also ==
- Listed buildings in York (within the city walls, southern part)
