= Doctor Slop =

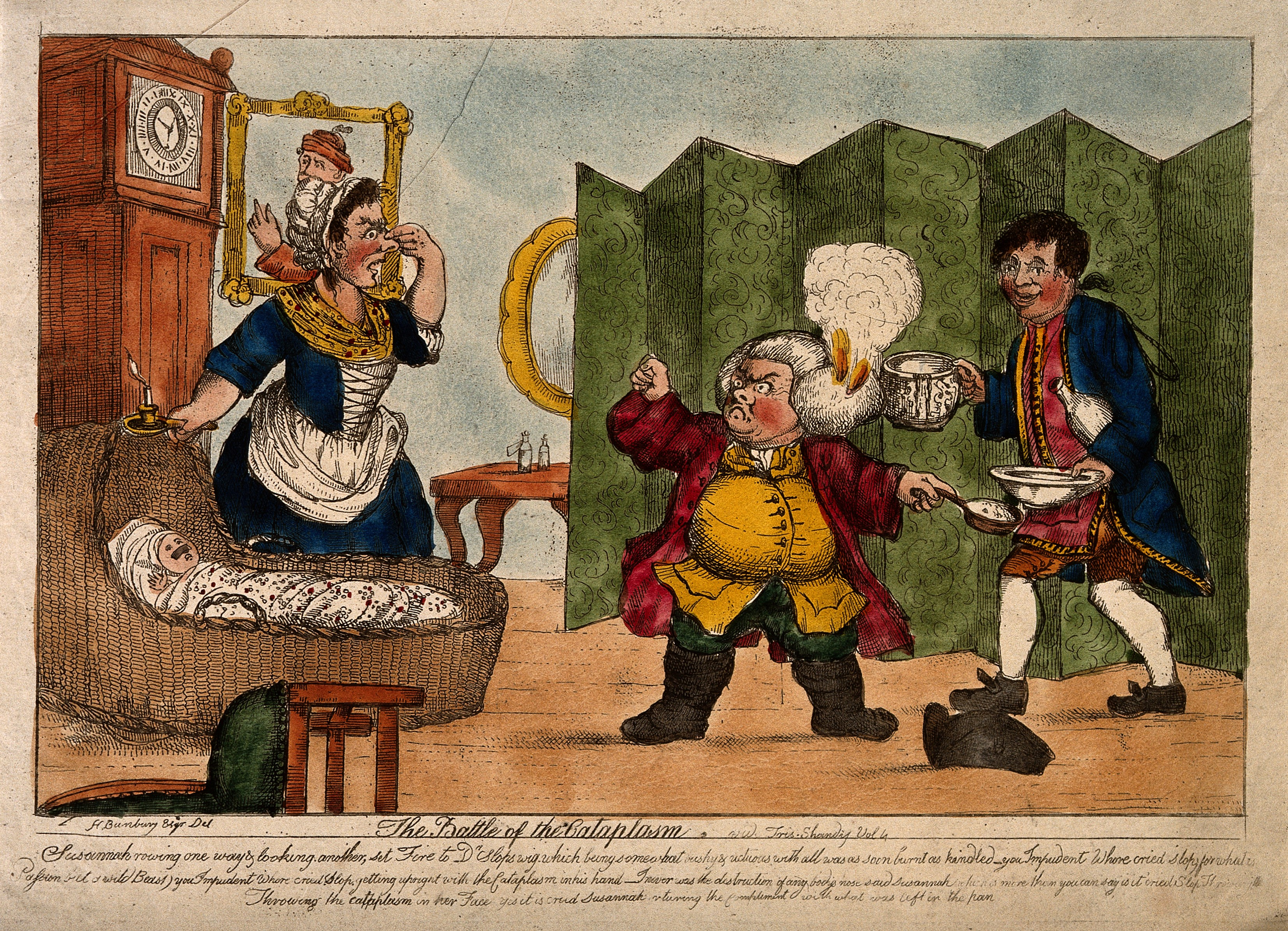
Coloured etching of Dr. Slop with his wig on fire angrily gesticulating to Susannah, who holds her nose near the wounded baby.

Dr Slop is a choleric physician and "man-midwife" in Laurence Sterne's novel The Life and Opinions of Tristram Shandy, Gentleman (1759).

The doctor is summoned by Tristram Shandy's father to attend his son's imminent birth. Slop makes his first appearance in Chapter 34 of the novel, where he is described as:

"... a little squat, uncourtly figure ... about four feet and a half perpendicular height, with a breadth of back, and a sesquipedality of belly, which might have done honour to a serjeant in the horse-guards."

He is portrayed as an incompetent quack, arriving at Shandy Hall having forgotten his array of "vile instruments" and "obstetrical engines", which have to be urgently sent for. In performing a forceps delivery of the baby, Slop damages the infant Tristram's nose, much to his father's consternation, and is obliged to perform a rudimentary rhinoplasty using cotton thread and a piece of whalebone from a maid's corset.

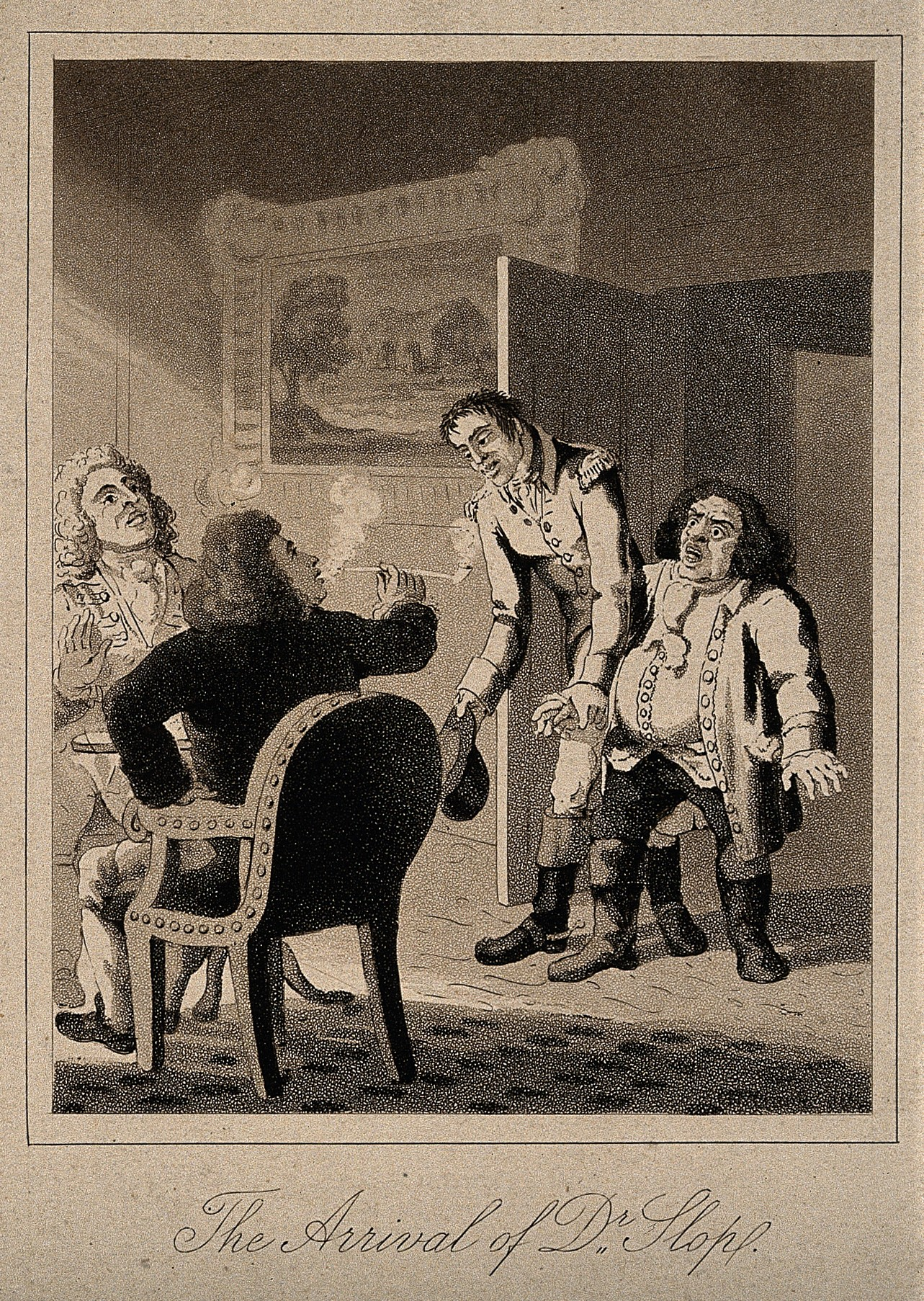
Dr. Slop arriving at the home of Tristram Shandy

Sterne partially based the character of Slop on Dr John Burton (1710–71), author of An Essay towards a Complete System of Midwifery (1751), in which the engraved plates are the earliest published work of George Stubbs. Burton, a Catholic and a Jacobite sympathiser, had fallen foul of Sterne's uncle, the Rev. Jacques Sterne DD, who had Burton arrested upon suspicion of sedition during the rebellion of 1745.

Slop has been listed as one of the "Ten Best Bad Doctors" in literature.

The doctor's involvement in the birth of Tristram and the resulting facial mutilation is in keeping with the obstetrical blunders of the time. His presence reflects a general level of concern on behalf of husbands for the safety of their wives, given the dogmatic and often harmful notions put forth in treatises intended to instruct midwives on the topic, to which doctors were not necessarily beholden. The usage of forceps on the part of doctors is one such instance where the two parties diverged. However, Dr. Slop's inclusion in the delivery drama was nonetheless a result of Walter Shandy's insistence on the podalic version of Tristram's fetus. The traumatic outcome of the birth is ultimately indicative of the hazardous nature of childbirth at the time as well as the inadequacy (sloppiness) of those at the cutting edge of the medical profession.
