= 19 and 21 Micklegate =

Listed building in York, England

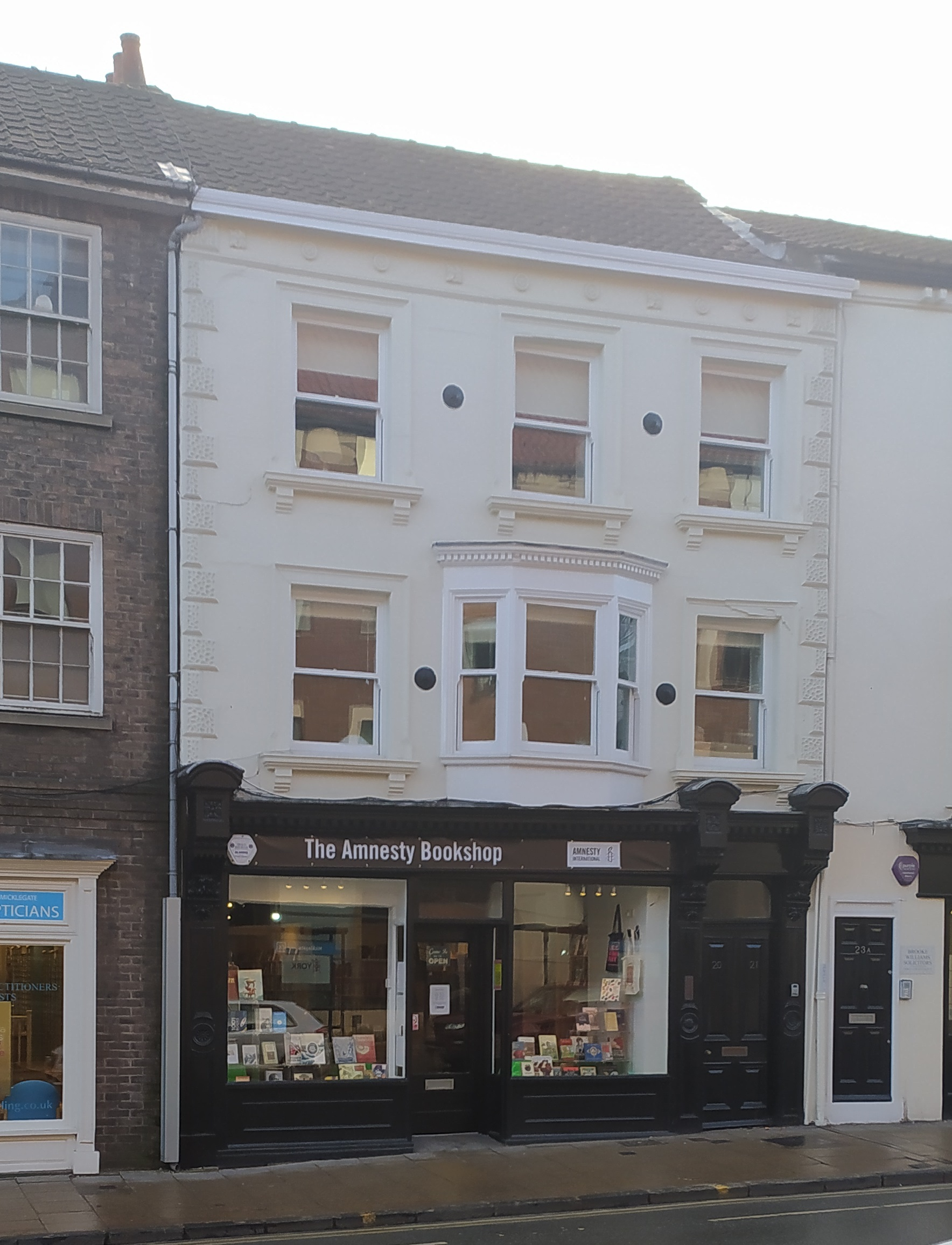
- The building in 2023
- Interactive map of the 19 and 21 Micklegate area

General information
- Status: Converted to retail use
- Type: House (former)
- Location: Micklegate, York, England
- Coordinates: 53.95719°N 1.08597°W
- Year built: Late 15th century
- Renovated: c. 1600 (rear wing added); Early 18th century (altered); Late 19th century (remodelled and shopfronts)

Listed Building – Grade II
- Official name: 19 and 21, Micklegate
- Designated: 19 August 1971
- Reference no.: 1257358

19 and 21 Micklegate is a historic building in the city centre of York, England.

The three-storey front range of the building, facing onto Micklegate, was constructed in the late 15th century. An annexe was added at the back in the 16th century, then in about 1600, a rear wing was added behind No. 21, all of this work being timber framed. Originally, the frames were infilled with tiles, but most of these have since been replaced with brick. The front was originally jettied, but in the early 18th century these were removed, and the building was refronted in brick, covered in stucco. In the late 19th century, the building was partly remodelled, and shopfronts were added on the ground floor.

The building stretched further east until 1966, when the part which formed No. 17 was demolished. The demolished building had been heavily altered through conversion into a shop. It was occupied by a painters' business from about 1779 until 1889, and it had one painted room, with papier mache borders, which dated from that period. In 1971, the surviving part of the building was Grade II listed. It stands next to Nos. 23–25, also listed at Grade II.

Inside, much of the timber framing survives, including the altered 15th-century roof and original floor joists. Other early work includes the staircase in the rear wing, the chimney stack, a fireplace and oven on the ground floor, and a further fireplace on the first floor.

Since 2022, the ground floor of the building has been occupied by a bookshop run by Amnesty International.

== See also ==
- Listed buildings in York (within the city walls, southern part)
