= Micklegate House =

Grade I listed building in York, England

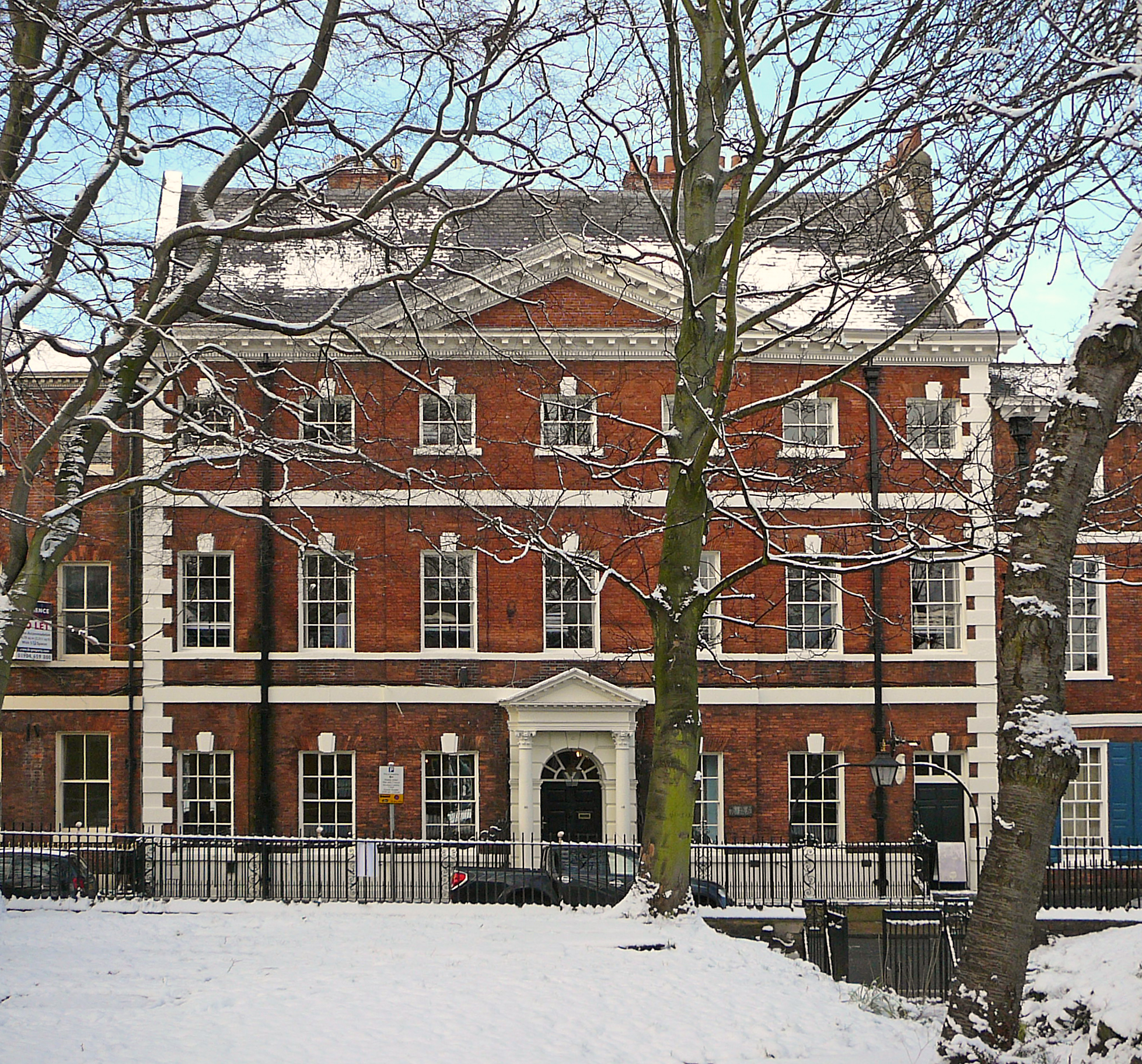
- The building in 2009

- Location within York City Centre

General information
- Status: Converted to hostel use
- Type: Townhouse (former)
- Location: 88 and 90 Micklegate, York, England
- Coordinates: 53°57′25″N 1°05′21″W
- Year built: 1752
- Renovated: 19th and 20th centuries (altered and extended)
- Client: John Bourchier

Design and construction
- Architect: John Carr (probable)
- Designations

Listed Building – Grade I
- Official name: Micklegate House and attached railings and lamp brackets
- Designated: 14 June 1954
- Reference no.: 1257285

Website
- Official website

Micklegate House is a Grade I listed building in the city of York, England.

The house lies on Micklegate, in the city centre. It was completed by 1752 as a townhouse for John Bourchier of Beningbrough Hall. It is often said to have been designed by John Carr, a local architect, as it is similar to other designs by him, although there is no firm evidence of this attribution.

Bourchier died in 1759, and the house passed to his wife. When she died in 1796, it was leased to James Walker, then to Joshua Crompton, who bought the freehold in 1815 and whose descendants lived in the property until 1896. The house was then used as business premises, and many of the fittings were sold, most of the best being moved to Treasurer's House.

The house is the largest on the street, has three storeys and is seven bays wide. The front is of orange-red brick, with stone dressings, and the rear of pink brick. Some original sash windows survive, as do a fireplace and bread oven on the second floor. The hall retains rich decoration and a grand staircase to the first floor, and the dining room and library on the ground floor also retain some original fittings.

The house was listed in 1954, along with its railings and lamp brackets. The house was used by the University of York. In the 1960s it housed the Department of Mathematics, while from 1978–1996 it housed the Department of Archaeology before it moved to King's Manor. In 2015, it was converted into the Safestay hostel.

== See also ==
- Grade I listed buildings in the City of York
- Listed buildings in York (within the city walls, southern part)
