= Ralph Paynel =

Sheriff of Yorkshire

Ralph Paynel or Paganel (fl. 1089) was an 11th-century Norman, a landowner, partisan of William II of England, and sheriff of Yorkshire.

== Life ==
Paynel was probably a member of the Norman family which held land in the Duchy of Normandy at Montiers Hubert (now Les Moutiers-Hubert, Calvados), and in the honour of Lieuvin, south of Beuzeville (now in Eure).

In 1086 Paynel held ten lordships in Devon, five in Somerset, 15 in Lincolnshire, 15 in Yorkshire, and others in Gloucestershire and Northamptonshire. He received the lands which had belonged to Merleswain.

In 1088 Paynel was sheriff of Yorkshire, and seized the lands of William of St. Calais, the bishop of Durham, at the command of William II, whose cause he defended at the meeting at Salisbury in November 1088. In 1089 he refounded the priory of Holy Trinity, York, and made it a cell to Marmoutier Abbey; to it he gave Drax, his chief Yorkshire vill.

== Family ==
With his wife Matilda, Paynel had four sons: William Paynel, Jordan, Elias, and Alan.

== Notes ==
=== Attribution ===
This article incorporates text from a publication now in the public domain: Lee, Sidney, ed. (1895). "Paganel, Ralph". Dictionary of National Biography. Vol. 43. London: Smith, Elder & Co.
