= St Martin-cum-Gregory's Church, Micklegate, York =

Grade I listed church in York, England

St Martin-cum-Gregory's Church
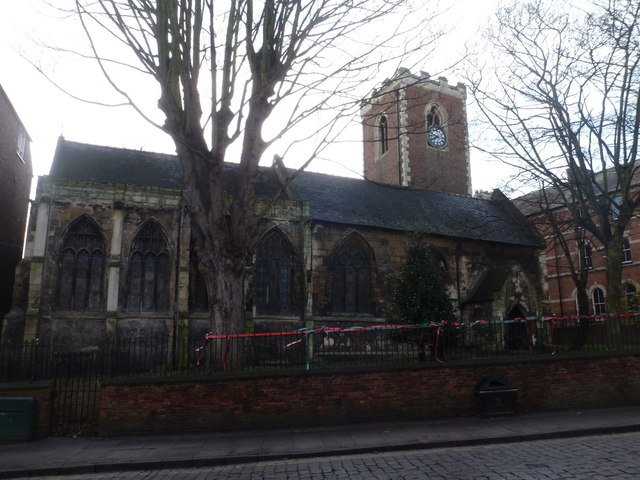
- The church in 2011
- St Martin-cum-Gregory's Church
- 53°57′25.4″N 1°5′13.5″W
- OS grid reference: SE 60005 51609
- Location: Micklegate, York
- Country: England
- Previous denomination: Church of England
- Website: Official website

History
- Status: Redundant church
- Dedication: St Martin, St Gregory

Architecture
- Functional status: Preserved
- Heritage designation: Grade I listed
- Designated: 14 June 1954
- Style: Gothic

St Martin-cum-Gregory's Church is a Grade I listed former parish church in the Church of England in York.

== History ==
The church dates from the 11th century. The north and south arcades are 13th century. The north aisle dates from the mid-14th century. The chancel, chapels and arcades were rebuilt around 1430.

Originally only dedicated to St Martin, the church acquired its current name when it merged with St Gregory's Church in 1585.

The north porch was added in 1655, and in 1677 the west tower was refaced with brick. The upper stages of the tower were rebuilt again between 1844 and 1845 by J. B. and W. Atkinson of York.

The church was restored in 1875 when the interior was cleared of the old square pews, the west gallery, and the organ. The floor was levelled and laid with red and black tiles. The columns, arcades and walls were scraped and repaired. The roof of the nave was restored and painted. The organ was enlarged by Mr Denman of Skeldergate. New seating was fitted in the nave and Gurney stoves were introduced for heating.

A further restoration was carried out in 1894 when the chancel was re-roofed.

The parish was united with Holy Trinity Church, Micklegate, in 1953.

Since being made redundant by the Church of England it served as a public hall and in 2008 it was developed as a stained-glass centre.

== Clock ==
A clock was installed in 1680. This was replaced by a new clock with an illuminated dial installed in 1860, built by Cooke and Sons.

== See also ==
- Grade I listed buildings in the City of York
- Listed buildings in York (within the city walls, southern part)
