= Micklegate Priory =

Benedictine monastery in York, England

Coordinates: 53°57′22″N 1°05′19″W

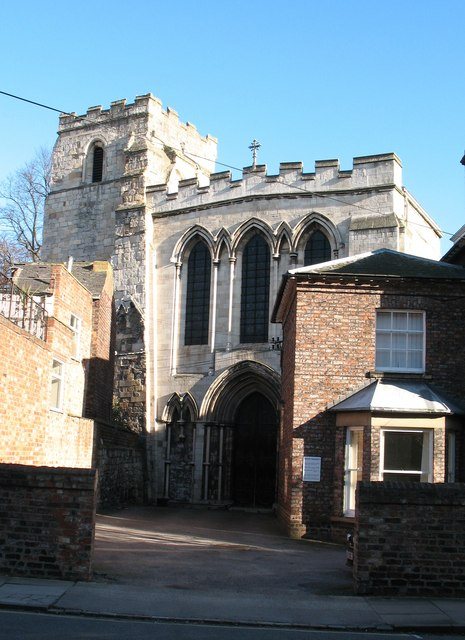
Tower of Micklegate Priory, now part of Holy Trinity church in York

Micklegate Priory, York was a Benedictine monastery founded in 1089 by Ralph Paynel, and dedicated to the Holy Trinity. It fronted on Micklegate, in the city of York, England, and the site had previously been used for Christ Church, a house of secular canons.

The site is now that of Holy Trinity Church.

Holbeck Manor, south of Leeds, belonged to the priory, and after the Dissolution of the Monasteries passed to the Darcy and Ingram families.
