= Star Pubs & Bars =

Pub arm of Heineken UK

Star Pubs Trading Limited is the pub arm of Heineken UK, the UK subsidiary of Dutch multinational brewing company Heineken. Heineken acquired the pubs as a result of its takeover of Scottish & Newcastle in a joint purchase with Carlsberg in 2008. As of 2024, the company currently runs around 2,400 pubs in the UK.

Following the acquisition, Scottish & Newcastle's pub division, S&N Pub Enterprises was initially rebranded as Scottish & Newcastle Pub Co before rebranded as Star Pubs & Bars, bringing an end to Scottish & Newcastle brand.

In 2014, the company sold 111 pubs to rival pub company Admiral Taverns. In 2017, 1,900 pubs were acquired from Punch Pubs, as part of a deal with Patron Capital. In September 2019 Star sold 150 tenanted community pubs to Admiral. During the COVID-19 pandemic, the company offered its tenants rent concessions to help them deal with the financial burden of being forced to close.

In 2020, the Pubs Code Adjudicator fined Star for forcing tenant landlords "to sell unreasonable levels of Heineken beers and ciders when they requested to go free of tie. This was despite repeated regulatory interventions and clear arbitration rulings from the PCA."

In May 2023, Heineken pledged to invest around £40 million in its UK pubs. "The global brewing giant said the investment will upgrade 570 pubs, almost a quarter of its UK venues", according to The Independent. Star "has injected more than £51 million into its estate since September last year", according to the Morning Advertiser in November 2023.

The company currently runs around 2,400 pubs across the UK.
