= The Old Rectory, Tanner Row =

Listed building in York, England

The Old Rectory
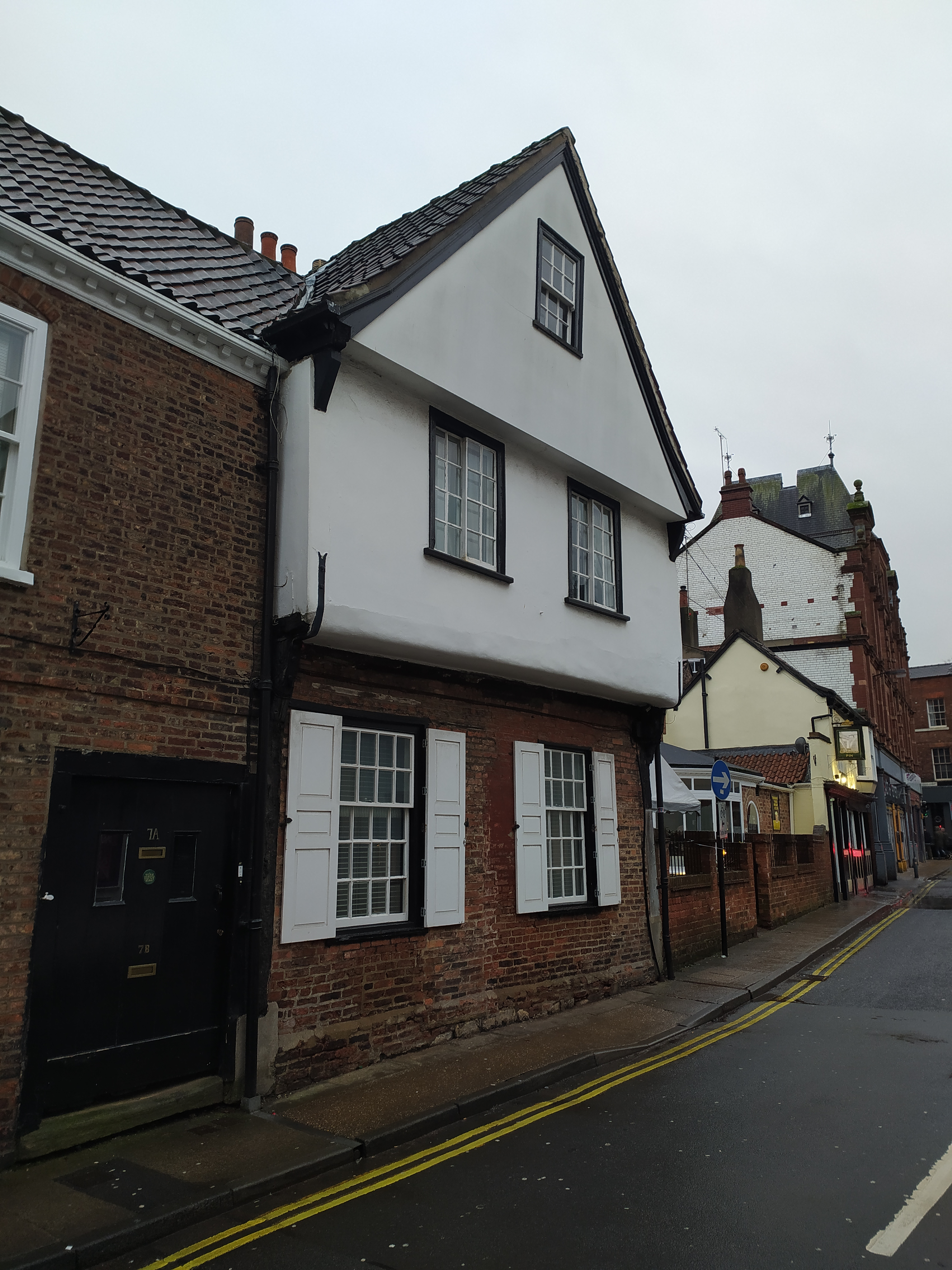
- The building in 2022
- Interactive map of the The Old Rectory area

General information
- Location: Tanner Row, York, England
- Coordinates: 53°57′31″N 1°05′12″W
- Completed: c. 1600
- Renovated: Late 17th century (converted); 19th and 20th centuries (altered)

Technical details
- Floor count: 2 + attic

Design and construction
- Designations

Listed Building – Grade II*
- Official name: The Old Rectory
- Designated: 14 June 1954
- Reference no.: 1256470

The Old Rectory is a historic building in the city centre of York, England.

The building was constructed in about 1600, possibly as a warehouse, on the south side of Tanner Row. In the late 17th century, a chimney stack was inserted, and this probably represents its conversion into a house. The building was altered in the 19th and 20th centuries; in 1937, a new staircase from Alne House was inserted, this having been constructed in about 1640. At the time, it served as the rectory to All Saints' Church, North Street; the rector, Patrick Shaw, incorrectly claimed that the building had been constructed in 1498, and inscribed that date in plaster on the rear of the building. In the 1970s, the house was instead occupied by the vicar of St Mary Bishophill Junior. In 1954, the building was Grade II* listed.

The building is timber-framed, with three bays, and two storeys plus an attic. It does not appear to have originally had any internal partitions, supporting the theory that it was built as a warehouse. On the Tanner Row front, it is jettied at both the first floor and eaves levels, with the eaves being gabled. It is now accessed through a passageway which leads through neighbouring 7 Tanner Row, although that house is of later date. The windows are all sashes, with the attic one dating to about 1700. The right facade has three original window openings and one a later insertion, although the ground floors windows are now blocked. The timber framing is exposed through much of the building.

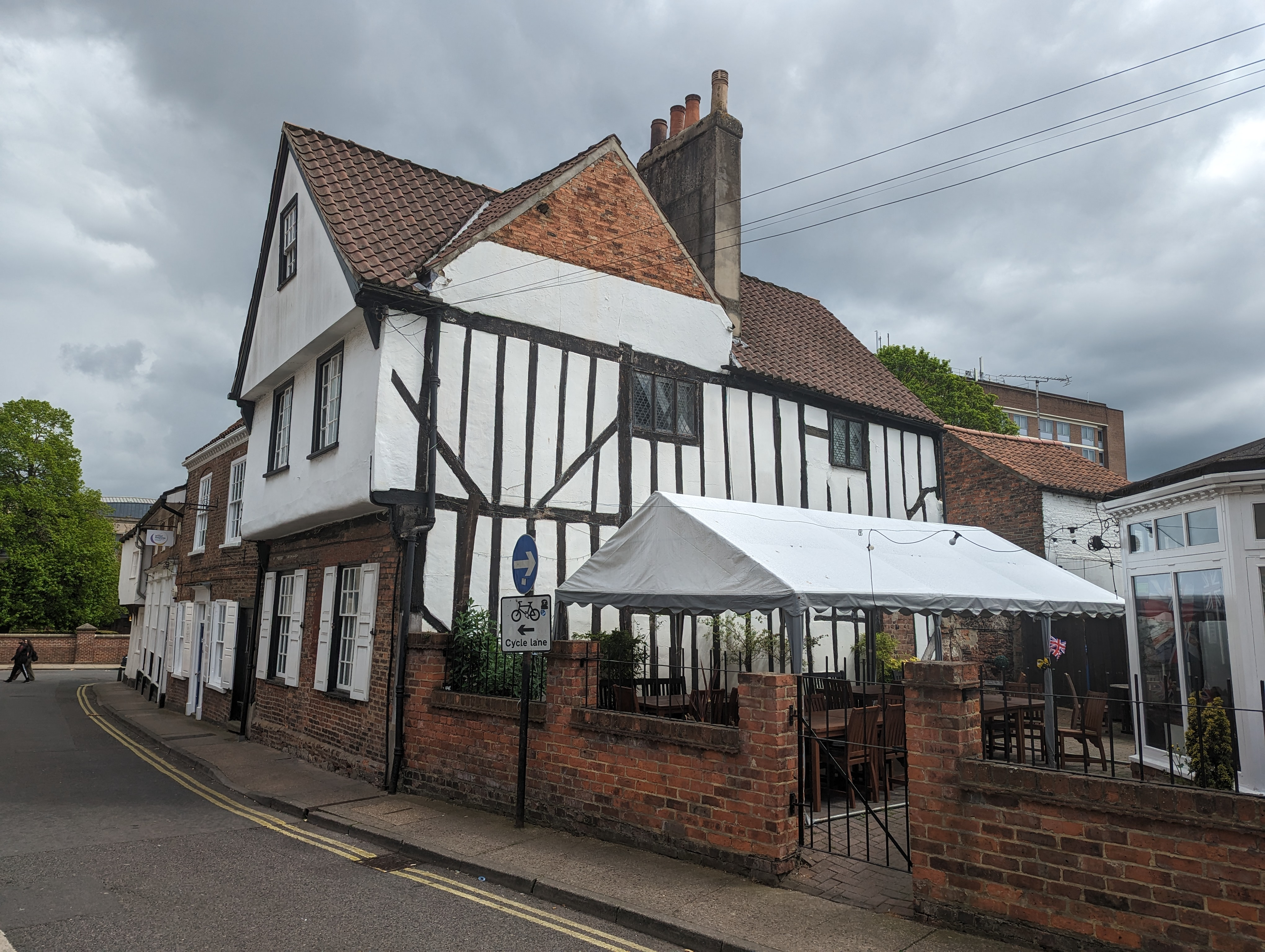
View from the west, in 2023

== See also ==
- Grade II* listed buildings in the City of York
- Listed buildings in York (within the city walls, southern part)
