= Church Cottages, York =

Listed building in York, England

Church Cottages
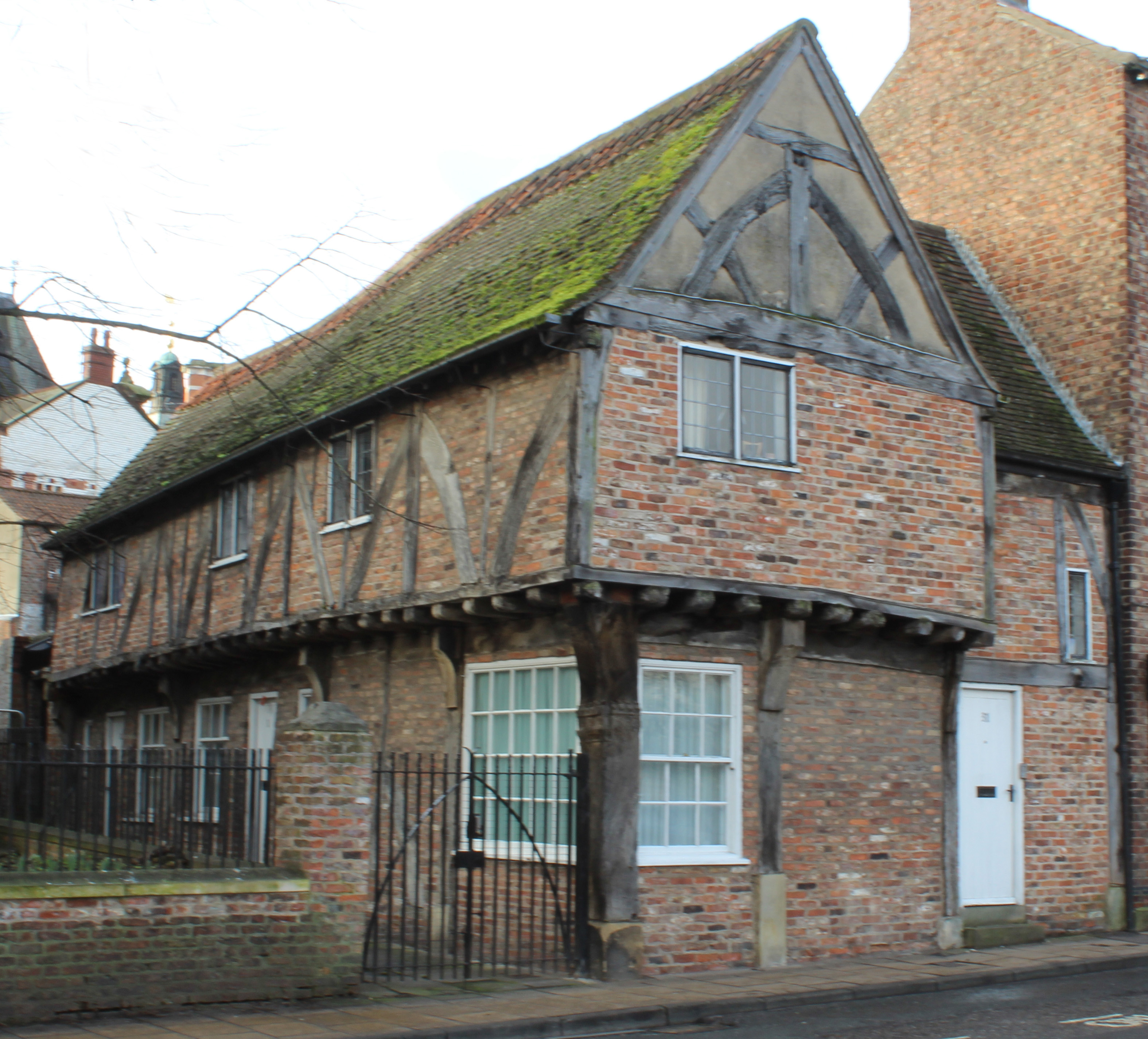
- The building in 2015
- Interactive map of the Church Cottages area

General information
- Location: All Saints Lane, York, England
- Coordinates: 53°57′31″N 1°05′10″W
- Completed: Late 15th century
- Renovated: 20th century (modernised)

Technical details
- Floor count: 2

Design and construction
- Designations

Listed Building – Grade II*
- Official name: Church Cottages
- Designated: 14 June 1954
- Reference no.: 1257063

Church Cottages is a terrace of timber-framed houses, in the city centre of York, England.

The terrace dates from the late 15th century. It runs along All Saints Lane, its gable end being on North Street. It faces All Saints' Church, and is likely to have been owned by the church since its construction. It is four bays long; the two south-eastern bays each form the basis of a house, while the two smaller north-western bays are deeper and together form a third house. The two fronts facing the streets are jettied. The terrace has two storeys and a king post roof truss, which can be seen in the gable end; like the rest of the walls, the timber is infilled with brick.

Although no original windows survive, there is an 18th-century oriel window, and the other windows are 19th-century sashes. Each property has an 18th-century fireplace. The staircases are replacements, and are steep, similar in form to a ladder.

From the 1920s to the 1960s, the north-western property was used as a shop. Once it closed, the building sat empty for several years until it was modernised as part of a general renovation of the street. A passage to the rear yard through the rear part of the north-western bays being filled in. The work was completed in 1974, and the property has since been residential.

The Press described the terrace as being "not a particularly famous building: but it is very distinctive". It has been Grade II* listed since 1954.

== See also ==
- Grade II* listed buildings in the City of York
- Listed buildings in York (within the city walls, southern part)
