= 39 North Street and 1 Tanner Row =

Listed building in York, England

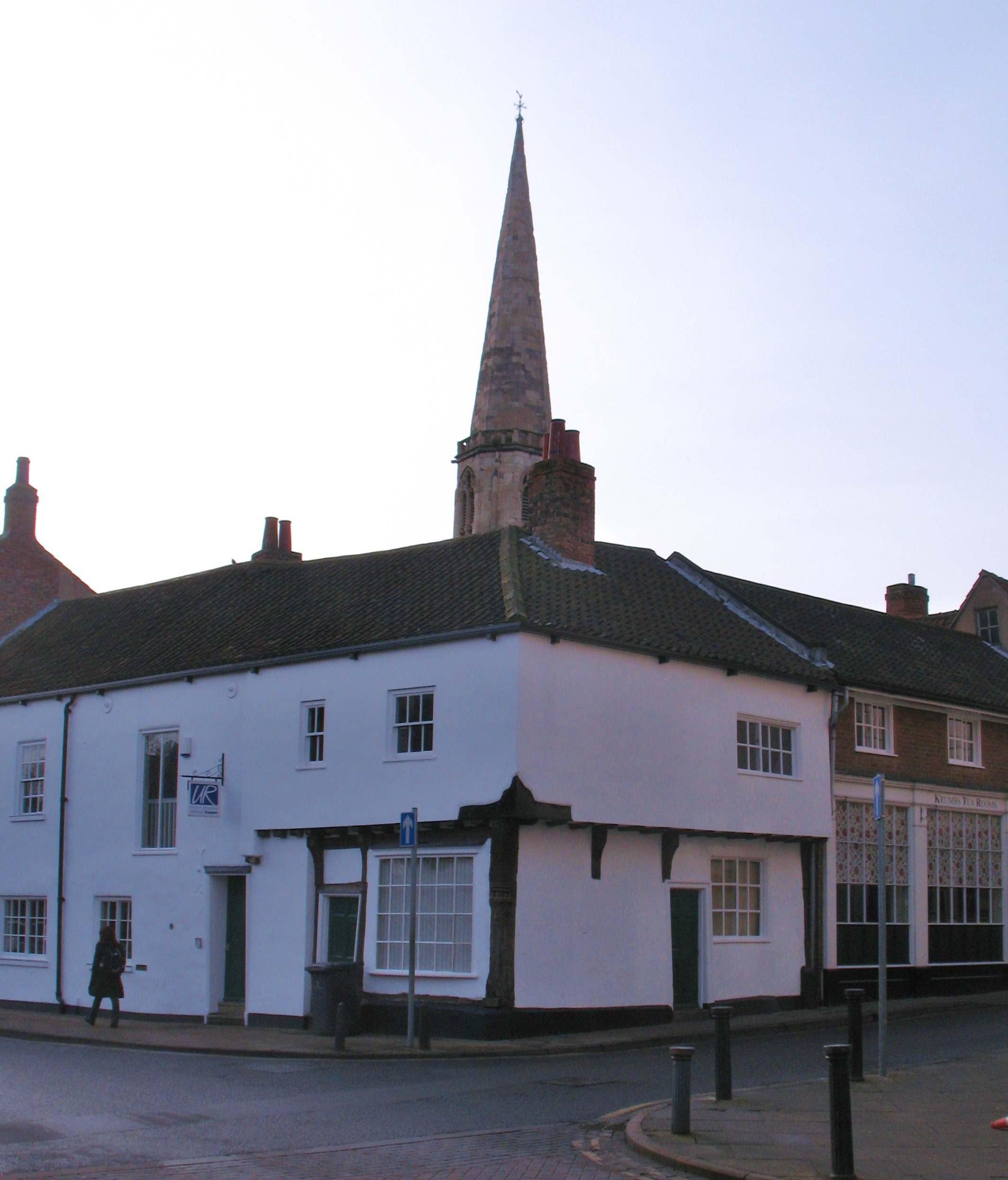
- The building in 2016
- Interactive map of the 39 North Street and 1 Tanner Row area

General information
- Location: North Street and Tanner Row, York, England
- Coordinates: 53°57′32″N 1°05′11″W
- Year built: Late 15th century
- Renovated: 18th century, c. 1900, 1991

Technical details
- Material: Timber framed
- Floor count: 2

Design and construction
- Designations

Listed Building – Grade II*
- Official name: 39, North Street, 1, Tanner Row
- Designated: 19 August 1971
- Reference no.: 1257066

39 North Street and 1 Tanner Row form a single historic building in the city centre of York, England. Originally constructed in the late 15th century as a Wealden hall house, a form common in South East England, but rare in York, it is one of the two northernmost surviving examples of the type, alongside the Wealden Hall on Goodramgate. As built, it had a large open hall, with a two-storey block on the east and another to the west which could not be accessed from the hall.

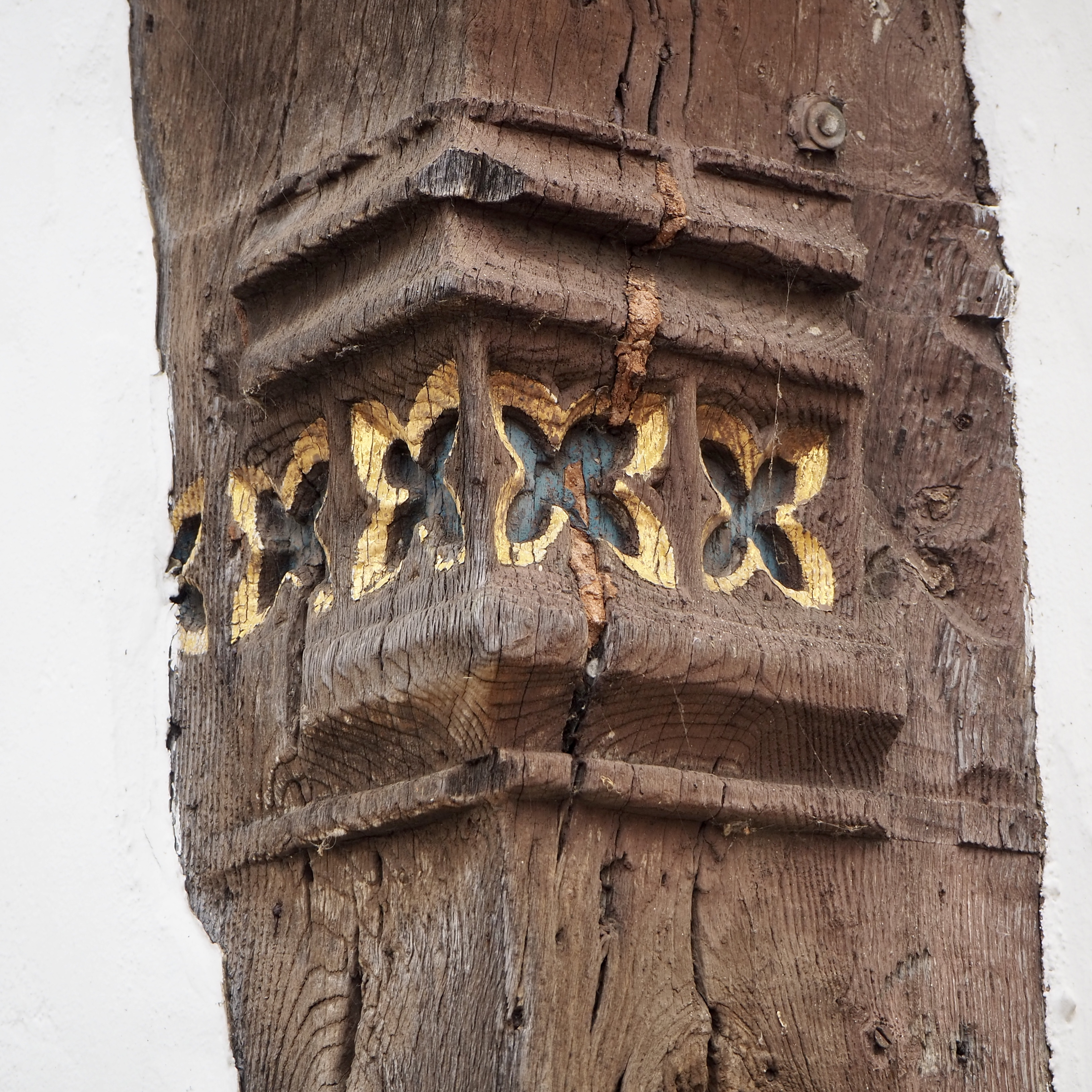
Decoration on the corner post

In the 17th century, the hall and the east block were divided to form two tenements. As part of the conversion, a floor was inserted to divide the hall vertically, and the front was extended to jetty out, matching the east and west blocks. A central chimney and two staircases were also added. The building was refronted in the 18th century. In the late 19th century, the west block became vacant, and it was demolished in 1929. Around this time, the roof of the remaining structure was replaced. Although it became vacant in the mid-20th century, it was restored in the early 1970s, and again in 1991, for use as offices. In 1971, it was Grade II* listed.

The building is timber-framed and now entirely two storeys tall. It stands on the corner of North Street and Tanner Row, with a decorated beam at the corner. The original doorway, now altered, is in the centre of the North Street facade, and to its right are a 19th-century door and large window. To the south, the building adjoins another house, and the dividing wall has been rebuilt in brick. Inside, much of the timber framing survives, as does one 17th-century staircase.

== See also ==
- Grade II* listed buildings in the City of York
- Listed buildings in York (within the city walls, southern part)
