= Tanner Row =

Street in York, England

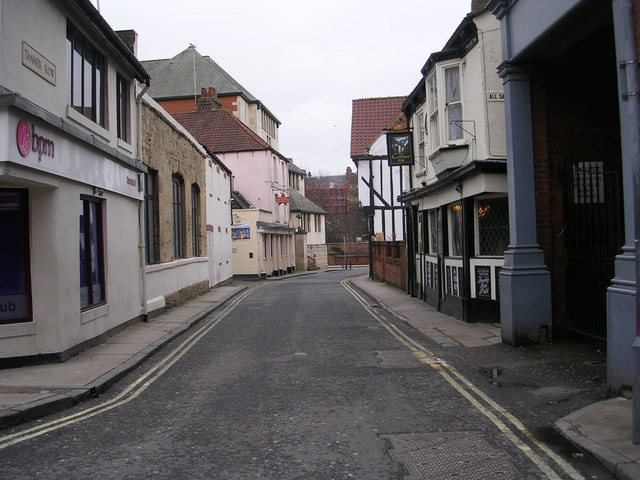
- View north-west along Tanner Row
- Location within York
- Former name: Barker Rawe
- Location: York, England
- Postal code: YO
- Coordinates: 53.9582°N 1.0878°W
- North east end: North Street; Wellington Row
- Major junctions: George Hudson Street; Rougier Street
- South west end: Toft Green; Barker Lane

Tanner Row is a street in the city centre of York, England.

== History ==
The area covered by the street formed part of the civilian settlement associated with Roman Eboracum. Archaeological investigations have uncovered remains of a bathhouse, a house, and two mosaic pavements.

The street developed in the medieval period as part of North Street, running along the backs of the plots on the north side of Micklegate. Over time it became built up with warehouses, coach houses, and stables, and an increasing number of Micklegate plots were subdivided, with new houses constructed along the street.

By the late Middle Ages the street was associated with tanners, and in 1524 it was recorded as "Barker Rawe". In 1700, Lady Hewley's Almshouses were built here, surviving until their demolition for the construction of the city's first railway station.

== Layout and architecture ==
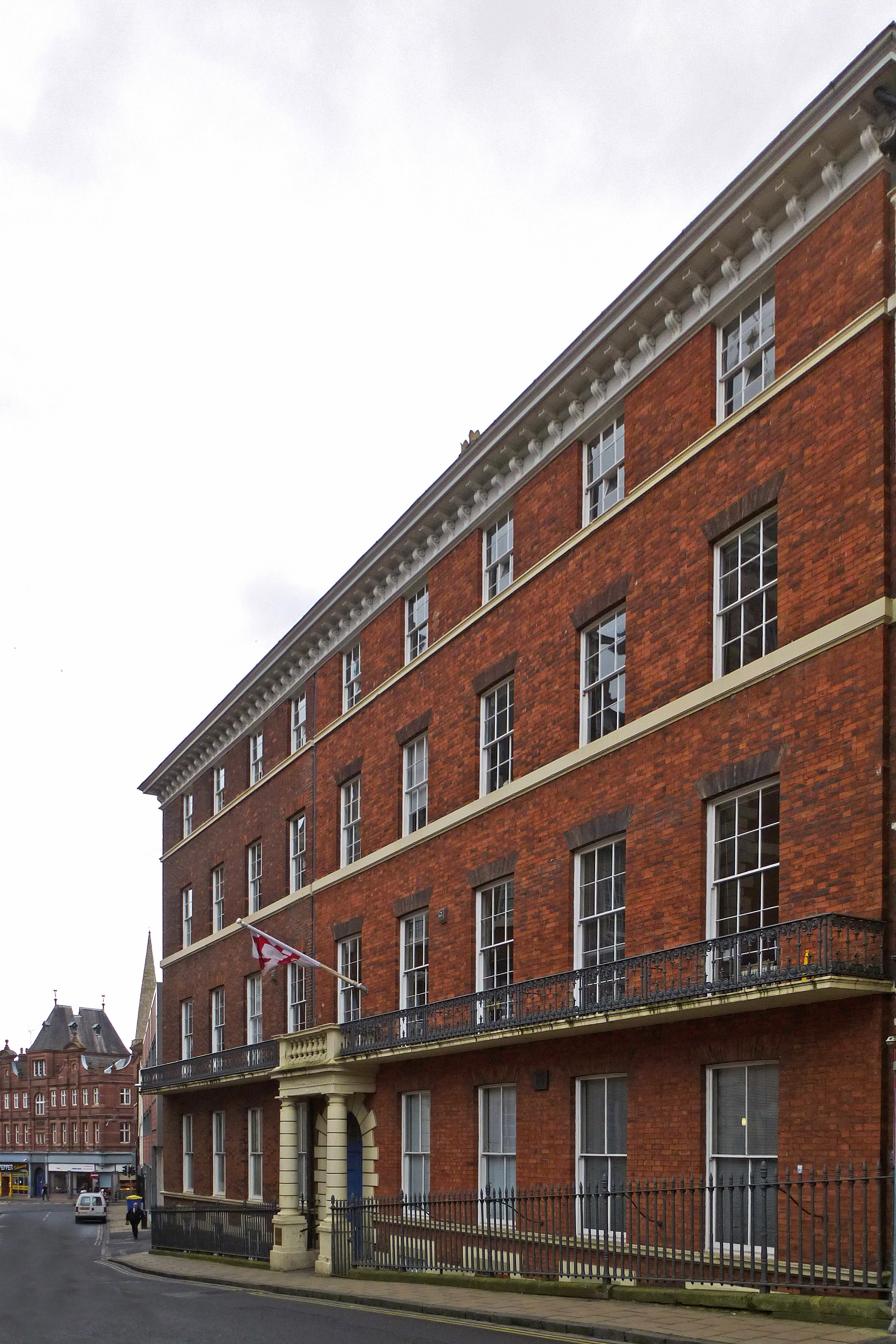
37 Tanner Row

The street runs south-west, from the junction of North Street and Wellington Row, near south bank of the River Ouse, to the junction of Toft Green and Barker Lane. Approximately halfway, it crosses the junction of George Hudson Street and Rougier Street. Station Rise leads off the north-west side of the road, as does the short Tanner Street.

Notable buildings on the south-east side of the street include the late-15th-century No. 1; the early-18th-century No. 7; The Old Rectory at No. 7A, possibly built as a warehouse around 1600; The Corner Pin pub at No. 17, built as a house in the mid-18th century; Nos. 19 and 21, built in 1899 for the York Equitable Industrial Society; No. 37 from around 1850; and No. 39 and No. 43, both built about 1845 to 1850.

On the north side lie the side elevation of the Aviva Building; the former York railway station, now the headquarters of the City of York Council; and the Grand Hotel and Spa.
