= 39 Tanner Row =

Listed former pub in York, England

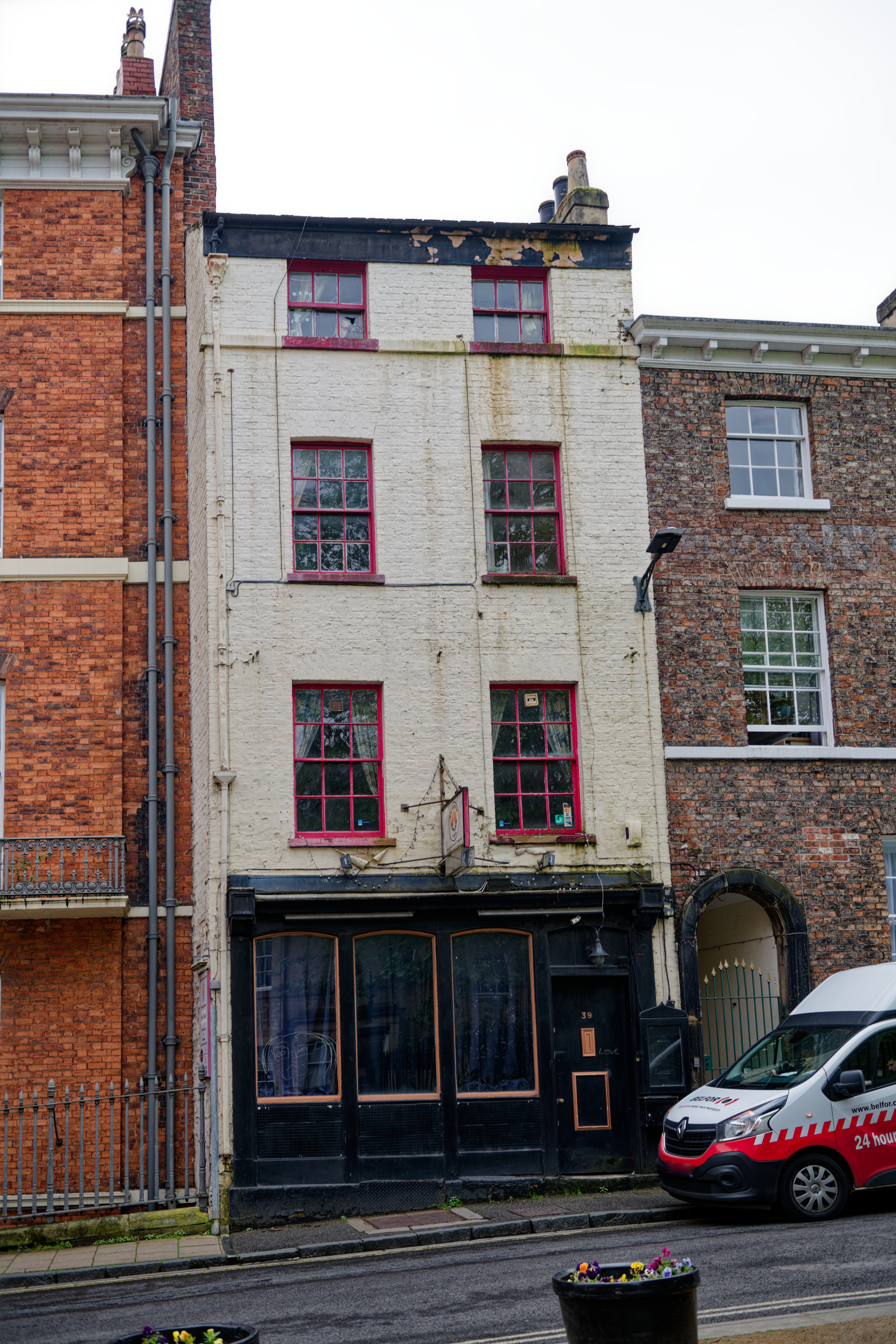
- The building in 2024
- Interactive map of the 39 Tanner Row area
- Former names: North Eastern Refreshment Rooms; The Refreshment; The Grapes; Grapes Commercial and Refreshment Hotel; Jeeves Restaurant; Tony's Greek Restaurant; The Mogul; Krakatoa Restaurant

General information
- Status: Vacant
- Type: Restaurant (former); originally public house
- Location: Tanner Row, York, England
- Coordinates: 53.9579°N 1.0886°W
- Year built: 1840–1850; 176 years ago
- Closed: 1978 (as a pub); 2016 (as a restaurant)

Design and construction
- Designations

Listed Building – Grade II
- Official name: 39, Tanner Row
- Designated: 24 June 1983
- Reference no.: 1256475

39 Tanner Row is a Grade II listed former public house on Tanner Row in York, England. The building dates from about 1845 to 1850, although a 2023 heritage report suggests it may have been built shortly before 1843, as new premises intended to operate as an inn. It formed part of wider redevelopment along the street after the opening of the nearby railway station in 1841. Known variously as the Refreshment Inn, the North Eastern Refreshment Rooms and, by the mid‑1870s, The Grapes, it remained in use as a pub and small hotel into the 20th century before closing in 1978. It later housed several restaurants, including the Indonesian restaurant Krakatoa from 2013 to 2016. In 2024 planning permission was granted for alterations to create restaurant space on the ground floor and holiday accommodation above.

== History ==
The building is a former public house on Tanner Row. According to its official listing, it dates from between 1845 to 1850, while a 2023 independent heritage research report suggests it may have been built shortly before 1843 as new premises intended to operate as an inn or pub, replacing an earlier structure on the site. Its construction formed part of wider redevelopment along the street following the opening of the nearby railway station in 1841.

Before around 1900, No. 39 appeared in directories under several different numbers, including 15, 16 and 15½. The first definite reference to No. 39 itself comes in 1849, when it is listed as the Refreshment Inn under George Dawson at No.15½. Dawson also appears in an 1843 directory as running the Railway Coffee House opposite the station on Tanner Row. This may suggest that No. 39 was already built by 1843, slightly earlier than the date given in the official listing, or that Dawson operated a different business nearby before taking on newly built premises at No. 39. In the absence of firm evidence, the exact sequence remains uncertain.

The 1851 census records No. 15, then occupied by Hannah Dawson, a widowed innkeeper, along with several relatives, servants and waiters. By 1858 the property was listed as the North Eastern Refreshment Rooms under Elizabeth Young, and in 1861 it appeared as the Refreshment Inn, again run by Young, with a large household that included family members, staff and lodgers.

By the mid‑1870s the premises were already known as The Grapes. Other pubs in York used the same name, including ones on Petergate and King Street. In June 1880 the Grapes Refreshment Inn, opposite the old station gates and then held by J. S. Smith, was advertised to let. Street directories, however, continued to list the property as the North Eastern Refreshment Inn until 1876.

By 1881 a large household of staff and residents was recorded at the premises, then run by Charles Blackstone, who advertised it as the Grapes Commercial and Refreshment Hotel. Census and directory entries show the property continuing as The Grapes through the late 19th and early 20th centuries under various publicans. A photograph from around 1906 depicts the building with its four‑storey frontage, timber ground‑floor screen and prominent inn sign. The pub remained in operation into the mid‑20th century, with several changes of licensee, and by the 1970s it was a Bass house displaying a relocated bunch‑of‑grapes sign. It closed as a pub in 1978 and subsequently became Jeeves Restaurant, later operating as Tony's Greek Restaurant by the late 1980s.

In 1968 the site was included within the newly established Central Historic Core conservation area, and on 24 June 1983, the building was designated a Grade II listed structure. It stands between No. 37 and No. 43, both also listed at Grade II.

The building was home to the Indonesian restaurant Krakatoa from spring 2013 until its closure in November 2016. It had previously operated as The Mogul curry house, which was in operation by 2003, although its opening date is not recorded. In June 2024, it was reported that an application had been submitted to City of York Council proposing an enlarged ground floor to provide restaurant seating, toilets and a kitchen, with holiday accommodation on the upper floors. The interior had been affected by damp ingress, resulting in extensive mould growth and earlier unsympathetic alterations. Approval was granted in December 2024.

== Architecture ==
The building is a four‑storey painted‑brick structure with a timber frontage at ground level on a stone base, and a slate roof with a brick chimney to the left. It was originally built with separate cellars for beer barrels and bottled drinks, and the main entrance was on the north side facing Tanner Row, with a passage along the west side giving access to the rear. This passage continued beside the rear range and was later covered by 1891. The north end of the rear range was single‑storey and may have served as a smoke room with a cellar beneath, while the remainder appears to have been two storeys, likely used for staff accommodation and possibly kitchen space; it was extended between 1852 and 1891 and may have been reduced to one storey in the early 20th century. The front elevation has two windows per floor, with a timber ground‑floor screen of three large cambered‑head windows and a four‑panel door, all beneath a prominent cornice on shaped brackets. The first and second floors contain tall 12‑pane sash windows with painted stone sills, and the top floor has shorter six‑pane sashes above a raised sill band. A rainwater hopper and round downpipe with fleur‑de‑lys brackets stand to the left. There was no stabling, though outdoor toilets may once have stood in the rear yard.

=== Interior ===
The building is arranged two rooms deep, which at ground level may originally have contained the public bar, serving area and a tap room. Inside, the original staircase survives and leads to small landings on each upper floor, where a larger front bedroom and a smaller rear bedroom were provided, all heated and likely fitted with cupboards. Very little early decorative work remains, apart from features such as tongue‑and‑groove panelling in the stair hall, and most rooms retain their original fireplaces and some built‑in furniture, although only the first‑floor front room preserves a full set of early finishes. Many of the original sash windows also survive, though most are now in poor condition. During the 20th century the front bedrooms were partly divided and modern bathrooms were added to some of the rear rooms.

== See also ==
- Listed buildings in York (within the city walls, southern part)
