= Emma Raughton =

15th-century British anchoress

Emma Raughton or Emma Rawghton (fl. 1422–1436) was an early 15th-century British anchoress. From the anchorhold at All Saints' Church, North Street, York, Emma received visions of the Blessed Virgin Mary. She was consulted by Richard de Beauchamp, 13th Earl of Warwick, about both his desire for a male heir, and in political matters, his role in supporting the young King Henry VI.

Her life and works were recorded by the historian John Rous.
