= Aviva Building =

Office building in York, England

- The building in 2023
- Interactive map of the Aviva Building area

General information
- Type: Offices
- Location: Wellington Row, York, England
- Coordinates: 53.9592°N 1.0871°W
- Current tenants: Aviva
- Completed: 1993

Technical details
- Material: Magnesian Limestone, brick
- Floor count: 4–6

Design and construction
- Architect: Brian Paul
- Architecture firm: Hurd Rolland Partnership

The Aviva Building is an office building in the city centre of York, in England.

The building lies by the River Ouse, on a prominent site in the centre of the historic city. It was designed by the Hurd Rolland Partnership, led by Brian Paul. Paul initially proposed a modern building, based around "tumble down masonry cubes" which would create a traditional skyline. The York Civic Trust successfully argued for a more traditional design, including gables and windows with mullions and transoms.

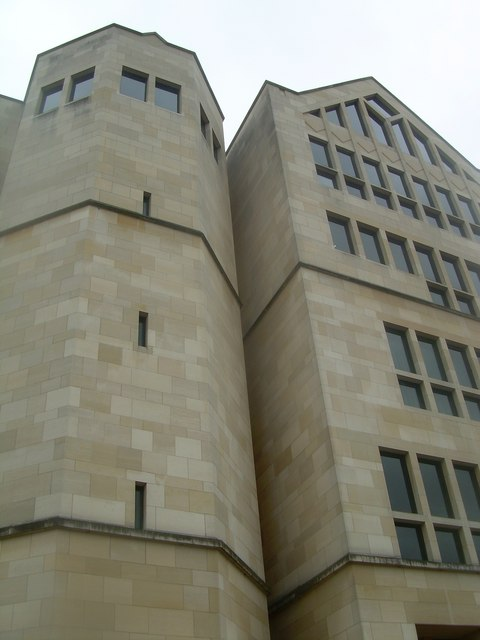
The octagonal tower, from Wellington Row

The building is six storeys in height along the river, and four storeys along Tanner Row. It has an octagonal tower. The river and Tanner's Moat facades are faced in Magnesian Limestone, and John Brooke Fieldhouse describes it as the city's only post-World War II building to be faced largely with quarried stone. The Tanner Row and rear facades are of brick. The ground floor is rusticated, and there are string courses at the first and third-floor levels. At the rear, there is a rooftop car park.

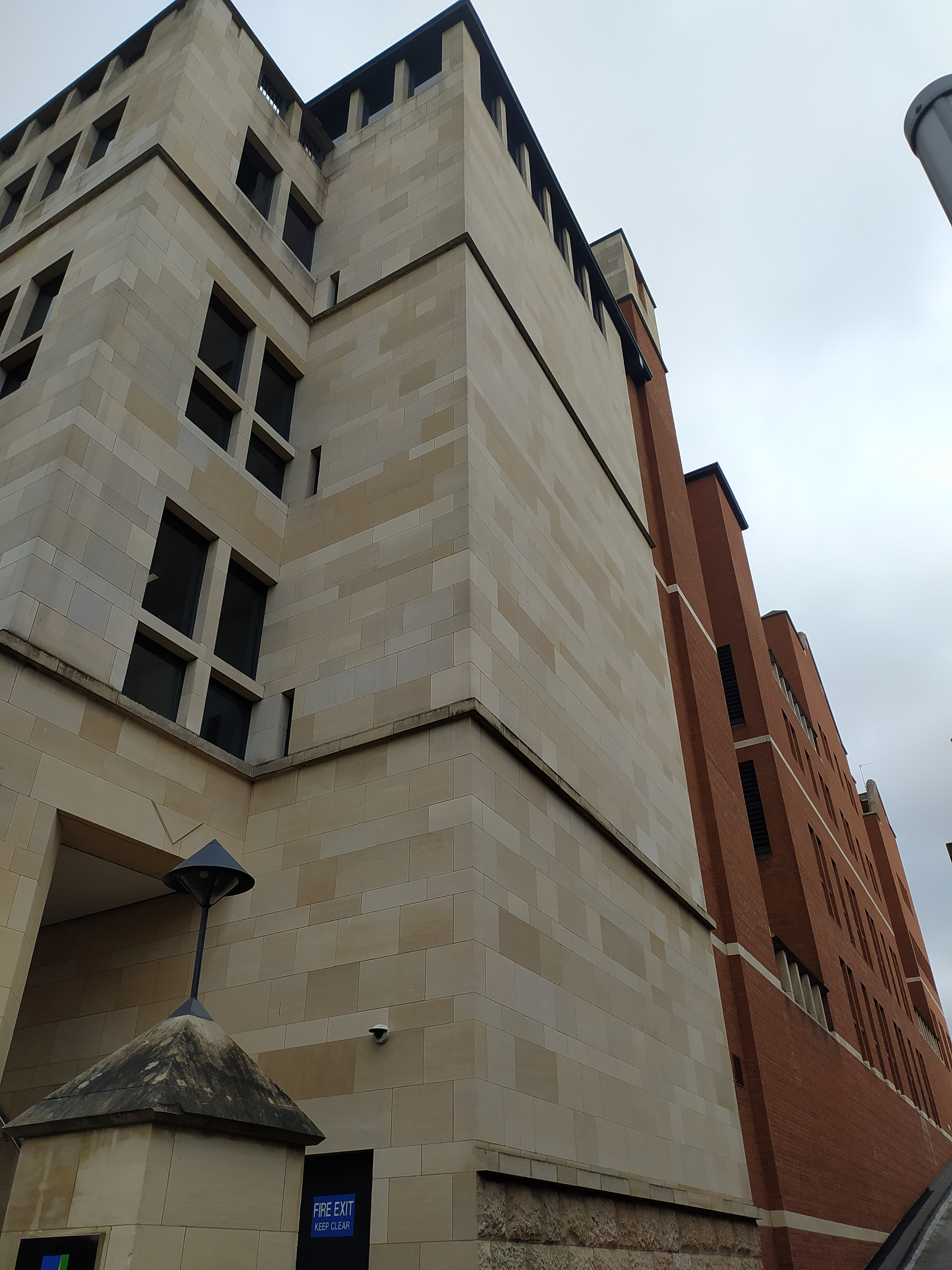
Rear view of the building, showing some brickwork

The building was completed in 1993. Patrick Nuttgens wrote approvingly of the design as fitting in with the city's heritage, but Peter Davey writing in the Architectural Review criticised its facadism.

The building originally housed the regional headquarters of the General Accident insurance company. Following a series of mergers, it became the headquarters of Aviva. In 2018, the stonework was cleaned.
