= John Rous (historian) =

English historian and antiquary (died 1492)

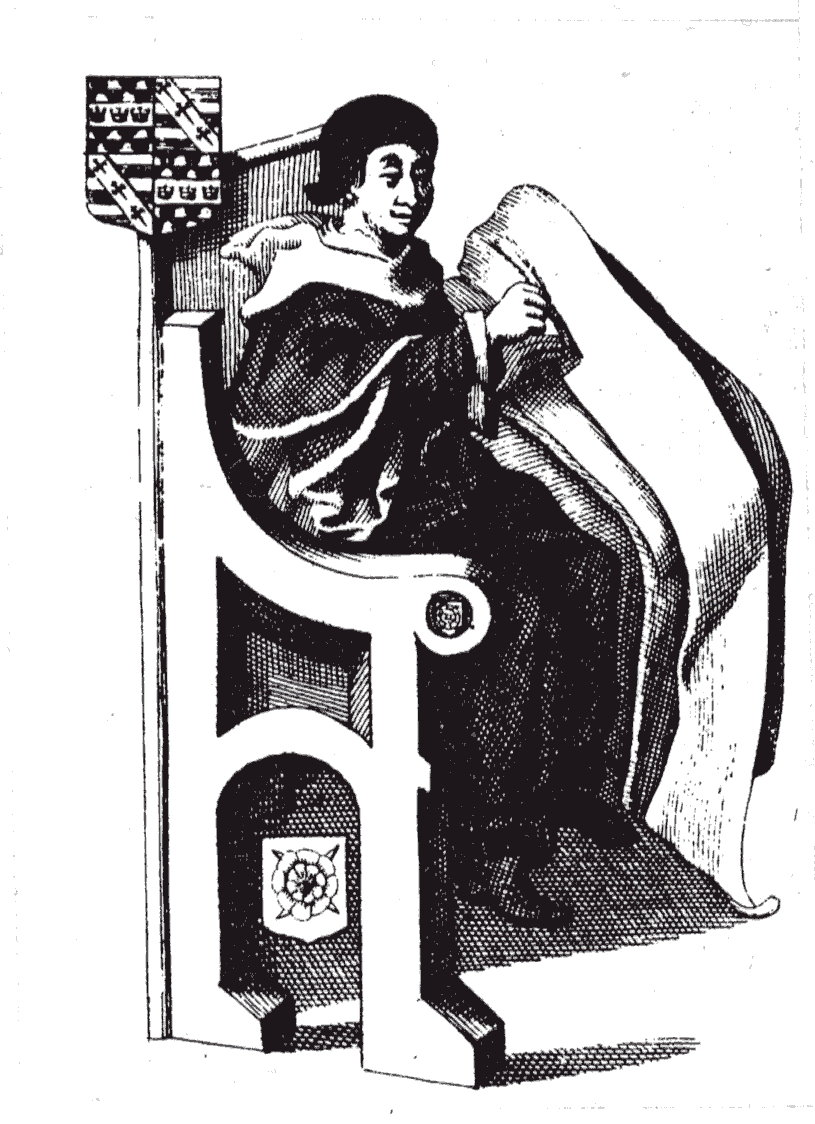
John Rous, as depicted in the Rous Roll (1845 engraving after the original)

John Rous (c. 1411/20 – 24 January 1492) was an English historian and antiquary, most noted for his Historia Regum Angliae ("History of the Kings of England"), which describes ancient British and English rulers from Brutus to King Henry VII. His historical work is now considered to have "displayed no critical faculty" and to have made credulous the "imaginative embellishments (of) the myths of Geoffrey of Monmouth." However his Rous Roll and Warwick Roll are noted for their historically important illustrations, often credited to Rous's hand but not with certainty.

== Origins ==
Rous was born at Warwick, probably in 1420, though this is uncertain. He was the son of Geoffrey Rous of Warwick, a younger son of Thomas Rous of Brinklow, by his wife Margaret Fyncham, a daughter of Richard Fyncham, both of armigerous gentry families.

== Career ==
He was educated at Oxford University. He entered holy orders, remaining in the vicinity of Warwick for most of his clerical career but making some travels to study archives for his historical research. He spent most of his career in the service of the Yorkist dynasty. He was chaplain of the chapel of Guy's Cliffe during the reign of King Richard III (1483-1485) and was a canon of the Collegiate Church of St Mary, Warwick.

== Works ==
=== Rous Roll ===
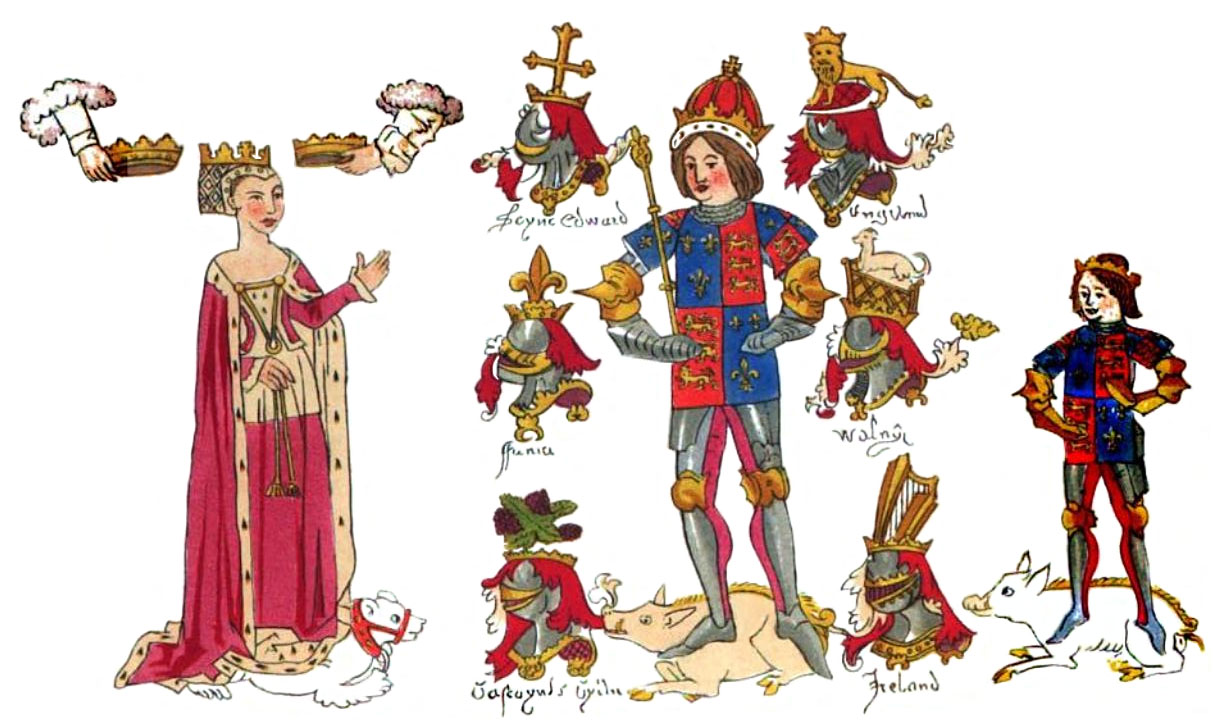
Depiction of King Richard III and his family in the Rous Roll, showing his various heraldic crests and his white boar badge, with the Warwick bear of his wife

He was responsible for creating the "Rous Roll", written during the reign of Richard III (1483–1485), which presents a pro-Yorkist version of contemporary English history. In it he praises Richard as a "good lord" who punished "oppressors of the commons". However, he reversed his position dramatically in his later Historia Regum Angliae written in the following reign under Henry VII (1485–1509), Richard's deposer, in which he portrays Richard as a freakish individual born with fully-formed teeth and shoulder-length hair after having been in his mother's womb for two years, and as an adult with a stunted and distorted body with one shoulder higher than the other. In the later work Rous also attributes the 1471 murder of King Henry VI to Richard, and claims that he poisoned his own wife. The Rous Roll also contains details of the prophesies of the anchoress Emma Raughton, who lived until 1436.

=== Warwick Roll ===
The "Warwick Roll" is a family chronicle of the Beauchamp family, concerned mainly with the life of Richard Beauchamp, 13th Earl of Warwick (1382–1439).

=== Historia Regum Angliae ===
In his Historia Regum Angliae ("History of the Kings of England") Rous was mainly interested in antiquarian details of social life and the development of scholarly institutions. For example in his life of King Henry V (1413–1422) Rous describes that king's educational history and his social projects but omits to mention the Battle of Agincourt, the central event in his reign, merely noting that he "campaigned in France" and was "renowned for his military skills".

=== Other works ===
Rous appears to have written a number of other works about Warwickshire local history and histories of the Universities of Oxford and Cambridge. He also wrote a treatise on giants whom he supposed lived after the Great Flood, but most of these works are now lost.

== Death ==
He died on 24 January 1492, aged 81 according to some sources, and was buried in the Collegiate Church of St Mary, Warwick, to which he bequeathed his library, directing that a special room to house it be built.
