= North Street (York) =

Street in York, England

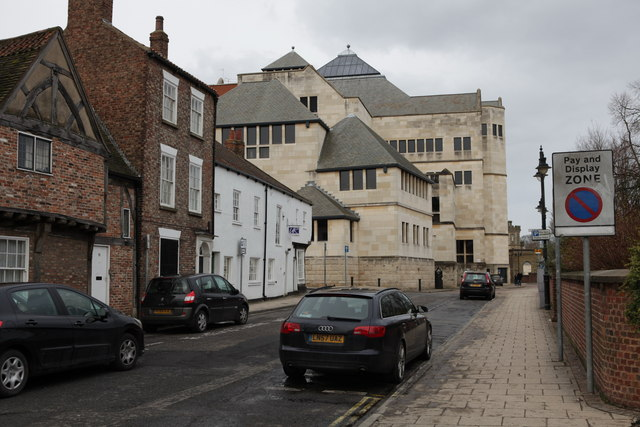
- Northern end of North Street, looking north
- Location within York
- Location: York, England
- Postal code: YO
- Coordinates: 53.9582°N 1.0855°W
- North end: Tanner Row; Wellington Row
- South end: Micklegate; Skeldergate; Bridge Street

North Street is a road in the city centre of York, England.

== History ==
The area of North Street lay within the civilian settlement of Roman Eboracum. A 2nd-century retaining river wall has been excavated, and evidence of craft working from the 9th to the 11th centuries has also been found.

The road was first recorded in about 1090 as Nordstreta, and by the 13th century this had become North Street. Starting from the southern end of Ouse Bridge, then the only bridge in the city, it ran north along the south bank of the River Ouse before turning sharply west to run parallel to Micklegate. This western section was known for its tanneries and became known as Tanner Row, now regarded as a separate street.

The remaining part of North Street developed a concentration of warehouses and riverside yards. In the early 1700s a steam flour mill was established on the street, and in 1788 a private staith was built to improve access to the river. Around this time several larger houses were constructed on the west side, including that of the architect Peter Atkinson in 1776. The street later became known for its builders' merchants, the most important being William Stead, founded in 1802. By the early 20th century it had become a mixed residential and shopping street.

Lying next to the river, the street has frequently suffered flooding. The first recorded flood occurred in 1263, and the most recent serious flood was in 1931. Regular flooding, combined with the nature of local industry, made the street an undesirable place to live, and by the early 19th century it had become one of the poorest in the city.

By the 1960s the street remained rundown. Most of the buildings on the riverside were demolished, some dating back to the 17th century, and replaced by the Viking Hotel and a riverside walk. Several historic buildings on the opposite side of the street were restored.

== Layout and architecture ==
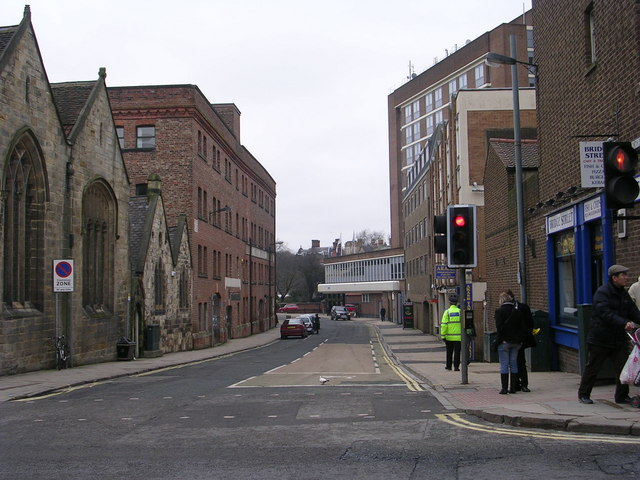
View up North Street, from Micklegate

The road runs north from the junction of Micklegate, Skeldergate and Bridge Street. At first it is separated from the river by mostly modern buildings, then by the North Street Gardens, which contain a memorial to John Snow, who was born in a house on the street.

Notable buildings on the inland side of the street include Mill House, a former grain mill now serving as the headquarters of the police in York; the former Yorkshire Hussar pub at No. 15, now the Whippet Inn steakhouse; the Grade I-listed All Saints' Church; the gable end of Church Cottages, a terrace from the late 15th century; No. 33, built around 1850; Nos. 35–37, thought to date from the late 18th and early 19th centuries; and the late-15th-century No. 39, co-listed with 1 Tanner Row.

Next to the church once stood a small building, constructed in 1900, which was sometimes described as the smallest house in England. In reality it was built as a store and was never used as a dwelling.

The street ends at the junction with Tanner Row, and its continuation is named Wellington Row. This road is closely associated with North Street, to the extent that the tower where it meets the city walls has become known as "North Street Postern Tower".
