= All Saints' Church, North Street, York =

Grade I listed church in York, England

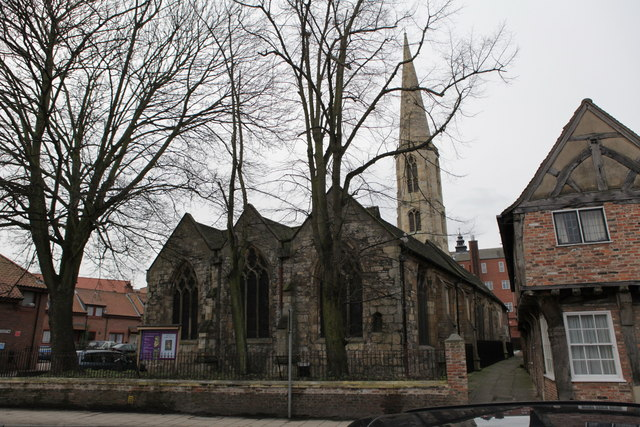
- All Saints' Church, North Street, York
- All Saints' Church, North Street, York
- 53°57′30.4″N 1°5′10.3″W
- OS grid reference: SE 60053 51758
- Location: North Street, York
- Country: England
- Denomination: Church of England
- Previous denomination: Roman Catholic
- Churchmanship: Traditional Catholic
- Website: allsaints-northstreet.org.uk

History
- Dedication: All Saints

Architecture
- Heritage designation: Grade I listed

Administration
- Province: Province of York
- Diocese: Diocese of York
- Archdeaconry: York
- Deanery: York
- Parish: All Saints, North Street, York

Clergy
- Bishop: The Rt Revd Stephen Race (AEO)

All Saints' Church is a Church of England parish church on North Street in the city of York. The church is a Grade I listed building.

== History ==
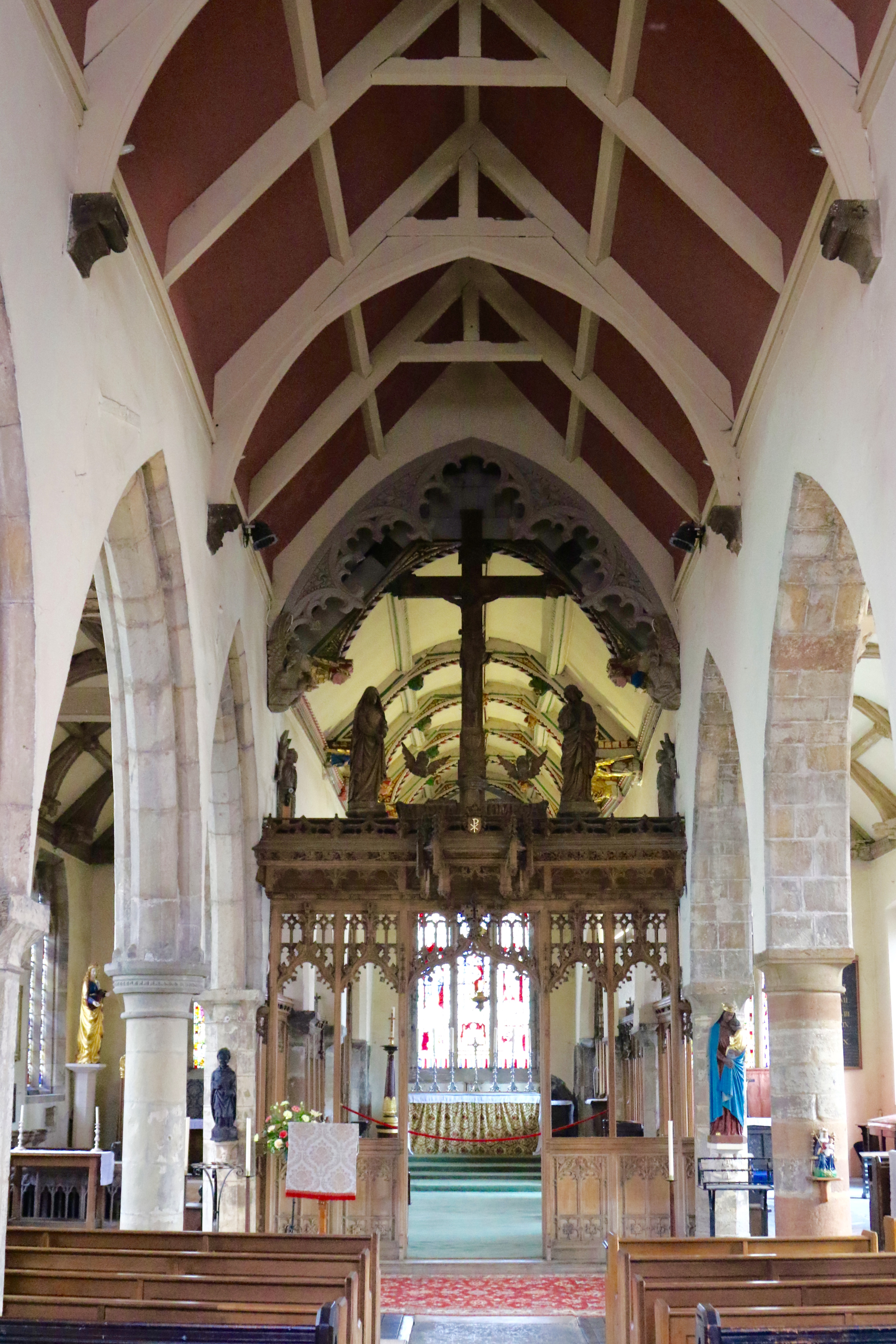
The nave and chancel

The earliest part of the church is the nave dating from the 12th century. The arcades date from the 13th century and the east end was rebuilt in the 14th century, when the chancel chapels were added.

An anchorite building was erected at the west end in the 15th century and a squint made through the wall so that Emma Raughton could observe and hear the Mass being said. This was rebuilt in 1910.

The church was restored between 1866 and 1867 by J. B. and W. Atkinson of York, which included the rebuilding of the south aisle wall, the addition of a porch and a vestry, half of the roof being replaced, new seating provided throughout, the pillars and walls scraped, and a new organ provided The masonry work was done by Mr Brumby of Skeldergate, the carpentry by Mr Dennison, the plumbing and glazing by Messrs Hodgson and the painting by Mr Lee of Gillygate. The chancel ceiling and reredos were decorated by Mr Knowles. The chancel was laid with Minton tiles. The total cost of the restoration, including the new organ, was £1,500 (equivalent to £145,200 in 2025).

The pulpit dates from 1675.

The chancel screen was installed in 1906, and designed by E. Ridsdale Tate. He also rebuilt the anchorite's house in 1910. Beginning in the early 1930s, Brother Walter Wilman inhabited the cell as anchorite and sacristan for the parish. Brother Wilman, a former clothworker and lay reader, would dwell entirely within the 8 ft × 10 ft (2.4 m × 3.0 m) room until his death some time in the 1970s, able to receive guests and observe church services while living a life of religious contemplation. The church was restored again in 1991 by the architect Peter Marshall.

== Stained glass ==
The church is noted as containing the finest collection of medieval glass in York except that of York Minster, mostly dating from the early 15th century. Perhaps the most famous is that depicting scenes from the Fifteen Signs before Doomsday accompanied by verse from the Prick of Conscience dating from about 1410.

Alongside the Prick of Conscience, another famous window is The Corporal Acts of Mercy. The window shows six of the seven corporal acts, it is not known why the seventh (burying the dead) is not shown. The window depicts the Blackburn family, who at the time were influential traders, specifically Nicholas Blackburn who at the time was Mayor of York and may have paid for the window as his family's armorials originally appeared in the lower panels.

From the north aisle, the windows are

- A set of 15th-century coats of arms
- The St Thomas window dating from c. 1430
- The Corporal Acts of Mercy dating from c. 1410
- The Prick of Conscience window dating from c. 1410
- The Lady Chapel east window dating from c. 1330
- The Chancel east window dating from c. 1410
- The south aisle east window dating from c. 1350
- The St Michael and St John window dating from c. 1430
- The Nine Orders of Angels window dating from c. 1460
- The St James window dating from c. 1410
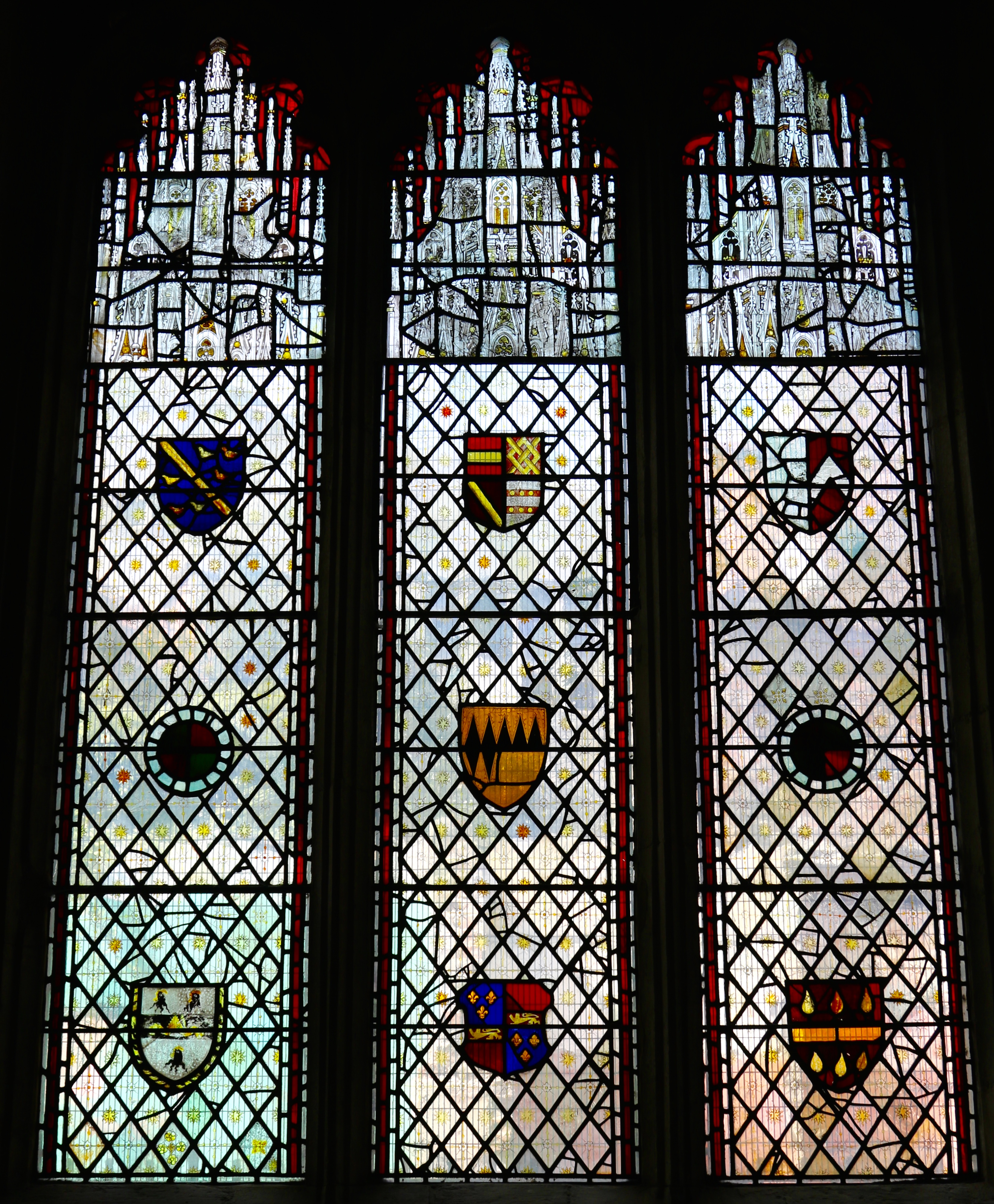
The Coats of Arms window

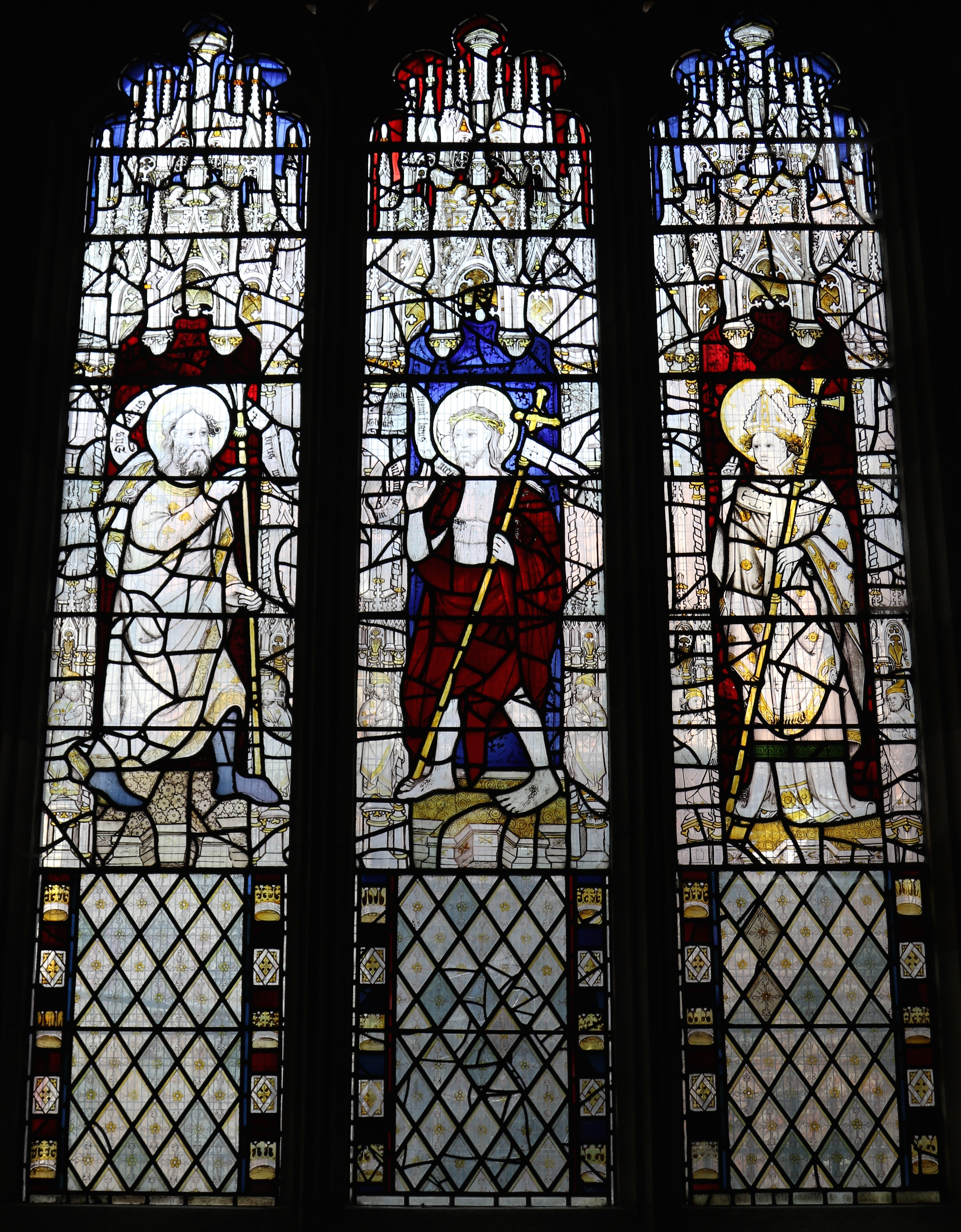
The St Thomas window

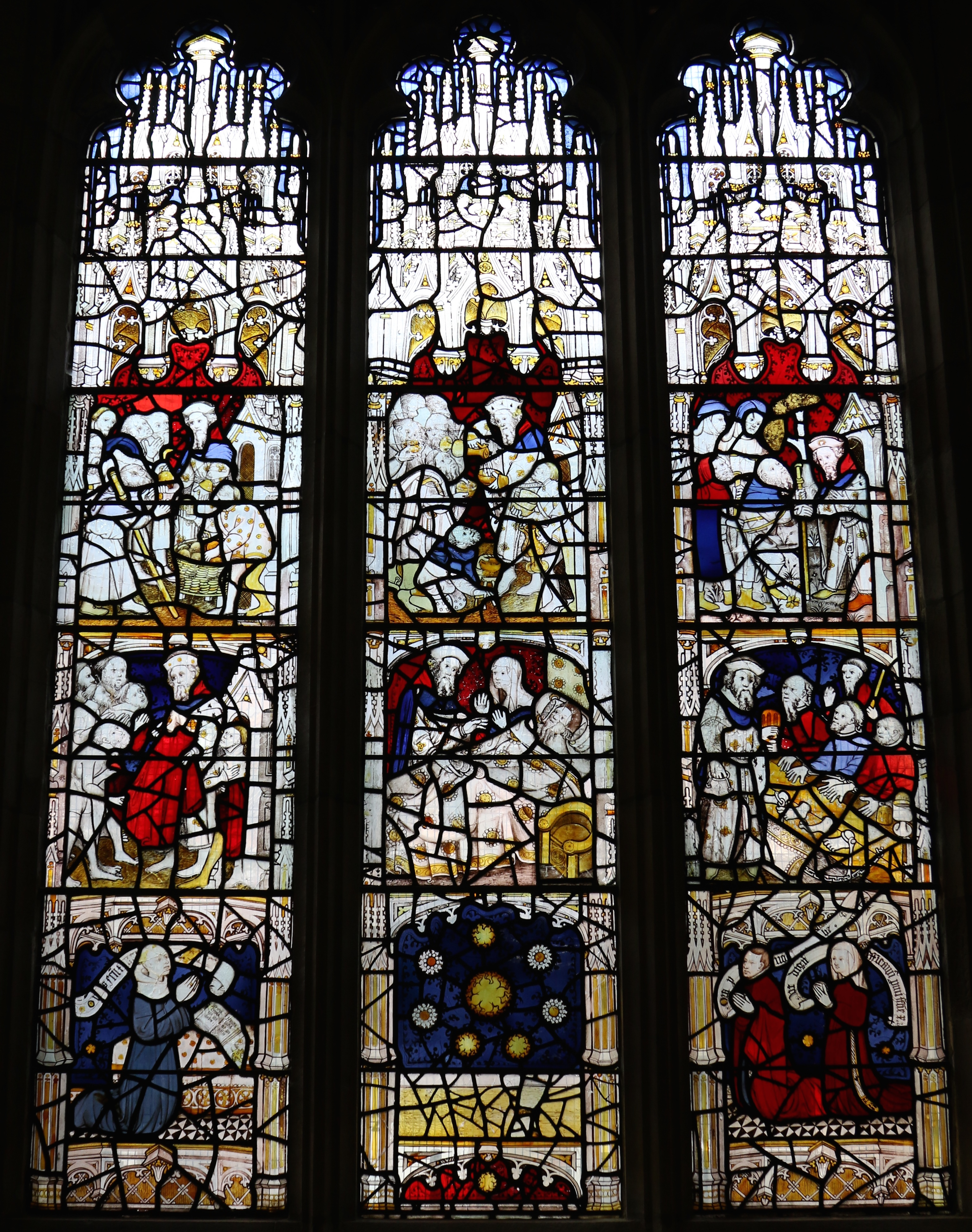
The Corporal Acts of Mercy window

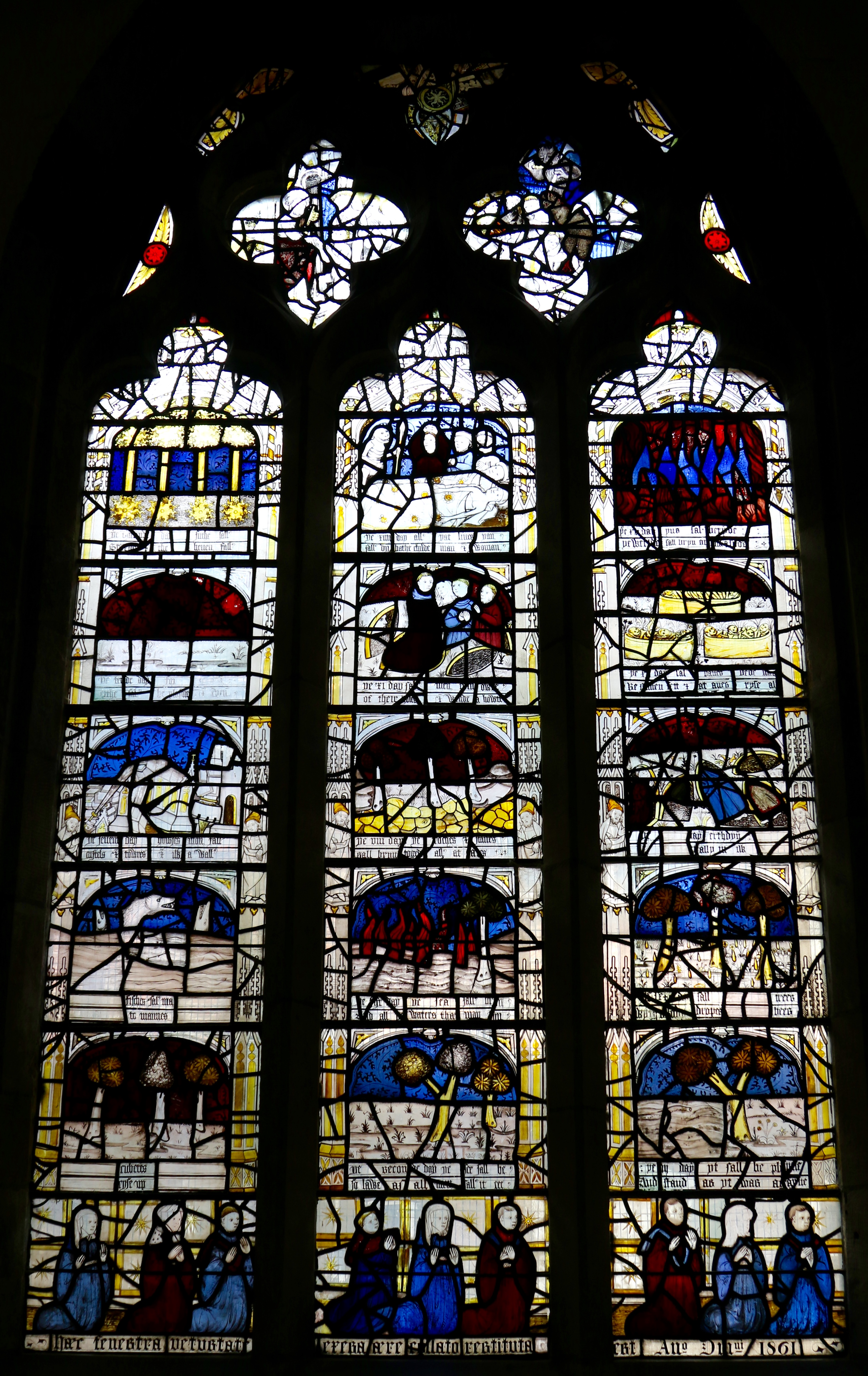
The Prick of Conscience window

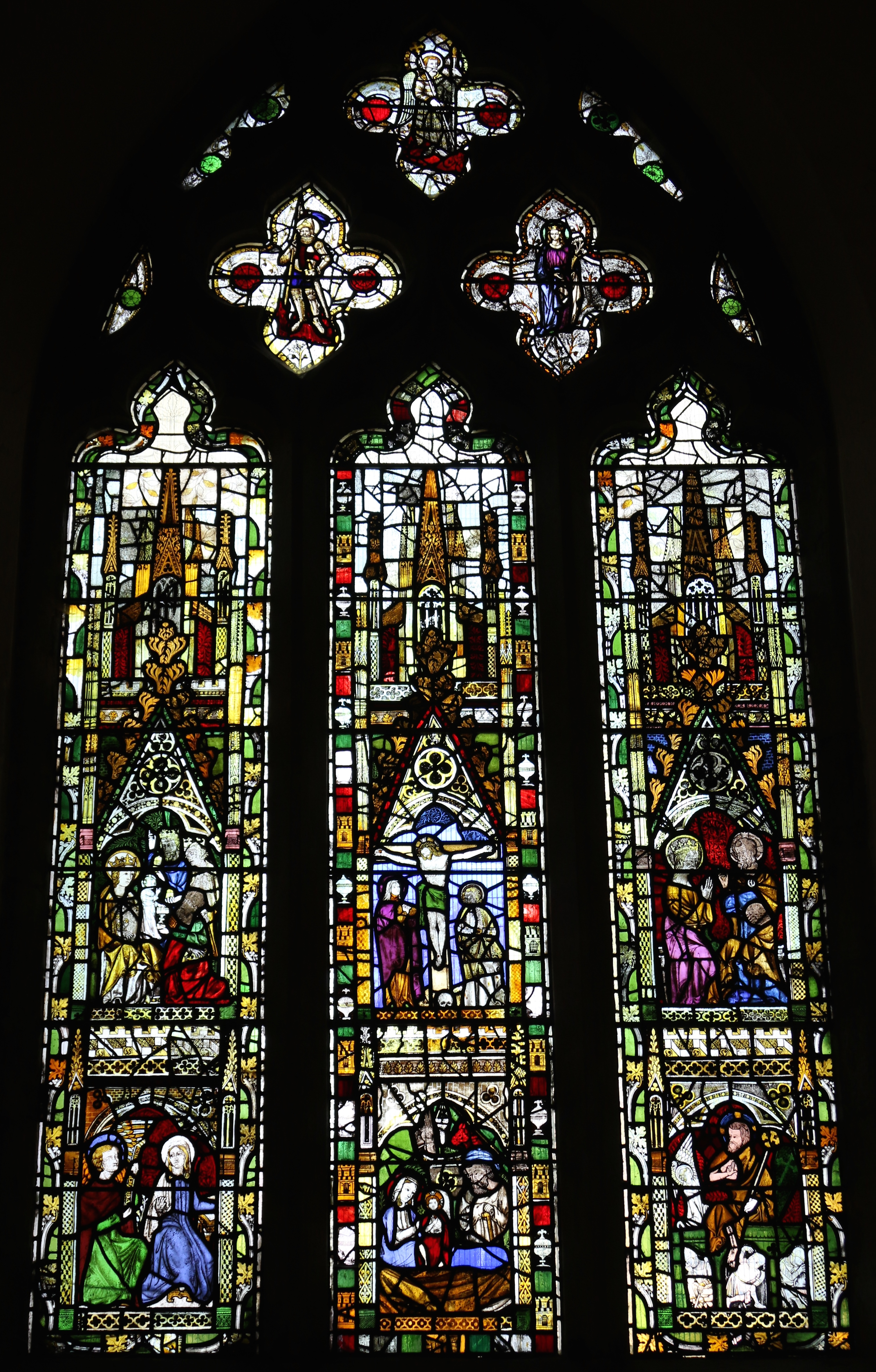
The Lady Chapel east window

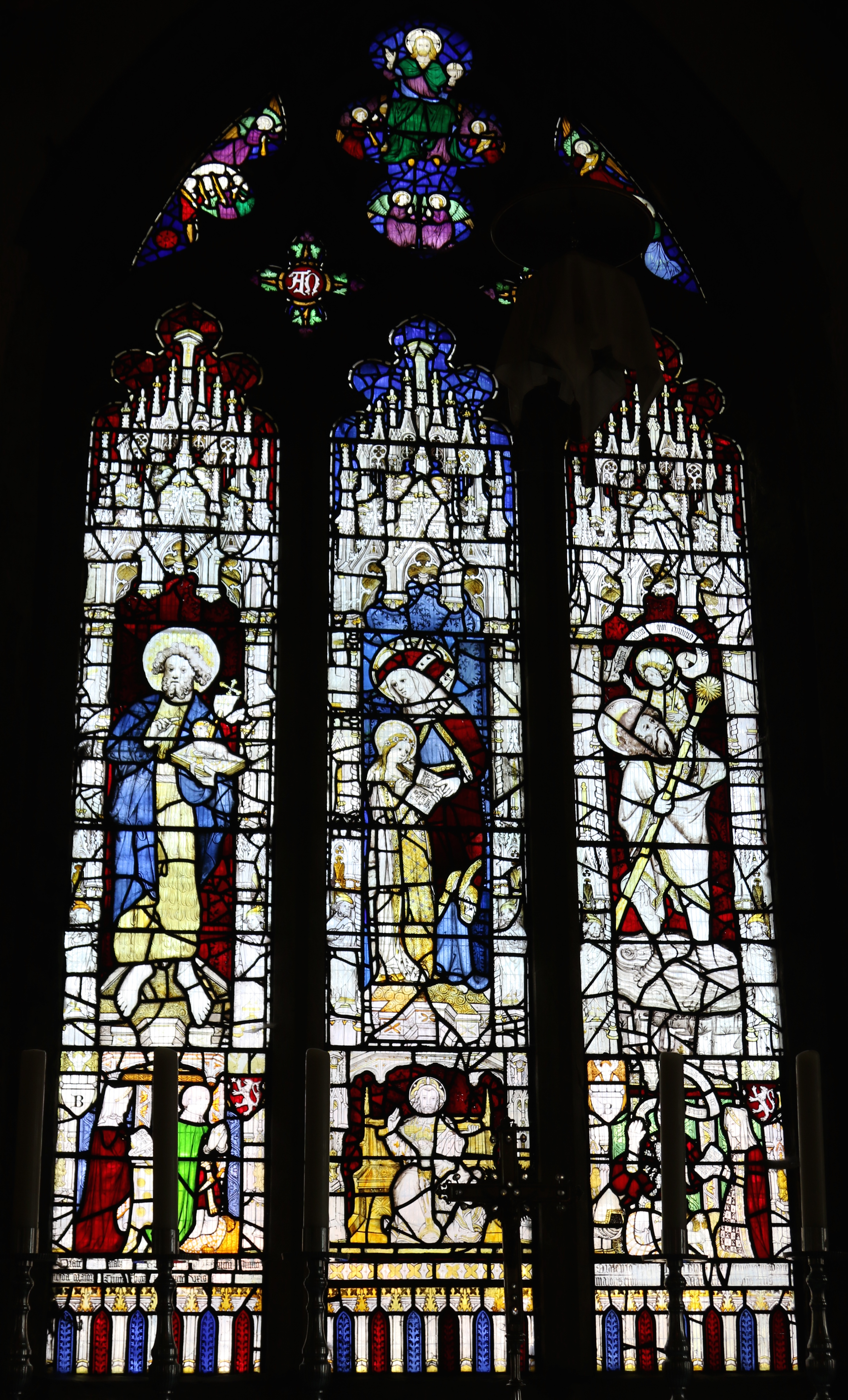
The great east window

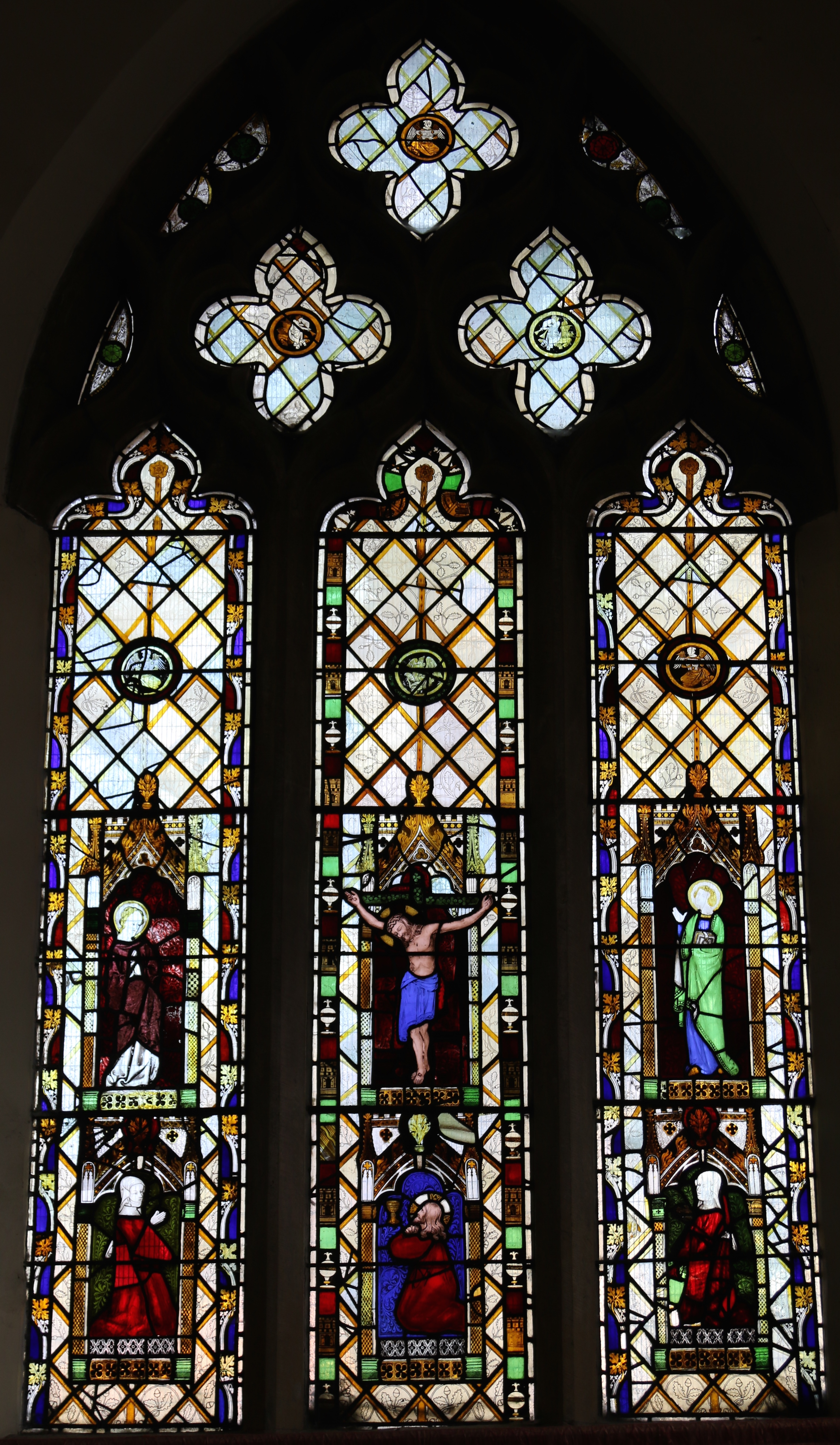
The South aisle east window

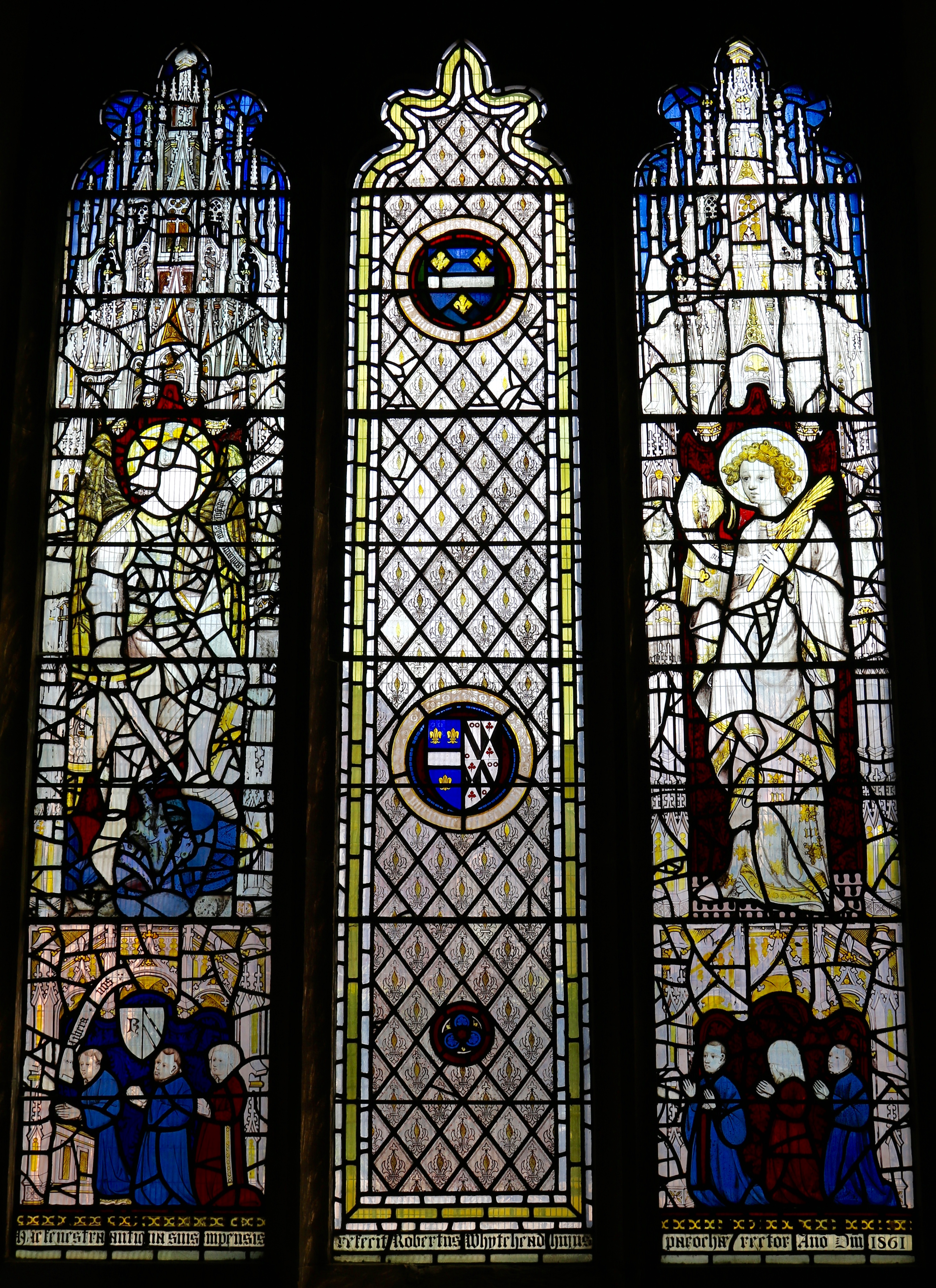
The St Michael and St John window

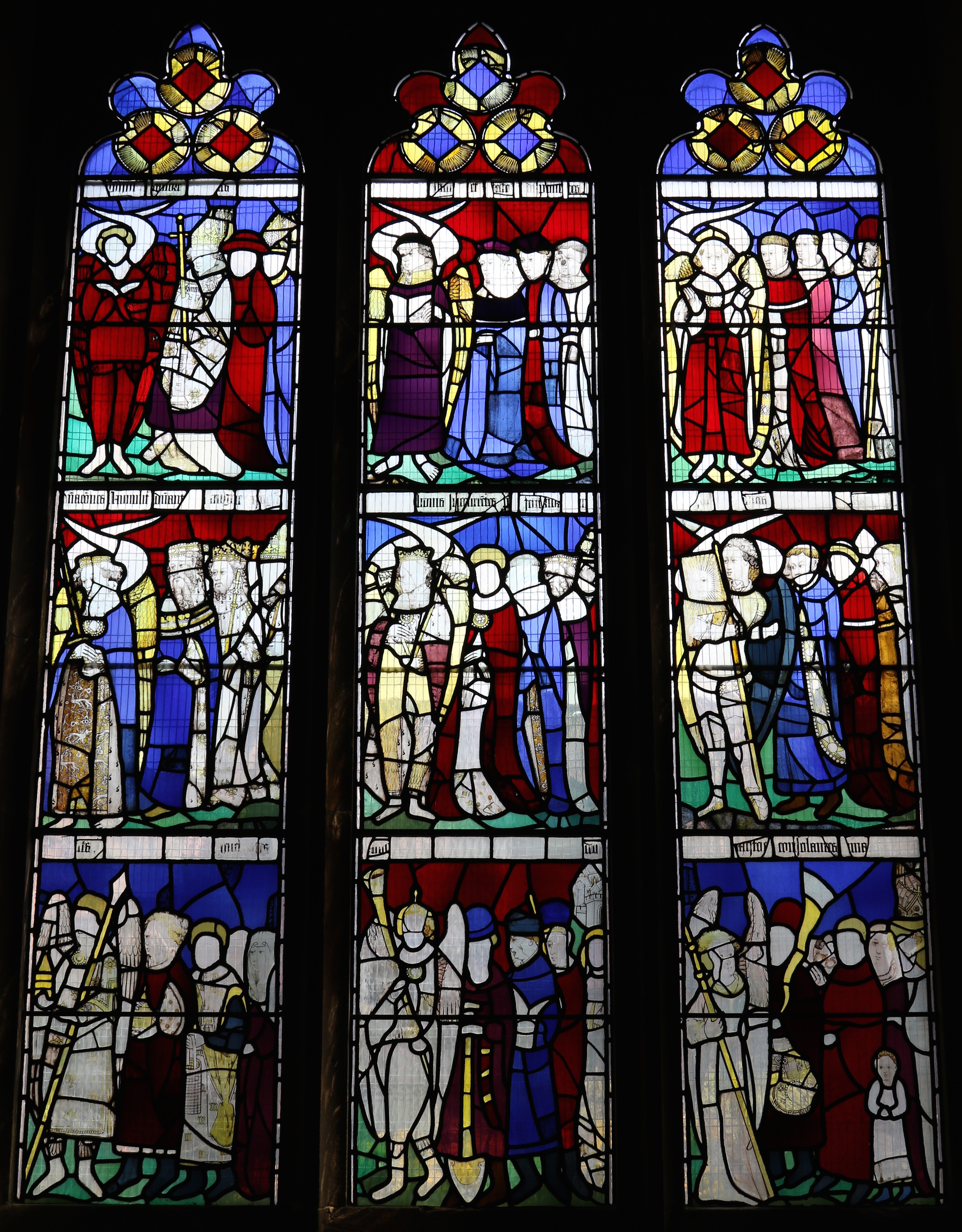
The Nine Orders of Angels window

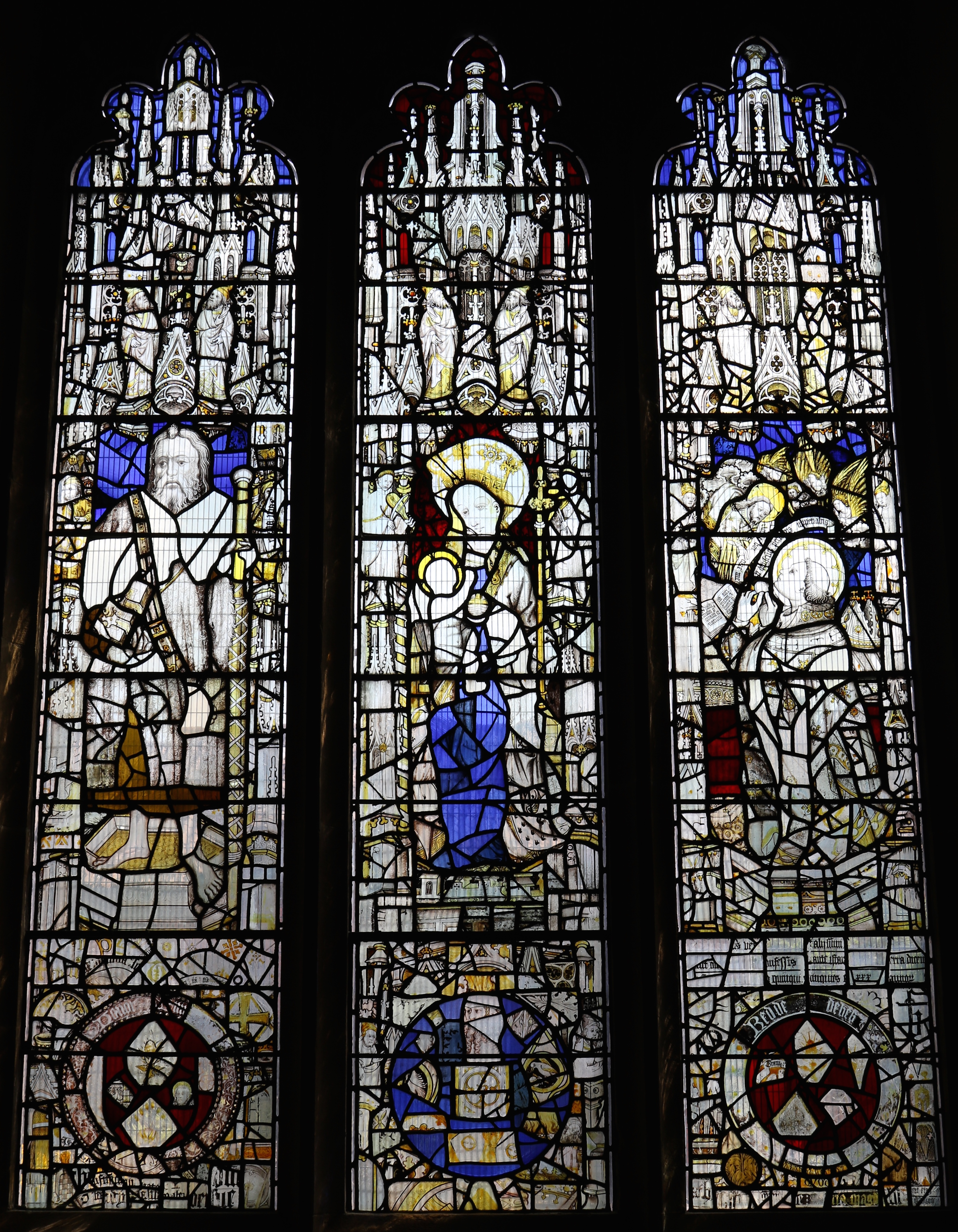
The St James' window

== Memorials ==
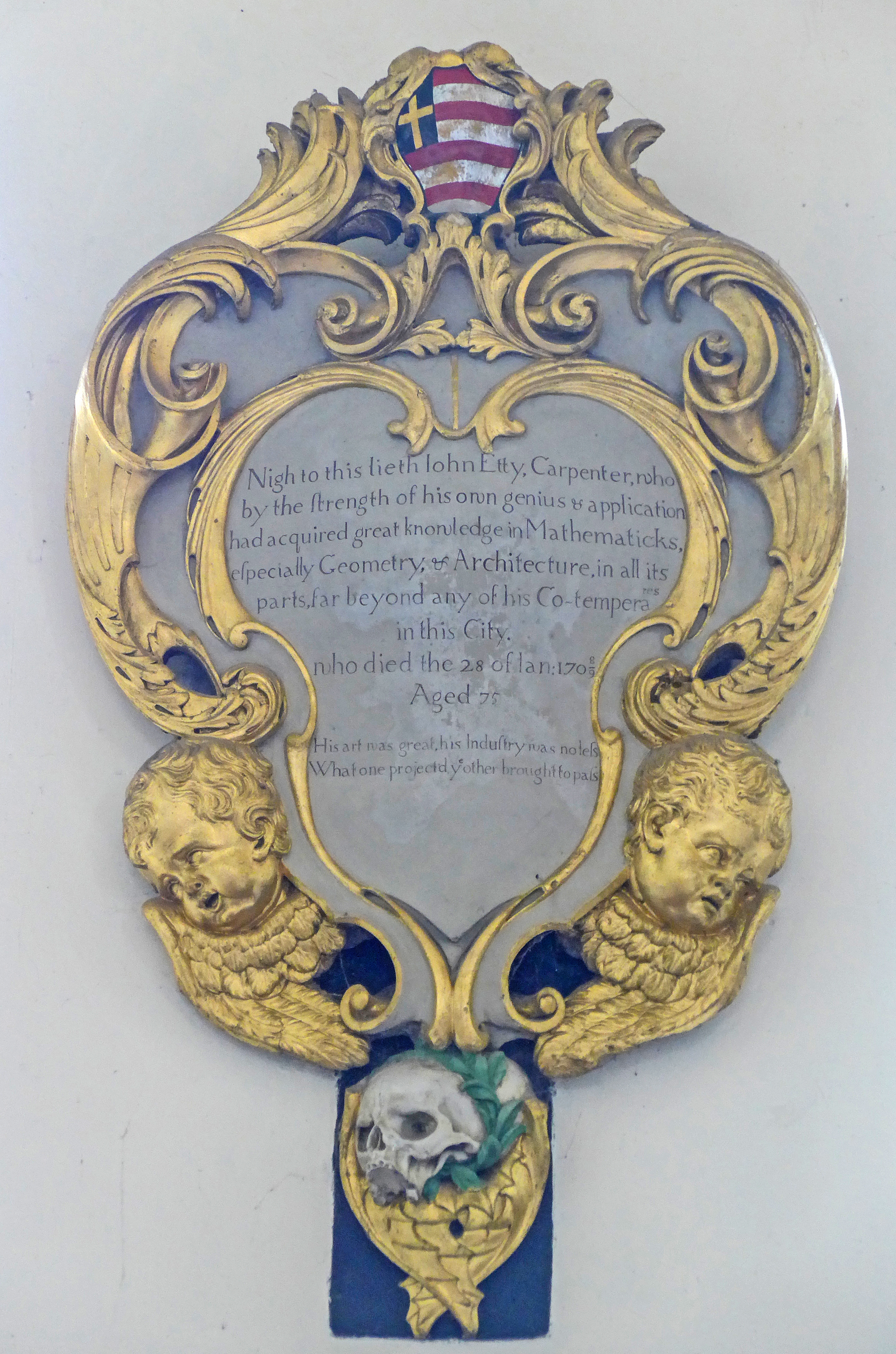
Mural memorial to John Etty (d.1709)

- John Etty (d. 1709)
- Revd. John Stoddart
- Joan Stoddart (d. 1599)
- James Pennyman (d. 1699)
- Joshua Witton (d. 1674).
- William Stockton (d. 1471)
- Robert Colynson (d. 1458)
- Thomas Clerk (d. 1482)
- Thomas Askwith (d. 1609)
- Charles Townley (d. 1712)

== Organ ==
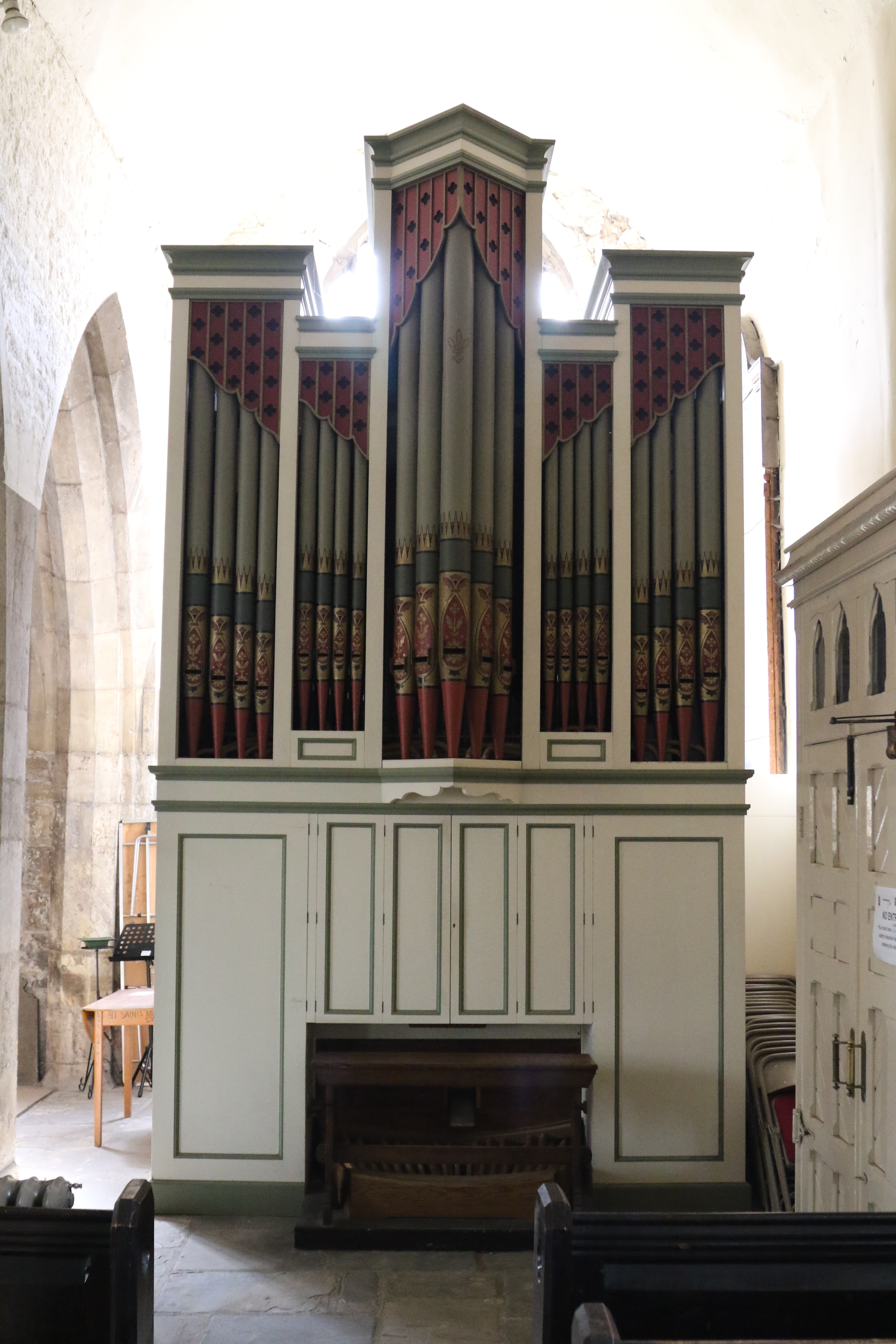
Organ by Forster and Andrews

The pipe organ was built by Forster and Andrews and dates from 1867. A specification of the organ can be found on the National Pipe Organ Register.

== See also ==
- Grade I listed buildings in the City of York
- Listed buildings in York (within the city walls, southern part)
