= 8 Fossgate =

Listed building in York, England

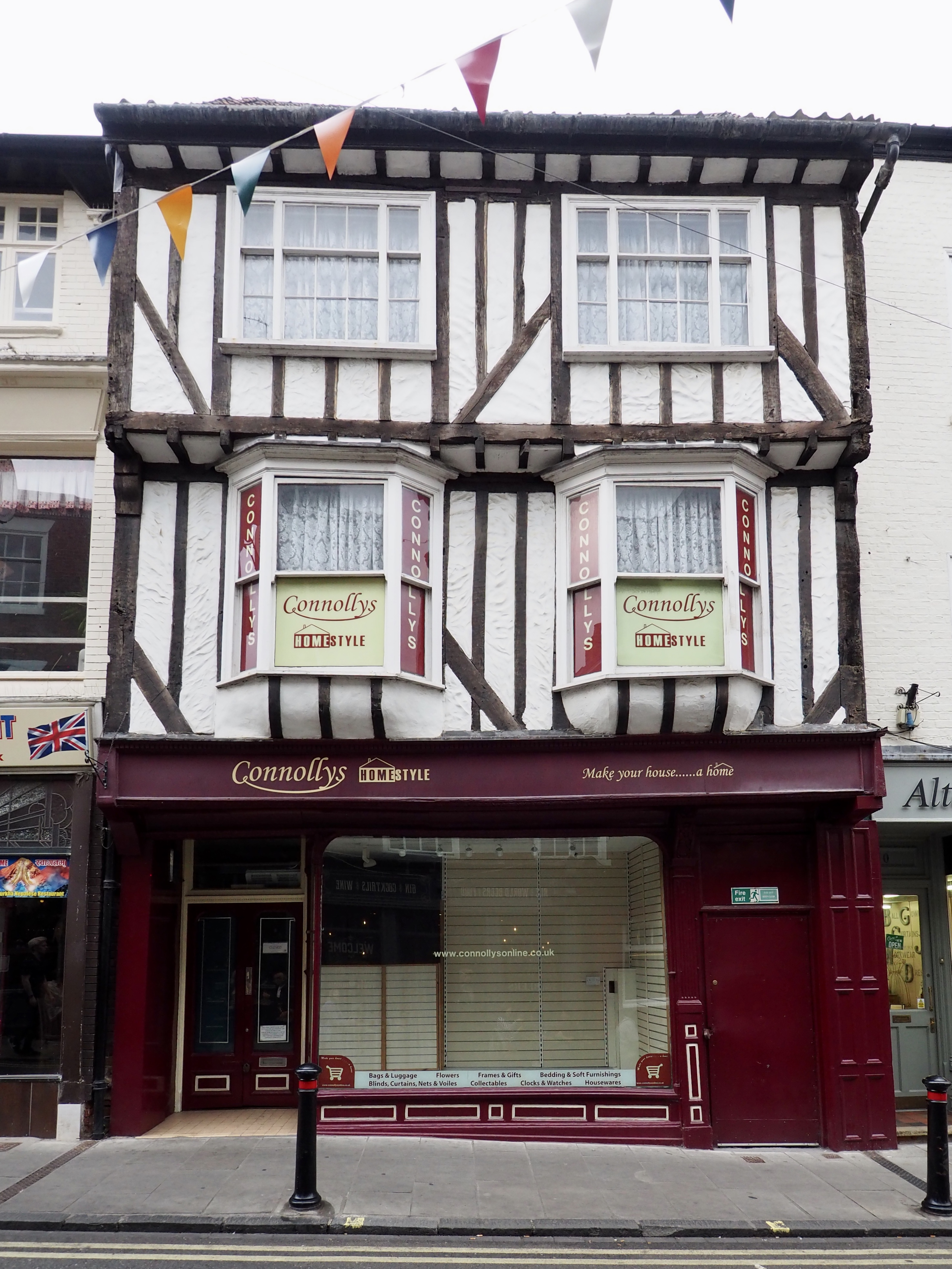
- The building in 2021
- Interactive map of the 8 Fossgate area

General information
- Status: Converted to retail use
- Type: House (former)
- Location: Fossgate, York, England
- Coordinates: 53°57′32″N 1°04′44″W
- Years built: Early 17th century (front block); Early 18th century (rear block)
- Renovated: Late 17th century (extended); 19th century (altered and extended)

Design and construction
- Designations

Listed Building – Grade II
- Official name: 8, Fossgate
- Designated: 14 June 1954
- Reference no.: 1257850

8 Fossgate is a historic building in the city centre of York, England.

The oldest part of the building is the front block, facing onto Fossgate. The early-17th-century, three-storey timber-framed building was originally one room deep. It was expanded to the rear in the late 17th century, and its former back wall was reconstructed in brick. In about 1700 a separate two-storey brick house was built at the rear of the site, incorporating what is believed to be part of the wall of the York Carmelite Friary at its base, where it faces onto Black Horse Passage. In the 19th century a long two-storey block was added to connect the two existing buildings.

The building was Grade II listed in 1954. For more than 60 years until 2020 it was occupied by Connollys Homestyle.

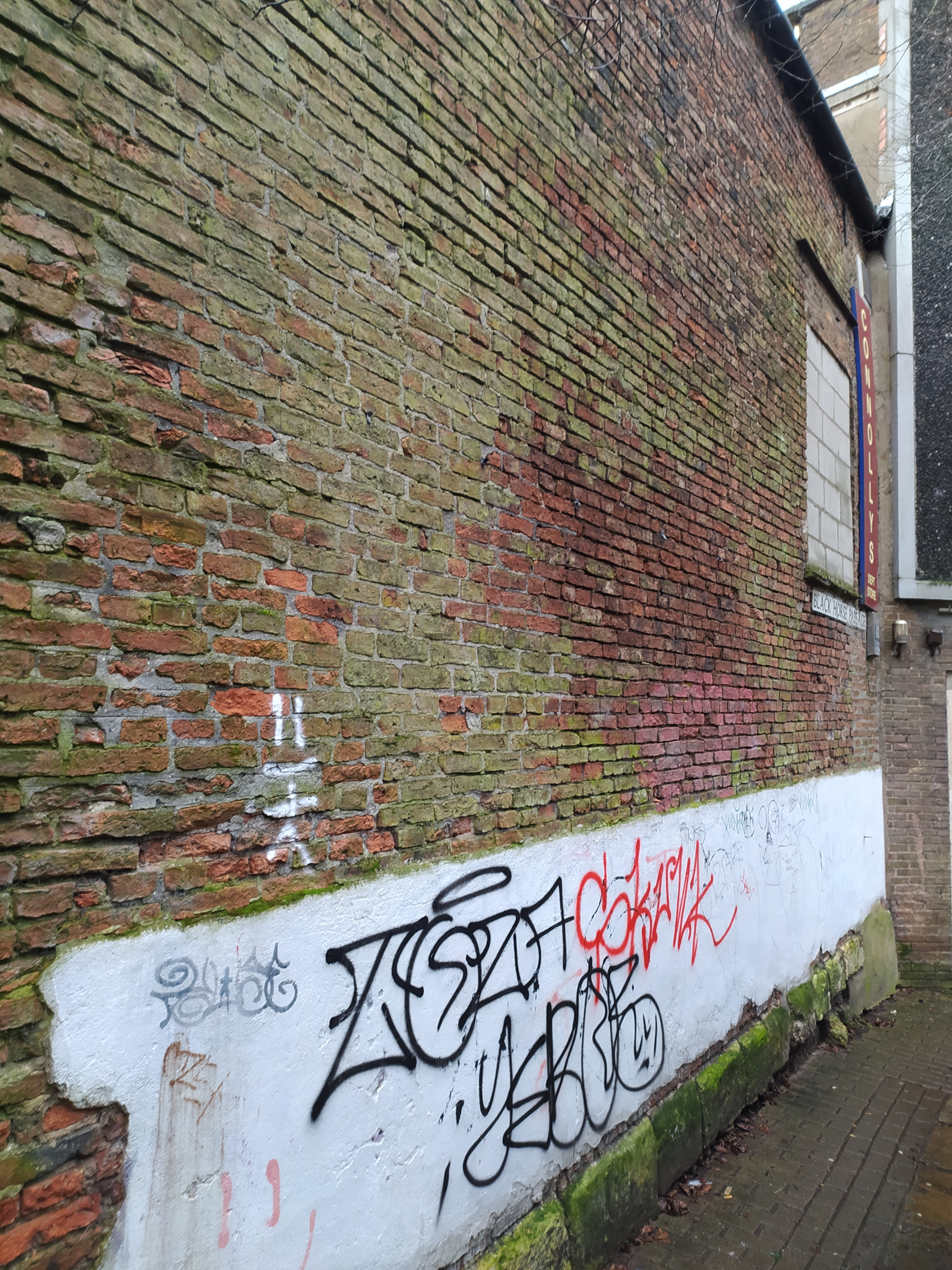
Rear of the building on Black Horse Passage, showing part of the friary wall

The front of the building is two bays wide, and its upper floors are jettied. The timber framing is visible and infilled with plaster. The ground floor has a late-19th-century shopfront. Inside, one first-floor room has late-17th-century panelling and a blocked fireplace, and there is also a staircase of this date.

== See also ==
- Listed buildings in York (within the city walls, southern part)
