= Electric Cinema =

Electric Cinema may refer to:

- The Electric, Birmingham, the oldest running cinema in the United Kingdom
- The Electric Cinema, Notting Hill, a cinema in Notting Hill, London
- Electric Cinema, York, a former cinema in York, in England
