= 35 and 36 Fossgate =

Listed former pub in York, England

- The building in 2021
- Interactive map of the 35 and 36 Fossgate area
- Former names: King's Arms Hotel (No. 35)

General information
- Status: Converted to commercial use with accommodation above
- Type: Inn (former; No. 35) and house (former; No. 36)
- Location: Fossgate, York, England
- Coordinates: 53.9547°N 1.0922°W
- Year built: c. 1812; 214 years ago
- Renovated: c. 1937 (converted); 1998 (refurbished; No. 35)

Design and construction
- Designations

Listed Building – Grade II
- Official name: 35 and 36, Fossgate
- Designated: 24 June 1983
- Reference no.: 1257820

35 and 36 Fossgate is a Grade II listed pair of buildings on Fossgate in York, England, comprising a former inn at No. 35 and a former house at No. 36. No. 35 was operating as the King's Arms Hotel by the mid‑19th century, while No. 36 remained closely associated with it and accommodated a succession of residents and small businesses throughout the 19th and early 20th centuries. Following the closure of the hotel in 1937 the properties were divided into commercial and residential units. No. 36 was purchased by the Company of Merchant Adventurers in 1979, after which it was let as a retail premises. The buildings were included in the Central Historic Core conservation area in 1968. A 2026 proposal to repair and adapt No. 36 for staff accommodation linked to the adjacent Merchant Adventurers' Hall was submitted and subsequently withdrawn.

== History ==
The buildings on Fossgate were constructed around 1812 as an inn at No. 35 and a house at No. 36, and were later altered. The earliest indication of No. 35's use appears on a map from 1848, where it is shown as the King's Arms Hotel, a description repeated on the 1852 Ordnance Survey map. No. 36 may have been constructed as an extension to the hotel, and census records show the two properties remaining associated in various ways into the 20th century.

Throughout the 19th and early 20th centuries No. 36 was occupied by a succession of residents and small businesses. In 1851 it appears to have been used as a house, possibly with a separate commercial space on the ground floor, and three cottages stood to the rear opening onto the Merchant Adventurers' Hall courtyard. Later occupants included a bookseller's family (1861), a brushmaker's household (1871) and a draper and his family (1881). By 1891 the ground floor was in shop use, with the upper floors occupied by the manager of the King's Arms. Changes to the property boundary are recorded on the 1889 Town Plan. In 1911 it was again listed as part of the King's Arms, with Clark Pallister and his family living on the premises.

By 1914 No. 36 was owned by Frederic William Catton. In 1921 the premises were occupied by Arthur Edward Dawson, a master painter, who appears to have run a business there. The hotel closed in 1937, after which the property was divided into commercial and residential units; three cottages still stood to the rear at this date, and No. 36 may have been modernised with a bathroom and kitchen. In 1947 the building was purchased by M. R. Septimus Flower from the trustees of Catton's estate, and in 1949 the rear cottages were demolished to allow for an extension to the Merchant Adventurers' Hall. In 1955 the property was purchased by Ernest Taylor, an upholsterer, who occupied it until 1979, when the Company of Merchant Adventurers acquired No. 36 and subsequently let it as a retail premises.

In 1968 the site was included within the newly established Central Historic Core conservation area, and on 24 June 1983, Nos. 35–36 were designated a Grade II listed building.

In 1998 No. 35 was refurbished, with plans to convert the upper floors to residential use and refit the ground floor as a shop. In December 2022, antiquarian and second-hand bookshop Fossgate Books announced its closure after 30 years at No. 36. In May 2026 the Company of Merchant Adventurers applied to repair and adapt No. 36, citing long‑term structural and maintenance problems and proposing to return it to use while relocating staff functions from the adjacent Grade I-listed Merchant Adventurers' Hall. The scheme included converting the ground floor to shop or office space, creating staff rooms above, and linking the building to the hall through an existing 20th‑century extension. The application was subsequently withdrawn.

== Architecture ==
The front section is built of orange brick with a timber doorway and shopfronts; the rear parts are in orange‑red brick. The front has a pantile roof with stone coping, while the other roofs are slate or pantile with brick chimneys. The building has a three‑storey, three‑bay front. No. 35 has a doorway set slightly right of centre, with panelled side pieces, a decorative frieze and a flat hood, and double panelled doors beneath a glazed fanlight. To the left are two shopfronts with large plate‑glass windows framed by panelled uprights and cornices on carved brackets. No. 36 has a plate‑glass shop window with a transom and a recessed panelled door with a plain overlight, set beneath a cornice carried on scrolled brackets. The first‑floor windows are three‑part units; those at No. 35 are replacements, while No. 36 retains sashes with narrow side lights. On the second floor, No. 35 has replacement two‑light casements and No. 36 an uneven nine‑pane sash. All windows have shallow brick arches with prominent keyblocks and painted sills. The eaves have a frieze and boxed guttering on paired brackets, with a fluted rainwater head at the right end.

The doorway of No. 35 in 2023

On the left side, a six‑panel door with a radial‑glazed fanlight sits in a round‑arched opening. Some ground‑floor windows are three‑part sashes; elsewhere there are four and 12‑pane sashes, with painted lintels on the front range and flat brick arches on the rear.

=== Interior ===
On the ground floor of No. 35 an arched opening supported by fluted side pieces marks the division of the former entrance hall. One of the front rooms retains a shaped ceiling edge, while the other has a decorative frieze. The main staircase rises to the first floor with an open structure, turned balusters set three per step, and a moulded handrail that curves upwards. A secondary stair leads to the second floor, built with a closed structure, plain balusters and a straight handrail rising to column‑shaped newels. One rear room contains a surviving cast‑iron grate with a shaped surround and shelf.

On the first floor, the doors have six raised or beaded panels. In the front room, the door, windows and chimney cupboards have surrounds with corner blocks, and the window recesses and cupboard doors have incised panels. The room also has a reeded cornice and a ceiling rose, and part of the original grate survives. Two rooms towards the rear retain cast‑iron grates, one decorated with foliage and small figures playing musical instruments.

On the third floor, several rooms keep their original fireplaces and grates, including one with an Art Nouveau design. The doors are generally of six raised panels, and one rear room contains an early-18th‑century door with two raised panels.

== See also ==
- Listed buildings in York (within the city walls, southern part)
