= 30 Pavement and 55 and 56 Fossgate =

Listed terrace in York, England

- The building in 2021
- Former names: Army and Navy Stores; Sutlers
- Alternative names: Fossgate Tap

General information
- Status: Converted to public house, bar and kitchen
- Type: Shop (former; originally three houses)
- Location: Pavement and Fossgate, York, England
- Coordinates: 53.9588°N 1.0792°W
- Year built: c. 1796; 230 years ago
- Renovated: Late 19th century (No. 30 shopfront) c. 1955 (Nos. 55–56 shopfronts)
- Owner: Camerons Brewery

Design and construction
- Designations

Listed Building – Grade II
- Official name: 55 and 56, Fossgate
- Designated: 14 June 1954
- Reference no.: 1257826

Listed Building – Grade II
- Official name: 30, Pavement
- Designated: 1 July 1968
- Reference no.: 1257826

Website
- fossgatetap.co.uk

30 Pavement and 55 and 56 Fossgate are a Grade II listed terrace on the corner of Pavement and Fossgate in York, England. Built around 1796 as three houses and later adapted for commercial use, the range was occupied by the Army and Navy Stores for more than ninety years before closing in 2012. It adjoins the separately listed 52–54 Fossgate, including the mid-17th‑century No. 54, which forms part of the combined premises now occupied by the Fossgate Tap bar and kitchen.

== History ==
The building stands on the corner of Pavement and Fossgate and was constructed around 1796 on a shallow plot. It appears to have been built as three separate houses, probably with shops below and living space above, but was later altered to form a single shop with storage. A rainwater head marked with the initials "TW" likely refers to Thomas Williams, recorded on Pavement in the late 18th century and probably linked to the building's construction. The shopfront to 30 Pavement dates from the late 19th century, while those to 55 and 56 Fossgate were added around 1955.

The commercial buildings at the junction combine structures from different periods. The earliest is 54 Fossgate, a mid‑17th‑century timber‑framed building whose upper floors were later cut back and supported in brick to align with the modern street frontage. Beside it, 55 and 56 Fossgate and 30 Pavement form the later brick range built around 1796. Although the buildings were constructed in separate eras, they were brought into shared commercial use in the 20th century when their interiors were linked and a continuous timber‑and‑glass shopfront was installed across the ground floor in the mid‑1950s.

On 14 June 1954, Nos. 55 and 56 were designated a Grade II listed building, and 30 Pavement was added to the listing on 1 July 1968. The site was also included within the newly established Central Historic Core conservation area in 1968. No. 30 Pavement stands next to Nos. 26 and 28, also listed at Grade II.

The Army and Navy Stores traded from the premises for more than ninety years, closing in 2012 when the owners retired. In August 2012 a planning application was submitted to convert the former shop to a mixed use including retail, a restaurant or café, and a bar. Permission was granted in February 2013. In March 2015 the combined building, including No. 54, opened as Sutlers bar and restaurant. In 2019 the premises reopened as the Fossgate Tap bar and kitchen, having been acquired by Camerons Brewery.

== Architecture ==
The building is constructed of buff‑grey brick with contrasting orange brick details, and has a timber cornice and shortened brick chimneys on a hipped roof of slate. The shopfront added in the 20th century uses teak, stainless steel and granite finishes.

Ground‑floor frontage on Fossgate in 2025

The front has three storeys and six bays. The shopfronts to Nos. 55 and 56 continue the design used at No. 54, with large plate‑glass windows and doors of bevelled glass with overlights. The shopfront to 30 Pavement is framed by fluted pilasters and moulded features, with a curved pair of glazed doors at the corner and plate‑glass windows above granite‑faced risers.

On the first floor there are tall 12‑pane sash windows, with unequal nine‑pane sashes above; the outer windows on both floors are in three parts. A dated rainwater head with the initials "TW" is fixed at the left end of the cornice.

The Pavement elevation has three storeys and one window bay, with a 16‑pane sash on the first floor and an unequal 12‑pane sash above. All windows have painted stone sills and flat brick heads.

== See also ==
- Listed buildings in York (within the city walls, southern part)
