= Electric Cinema, York =

Listed building in York, England

Electric Cinema
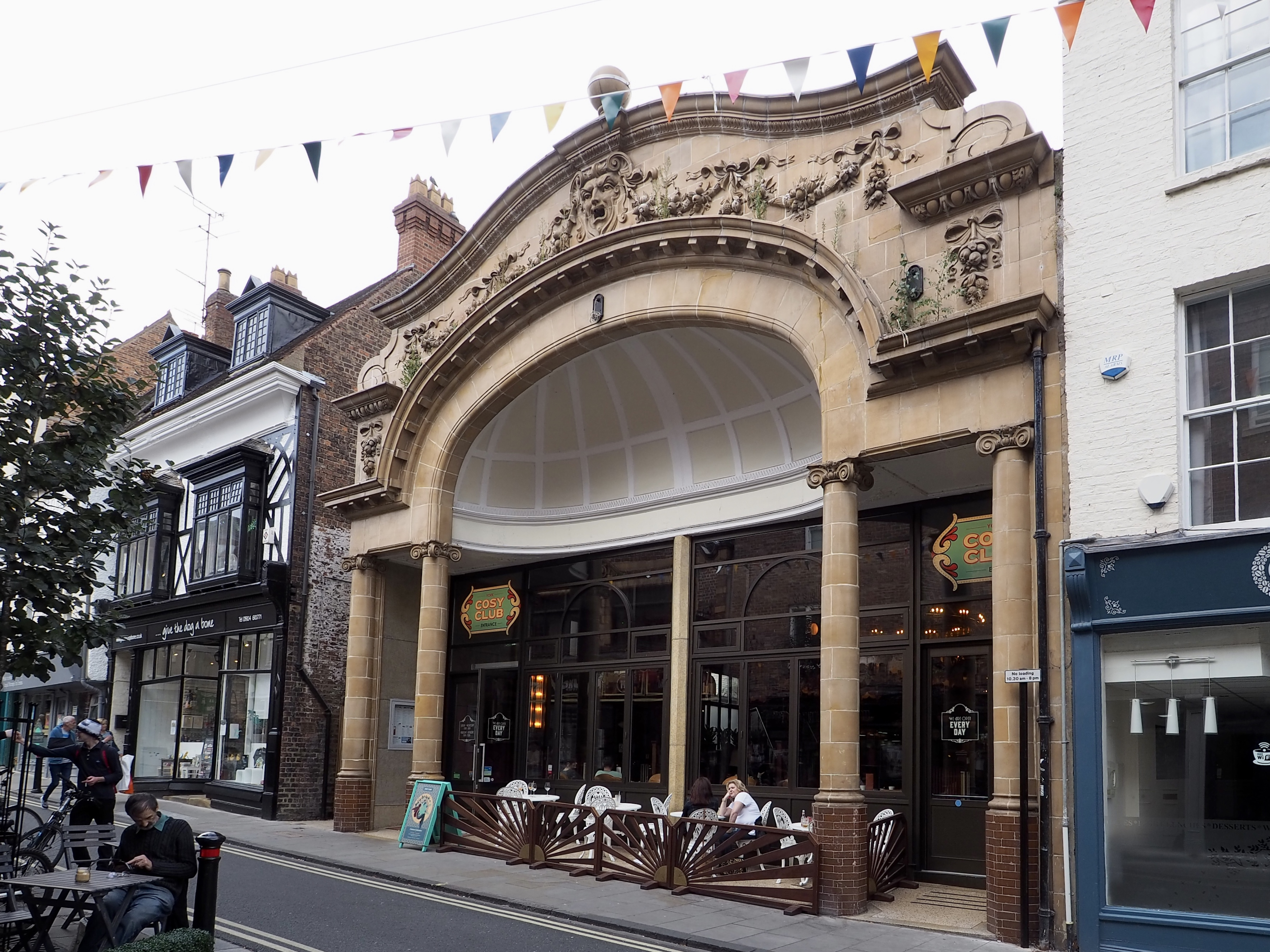
- The former cinema in 2021
- Interactive map of the Electric Cinema area
- Former names: Scala
- Alternative names: Cosy Club

General information
- Status: Converted to hospitality use
- Type: Cinema (former)
- Location: 19–22 Fossgate, York, England
- Coordinates: 53°57′31″N 1°04′42″W
- Year built: 1911; 115 years ago
- Renovated: 1957 (remodelled)

Design and construction
- Designations

Listed Building – Grade II
- Official name: Numbers 19–22 (consecutive) and attached boundary wall
- Designated: 24 June 1983
- Reference no.: 1257815

Website
- Official website

The Electric Cinema was the first purpose-built cinema in the city of York, England. It is a Grade II listed building.

Early films were screened in various temporary locations in York, and in 1908 the New Street Wesleyan Chapel was converted into the Hippodrome Cinema. In 1911 National Electric Theatres constructed the Electric Cinema as the first purpose-built cinema in the city, standing on Fossgate in the city centre. In 1951 the cinema was renamed the Scala, but it closed in 1957.

The empty cinema was purchased by Macdonalds furniture shop, which already occupied the building next door. The shop closed in 2016, and the following year the premises reopened as the Cosy Club restaurant and bar.

The oldest part of the building is the boundary wall at the rear, the base of which is medieval, with later additions, and originally formed part of the wall of the York Carmelite Friary. In front of it stands a late-19th-century building, now fully incorporated into the main front block, which dates from 1911. The Fossgate front is covered in glazed tiles and faience and takes the form of a large arch supported on columns. Inside, various plaster mouldings from the cinema survive, as does the decorated panelled ceiling.

== See also ==
- Listed buildings in York (within the city walls, southern part)
