= Maud Sellers =

British historian and museum curator

- Born: 1861; Harrogate, North Yorkshire, England
- Died: 1939 (aged 77–78); York, England
- Education: Trinity College, Dublin
- Occupations: Historian, curator
- Employer: Merchant Adventurers' Hall

Maud Sellers (1861–1939) was a British historian and museum curator.

== Biography ==
Sellers studied at Newnham College, Cambridge, before gaining her PhD from Trinity College, Dublin, in 1907. She was one of the "steamboat ladies" who travelled to Dublin to receive a degree while they were not offered to women by the University of Cambridge.

Sellers was interested in the history of the Merchant Adventurers' Hall in York, which she had first visited in 1895 and became involved in the restoration of the hall and the study of the Company of Merchant Adventurers. In 1913 Sellers was made a Member of that Company and was its first woman member in over 400 years. She became the Company's honorary archivist in 1918 and worked as the curator of the guild hall.

== Publications ==
- Sellers, M. 1897. "York in the Sixteenth and Seventeenth Centuries", The English Historical Review 12(47), 437–447.
- Sellers, M. 1908. The Acts and Ordinances of the Eastfield Company. London, Royal Historical Society.
- Sellers, M. 1912. York Memorandum Book part 1 (1376–1419) lettered A–Y in the Guildhall muniment room. Surtees Society.
- Sellers, M. (ed.) 1918. The York Mercers and Merchant Adventurers 1356–1917. Durham.
- Sellers, M. 1921. A Short Account of the Company of Adventurers of York.
