= St John's in the Marsh Church, York =

Church in York, England

Coordinates: 53°57′32.6″N 1°04′35.6″W

St John's in the Marsh (also known as St John the Baptist) was a church in York, United Kingdom. It was located near the River Foss and Hungate, adjacent to the Hungate dig.

The church was built sometime before 1154 and demolished by 1550, about the time of the Reformation but not closed because of it.
