= Fossgate =

Street in York, England

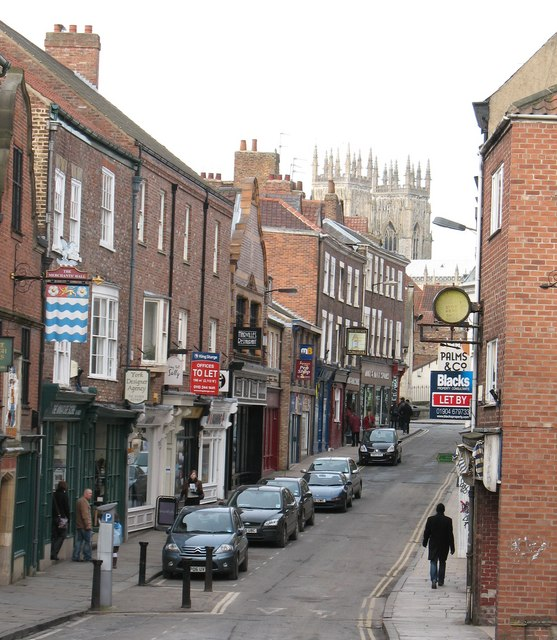
- View north on Fossgate, from Foss Bridge
- Location within York
- Location: York, England
- Postal code: YO
- Coordinates: 53.9584°N 1.0786°W
- North west end: Pavement; Whip-Ma-Whop-Ma-Gate; Stonebow
- South east end: Walmgate

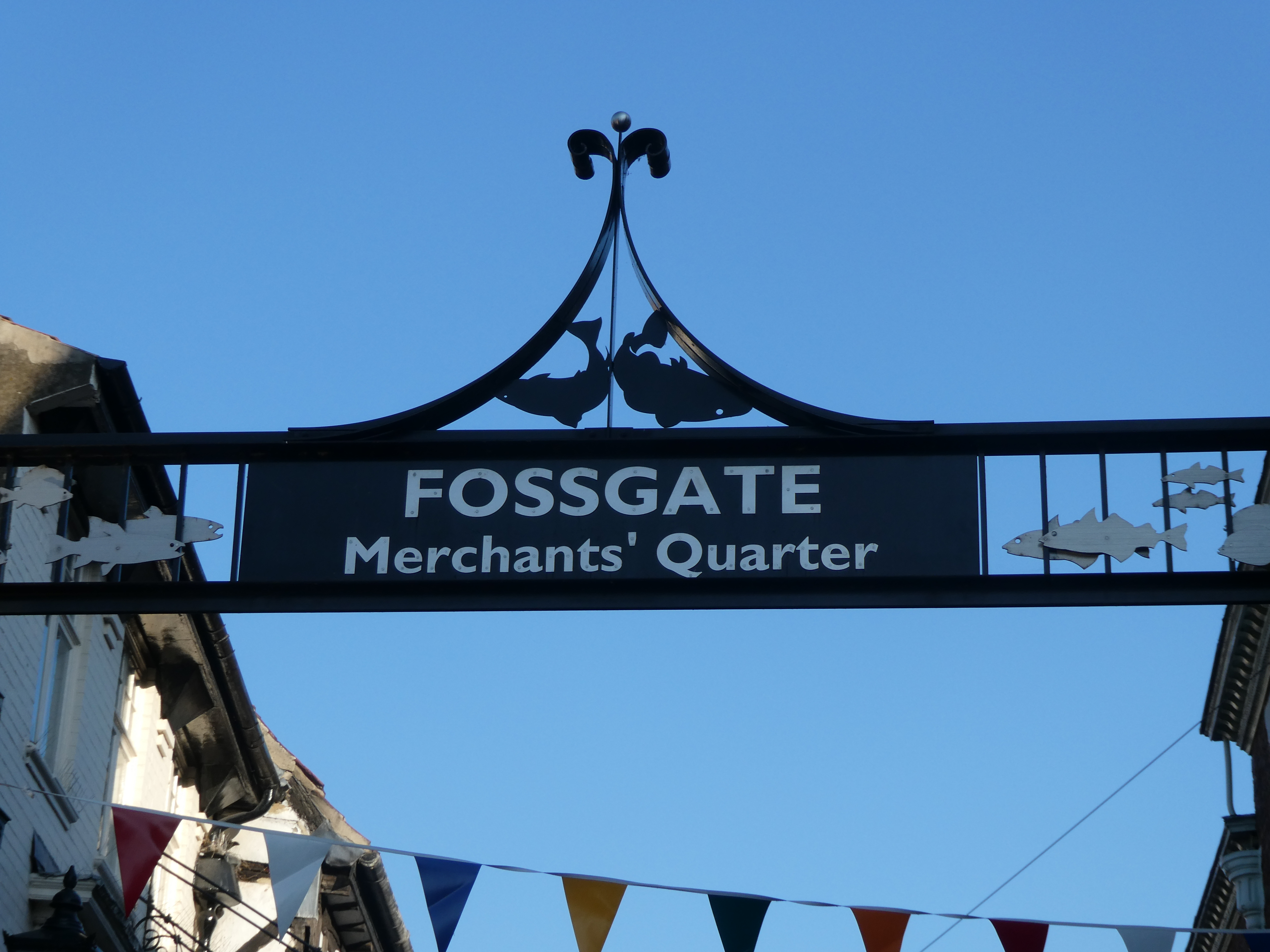
A sign at the north entrance

Fossgate is a street in the city centre of York, England.

== History ==
The street is believed to follow the line of a Roman road leading south-east out of Eboracum. Although it lay outside the Roman walls, a civilian settlement is known to have existed in the area. There is no evidence of occupation in the Anglian period, but in Scandinavian Jorvik it was fully built up, mostly for industrial and commercial uses.

The street was first mentioned in about 1130. In the medieval period it fell within the parish of St Crux, and that church was sometimes regarded as standing on the street, although it was entered from Pavement. In 1295, the York Carmelite Friary was built to the east of the street, and it was entered from a gateway near the Pavement end of Fossgate. In 1357, the Merchant Adventurer's Hall was built, set back from the street. Many of the boundaries between building plots also date from this period.

In 1590, a cattle market was established on the street, held every second Thursday, and from 1632 an annual cattle fair was also held. By the 19th century it was being held further out of town. In 1663, the St Crux Parish Almshouse was built on the street, but it was demolished in 1935. Most of the buildings on the street were repeatedly reconstructed from the 17th to the 19th century, and the street was widened in 1812. A brewery operated on the street.

By the 19th century Fossgate was regarded as one of the poorer streets in the city, and the York's Chartist Association Room was on Straker's Passage, just off the street. A Methodist Sunday school was built in 1822, and the following year it also became an infants' school, closing in 1853.

With the decline of trade along the River Foss in the 20th century, Fossgate became less important. It is currently lined with independent shops, pubs and restaurants.

== Layout and architecture ==
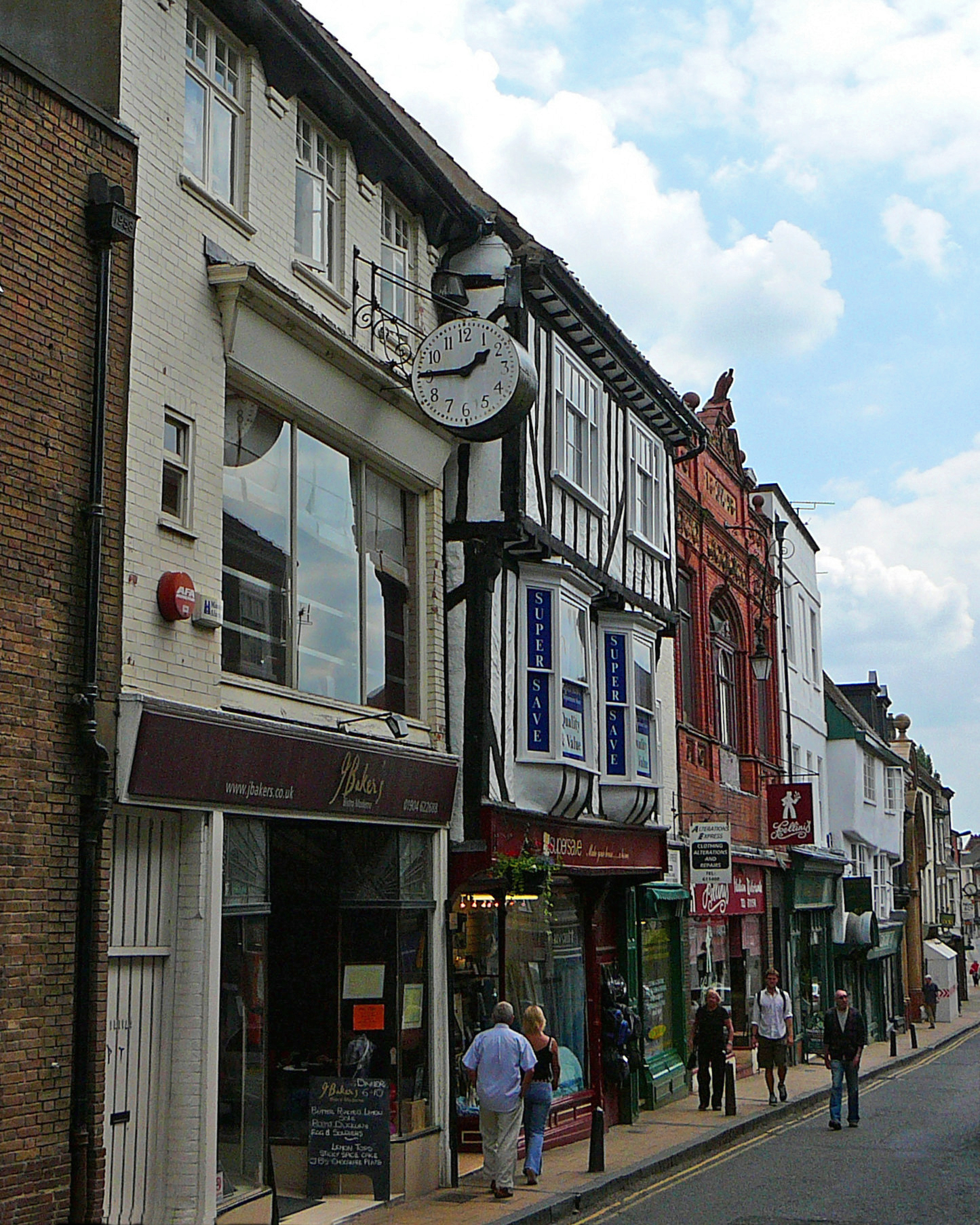
The north-east side of Fossgate, looking south

The street runs south-east, from the junction of Pavement, Whip-Ma-Whop-Ma-Gate and Stonebow, to Foss Bridge over the River Foss. Beyond the river, it continues as Walmgate. Lady Peckett's Yard, a snickelway, runs off the south-west side of the street, while Straker's Passage and Franklin's Yard run off its north-east side.

Notable buildings on the north-east side include the 17th-century No. 8; the timber-framed Nos. 15–16, built about 1600; the former Electric Cinema at Nos. 19–22, the city's first purpose-built cinema; the early-19th-century No. 23; and Nos. 25–25A, a late-19th-century house with a shop now occupied by the Fossgate Social café-bar.

On the south-west side lie Nos. 35–36, built in about 1812 as the King's Arms inn and a house; the Grade II*-listed Blue Bell pub at No. 53, co-listed with Nos. 52 and 54; Nos. 55–56, built in 1796 and now the Fossgate Tap; and the 17th-century gatehouse to the Merchant Adventurers' Hall, with the Grade I-listed hall itself hidden behind.
