= Hungate (York) =

Street in York, England

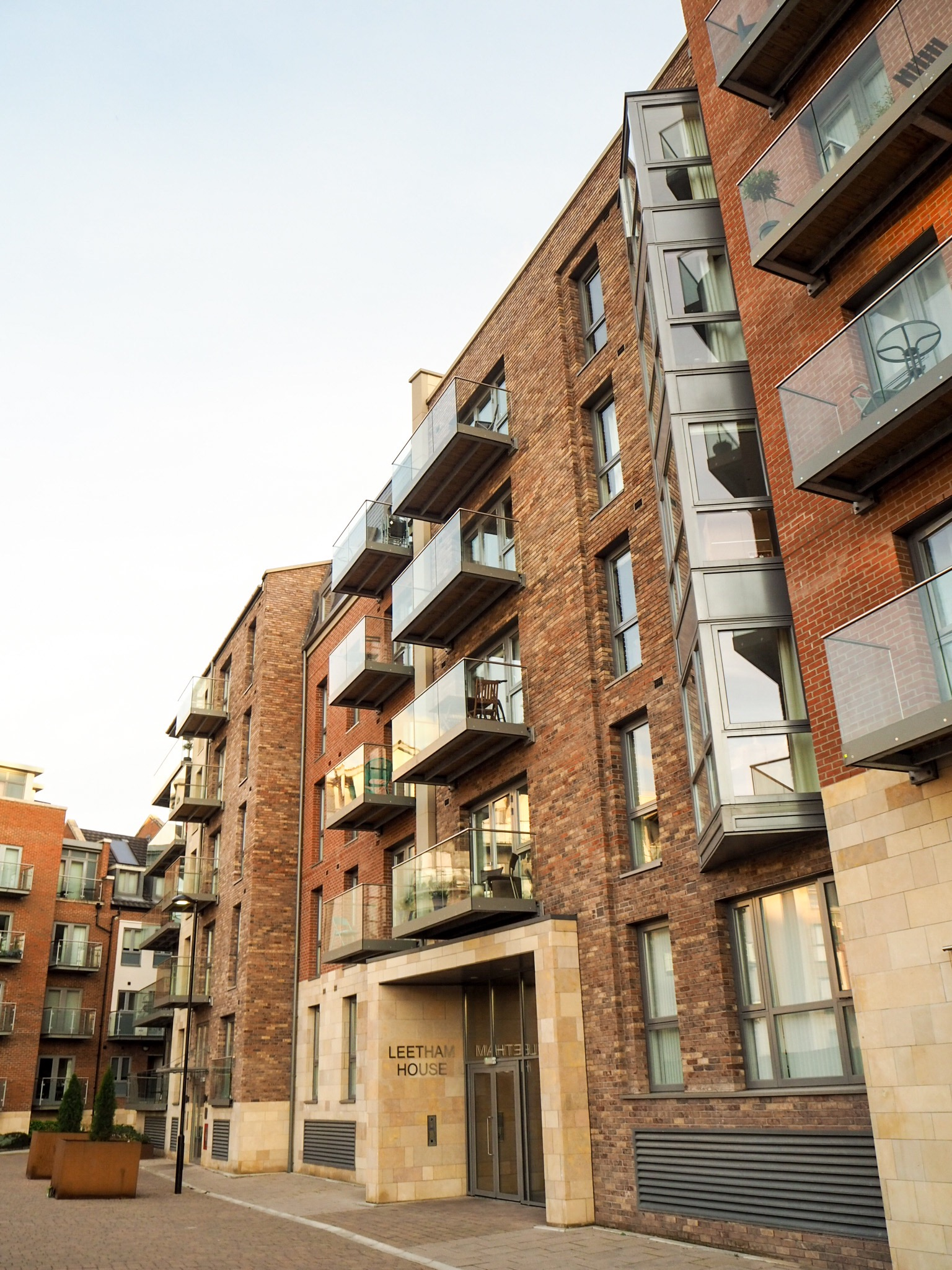
- Leetham House, in the Hungate area
- Location within York
- Former name: Merske Street
- Location: York, England
- Coordinates: 53.9591°N 1.0765°W
- North west end: Stonebow

Hungate is a street in the city centre of York, England, and the area surrounding it. Notable buildings in the wider Hungate area include the city's central telephone exchange.

== History ==
The area in which the street lies was largely marshland in the Roman Eboracum period, although to its west there was a quay on the River Foss, and there were also some defensive ditches. The street was first recorded in the late-12th century as "Hundegat in Mersch", and was also known as "Merske Street". To its west was the York Carmelite Friary, while St John's in the Marsh Church was constructed near the southern end of the street, although this was sold off in 1550. The hall of the Cordwainers' Company lay on the street, but it was sold off and demolished when the company was dissolved, in 1808.

In 1837, a gas works was constructed at the south-eastern end of the street by the York Union Gas Light Company. By 1840, the street was regarded as a slum, and in 1901 it was one of the key areas covered by Seebohm Rowntree's study, Poverty, A Study of Town Life. These buildings were cleared in 1936, and from 1950 its northern end was truncated as the Stonebow was constructed.

In 2009, construction started on a major mixed-use scheme in the area, including offices, housing, shops, a community space, and a bridge across the River Foss. As part of the scheme, a five-year archaeological investigation was conducted, the largest ever in the city.

== Layout and architecture ==
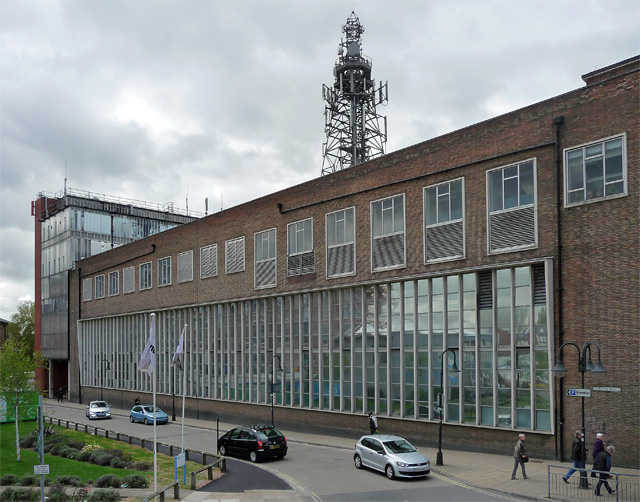
The telephone exchange

The street runs south east from the Stonebow. Carmelite Street leads off its south-west side, and Palmer Lane off its north-east side. Historically, it extended further north-west, to a junction with St Saviourgate, and further south-east, to reach the River Foss, and had junctions with more streets, including Garden Place.

The city's central telephone exchange, built in 1953, was situated in The Stonebow. Designed by A. Lloyd-Spencer for the Ministry of Works it came into service on 26 November 1955, replacing the former automatic exchange in Lendal; it has since been significantly extended. On 31 December 2003, the exchange was moved to Leeds and Doncaster.
