= The Blue Bell, York =

Listed pub in York, England

The Blue Bell
- The pub in 2025

General information
- Type: Public house
- Location: 52–54 Fossgate, York, England
- Coordinates: 53°57′31″N 1°04′45″W
- Completed: Late 17th century
- Renovated: Late 18th century (refronted); Late 19th century (No. 53 refitted); 20th century (No. 52 remodelled) c. 1932 (No. 54 refitted)

Design and construction
- Designations

Listed Building – Grade II*
- Official name: The Blue Bell
- Designated: 14 June 1954
- Reference no.: 1257825

Website
- bluebellyork.com

The Blue Bell is a historic pub in the city centre of York, England. It stands on the south-west side of Fossgate.

== History ==
The building was constructed in the late 17th century, as a five-bay timber-framed house, with a central staircase. It originally had a jettied front, but it was refronted in the 18th century. The facade of the lower two floors was replaced with brick, while the top floor appears to have been retained and rendered over. At the rear, the original jettied facade survives, although its ground floor is obscured by later outbuildings. Around this time, the house was divided in two, the other half becoming 54 Fossgate.

In 1798, 53 Fossgate opened as The Blue Bell. The pub was later purchased by C. J. Melrose and Sons, a local chain of pubs and wine merchants. In 1903, the chain refurbished it, and it retains its layout and fittings from this period. These include doors, windows, glazed screens with service hatches and varnished matchboarding on the walls. In 1974, it suffered a fire, but largely survived intact. Plans emerged in the 1990s to expand the pub, but these were abandoned.

The pub is entered through a corridor, widened slightly into a lobby, which contains a single tip-up seat by the bar. CAMRA considers this lobby a forerunner of the drinking lobbies which became popular in northern England in the inter war period.

In 1903, George Robinson became the landlord of the pub; he was later the founding director of York City F.C., and the club initially held its meetings in the pub. On his death, the licence passed to his wife, Annie, and then to their daughter, Edith Pinder. She only retired in 1992, since when it has changed hands several times but has been maintained in the same style. Originally Grade II listed in 1954, in 1997 it was upgraded to Grade II* on the strength of its interior, one of very few pubs to be awarded this grade for internal features.

In 2017, the pub was listed as an asset of community value, in reaction to concerns that, following a take-over of owners Punch Taverns, it might be asset stripped. At the time, it sold beers and ciders, pork pies and bread, but banned large groups, swearing, music and fruit machines. One of the smallest pubs in the city, it has a capacity of 65 people. In the past, it experimented with discouraging large groups by putting up signs reading "private party", which regulars knew could be ignored. This led to its removal from the Good Beer Guide, and a new landlord in 2018 abandoned the approach.

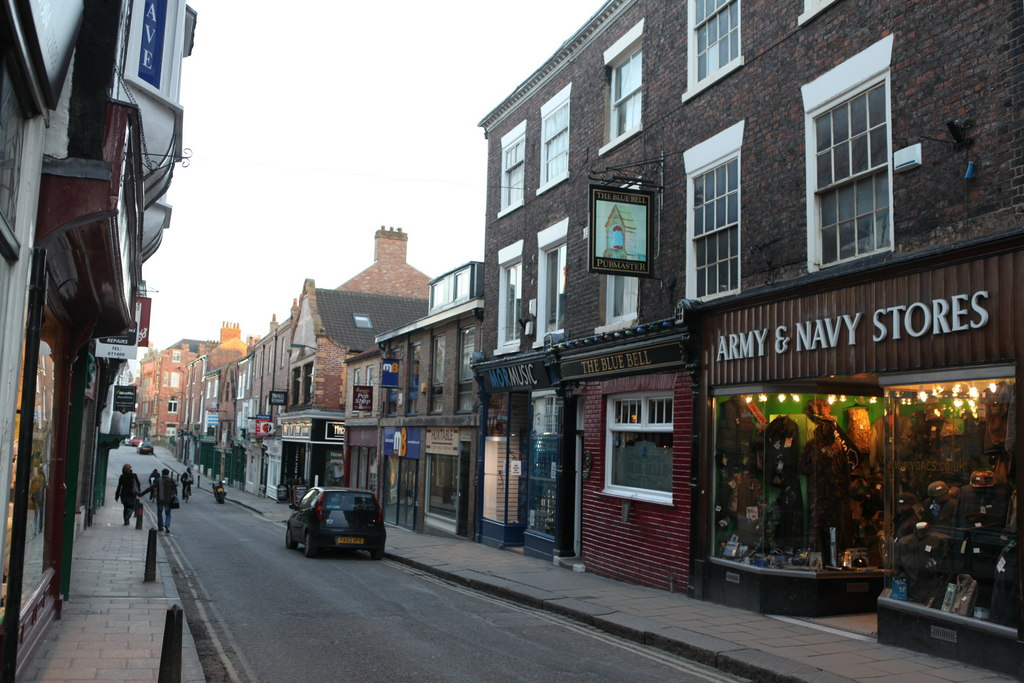
The pub and neighbouring buildings, seen in 2010

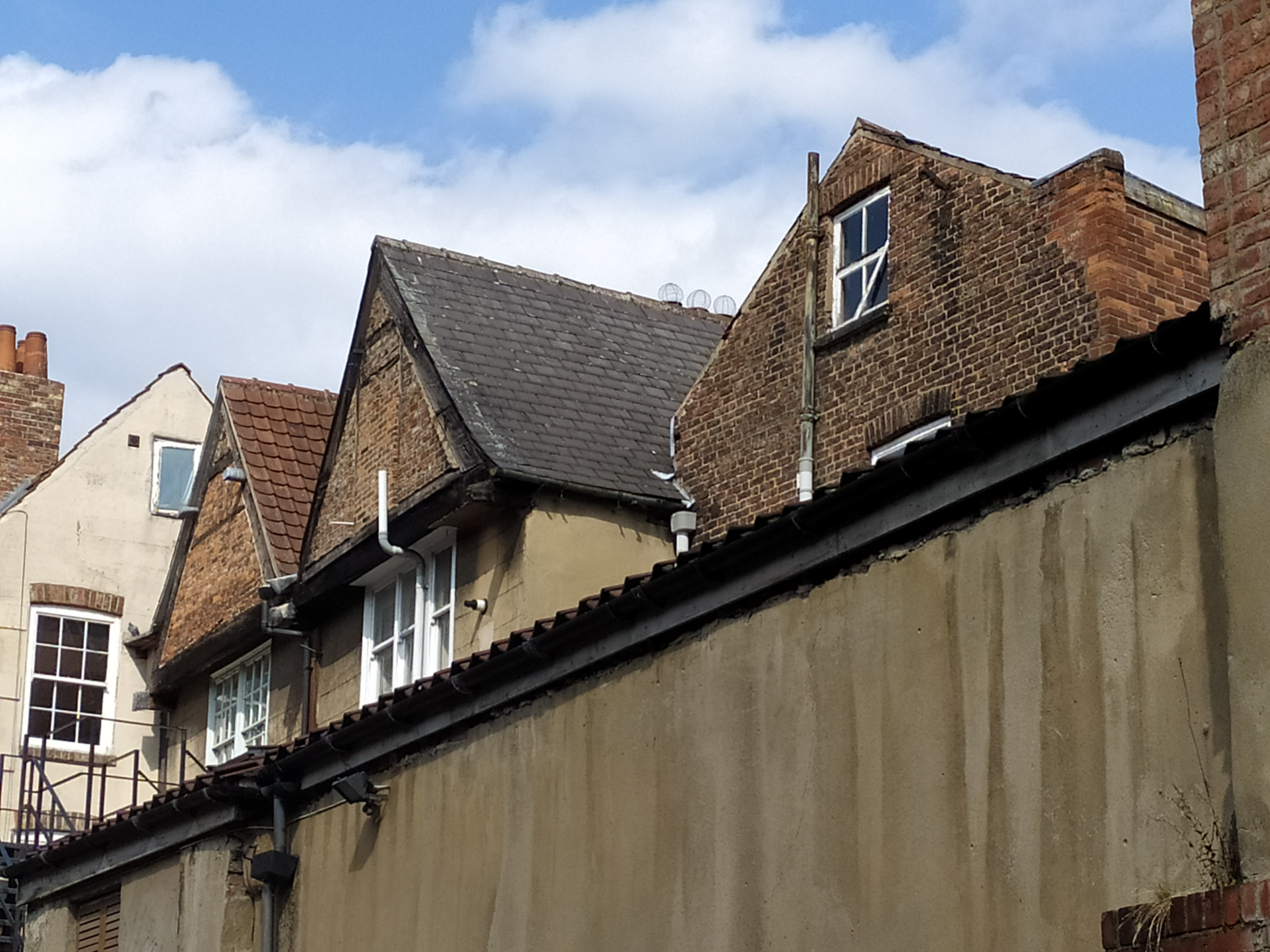
Rear of the building, showing the jettying

== See also ==
- Grade II* listed buildings in the City of York
- Listed buildings in York (within the city walls, southern part)
