= Merchant Adventurers' Hall =

Grade I listed building in York, England

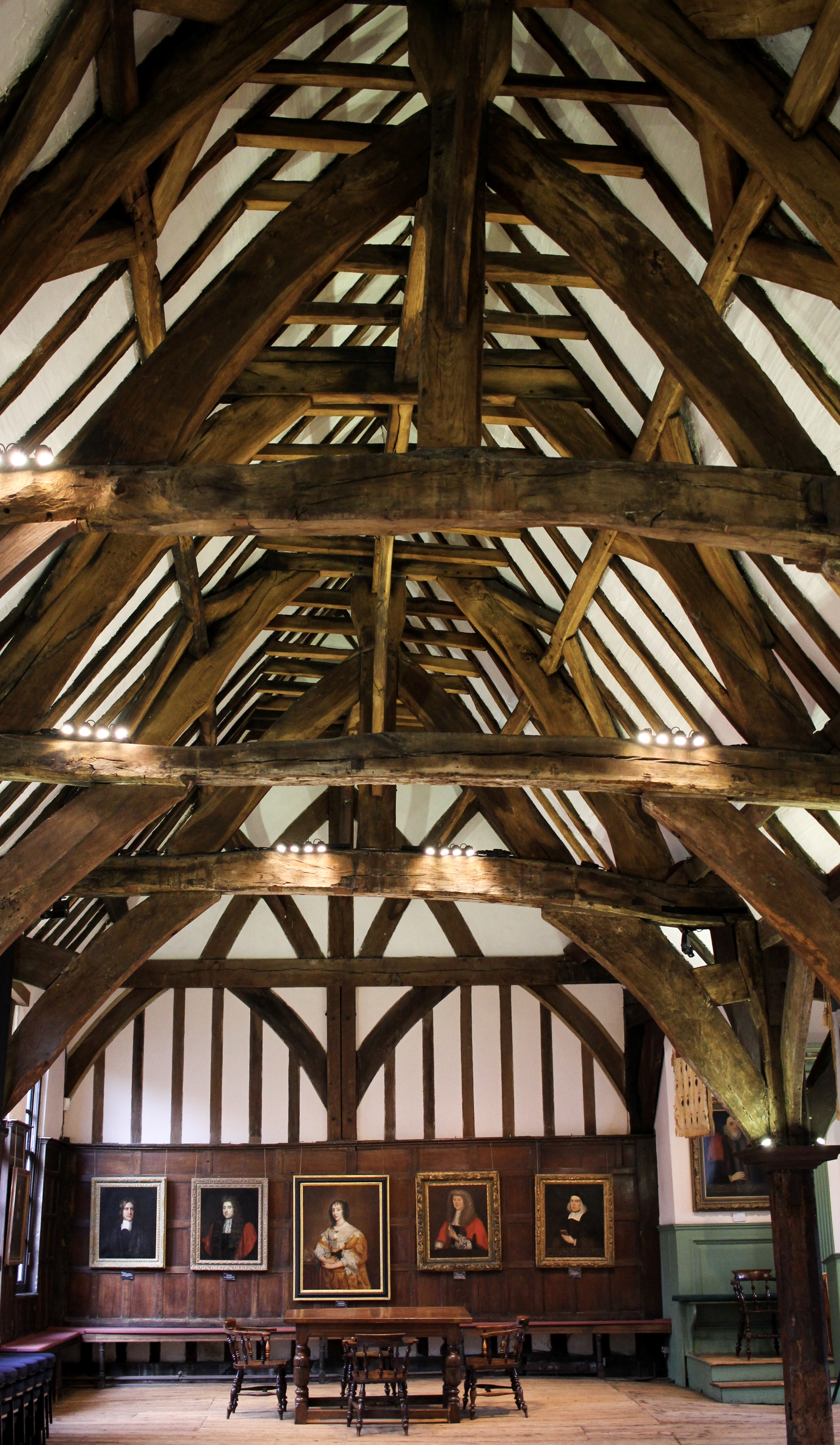
- Medieval timber frame of the great hall interior

- Location within North Yorkshire

General information
- Type: Medieval Guildhall
- Location: Fossgate, York, England
- Coordinates: 53.9579°N 1.0788°W
- Construction started: 1357
- Completed: 1361
- Owner: The Company of Merchant Adventurers of the City of York

Website
- merchantshallyork.org

Listed Building – Grade I
- Official name: Merchant Adventurers Hall
- Designated: 14 June 1954
- Reference no.: 1257828

Listed Building – Grade II*
- Official name: Gatehouse to Merchant Adventurers Hall
- Designated: 14 June 1954
- Reference no.: 1257822

The Merchant Adventurers' Hall is a medieval guildhall on Fossgate in the city of York, England. It is a Grade I listed building and scheduled ancient monument.

== History ==
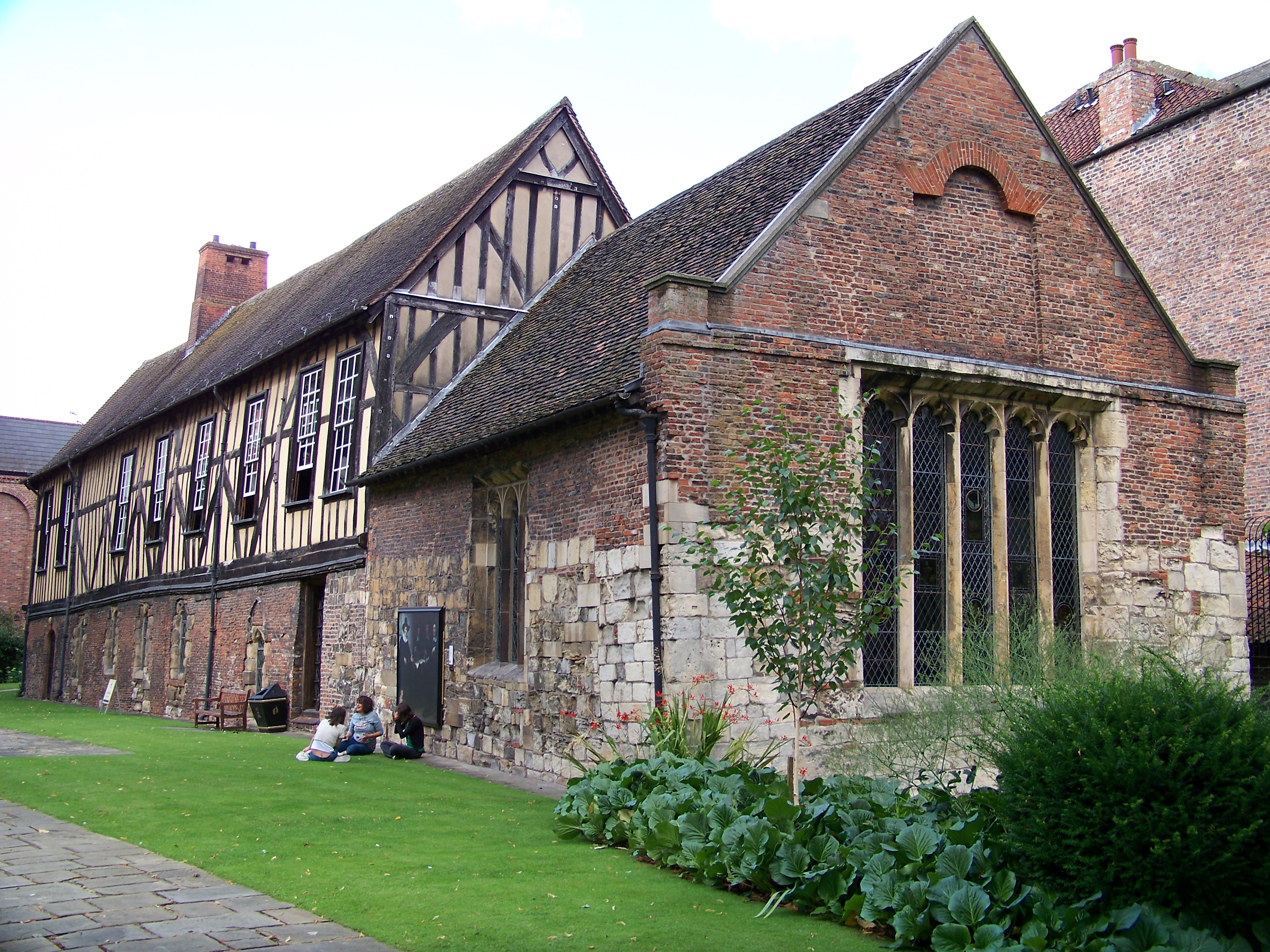
The medieval Merchant Adventurers' Hall seen from Piccadilly. On the right is the brick chapel; on the left the timber-frame construction of the upper storey can be seen.

The majority of the hall was built between 1357 and 1361 by a group of influential men and women who came together to form a religious fraternity called the Guild of Our Lord Jesus and the Blessed Virgin Mary. In 1371, a hospital was established in the undercroft for the poor people of York and, in 1430, the fraternity was granted a royal charter by King Henry VI and renamed 'The Mistry of Mercers'. It was granted the status of the Company of Merchant Adventurers of the City of York by Queen Elizabeth I in 1581. The principal parts of the building are the Great Hall, the chapel and the undercroft.

The Great Hall is a timber-framed structure and was built over a five-year period. It is the largest timber-framed building in the UK still standing and used for its original purpose. The roof of the hall is of two spans supported by a row of large central timber posts. It includes complex crown posts and is held together by wooden pegs. The undercroft, like the Great Hall, is divided in two by its supporting row of timber posts. The undercroft also provides access to an attached chapel built for the use of the ill and poor in the hospital as well as the members of the Merchant Adventurers' Guild. It is still used for worship.

The hall belongs to and is still regularly used by The Company of Merchant Adventurers of the City of York, who, although no longer dedicated to mercantile activities are prominent in York and still exist as a charitable membership group. The company has an extensive set of records, with documents dating from the 13th century and accounts dating back to 1432. The Borthwick Institute for Archives at the University of York holds photocopies of many of the medieval deeds, account rolls, rentals, and of Guild minutes for the period 1677–1985. From 1918, the Company appointed Maud Sellers as an honorary archivist of its historical material - Sellers was a historian with an interest in the site and was involved in its restoration and study from 1895.

Works of art in the hall include a painting by Jan Griffier entitled Dutch snow scene with skaters, a painting by Joseph Farington depicting the Old Ouse Bridge at York and a portrait by William Etty of his brother, John Etty.

It is a short walk from this hall to the Merchant Taylors' Hall in York, another medieval guildhall but in less original condition.

== Gallery ==
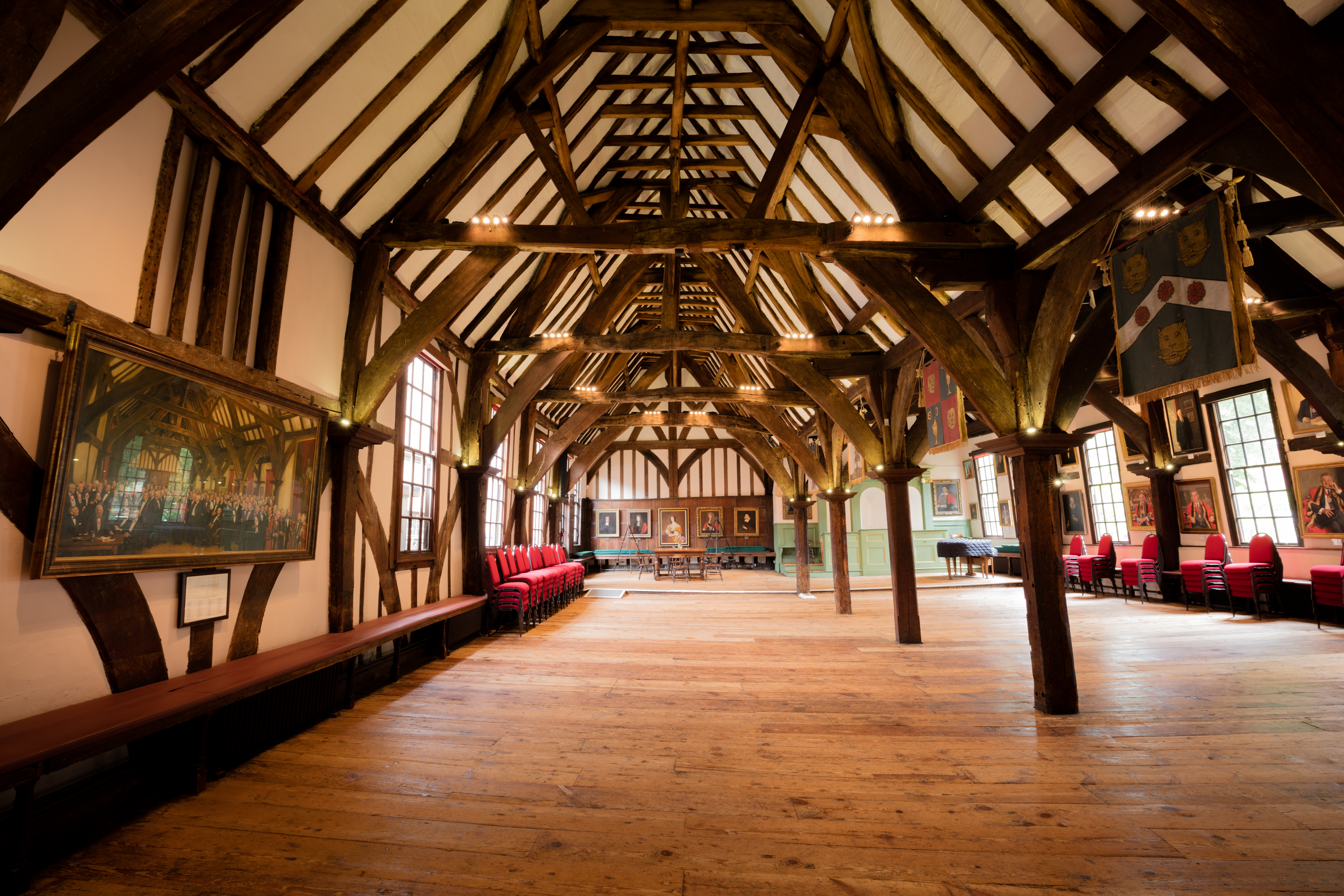
The Great Hall

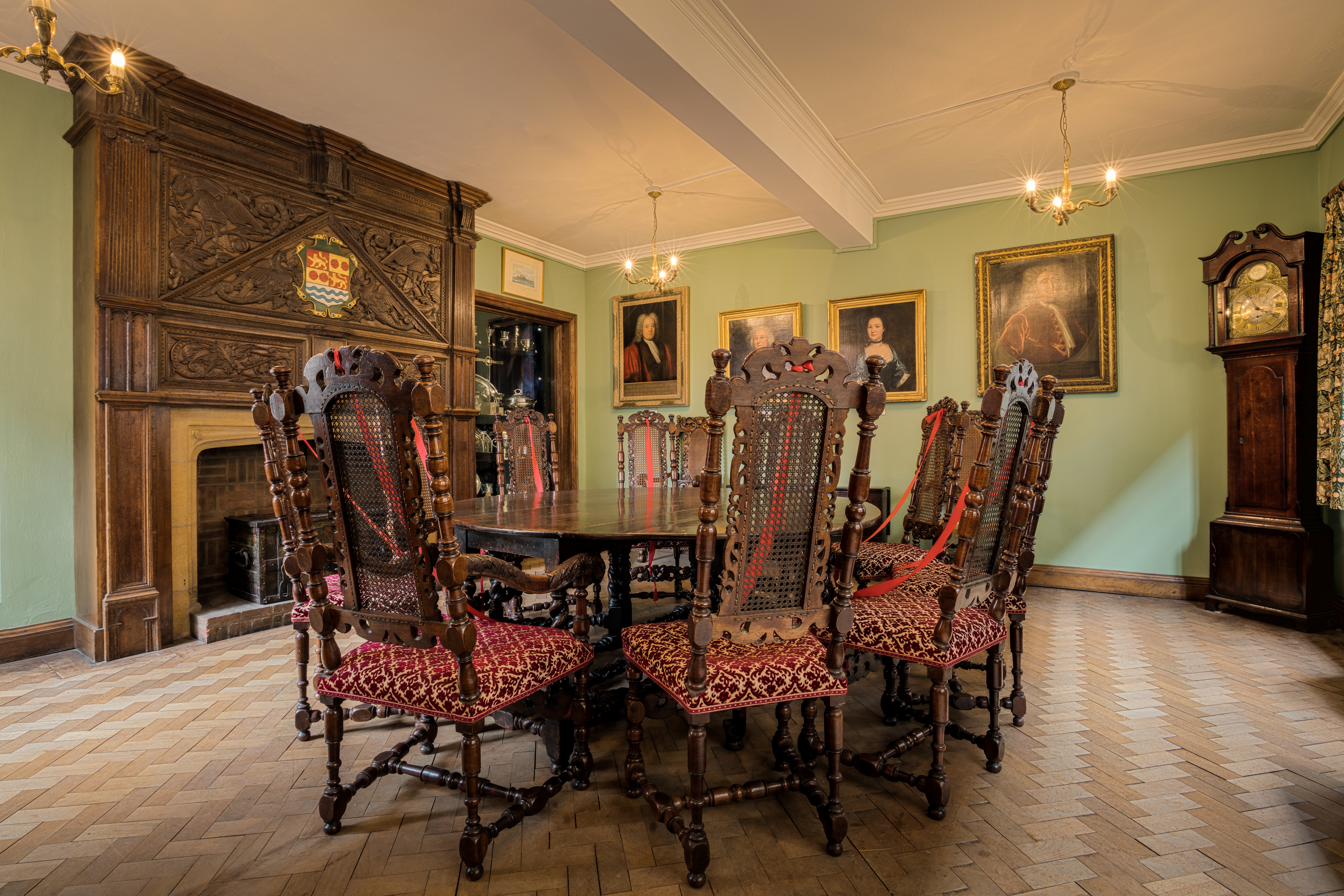
The Governors Parlour Room

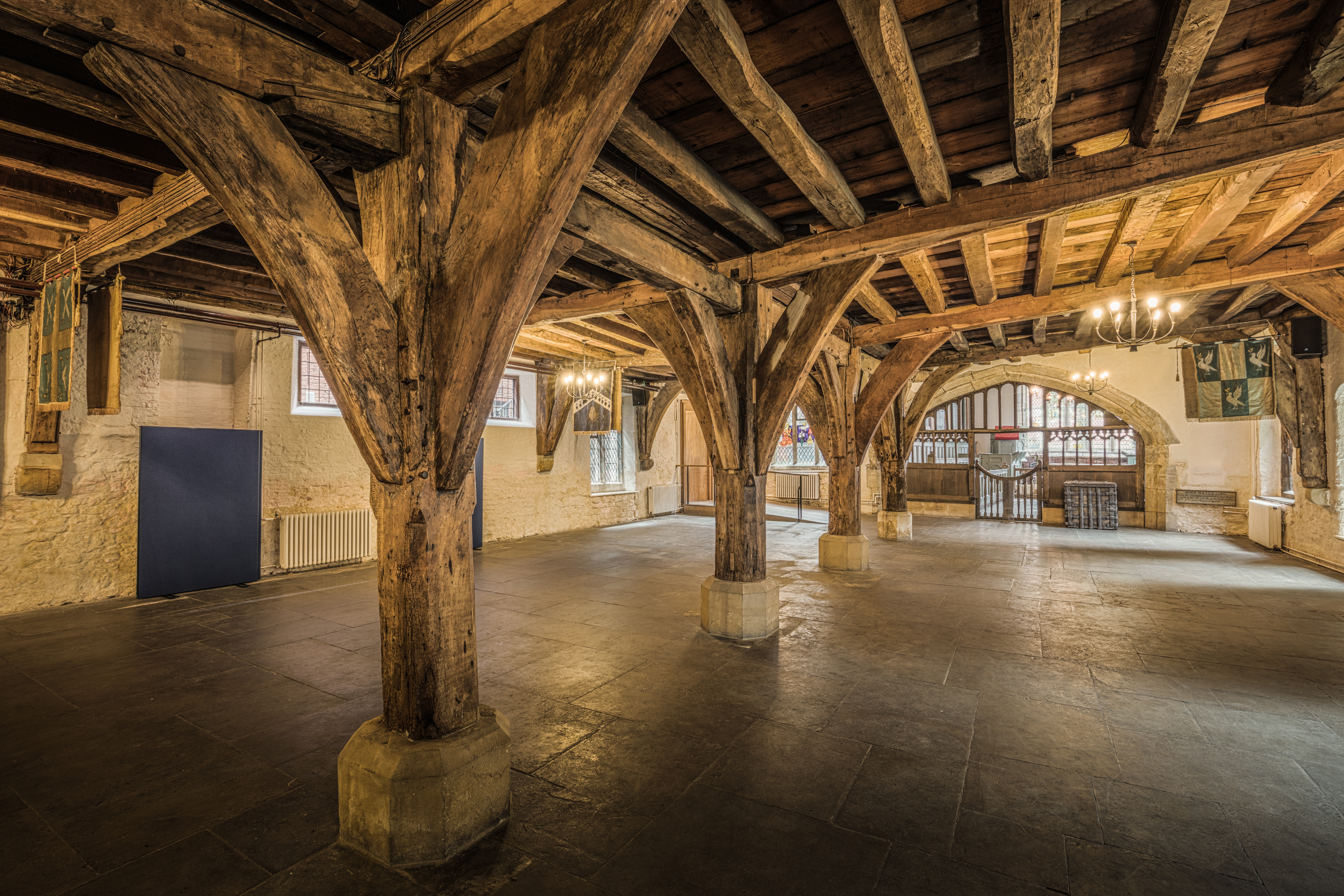
The Undercroft

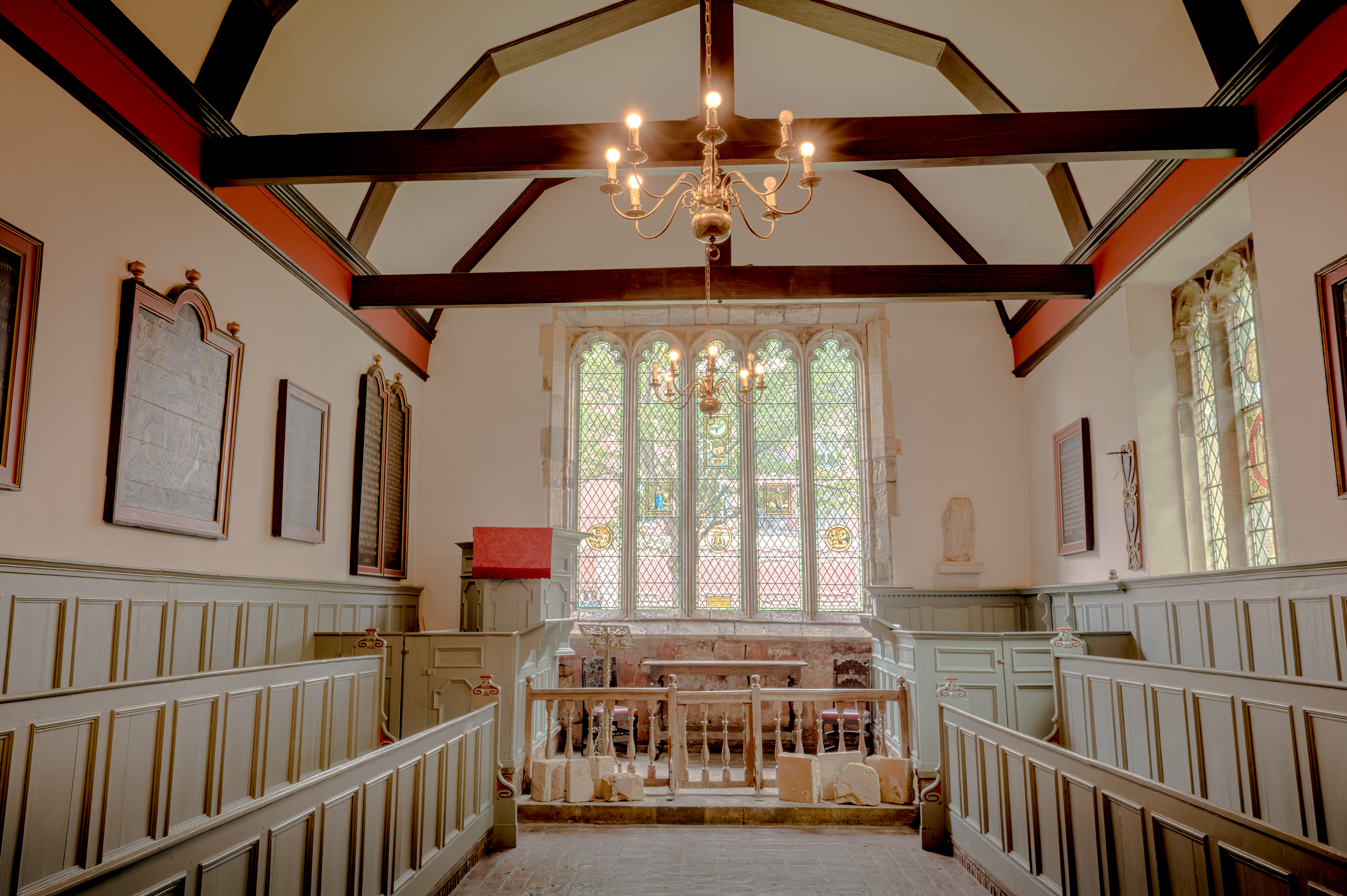
The Chapel

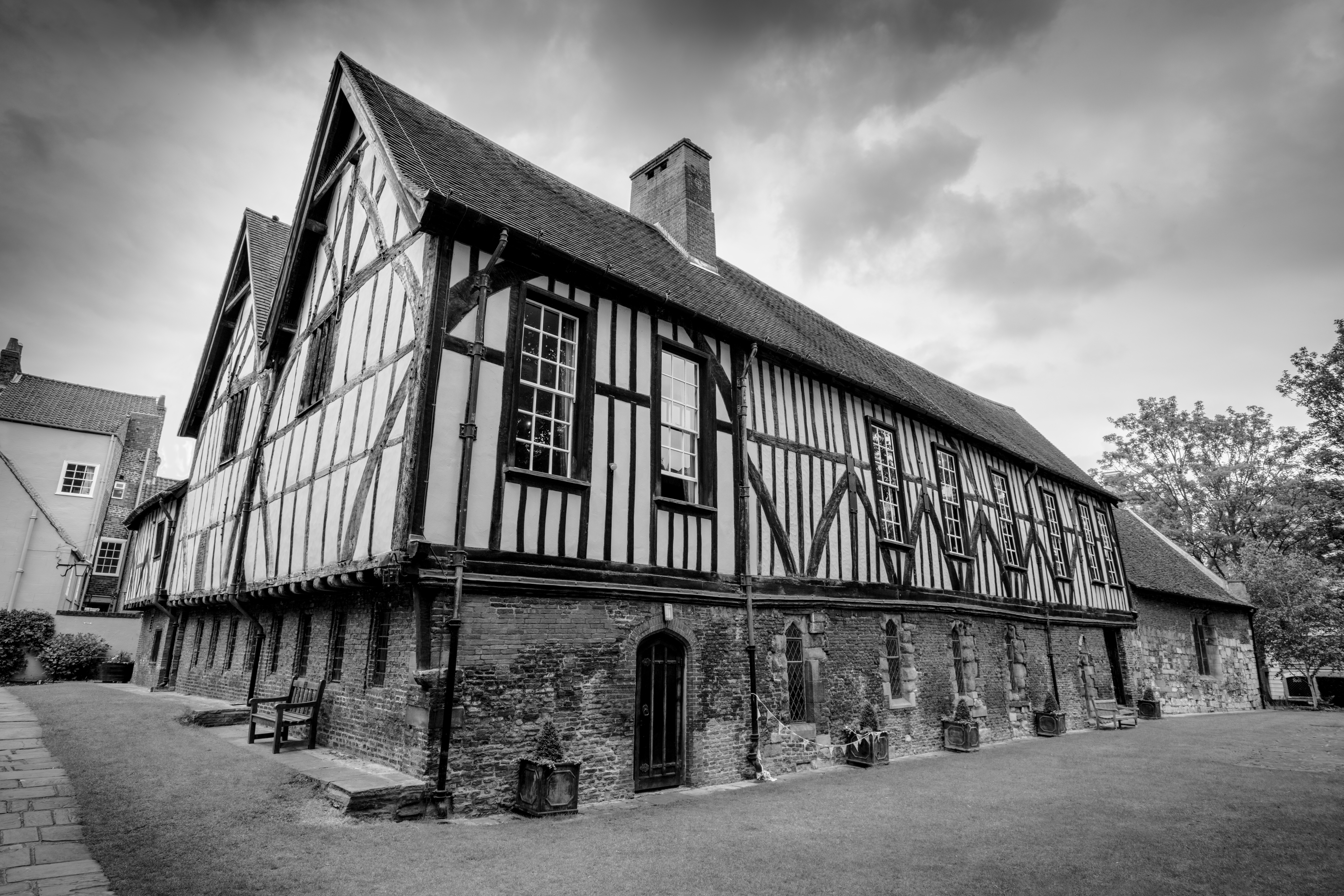
Exterior

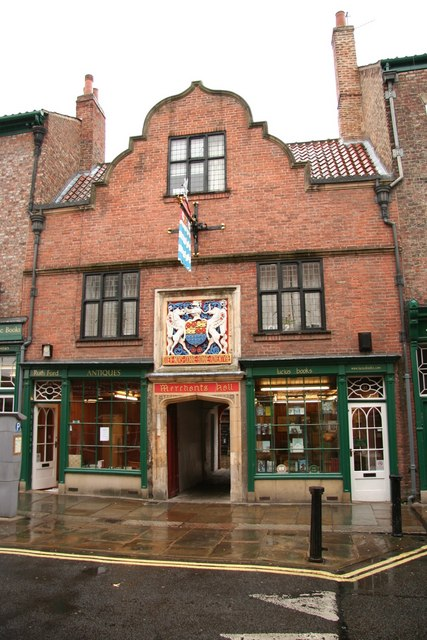
The Gatehouse

Portal of the Gatehouse

== See also ==
- Grade I listed buildings in the City of York
- Listed buildings in York (within the city walls, southern part)
