= York Carmelite Friary =

Friary in York, England

Coordinates: 53.9587°N 1.0780°W

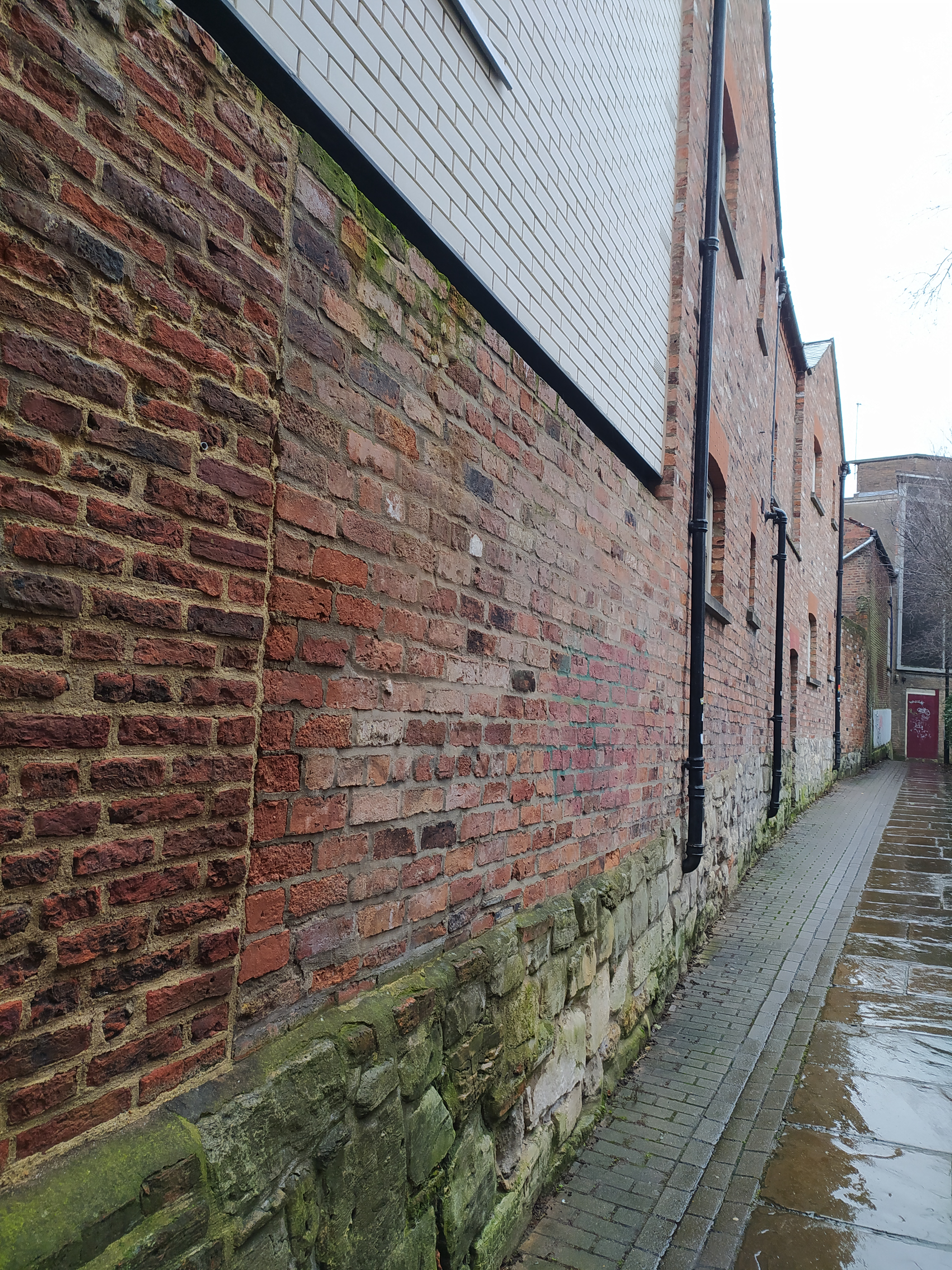
Walls on Black Horse Passage, at the rear of Fossgate, showing stonework believed to be part of the friary wall

York Carmelite Friary was a friary in York, North Yorkshire, England, that was established in about 1250, moved to its permanent site in 1295 and was surrendered in 1538.

The original site was on Bootham in York until 1295 when William de Vescy gave the Carmelite friars a tenement in Stonebow Lane which extended as far south as the River Foss and from east to west between the streets of Fossgate and 'Mersk'. Within five years the friary church was under construction followed by the consecration of a cemetery in 1304 and the church in 1328. A royal licence was granted in 1314 that allowed the friars to build a quay on the Fishpond of the Foss and keep a boat that enabled the transporting of building materials. This licence and the gift of additional lands was followed by a number of extensions that took place throughout the 14th century culminating in the rebuilding of the church in 1392 as the friary eventually extended as far east as Hungate. The location of friary land within the parishes of St Crux and St Saviour meant that from 1301 an annual payment to St Saviour's was established following complaints from St Mary's convent to whom the church was appropriated. In 1320 Archbishop Melton stated that annual compensation was to be paid to the rector of St Crux and in 1350 the friary was restricted in the use of its chapel. The chapel, which was located above the gatehouse at the northern end of the friary, contained a life-size statue of the Virgin Mary which attracted many pilgrims, but the friars were made to remove the statue.

The last Prior of the Carmelite friary, Simon Clerkson, was a supporter of the Henrician regime and, after the dissolution, was granted the vicarage of Rotherham. The friary was surrendered to Sir George Lawson in 1538 after which the site was leased to a Ralph Beckwith in 1540 and his family held the land until 1614. A few monuments and architectural fragments from the friary are in the collection of the Yorkshire Museum in York. The location of the friary can be found on several historical maps up to 1852 including Speed's map of 1610 and Baines of 1822, however the modern street pattern has significantly changed. The friary has been completely built over, however it is thought that the limestone masonry incorporated into buildings on the site may have been from the walls of the friary. In the 1990s the public house (since renamed The Terrace) on the corner of Fossgate and Stonebow was called the Northern Wall in reference to its location on the site of the former friary.

In 1995, the Carmelites returned to work in York when they were invited by the Diocese of Middlesbrough to be chaplains at More House to the University of York. In 2021 Oratorian of the Oratory Church of Saint Wilfrid assumed responsibility for the Catholic Chaplaincy.

== Burials ==
- Thomas Bardolf, 5th Baron Bardolf
- John Kiningham, Carmelite prior at York
- John Polestead, Carmelite prior at York
