= 68 and 70 Walmgate =

Listed building in York, England

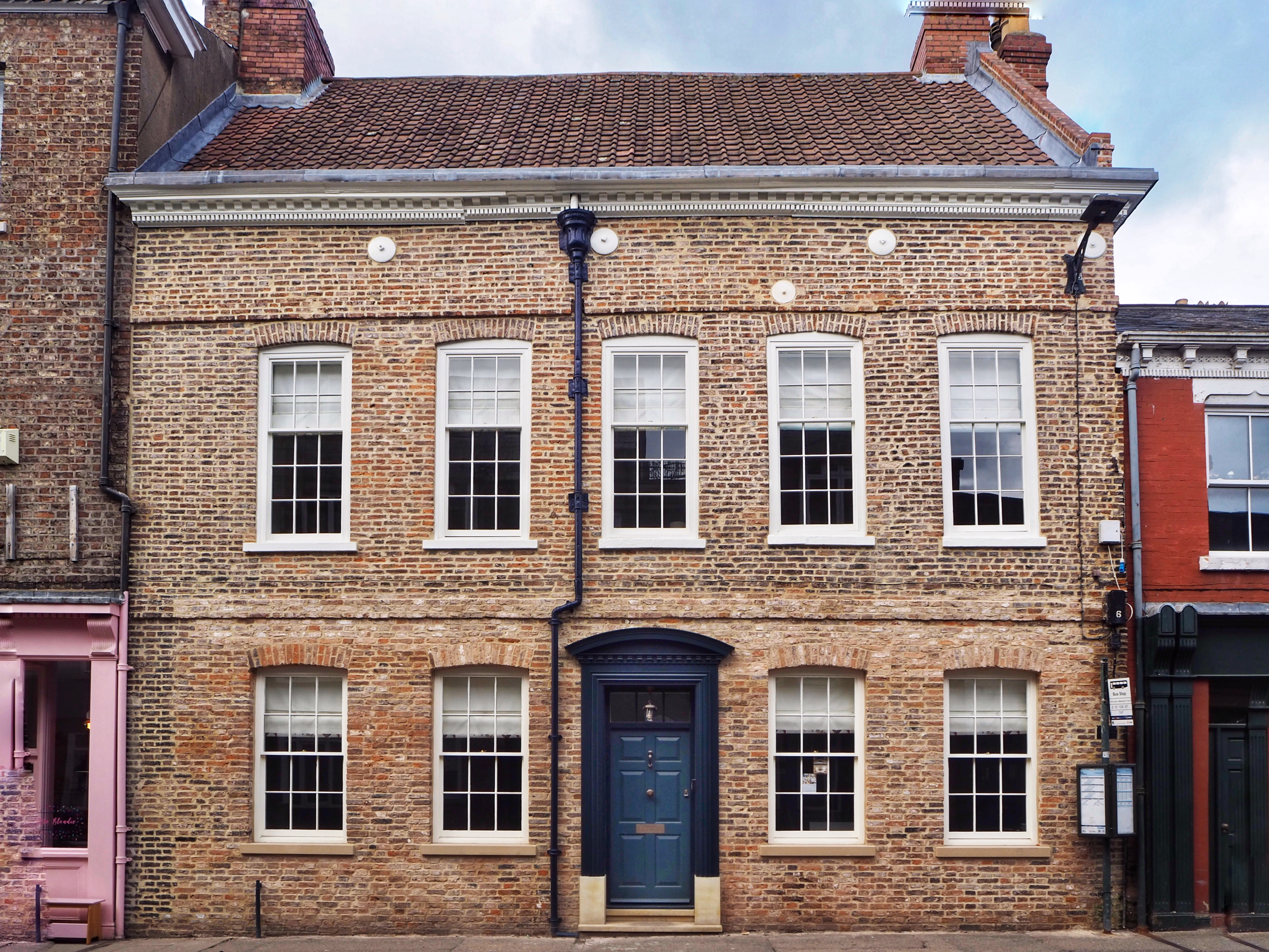
- The building in 2023
- Interactive map of the 68 and 70 Walmgate area

General information
- Status: Converted to holiday accommodation
- Type: Shops (former; originally a house)
- Location: Walmgate, York, England
- Coordinates: 53°57′48″N 1°04′53″W
- Completed: c. 1700; 326 years ago (probably earlier)
- Renovated: c. 1985 (altered); 2021 (converted)

Technical details
- Floor count: 2

Design and construction
- Designations

Listed Building – Grade II*
- Official name: 68 and 70, Walmgate
- Designated: 19 August 1971
- Reference no.: 1256346

Website
- thegeorgiantownhouseyork.co.uk

68 and 70 Walmgate is a historic building in the city centre of York, England.

The house stands on the northeast side of Walmgate. It was constructed in about 1700, although Historic England states that it probably has earlier origins; some of the roof timbers are medieval. It was a large house, with four bedrooms and servants' quarters, unusual for the street which had high levels of poverty and several industrial sites. The building was altered in 1783, which may be when it was divided in two, with the ground floor converted to shops. In the mid-19th century, No. 70 was occupied by the vicar of nearby St Margaret's Church. The whole property was purchased by Age Concern in 1985, which converted it into a single shop, with offices above. In 2021, it was converted into a single holiday let, named The Georgian Townhouse. It has been Grade II* listed since 1971.

The house has two storeys, with attics and a cellar. It is five bays wide, and is constructed of orange brick with a pantile roof. There are five upper floor windows, the wall above set slightly further forward. There is a drainpipe with the date 1783. In plan, the first floor has two large rooms at the front and two smaller rooms with a stairwell between at the back, while the servants' staircase is to the left. Original plasterwork survives, as does some panelling and a fireplace.

== See also ==
- Grade II* listed buildings in the City of York
- Listed buildings in York (within the city walls, southern part)
