= Bowes Morrell House =

Listed building in York, England

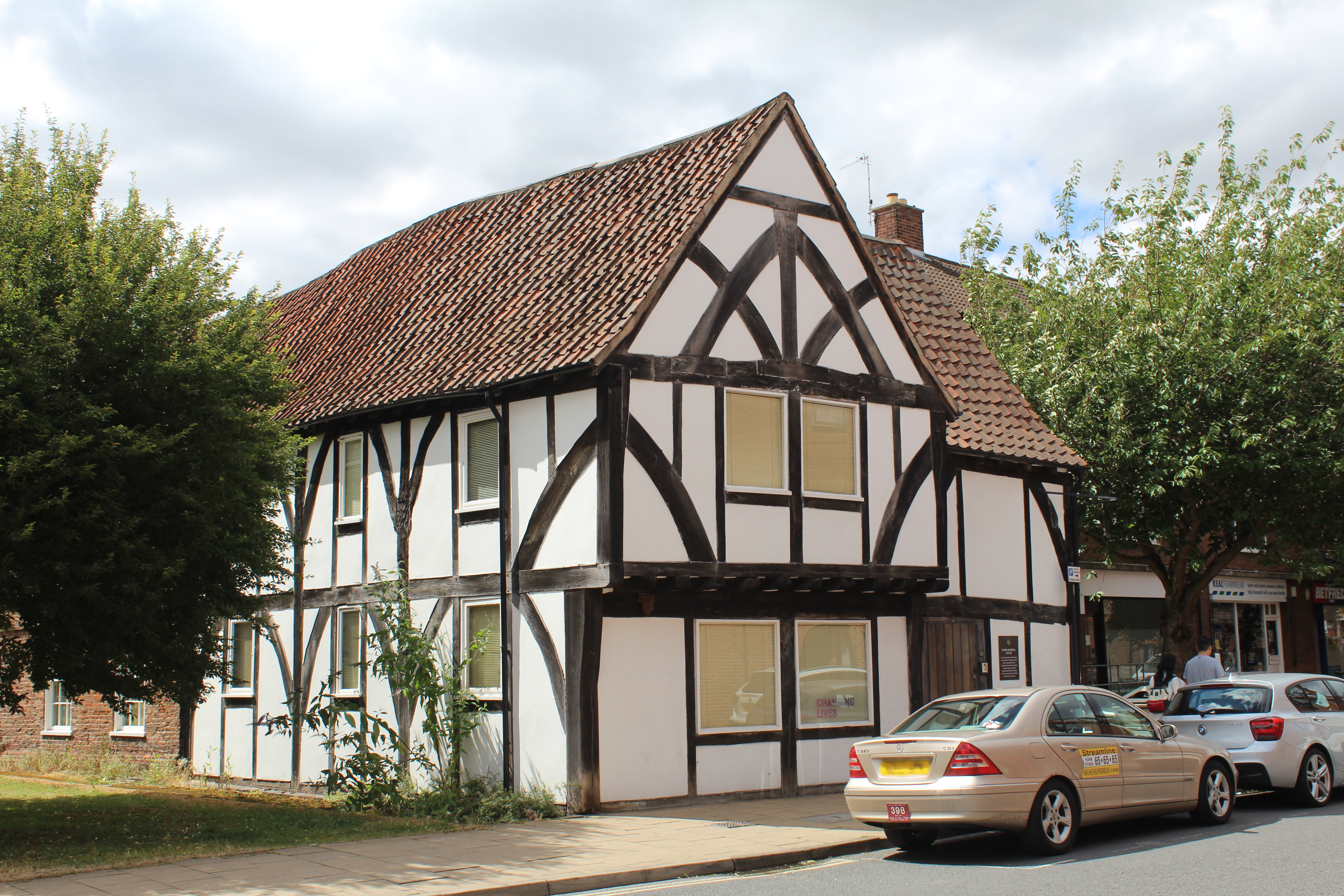
- The house in 2018

- Location within York City Centre

General information
- Location: 111 Walmgate, York, England
- Coordinates: 53.9559°N 1.0732°W
- Year built: c. 1400
- Renovated: 16th, late 17th, and 20th centuries

Technical details
- Material: Timber framed
- Floor count: 2

Design and construction
- Designations

Listed Building – Grade II*
- Official name: Bowes Morrell House
- Designated: 14 June 1954
- Reference no.: 1256310

Website
- Official website

The Bowes Morrell House is a historic building on Walmgate in the city of York, England.

The house was one of four for which a licence was granted in 1396 to construct in the churchyard of St Peter-le-Willows. It may have been used as a vicarage for the church, or alternatively for St Margaret's Church. In later years, the building was a cheap lodging house for travelling workers. By the late 19th century, it was owned by the O'Hara family, bought out by the Kilmartin family in the 1930s. It was nicknamed the "doss house", and had a sign above the door reading "good lodgings down this passage", despite its reputation for poor-quality accommodation.

The house is timber framed, with two storeys, and originally had an "L" plan, with the main section being a hall 20 feet (6.1 m) long and 10 feet 6 inches (3 m) wide. An extension was built in the 16th century, giving the building a square plan. In the late 17th century, a further extension was added in brick to the south end of the original building, while the current second floor over the hall dates from the 18th century. The crown post roof survives, as does much of its timber framing, although some has been renewed.

The house was partially restored in 1932. In 1954, it was Grade II* listed, and in 1966, it was bought and more thoroughly restored by the York Civic Trust. It renamed the building after John Bowes Morrell, one of its founders. It was later occupied by the Council for British Archaeology. In 2004, it was purchased by the York Conservation Trust, and from 2012 it was occupied by the Cyrenians drug and alcohol rehabilitation charity.

== See also ==
- Grade II* listed buildings in the City of York
- Listed buildings in York (within the city walls, southern part)
