= 9 Walmgate =

Listed former pub in York, England

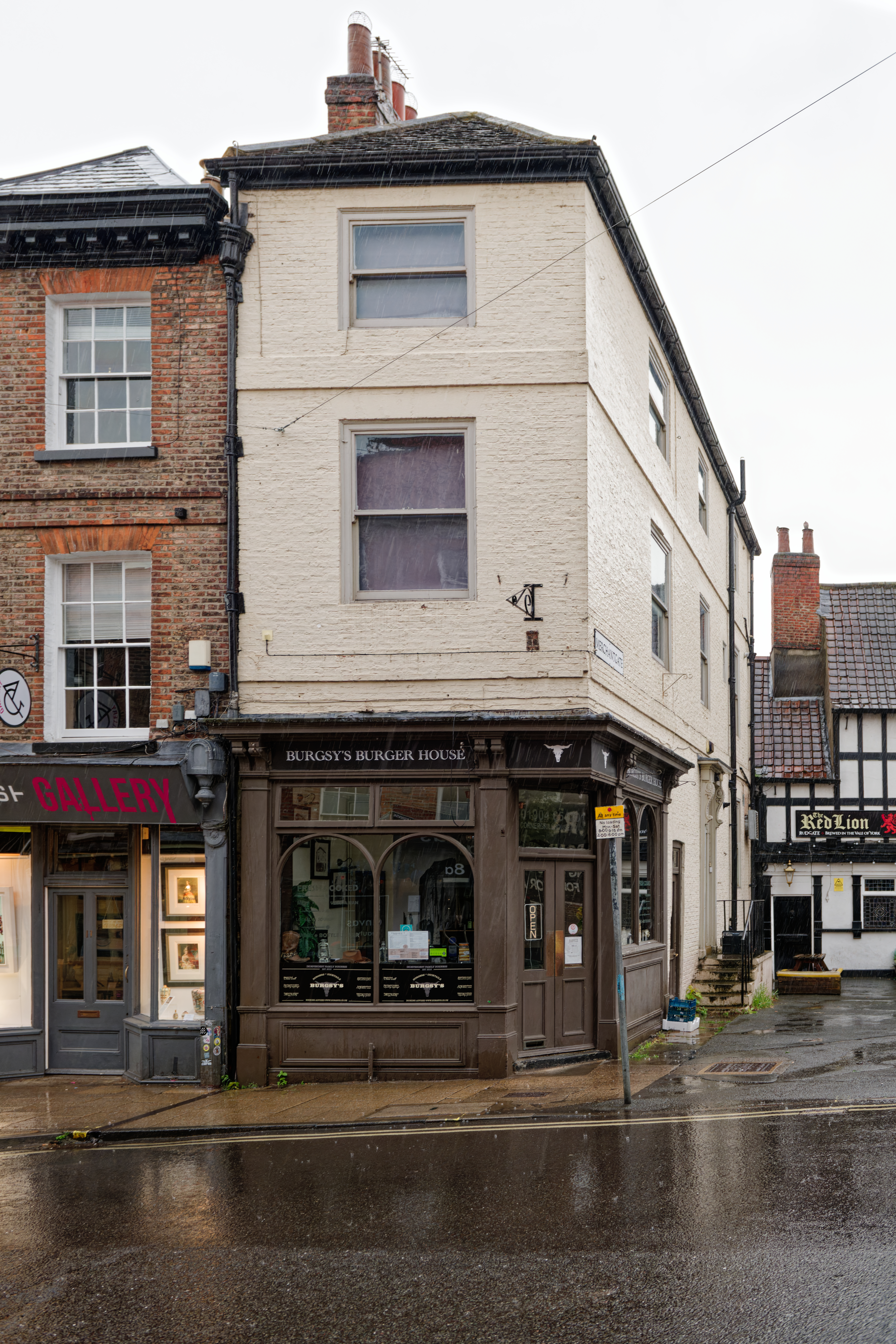
- The building in 2024
- Interactive map of the 9 Walmgate area
- Former names: Black Horse

General information
- Status: Converted to restaurant use
- Type: Public house (former); originally an inn
- Location: Walmgate, York, England
- Coordinates: 53.9573°N 1.0776°W
- Year built: Mid-18th century
- Renovated: Early 19th century (re-roofed); Mid-19th century (altered and shopfront)
- Closed: Early 20th century (as a pub)

Design and construction
- Designations

Listed Building – Grade II
- Official name: 9, Walmgate
- Designated: 19 August 1971
- Reference no.: 1256363

Website
- burgsys.co.uk

9 Walmgate is a Grade II listed former public house on Walmgate in York, England. Recorded in its official listing as having begun as an inn in the mid‑18th century, it was re‑roofed in the early 19th century and altered with a shopfront in the mid‑19th century, by which time it was known as the Black Horse. The building continued to appear as the Black Horse on late‑19th‑century mapping, but had ceased to be shown as a pub by the early 20th century. It now stands between the Grade II-listed Red Lion at No. 7 and Nos. 11–11A, and has housed Burgsy's restaurant since 2023.

== History ==
Standing on Walmgate, the building is recorded in its official listing as having begun as an inn in the mid-18th century. The RCHME, however, notes that No. 9 was first built as a house in the late 18th century. It was re-roofed in the early 19th century and altered with a shopfront added in the mid‑19th century, and by 1850 it was known as the Black Horse public house. The 1851 directory of Kingston-upon-Hull and York records Richard Fall at No. 9 but does not mention a pub at the address; five Black Horses are listed, none with an address on Walmgate. However, the Ordnance Survey map surveyed in 1851 and published the following year shows the premises.

The 1885 directory for York lists Joseph Robinson, a horse breaker, at the Black Horse Inn at No. 9, and it appears on the 1891 Ordnance Survey map. The 1913 Kelly's Directory of the North and East Ridings of Yorkshire contains no entry for No. 9, although neighbouring properties are listed. The building no longer had the public house designation by the 1931 Ordnance Survey map.

In 1968 the site was included within the newly established Central Historic Core conservation area, and on 19 August 1971, No. 9 was designated a Grade II listed building. It stands between the Red Lion pub at No. 7 and Nos. 11–11A, both also Grade II listed. Previously occupied by the Corner Grill House, No. 9 has been the home of Burgsy's restaurant since 2023.

== Architecture ==
The front is finished in painted brick, with a timber doorway and shopfront. The roof is hipped and covered in a mix of tiles and pantiles, with decorative corner scrolls, a skylight, and brick chimneys.

Entrance to No. 9 in 2025

The building has three storeys and a single window bay. The shopfront is formed by plain uprights with simple moulded details at the top and a shaped cornice supported on paired brackets. At the corner are glazed and panelled double doors with a small window above, set between shop windows made up of two round‑arched lights with a horizontal bar above and panelled bases below. The upper floors each have single‑pane sash windows set under painted flat heads. Narrow horizontal bands mark the first and second floors, continuing around the right‑hand corner. A fluted rainwater head hangs at the eaves.

The right side, facing Merchantgate, is also three storeys, with a cellar beneath the right end and three window bays. The cellar has a simple boarded door. The main doorway, reached by steps, has panelled sides and a shallow entablature supported on carved brackets, with a glazed and panelled door and a six‑pane window above it. The windows match those on the Walmgate front.

== See also ==
- Listed buildings in York (within the city walls, southern part)
