= The Red Lion, York =

Listed pub in York, England

The Red Lion
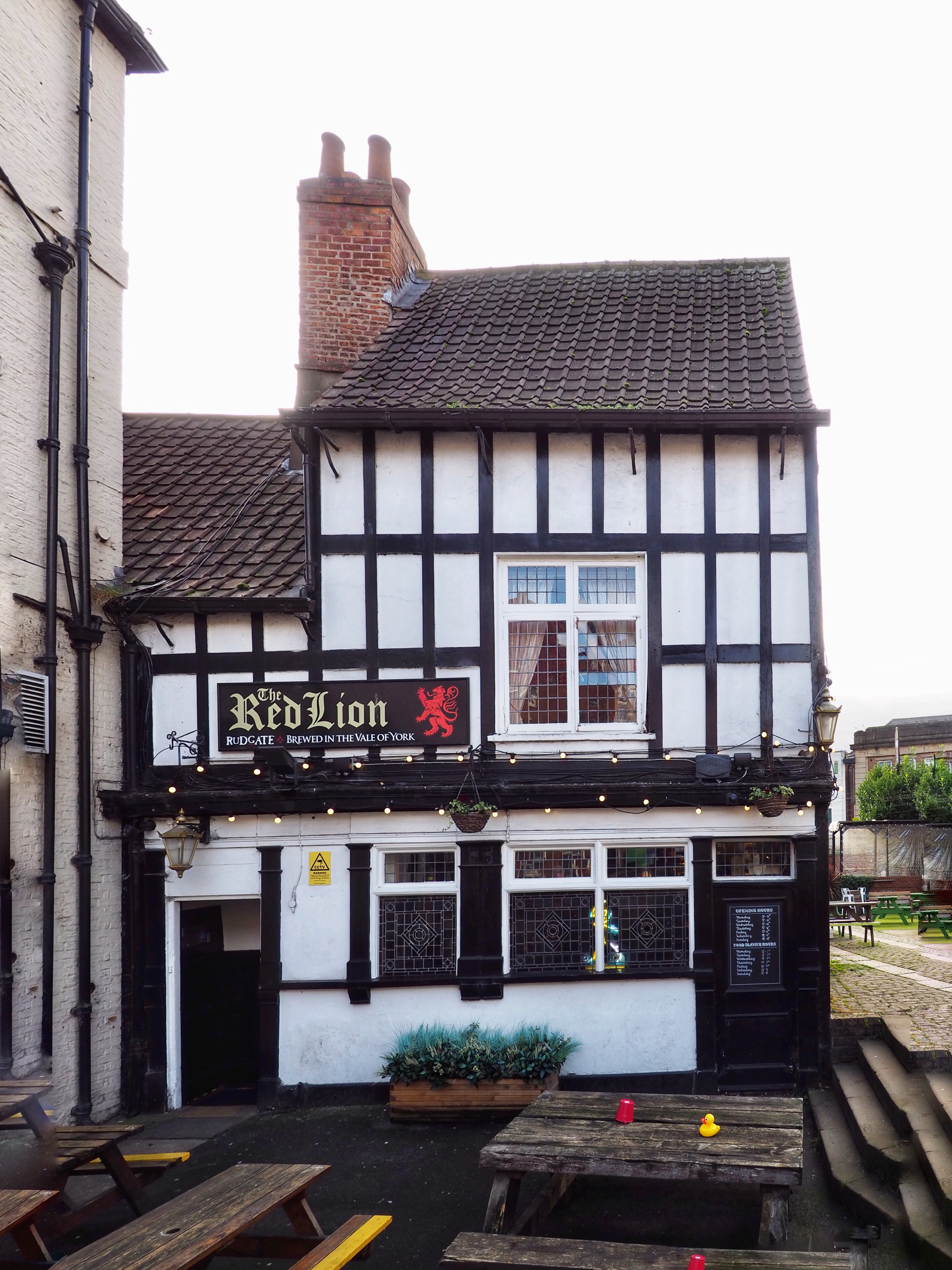
- The pub in 2023, viewed from Walmgate

General information
- Type: Public house; originally a house
- Location: 7 Walmgate, York, England
- Coordinates: 53.957274°N 1.077697°W
- Year built: 15th century
- Renovated: Late 16th century (extended); 17th century (wing); 18th century (extended); Mid-19th century (inn front); 20th century (fenestration)

Listed Building – Grade II
- Official name: The Red Lion public house and attached outbuildings
- Designated: 1 July 1968
- Reference no.: 1256359

The Red Lion is a Grade II listed pub on Walmgate in the city centre of York, England. It is claimed that it is the oldest building in the city used as a pub, however it has only been licensed since the 19th century. A legend claims that Dick Turpin once escaped through the pub's window.

== History ==
The building was originally a house in the 15th century. There is a bread oven in the front bar, which the pub claims dates from the 13th century, and on these grounds, it claims to be the city's oldest pub. However, the building only officially became a licensed pub in the 19th century. It was originally named The Three Cups, however the name was changed in 1805 to avoid confusion with another pub nearby with that same name on Foss Bridge.

The pub claims that highwayman Dick Turpin once escaped through a window of the pub. However, there is no evidence that Turpin ever visited the Red Lion.

In the 19th century, the pub was located behind the Black Horse pub and was set back from the street, accessible only through Walmgate. In 1912, the street of Merchantgate was constructed immediately north of the pub to connect Walmgate with the newly built Piccadilly street and improved access to the pub.

The pub was designated a Grade II listed building on 14 June 1954. It stands next to No. 9, also Grade II listed and formerly the Black Horse pub.

== Architecture ==
The original part of the building is to the north-east, built in the 15th century as a house with a first floor hall and other rooms below, although it was built on 13th-century foundations. It appears to have been truncated at the north-west end, and is now one-and-a-half bays long. The south-eastern end of the building was rebuilt around 1600, and an attic was also inserted. In the 17th century, a lower wing was added to the south-west, in two stages, with a ground floor of brick. There were further extensions in the 18th century, and a new front was added in the 19th century.

The building is timber framed, but has been largely reconstructed over the years. The windows are 20th century. On the first floor, there is an access between two bedrooms, linked to the chimney, which has been described as a priest hole.

== Gallery ==
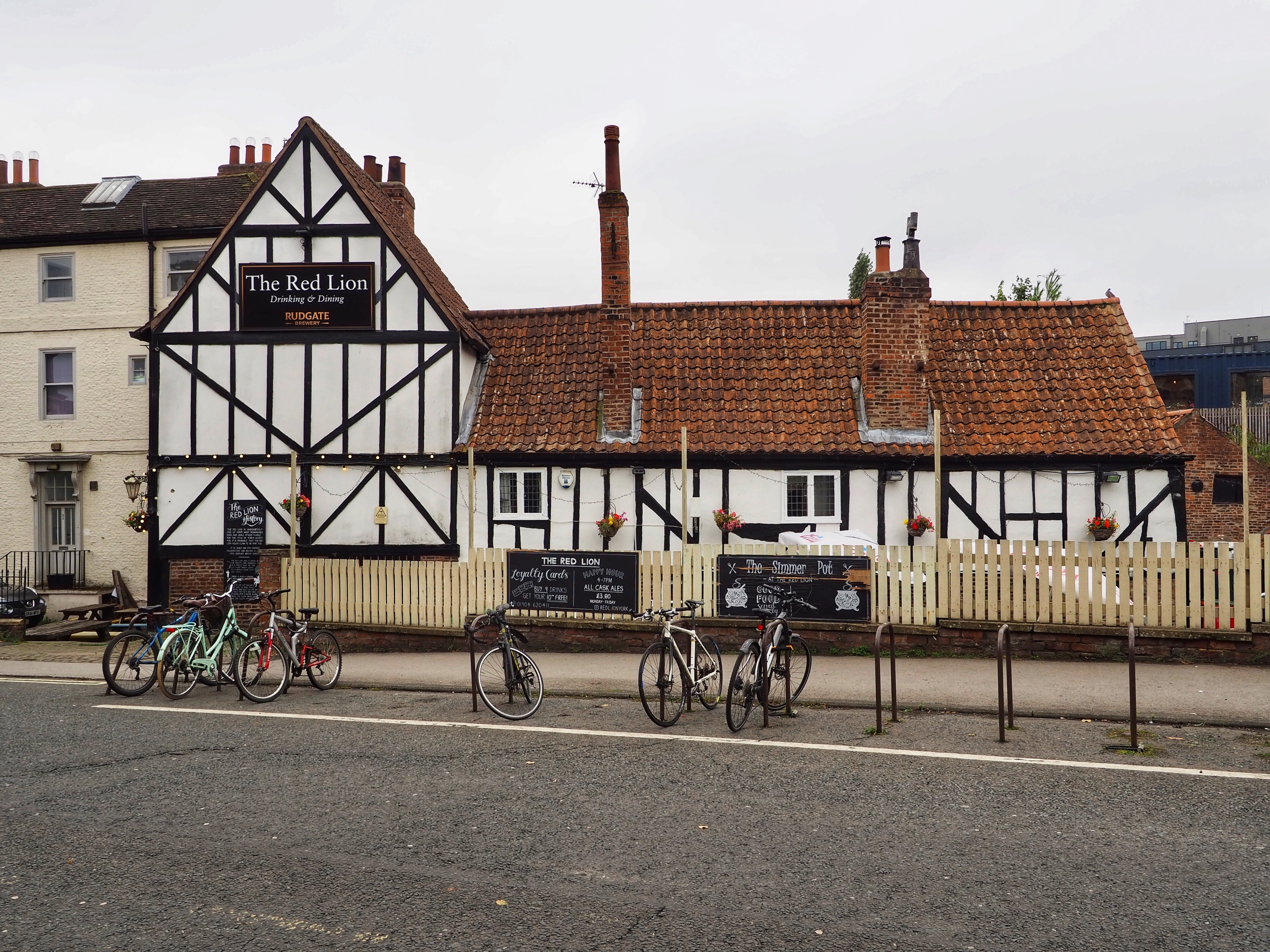
The pub in 2024, viewed from Merchantgate

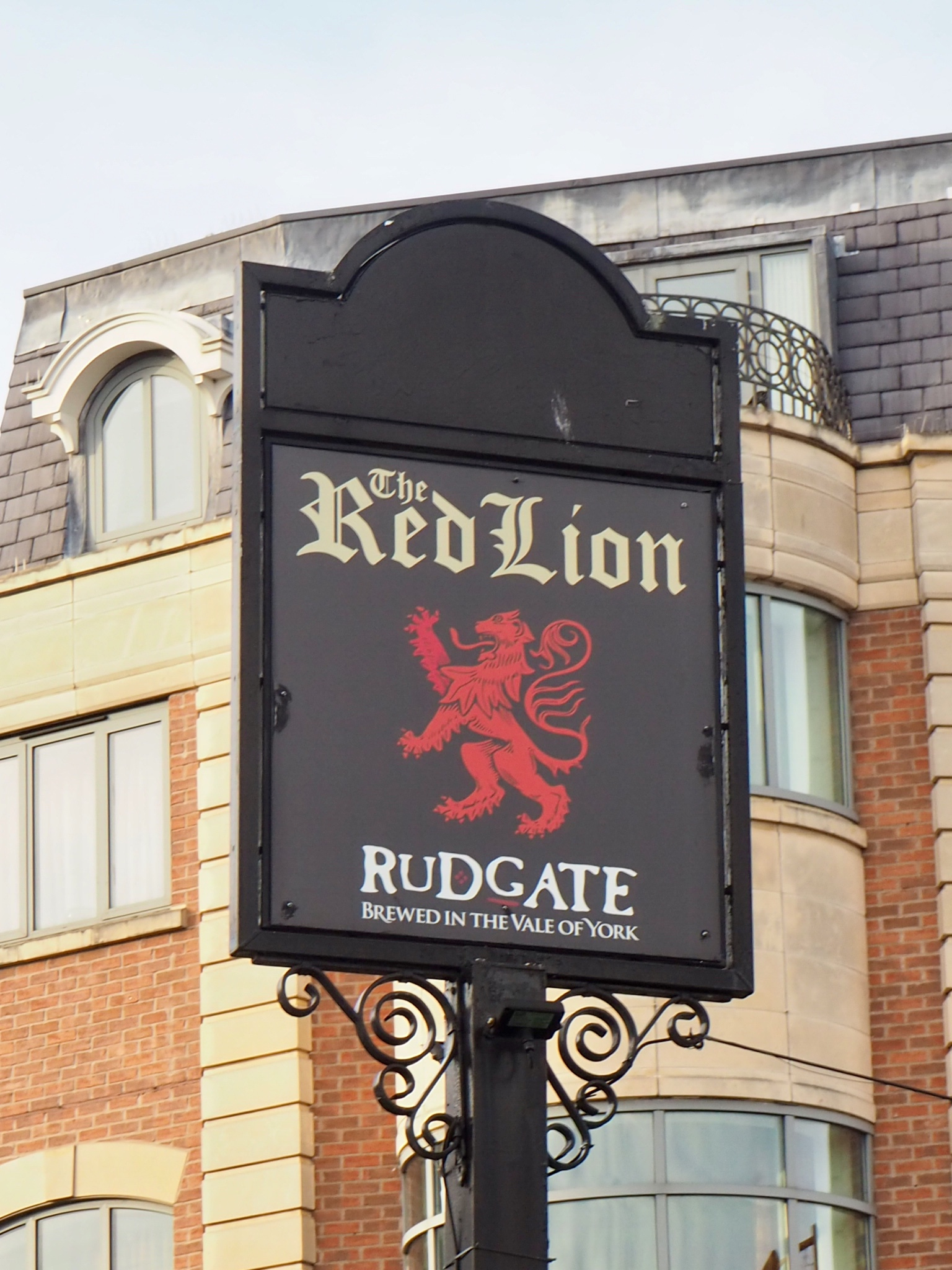
The pub sign

== See also ==
- Listed buildings in York (within the city walls, southern part)
