= 25 Walmgate =

Listed pub in York, England

- The building in 2025
- Interactive map of the 25 Walmgate area
- Alternative names: Walmgate Ale House; Chopping Block

General information
- Status: Converted to public house and restaurant
- Type: Shop (former; originally a house)
- Location: Walmgate, York, England
- Coordinates: 53.9572°N 1.0770°W
- Year built: Late 17th century
- Renovated: Late 19th century (front part re-roofed; shopfront)

Design and construction
- Designations

Listed Building – Grade II
- Official name: 25, Walmgate
- Designated: 19 August 1971
- Reference no.: 1256377

Website
- thechoppingblock.co.uk

25 Walmgate, now trading as the Walmgate Ale House, is a Grade II listed public house on Walmgate in York, England. Originating as a late‑17th‑century house later adapted for commercial use, it was refronted in the late 19th century and further altered thereafter. The building has housed various trades, and since 2001 has undergone successive rebrandings, becoming Walmgate Ale House and Bistro in 2014 and, from 2018, incorporating the Chopping Block restaurant on its upper floors.

== History ==
The building is a late‑17th‑century house on Walmgate that was later adapted for commercial use. Its front section was re‑roofed in the late 19th century, when a new shopfront was added, and further alterations were made afterwards.

The 1851 directory of Kingston-upon-Hull and York records Robert Thackeray at No. 25. The Historic Environment Record (HER) entry for the building states that the present No. 25 was formerly the Duke of York public house. The Ordnance Survey map surveyed in 1851 and published the following year shows the building between the entrances to Barleycorn Yard and Duke of York Passage, in the position corresponding to the present No. 25. However, the same mapping, together with directory evidence, places the Duke of York at the neighbouring No. 23, indicating that the HER record has attributed the former pub to the wrong address.

The 1885 directory for York lists Benjamin Oxtoby, a saddler, at No. 25. The 1913 Kelly's Directory of the North and East Ridings of Yorkshire records the harness makers Robinson & Co at the same address.

In 1968 the site was included within the newly established Central Historic Core conservation area, and on 19 August 1971, No. 25 was designated a Grade II listed building. It stands next to Nos. 19–23, also Grade II listed.

Local press has described the building as long associated with Ellerker's saddlers and rope‑makers, a business reputed to have supplied hangman's nooses to York Prison, stating that it traded until around 2000, although 19th‑century directories record other occupants at the address. Archaeological investigation carried out in July 2001 identified medieval occupation, later post‑medieval service buildings, and successive 18th and 19th‑century workshops and houses behind the street frontage, indicating continuous redevelopment of the rear plots.

In November 2001 it opened as Melton's Too restaurant, was rebranded in 2014 as Walmgate Ale House and Bistro after a major refurbishment, and since 2018 has operated as the Chopping Block on the upper floors, serving Anglo‑French dishes and Yorkshire produce while retaining the ground‑floor ale house.

== Architecture ==
The front of the building is painted brick, while the rear is built in orange brick. The shopfront is made of timber with small cast‑iron columns, and the roof is covered in pantiles with a rebuilt brick chimney. The front gable has decorative bargeboards with hanging finials, and the rear gable is finished with brick coping.

Frontage in 2025

The front has two storeys plus an attic, with two windows set beneath a gable. The shopfront is framed by pilasters with recessed panels and a dentilled cornice supported on paired carved brackets, ending in a spiked ball finial on a pedestal. The shop door is glazed and panelled with an overlight, flanked by two half‑canted two‑light shop windows above panelled bases. A glazed passage door stands at the right end. The first‑floor windows are single‑pane sashes, and the attic has a Yorkshire sash with two rows of 12 panes. All are set beneath blocked elliptical arches.

The rear also has two storeys and an attic. To the left is a segmental arch leading to a passage, next to a 16‑pane sash; above is a single‑pane sash, both set under blocked elliptical arches. The attic has a casement with two rows of six panes beneath a moulded brick pediment. Raised brick bands run across the building at first‑floor and attic level.

=== Interior ===
Inside, a timber staircase rises from the ground floor to the first, with shaped detailing on its sides, rounded balusters, square posts and a moulded handrail. The front room on the first floor has a fireplace with a projecting surround and shelf, and a small two‑panel cupboard door on the left hung on early hinges. Above, the roof structure is boarded over, but the front truss still shows its upright posts and base pieces.

== See also ==
- Listed buildings in York (within the city walls, southern part)
