= Rose and Crown, York =

Listed pub in York, England

Rose and Crown
- The pub in 2024
- Interactive map of the Rose and Crown area

General information
- Type: Public house (originally houses)
- Location: 13 Lawrence Street, York, England
- Coordinates: 53.9550°N 1.0695°W
- Year built: Early 18th century
- Renovated: 19th and 20th century (altered); 2013 (refurbished)
- Owner: Heineken UK

Design and construction
- Designations

Listed Building – Grade II
- Official name: Rose and Crown public house
- Designated: 4 January 1996
- Reference no.: 1257497

Website
- roseandcrownyork.com

The Rose and Crown is a Grade II listed public house, restaurant, and bed-and-breakfast on Lawrence Street in York, England. It occupies two early‑18th‑century houses later altered in the 19th and 20th centuries, and the earliest known reference to the pub dates from 1786. The site was included in the Central Historic Core conservation area in 1968, and as of August 2025 the freehold is owned by Heineken UK.

== History ==
=== 18th–19th century ===
The public house occupies two early‑18th‑century houses on Lawrence Street, which were altered in the 19th and 20th centuries. The earliest known reference to the Rose and Crown as a pub appears in the York Courant in 1786.

In the early 19th century the Rose and Crown was run by William Clarke, who appears in the 1818 and 1823 directories under taverns and alehouses, showing it was not classed as an inn. At that time the street was still known as Walmgate‑bar‑Without. By the late 1820s the licence briefly passed to William Armitage, and by 1830 it was held by Sarah Mickle, listed as a victualler; the street had by then become Lawrence Street, with the Rose and Crown at No. 7. The adjoining house at No. 6 was occupied by Elizabeth Hawkins. The 1852 city map is the first to show the layout in detail, with the frontage divided into two separate premises, reflecting the two original houses. The pub occupied the eastern part, with rear ranges extending behind the neighbouring property.

By the 1861 census the landlord was William Sturdy. The census and later 19th‑century mapping indicate that the two former houses had been combined by this point, though the property was later divided again. When the Rose and Crown was advertised for sale in 1869 it included a brewhouse, which may have been used for brewing or for domestic hot‑water work; it was likely located in one of the rear ranges that no longer survive. In 1871 the only resident recorded was the landlord, Jacob Mitchell.

=== 20th century–present ===
A report in 1902 described the pub as having two smoke rooms, a tap room, a club room and a kitchen on the ground floor, with a sitting room, nursery and five bedrooms, including two for travellers, on the first floor, along with attics and cellars. Ordnance Survey plans from the 1930s show additions to both rear yard ranges, leaving most of the plot built over. By 1938 the entrance from Lawrence Street had been widened by removing the southern end of the long east range, likely to improve access. The northern part of that range had been demolished by 1965, and although the whole frontage belonged to the pub, renumbered as No. 13, part of the western side was again, or still, a separate dwelling at 11A Lawrence Street.

In 1968 the site was included within the newly established Central Historic Core conservation area, and on 4 January 1996, the Rose and Crown was designated a Grade II listed building. It was formerly a Tetley Ale House and at one time had its own brewery, but the source does not give dates for when this occurred.

In May 2012, Punch Taverns sought listed building consent to build a two‑storey block of 14 guest bedrooms on the land used for car parking behind the Rose and Crown; the application was later withdrawn. A related planning application for a building with "12 letting bedrooms" was approved in October 2012. The pub underwent internal refurbishment in 2013. In May 2015, a further proposal was submitted for a two-storey building containing 12 hotel bedrooms, and approval was granted by City of York Council in September that year. Archaeological investigations carried out in connection with the scheme revealed well‑preserved Roman and medieval deposits, including surfaces associated with the Roman road and later occupation layers. The approved building was not taken forward. As of June 2025, the freehold is owned by Heineken UK.

== Architecture ==
Entrance detail in 2018

The building has painted render and a pantiled roof. It has two storeys and five bays. The windows have simple painted surrounds; those on the ground floor are mid‑20th‑century casements with leaded panes, while the first‑floor windows are sash types with glazing bars and horns. Between the second and third bays is a doorway framed by Doric pilasters with a pediment, a plain rectangular light above, and a six‑panelled door. A moulded gutter cornice runs along the front. The gables are finished with coping stones, and there are chimneys on the left gable and behind the ridge between the third and fourth bays.

=== Interior ===
The inside has been modernised several times, which has obscured earlier room arrangements and later changes. One notable feature is a large glazed panel set horizontally within a lightwell to form a ceiling over part of the ground floor; it appears to date from the later 19th or early 20th century.

== See also ==
- Listed buildings in York (outside the city walls, southern part)
