= Lawrence Street (York) =

Street in York, England

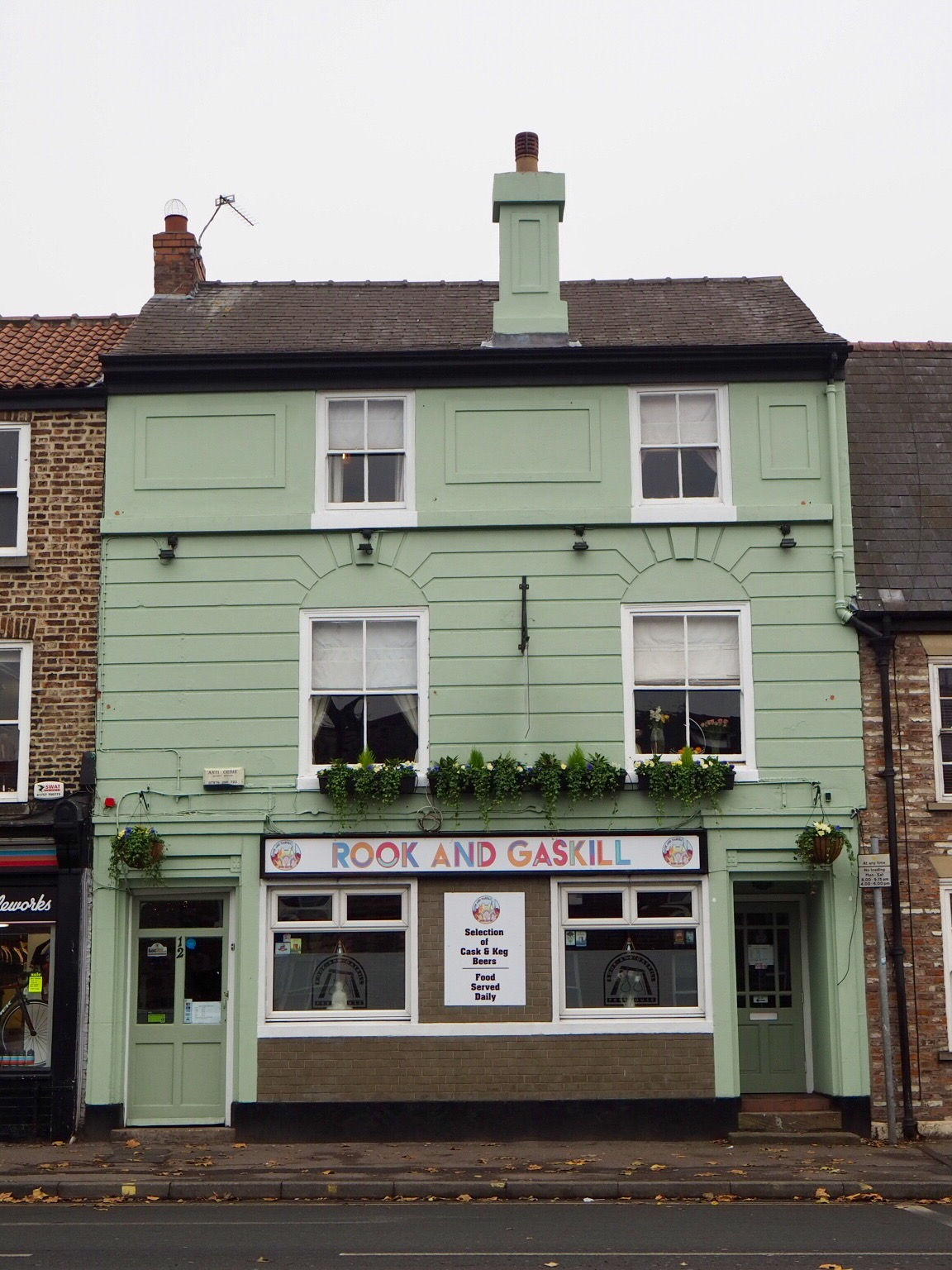
- The Rook and Gaskill pub
- Location within York
- Location: York, England
- Postal code: YO
- Coordinates: 53.9545°N 1.0661°W
- West end: Walmgate; Foss Islands Road; Barbican Road
- East end: Hull Road; Olympian Court

Lawrence Street is a road in York, England, immediately south-east of the city centre.

== History ==
A Bronze Age cremation urn has been found in excavations by Lawrence Street, the only prehistoric remains discovered in central York. The street was originally constructed as a Roman road, but there is no evidence of Roman occupation in the area, only pottery shards and possible signs of a clay quarry, the area otherwise being used as farmland.

There was some Anglo-Saxon building along the street, extending out from Walmgate. The Normans built an earthwork across the line of the street, and in the 12th century Walmgate Bar was constructed on it. In the 14th century the York city walls were extended over the earthwork, with Lawrence Street remaining entirely outside. St Edward the Martyr Church was built immediately outside Walmgate Bar, and St Lawrence's Church also existed by the 12th century. In 1142, St Nicholas's Hospital was built on the street, with its chapel used as a further parish church.

The street was heavily damaged during the Siege of York: Royalist defenders burned down the timber buildings to create a clear area outside the city walls, while Parliamentarians set up a battery in St Lawrence's churchyard. In 1798, John Dodsworth opened a school on the street, operating until 1888. In 1822, York Quarterly Meeting School was opened on the street, moving in 1846 to become Bootham School. In 1881, St Lawrence was demolished, other than its tower, and replaced by a new church.

During the 19th century, the area surrounding the street was built up and became largely industrial, with a large timber yard and brickworks. Today the road is the westernmost stretch of the A1079, from York to Hull. The City of York Council describes the road as "a traffic dominated street of eroded historic character and poor quality modern development".

== Layout and architecture ==
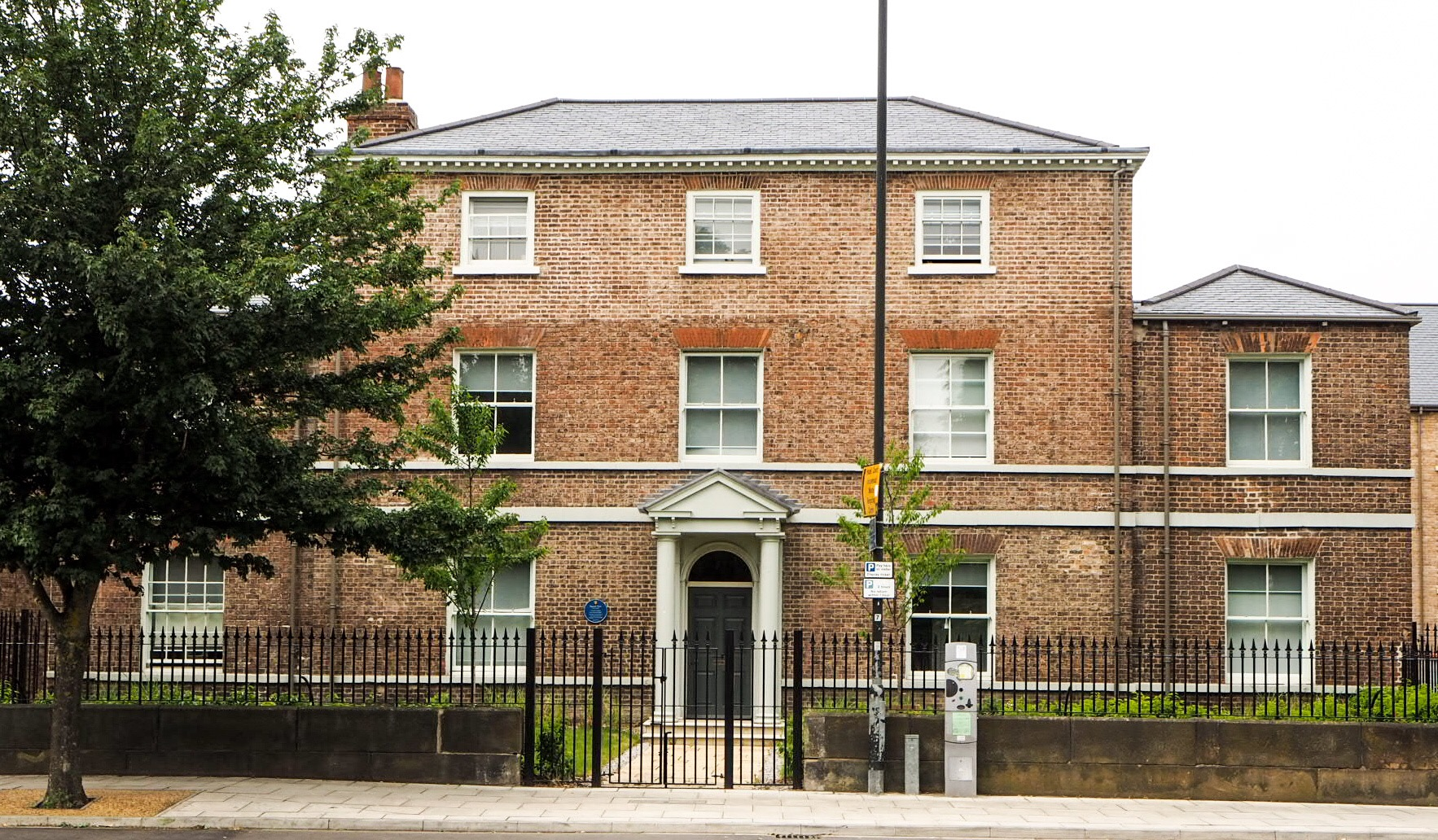
Tuke House

The street runs east from the junction of Walmgate, Foss Islands Road and Barbican Road, to become Hull Road at its junction with Olympian Court. On the north side, it has junctions with Leake Street, James Street, Granville Terrace, Landsdowne Terrace, Nicholas Street, Milton Street, Bull Lane and Manor Court. On the south side, its junctions are with The Tannery, Regent Street, Farrar Street, Nicholas Gardens and St Nicholas Place.

Notable buildings on the south side of the road include the Ellen Wilson Cottages, former almshouses at Nos. 1–6; the late-17th and early-19th-century Nos. 8–10; the Rook and Gaskill at No. 12, built as a pub about 1840; Nos. 14–18, an early-19th-century terrace; St Lawrence's Church; the former St Joseph's Convent, designed by George Goldie in 1870; the former Sisters of Mercy Convent, a community of Corpus Christi Carmelites; No. 30, a former mill built around 1804; and the early-19th-century Nos. 102–104.

On the north side are the Rose and Crown pub at No. 13, built as two cottages in the early 18th century; No. 17 and the Waggon and Horses pub at No. 19, built in 1773; Nos. 21–23, and St Lawrence Working Men's Club at Nos. 29–31, both built in the late 18th century; Tuke House, built for Samuel Tuke in the late 18th century; the early-19th-century No. 61; Nos. 63–65 from about 1900; and Nos. 85–87 and No. 93, all built about 1830.
