= York Minster Lamp Standard =

Grade II listed structure in York, England

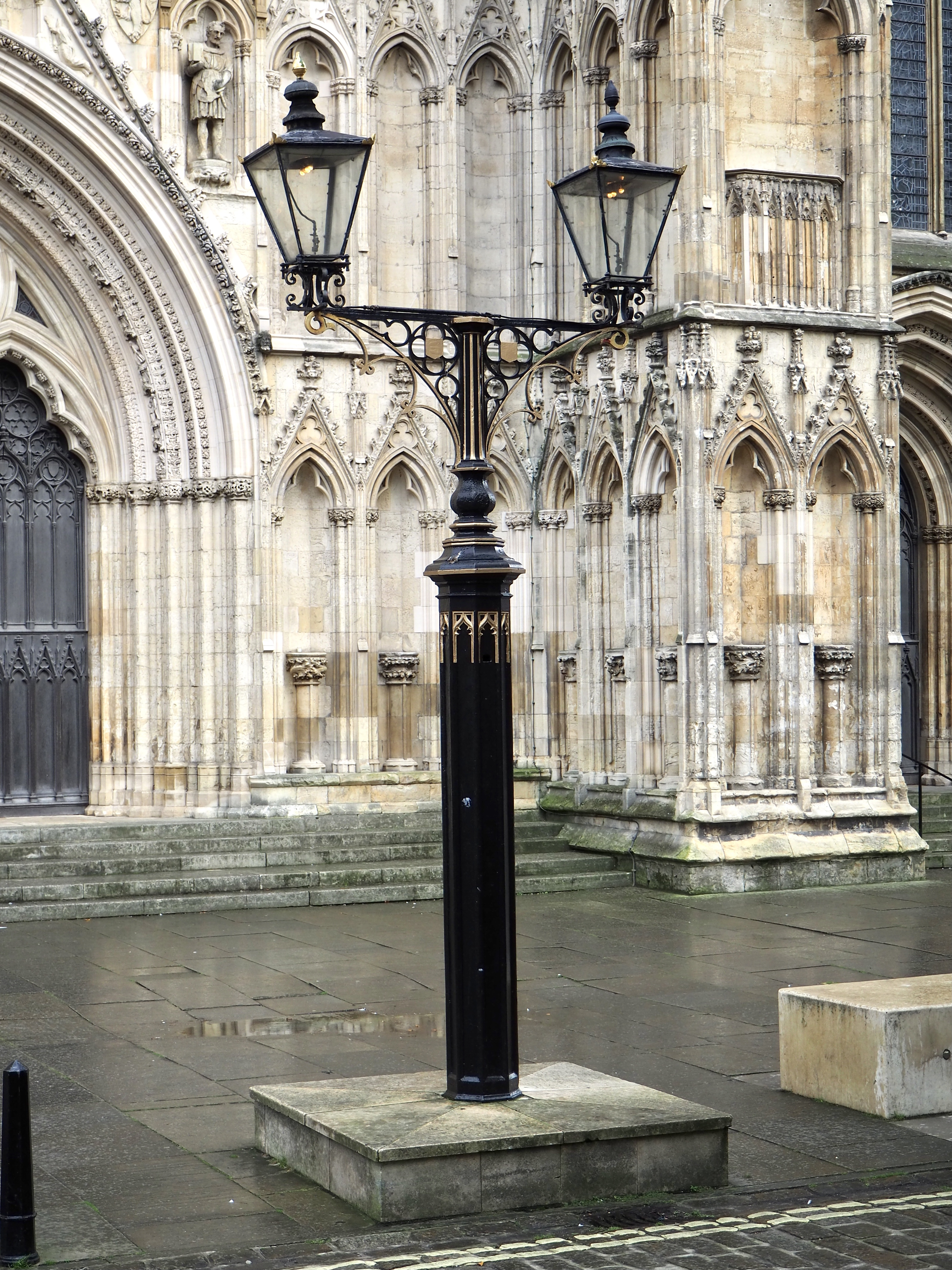
- The lamp in 2020
- Location: Minster Yard, York, England
- OS grid: SE6023752180
- Coordinates: 53°57′44″N 1°05′00″W
- Constructed: 1860s
- Construction: cast iron
- Heritage: Grade II listed building

York Minster Lamp Standard is a lamp standard located a short distance in front of the main entrances to York Minster. It is a Grade II-listed structure, erected around 1860.

The lamp was manufactured by York's Walker Iron Foundry in Walmgate. It is made of cast iron and features an octagonal column with trefoil-headed panelled sides, surmounted by a tapering octagonal shaft on a moulded pedestal. It has a plain crossbar and cusped, traceried spandrels. Its two lanterns are square and tapering, with acorn finials.

== Night view ==
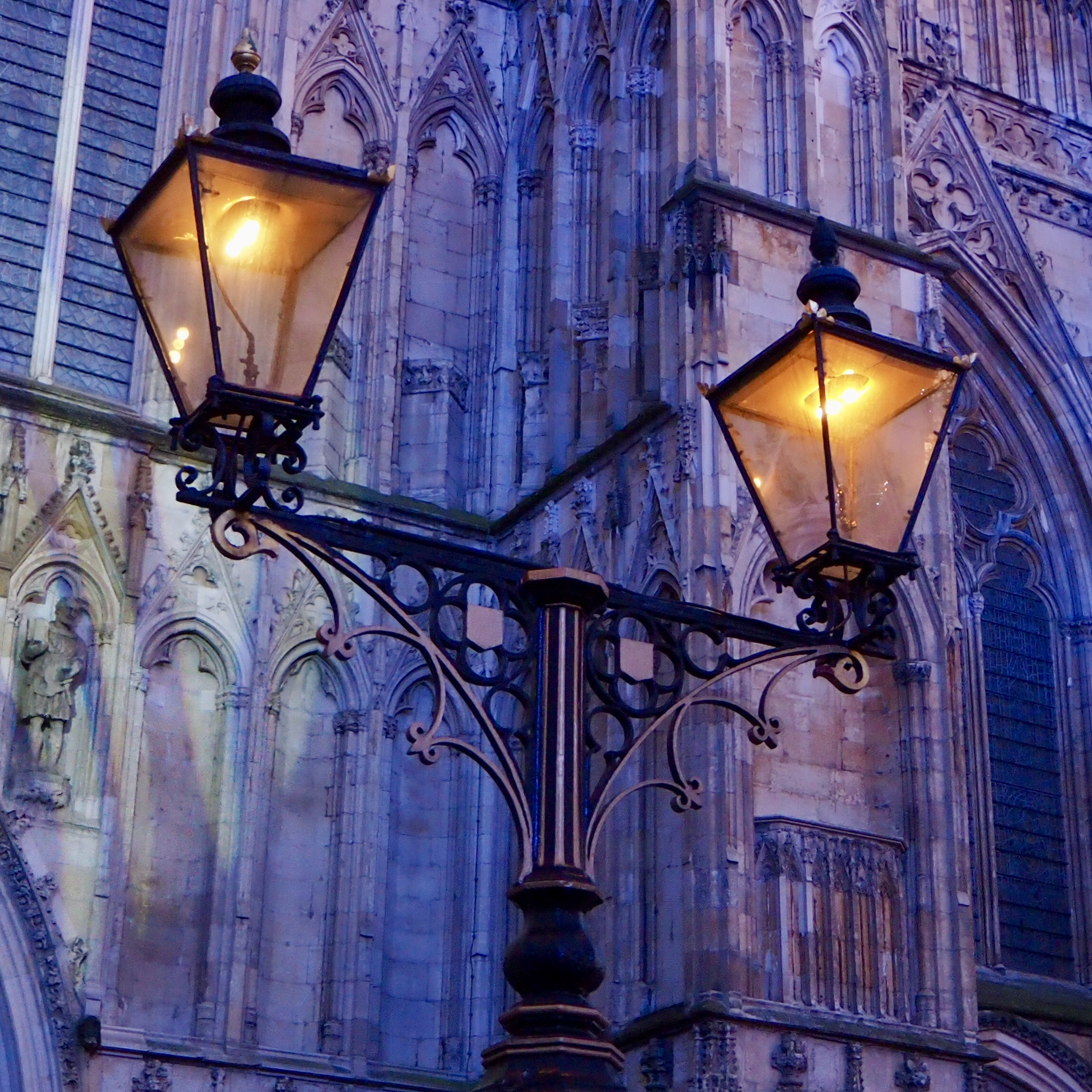
