= 19–23 Walmgate =

Listed terrace in York, England

- The terrace in 2025; No. 19 is on the right
- Interactive map of the 19–23 Walmgate area
- Former names: Duke of York (No. 23); Mawson's Pet Foods

General information
- Status: Mixed commercial and residential uses
- Type: Terrace of former houses; later commercial premises
- Location: Walmgate, York, England
- Coordinates: 53.9572°N 1.0770°W
- Years built: Late 17th and early 18th century
- Renovated: Late 19th century (refronted; shopfronts of Nos. 21–23); 20th century (altered; shopfront of No. 19)

Design and construction
- Designations

Listed Building – Grade II
- Official name: 19, 21 and 23, Walmgate
- Designated: 14 March 1997
- Reference no.: 1256371

19–23 Walmgate is a Grade II listed terrace on Walmgate in York, England. Built as three houses in the late 17th and early 18th centuries, it was refronted in the late 19th century and altered in the 20th, with No. 19 given a 20th‑century shopfront and Nos. 21 and 23 retaining late‑19th‑century ones. The terrace has had a variety of occupants, including the Duke of York public house at No. 23 in the 19th century and long‑running businesses operated by the Mawson family, whose final enterprise, Mawson's Pet Foods, closed in 2000. Today No. 19 houses the Japanese restaurant Shiitakeya, while Nos. 21–23 are occupied by the bubble‑tea store Mooboo.

== History ==
The terrace on Walmgate originally comprised three houses, dating from the late 17th and early 18th centuries. It was refronted in the late 19th century and altered in the 20th; No. 19 has a 20th‑century shopfront, while Nos. 21 and 23 retain late‑19th‑century shopfronts.

The 1851 directory of Kingston-upon-Hull and York records Thomas Masterman and a post-office receiving house at No. 21, and Daniel Linfoot at No. 23; there is no entry for No. 19. The Ordnance Survey map surveyed in 1851 and published the following year shows the Duke of York public house, in the position corresponding to the present No. 23. The 1885 directory for York lists James Mawson, a baker and provision dealer, at No. 19, the saddler Frank Johnson at No. 21, and Mrs Mary Crow at the Duke of York Inn at No. 23. The inn appears on the 1891 Ordnance Survey map. The 1913 Kelly's Directory of the North and East Ridings of Yorkshire records the corn dealer James Mawson at Nos. 19–21, and William Hesp, a machinery broker, at No. 23, indicating that the Duke of York had closed by this date.

In 1968 the site was included within the newly established Central Historic Core conservation area, and on 14 March 1997, Nos. 19–23 were designated a Grade II listed building. The terrace stands between No. 17 and No. 25, both also Grade II listed.

The Mawson family traded from Nos. 19–23 for over a century; the final business, Mawson's Pet Foods, closed in 2000. The area behind the terrace was later converted into an apartment complex named Mawsons Court. No. 19 is now occupied by the Japanese restaurant Shiitakeya, and Nos. 21–23 are the home of the bubble tea store Mooboo.

== Architecture ==
The front has mixed finishes: orange‑brown brick on No. 19, painted brick on No. 21, and white‑washed render on No. 23. All have timber shopfronts. Nos. 19 and 21 have a moulded timber eaves band and pantile roofs, while No. 23 has a slate roof.

No. 19's shopfront in 2023

The frontage is two storeys. Nos. 19 and 21 each have two upper windows; No. 23 has three, with the centre one blocked. No. 19 has a shopfront with plain uprights and a wide fascia carried on tall grooved brackets, with recessed glazed double doors between plate‑glass windows above panelled bases. The shopfront to Nos. 21–23 has fluted uprights, a sloping fascia and a moulded cornice on shaped brackets. At the left end are recessed double doors with moulded panels; the shop door to No. 21 is part‑glazed and panelled. The windows are plate glass above moulded panel bases. The first‑floor windows are single‑pane sashes, arched on Nos. 19 and 21 and square‑headed on No. 23, with painted sills on Nos. 21 and 23.

== See also ==
- Listed buildings in York (within the city walls, southern part)
