= Walmgate =

Street in York, England

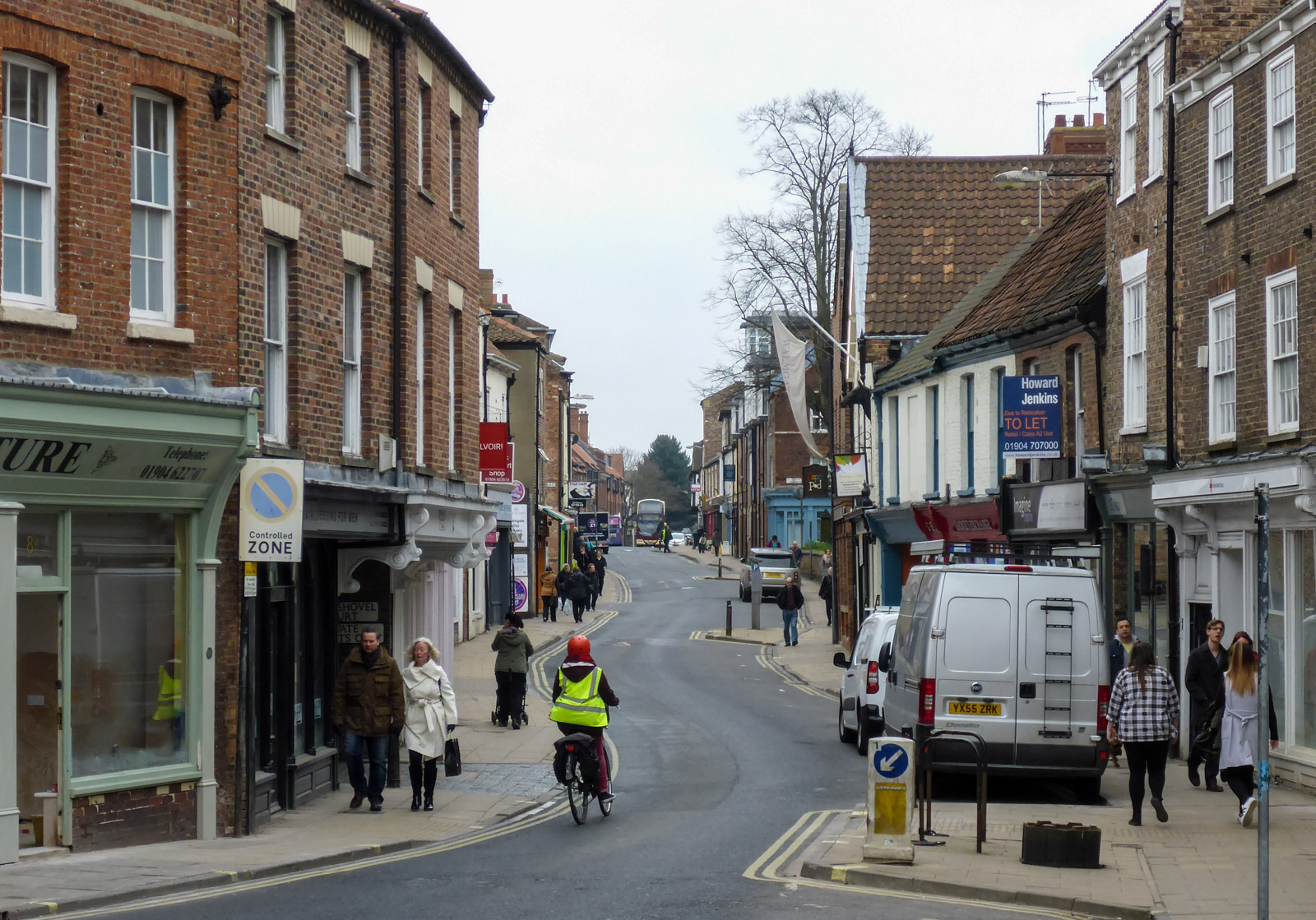
- View south-west on Walmgate, from Foss Bridge
- Location within York
- Location: York, England
- Postal code: YO
- Coordinates: 53.9564°N 1.0743°W
- North west end: Fossgate
- South east end: Lawrence Street; Barbican Road; Foss Islands Road

Walmgate is a street in the city centre of York, England. During the medieval period, the street was the site of a seafish and cattle market. Walmgate Bar was involved in the Siege of York in 1644, during the First English Civil War. During the 20th century, many of the older buildings were cleared away and newer structures put up.

== History ==
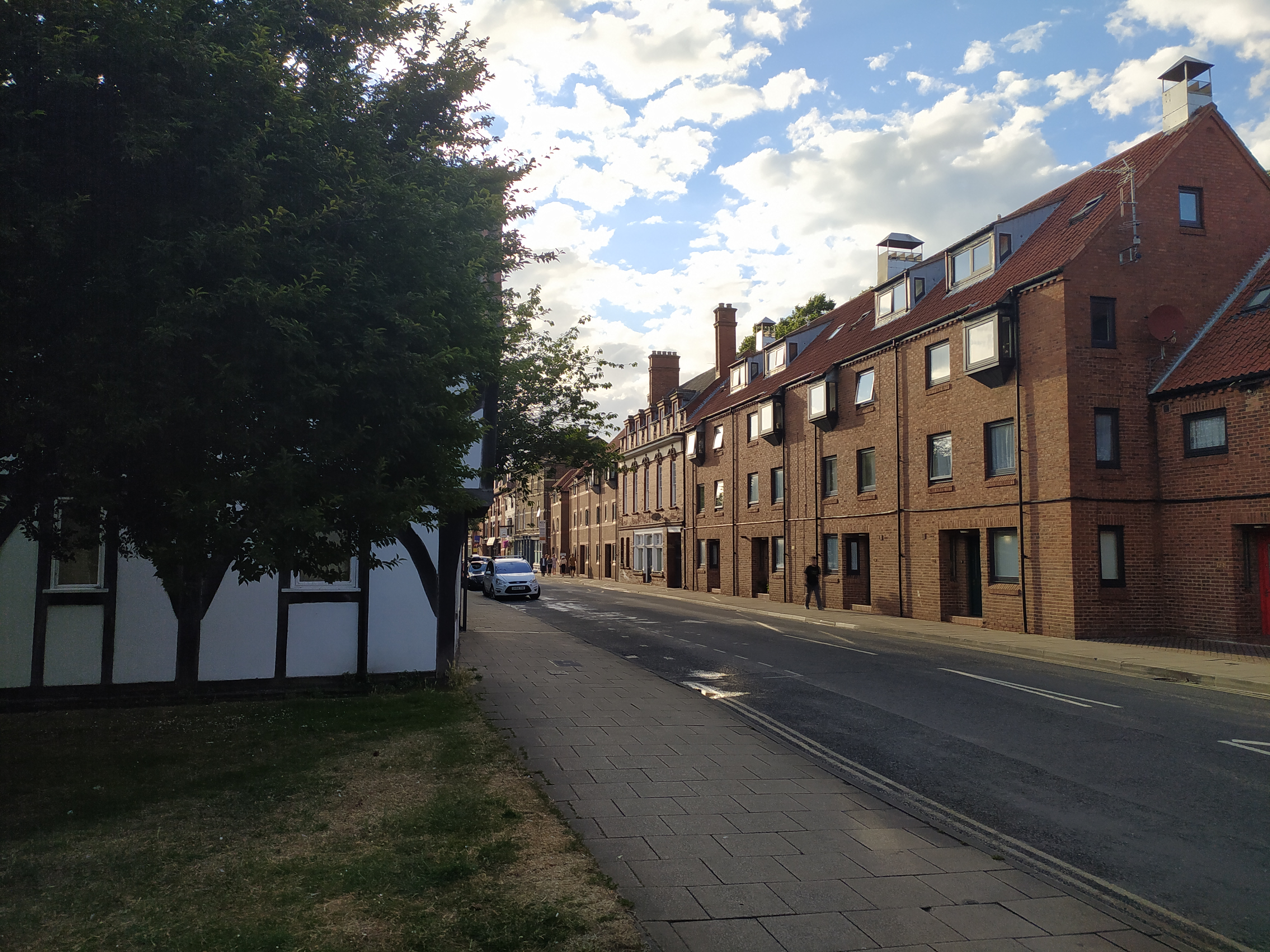
View north west from near Bowes Morrell House

The street lay outside Roman Eboracum, and although it was crossed by a Roman road, evidence of occupation from the period is limited to two wharfs on the River Foss and some burials. The road appears to have developed in the Viking Jorvik period, during which it mostly hosted industrial and commercial uses.

The street was first mentioned in about 1080 as "Walbegate", suggesting it may be named after an individual called Walba. Walmgate Bar, the gate at the south-east end of the street, was built before 1155, but the section of the York city walls enclosing the street was constructed later: permission to build this stretch of wall was granted in 1267, and it was not completed until 1505.

By 1200 Walmgate was an important street, with four churches: St Denys, St Margaret, St Mary and St Peter-le-Willows, of which the first two still survive. The Haberdashers' Hall stood on the street, as did large houses for the Percy and Neville families. Many of the boundaries between building plots date from this period. The area around St Margaret's Church became known for fullers.

A seafish market was held on the street in the medieval period. In 1590 a cattle market was established, held every second Thursday, and from 1632 an annual cattle fair was also held. By the 19th century the market was causing serious congestion, and in 1826 it was moved to a dedicated site outside the walls.

Walmgate Bar was the focus of the Siege of York in 1644, and some buildings on the street were damaged, although most destruction occurred outside the city walls.

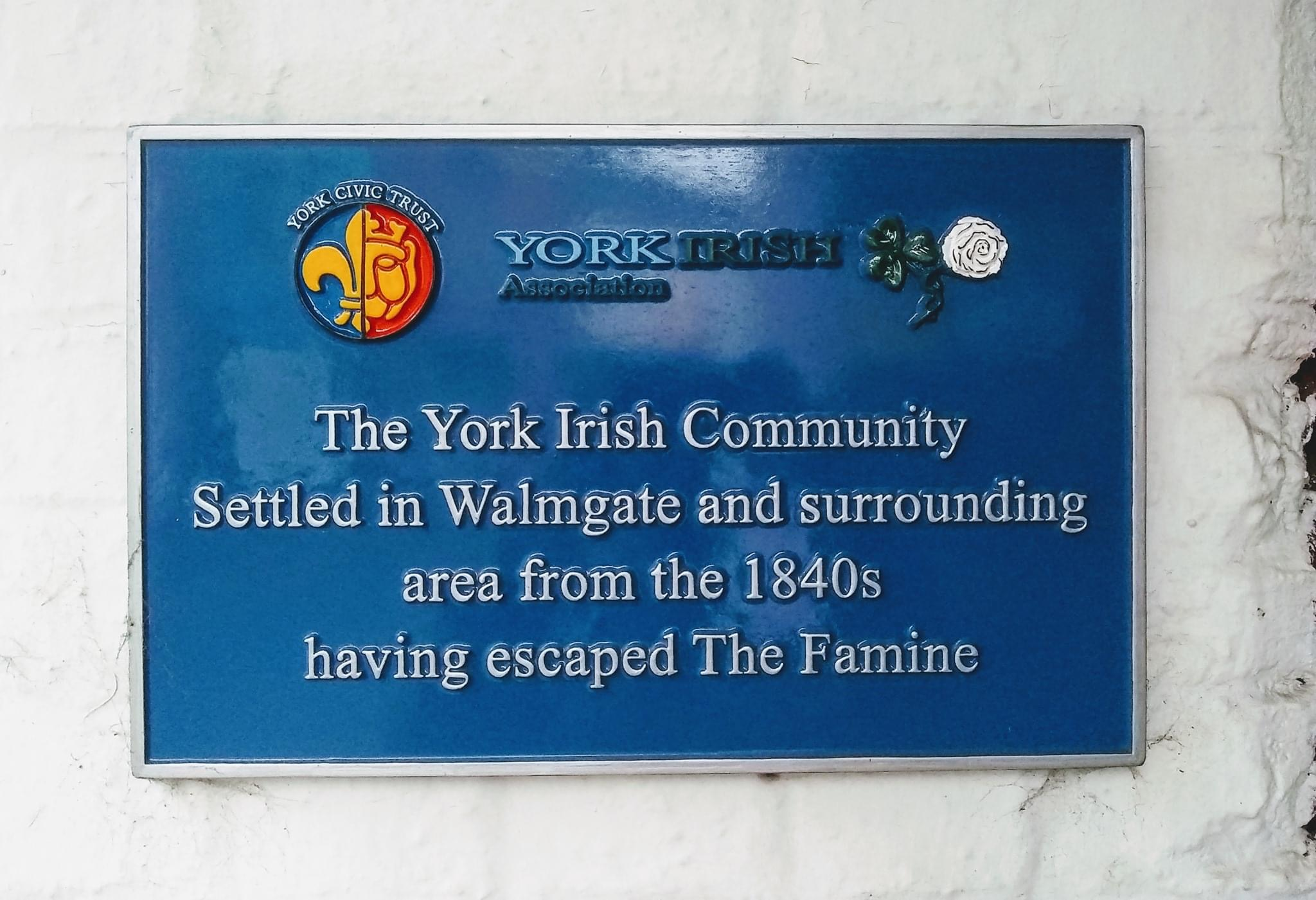
Plaque in remembrance of the local Irish immigrant community

In the 1840s many immigrants from Ireland settled in Walmgate, and by the end of the decade the street and its surrounding alleys housed half of the city's population. Overcrowding and poverty were widespread. St George's Catholic Church was built a short distance away. The street also became known for its pubs, peaking in 1901 with twenty. Industry was present too, including the Victoria Iron Foundry, Walker Foundry (which made the York Minster Lamp Standard around 1860), Caroline Place linen mill, and a brewery.

Many buildings were demolished during 20th-century slum clearance schemes, and from 1950 some council flats were built. Nikolaus Pevsner described the street as "depressing" in 1972, but by 1995 David Neave noted that it had "improved... most of the waste spaces have been filled, but there is still much to be done". Today it is lined with a mix of independent shops, pubs and restaurants, offices and housing.

== Layout and architecture ==
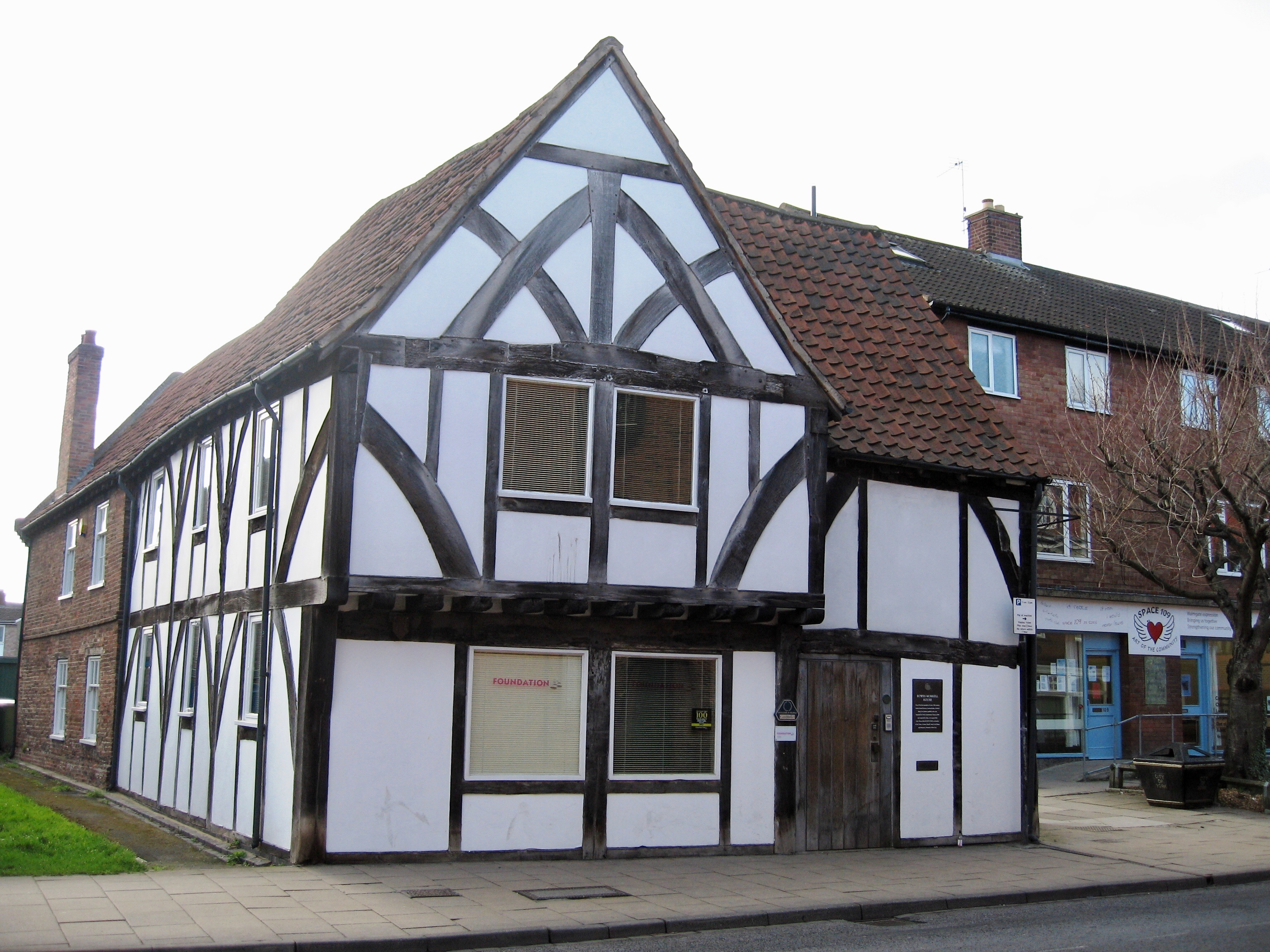
The Bowes Morrell House

The street runs south-east, from Foss Bridge over the River Foss, continuing the route of Fossgate. At the other end, it runs through Walmgate Bar, then ends at the city's inner ring road, at the junction of Lawrence Street, Barbican Road and Foss Islands Road. Merchantgate, Dennis Street, St Denys Road, George Street, Margaret Street, and Hope Street all lead off the south-west side of the road, while Hurst's Yard, Paver Lane, and Navigation Road lead off the north-east side.

Notable buildings on the north-east side include Dorothy Wilson's Hospital, rebuilt in 1812; the mid-18th-century houses at Nos. 8–8A; The Watergate Inn at No. 24, formerly known as the Five Lions; Nos. 26–28, built in the late 18th century; the 15th-century timber-framed building at No. 32; No. 34, built about 1700; Nos. 64–66, from around 1850; the Grade II*-listed Nos. 68–70, and a warehouse behind No. 72, of 18th-century origin; the Grade I-listed St Margaret's Church, now the National Centre for Early Music; the former Spread Eagle pub at No. 98; No. 114, built around 1890; and the Bretgate Flats, built in 1979, and described by Neave as "most successful".

On the south-west side are Foss Bridge House at Nos. 1–3, built in 1878; No. 5, a house from around 1830; the 15th-century Red Lion pub at No. 7, now often described as lying on Merchantgate; the mid-18th-century No. 9 and Nos. 11–11A; No. 13, built around 1840; No. 15, from about 1830; the mid-18th and early-19th-century No. 17; Nos. 19–23 from the late 17th and early 18th century; No. 25, from the late 17th century; Nos. 35–37, built in about 1740; Nos. 65–69A, a terrace of four houses with shops from around 1840; the late-19th-century No. 71; the 15th-century No. 77; St Denys' Church; and Bowes Morrell House at No. 111, built about 1400.
