= St Margaret's Church, York =

Grade I listed church in York, England

St Margaret's Church, Walmgate, York
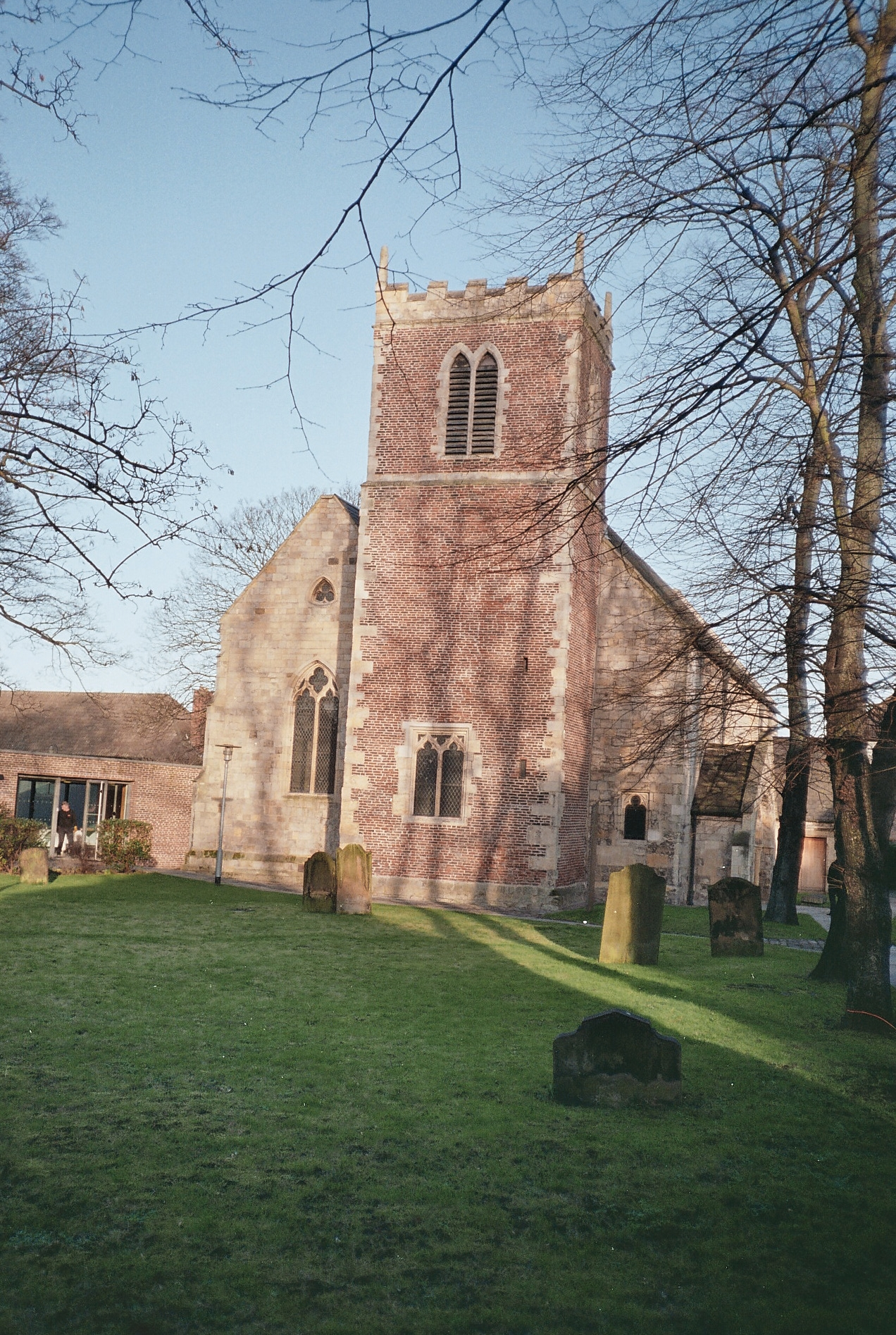
- St Margaret's Church, Walmgate, York
- St Margaret's Church, Walmgate, York
- 53°57′23.7″N 1°4′21.4″W
- OS grid reference: SE 60952 51566
- Location: Walmgate, York
- Country: England
- Previous denomination: Church of England
- Website: www.ncem.co.uk

History
- Status: Parish church
- Dedication: St Margaret

Architecture
- Functional status: Arts centre
- Heritage designation: Grade I listed
- Designated: 12 June 1954
- Style: Medieval
- Closed: 1974

St Margaret's Church, on Walmgate, in York, is a Grade I listed former parish church in the Church of England.

== History ==
The church dates from the 12th century of which the south porch is the only surviving element. The nave is 14th century and the vestry from the 15th century. The tower was rebuilt between 1684 and 1685.

The church was restored by Thomas Pickersgill between 1851 and 1852. The north wall was moved out by 2 yards, the gallery was extended and the church had a new floor laid and was re-pewed. A new roof was added to the nave.

In 1974 the church was declared redundant by the Church of England. The York Theatre Royal used it for storage. In 2000 it reopened as a venue for the National Centre for Early Music, and is now used for performances and as a venue.

== Organ ==
The pipe organ dated from 1855 and was by Ward. A specification of the organ can be found on the National Pipe Organ Register. The organ is no longer present inside the church.

== See also ==
- Grade I listed buildings in the City of York
- Listed buildings in York (within the city walls, southern part)
