= Clifton Wintringham =

Clifton Wintringham was the name of two doctors who lived in York:

- Clifton Wintringham senior (c. 1689–1748)
- Sir Clifton Wintringham, 1st Baronet (1720–1794), son of Clifton Wintringham senior
