= 5 St Sampson's Square =

Listed building in York, England

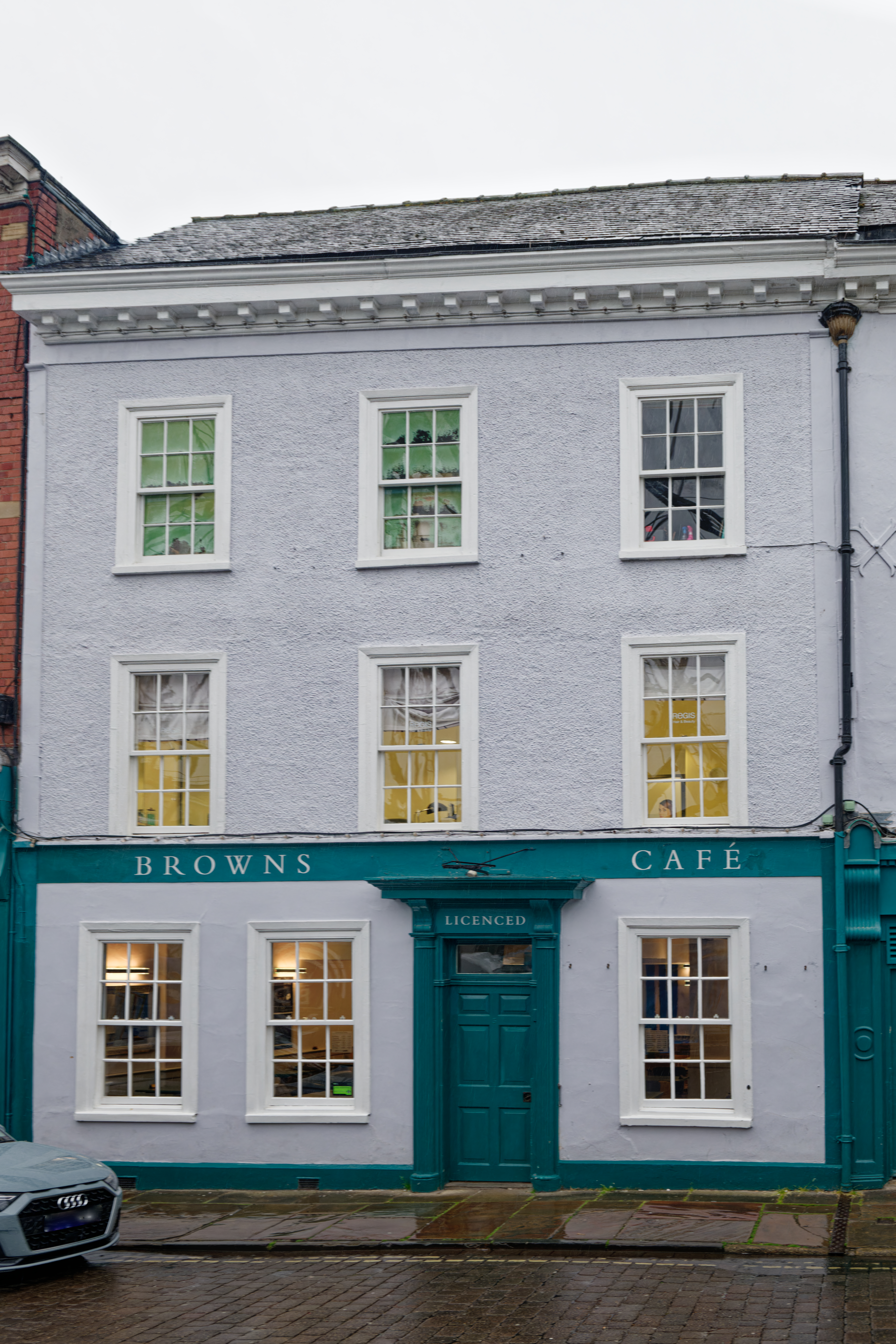
- The building in 2024
- Former names: Golden Lyon

General information
- Type: Inn, now tea rooms
- Location: St Sampson's Square, York, England
- Coordinates: 53°57′35″N 1°04′56″W
- Years built: Early 17th (probable) and early 18th century
- Renovated: Early and late 19th century (altered)

Design and construction
- Designations

Listed Building – Grade II
- Official name: 5, St Sampsons Square
- Designated: 19 August 1971
- Reference no.: 1256729

5 St Sampson's Square is a Grade II listed building on St Sampson's Square in the city of York, England. Originating as an inn known as the Golden Lyon, it comprises an early 18th-century front range incorporating parts of an earlier 17th-century structure, with subsequent alterations in the 19th century. The building forms part of the Central Historic Core conservation area and is now occupied by the department store chain Browns of York, serving as its tea rooms.

== History ==
The building originated as an inn and dates from the second quarter of the 18th century, with later alterations. It was bought in 1729 by Thomas Crosby, an innholder, and was already known as the Golden Lyon. The front range is early 18th‑century, incorporating a rear block thought to be of early 17th‑century origin, with further changes made in the early and later 19th century.

In 1968 the site was included within the newly established Central Historic Core conservation area, and on 19 August 1971, No. 5 was designated a Grade II listed building. It forms part of a short row that includes the adjoining No. 6, also listed at Grade II, and stands next door but one to the Grade II* listed No. 7. All three buildings are now occupied by the department store chain Browns of York, with No. 5 serving as its tea rooms.

== Architecture ==
=== Exterior ===
The rear part of the building is timber‑framed. At the front, the ground floor is finished in colour‑washed stucco, with the upper storeys rendered and painted. A timber cornice marks the eaves, and the roofs are a mix of slate and pantiles. The façade has three storeys and three bays on a low plinth. The entrance, set slightly to the right, has a six‑panel door with an overlight and a surround of fluted half‑columns with a moulded top on scrolled brackets. All the windows are 12‑pane sashes in raised surrounds, with sills on the ground and second floors. A wide fascia runs below the first‑floor windows, and a plain band sits beneath the eaves, which are finished with a moulded cornice on small brackets. A wrought‑iron lantern hangs above the door.

=== Interior ===
The ground‑floor front room has 19th‑century boarded panelling at dado height, with the main ceiling beams and joists left visible. Further back, parts of the earlier timber structure can still be seen, including studwork on the left wall, and on the right the curved head of a former fireplace opening is exposed.

On the first floor, the stair rising to the attic has a shaped string, tall turned balusters and a substantial moulded handrail running up to square newels with attached half‑balusters. In the rear part, the top of a jowled post and a shortened wall plate remain visible.

The second‑floor front right room contains a corner fireplace with a moulded stone surround and a deep shelf, while the front left room retains a two‑panel cupboard door. In the attic, the doors and partitions are simple plank construction, and the roof structure is boarded over.

== See also ==
- Listed buildings in York (within the city walls, northern part)
