= York County Savings Bank =

Bank in York, England

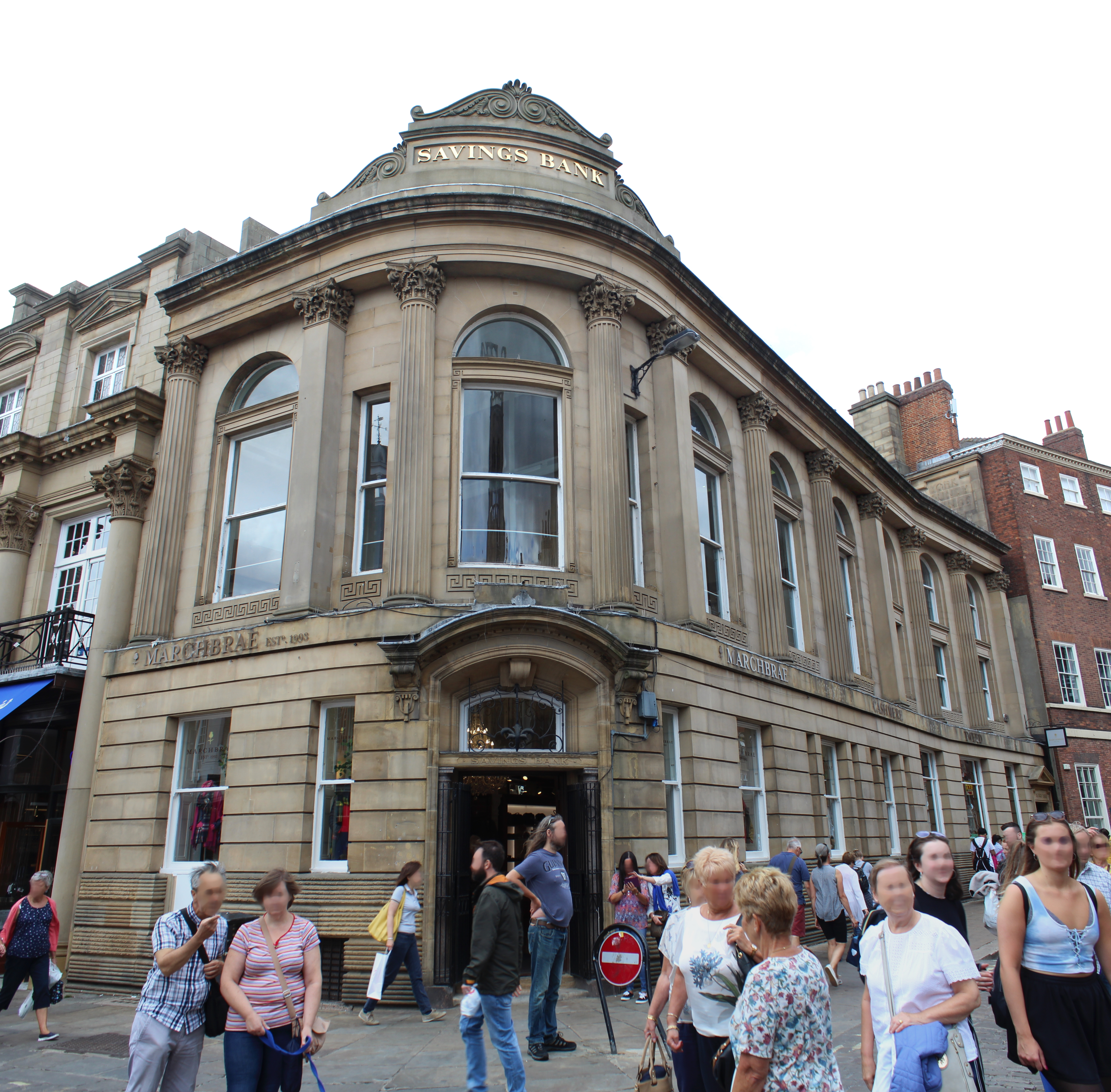
- York County Savings Bank Building in St Helen's Square
- Founded: 1816
- Defunct: 1975
- Fate: Absorbed into the Trustee Savings Bank of Yorkshire and Lincoln
- Headquarters: York

The York County Savings Bank was a savings bank based in York, in England. At one time, it was the third largest savings bank in the country.

== History ==
The bank was established on 13 July 1816, on the initiative of the Corporation of York, as the York Savings Bank. Its aim was to encourage labourers and servants to save money. Around the time of its founding, several commercial banks failed, and this initially limited confidence in it; on the day of opening on the corner of Davygate and New Street, only two deposits were made. However, it was promoted by the local newspapers, and by 1823, £70,923 had been deposited by 1,854 individuals.

A savings bank was opened in Tadcaster around 1820, and it developed a close relationship with the York bank, being widely regarded as a branch office. However, it was not sustainable, and was closed in 1829. The following year, the York bank opened a large new headquarters building, on St Helen's Square. In 1837, it opened a branch in Pocklington, but as in Tadcaster, it was unsuccessful, and closed in 1846.

In 1879, there was a run on the bank, resulting from the insolvency of the bank of Messrs. Swann, Clough, and Co. Robert Swann also being the treasurer of the York Savings Bank, and the practice at the time was to pay withdrawals with banknotes issued by the treasurer's bank. However, the bank proved able to fully honour all requested withdrawals, either in Bank of England banknotes, or in gold and silver. After the run subsided, it adopted a policy of paying future withdrawals in Bank of England notes.

In the early 20th century, the bank absorbed many smaller savings banks:

- 1911: Beverley Savings Bank
- 1911: Driffield Savings Bank
- 1912: Malton Savings Bank
- 1912: Pontefract Savings Bank
- 1913: Howden Savings Bank
- 1913: Northallerton Savings Bank
- c.1913: Thirsk Savings Bank
- 1916: Retford Savings Bank
- 1917: Bridlington Savings Bank
- 1917: Gainsborough Savings Bank
- 1917: Grantham Savings Bank
- 1927: Richmond Savings Bank

The bank also opened its own branches, including one in Scarborough in 1926, and one in Whitby in 1938. By that year, it was the fourth largest savings bank in England, with total funds of £9,000,000, and 130,000 depositors. Its rapid growth continued, under the leadership of W. Louis Lawton, and by 1947 it had more than 50 branches and over £25,000,000 in funds. It was the third largest savings bank in England, and the sixth largest in the UK.

In 1975, the bank merged into the Trustee Savings Bank of Yorkshire and Lincoln.
