= St Sampson's Square =

Open space in York, England

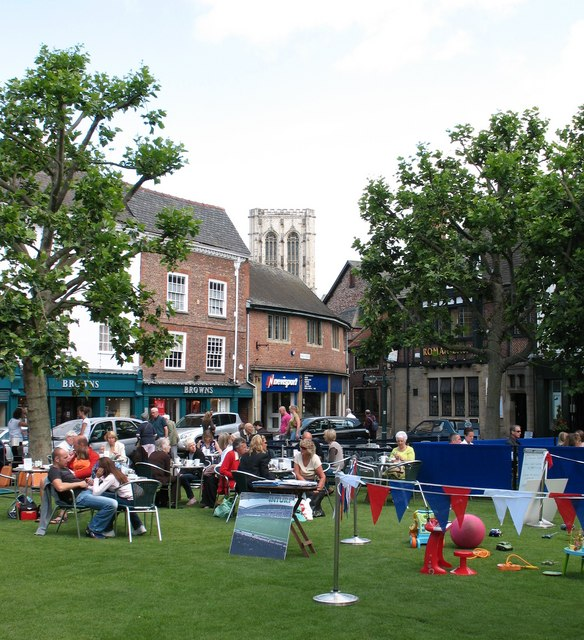
- The square in 2009, with artificial turf
- Location within York
- Former names: Arkilltofts; Thursday Market
- Maintained by: City of York
- Location: York, England
- Coordinates: 53.95965°N 1.08200°W
- North: Finkle Street
- East: Silver Street; Church Street; Parliament Street
- South: Feasegate
- West: Davygate

St Sampson's Square is an open space, and former marketplace, in the city centre of York, England.

== History ==
In the 12th-century, the area now occupied by the square was known as Arkilltofts, possibly named after Arnketil, a leading figure in the city around the time of the Norman Conquest. It was a large open space, occupying the south-eastern corner of the former Roman fortress. By 1130, it was owned by the royal larderer. At this time, he held responsibility for the sale of meat in the city, and a market gradually developed in the area. Initially, the site occupied around 10,000 square yards, although this has been reduced over time, as buildings encroached on the space, forming a square.

By about 1250, the square was named Thursday Market, suggesting that, at the time, it hosted a market just one day a week. By the 14th-century, it was known in particular as a place to buy meat, although in the following century, only traders from outside the city could sell in the square, with York-based merchants instead confined to the nearby Shambles. The square was also the main location for the sale of fabric, and at times, baked goods, wool, candles, and certain other foodstuffs were also sold in the market. By the 16th-century, markets were held on Tuesday, Thursday, and Saturday, and in 1593, a Friday market was added for linen and other cloths.

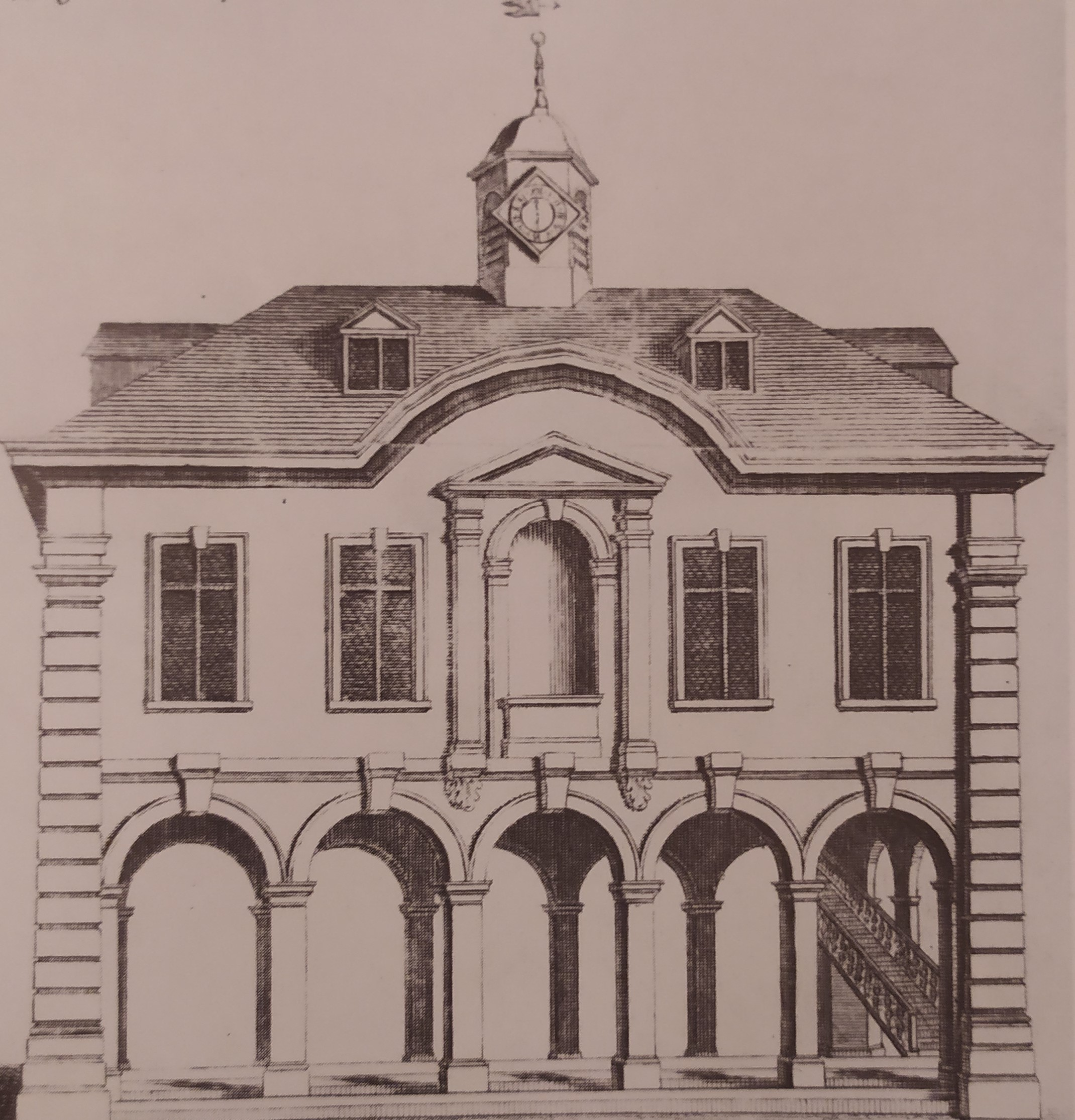
The market hall, built in 1704

In 1421, the widow of John Brathwayt, a former Mayor of York, donated 20 marks for the construction of a market cross, and a guard house was later built alongside it. In 1704, Elizabeth Smith, who leased the square, obtained permission to demolish the cross, and in its place she built a small market hall, with a statue of George II.

In 1765, a school was established in the upper chamber of the market hall, but it moved elsewhere in 1786. In 1818, the location became known as "St Sampson's Square", after St Sampson, Church Street, which can be seen from the square.

By the 1830s, the market had become overcrowded, and Parliament Street was constructed, linking the square with the city's other market, on Pavement, and a large market established along its length. The part of the market in St Sampson's Square continued to specialise in meat, until 1888, when it switched to selling fish. By 1852, there were seven inns around the square.

In 1955, the market stalls were moved to what is now Shambles Market, and the square became a car park. It was pedestrianised in 1976, and is now a popular location for festivals and seasonal markets. Public toilets were a feature of the square for many years, but were closed in 2010 and demolished in 2019.

== Layout and architecture ==
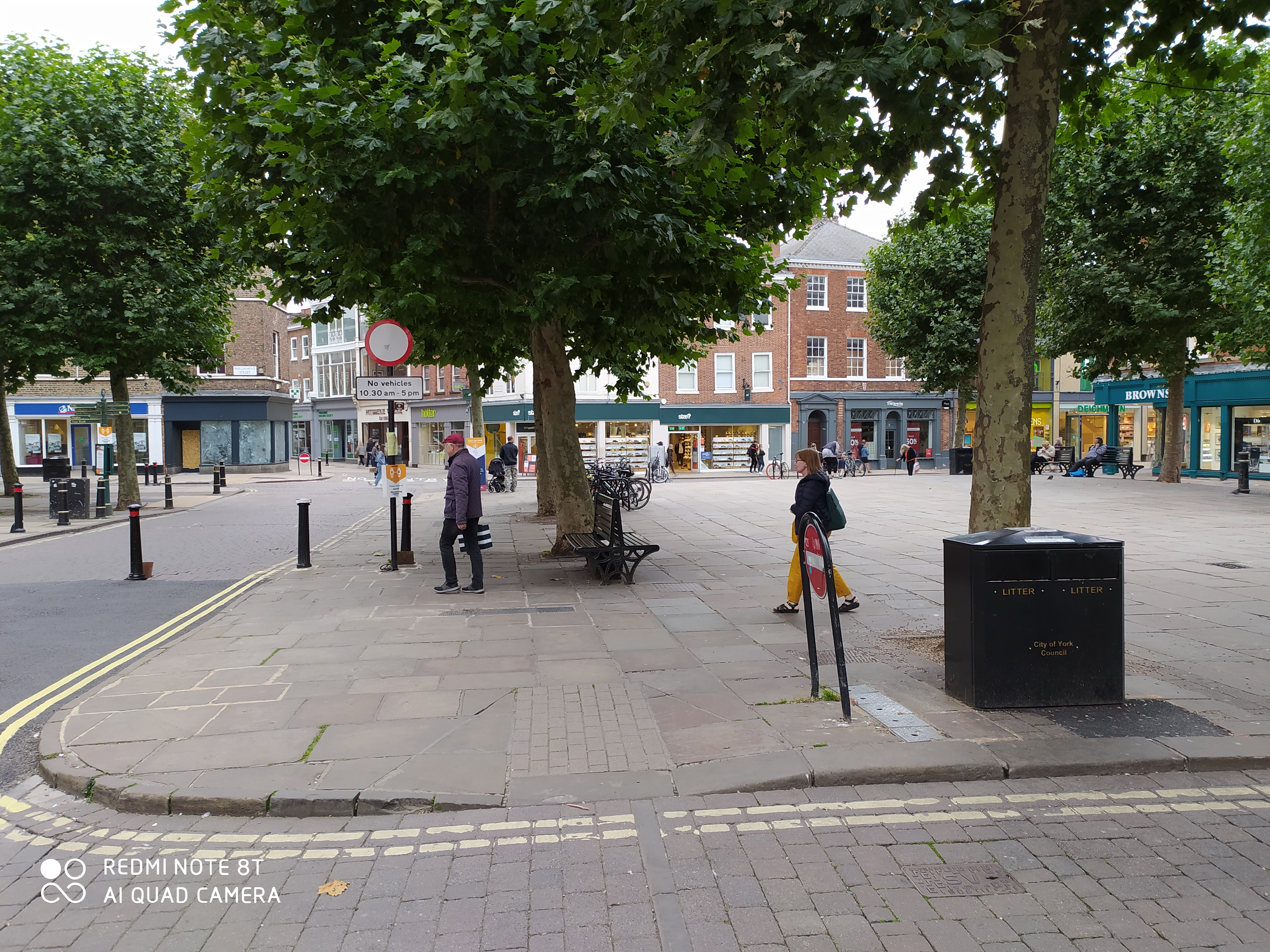
The square, from the east

The square is largely enclosed by buildings, with streets leading from each of its four corners: Feasegate from the southern corner, Davygate from the western, Finkle Street from the northern, and both Silver Street and Church Street from the eastern. Parliament Street leads south-east, its broad entrance occupying much of the south-eastern side. Two snickelways also connect to the square: Nether Hornpot Lane from the northern corner, and Three Cranes Lane from the middle of the north-eastern side.

The north-western side is dominated by Brown's department store, built in 1905 to replace several timber-framed houses. The square contains numerous listed buildings: No. 5 and No. 6 date from the 18th century, and No. 7 is probably 16th-century in origin. On the north-east side, the Roman Bath pub at No. 9 incorporates the remains of a Roman bath in its cellar, operated as a tourist attraction. The mid-18th-century Three Cranes at No. 11 is the other surviving pub on the square; and No. 12 is also listed. On the south-east side, Nos. 13 and 14, and No. 15 are separately listed. On the south-west side, No. 1 and No. 2 are separately listed, as is Melrose House at No. 3; all 18th-century buildings.
