= Judges' Lodgings, York =

Grade I listed building in North Yorkshire, England

Judges' Lodgings
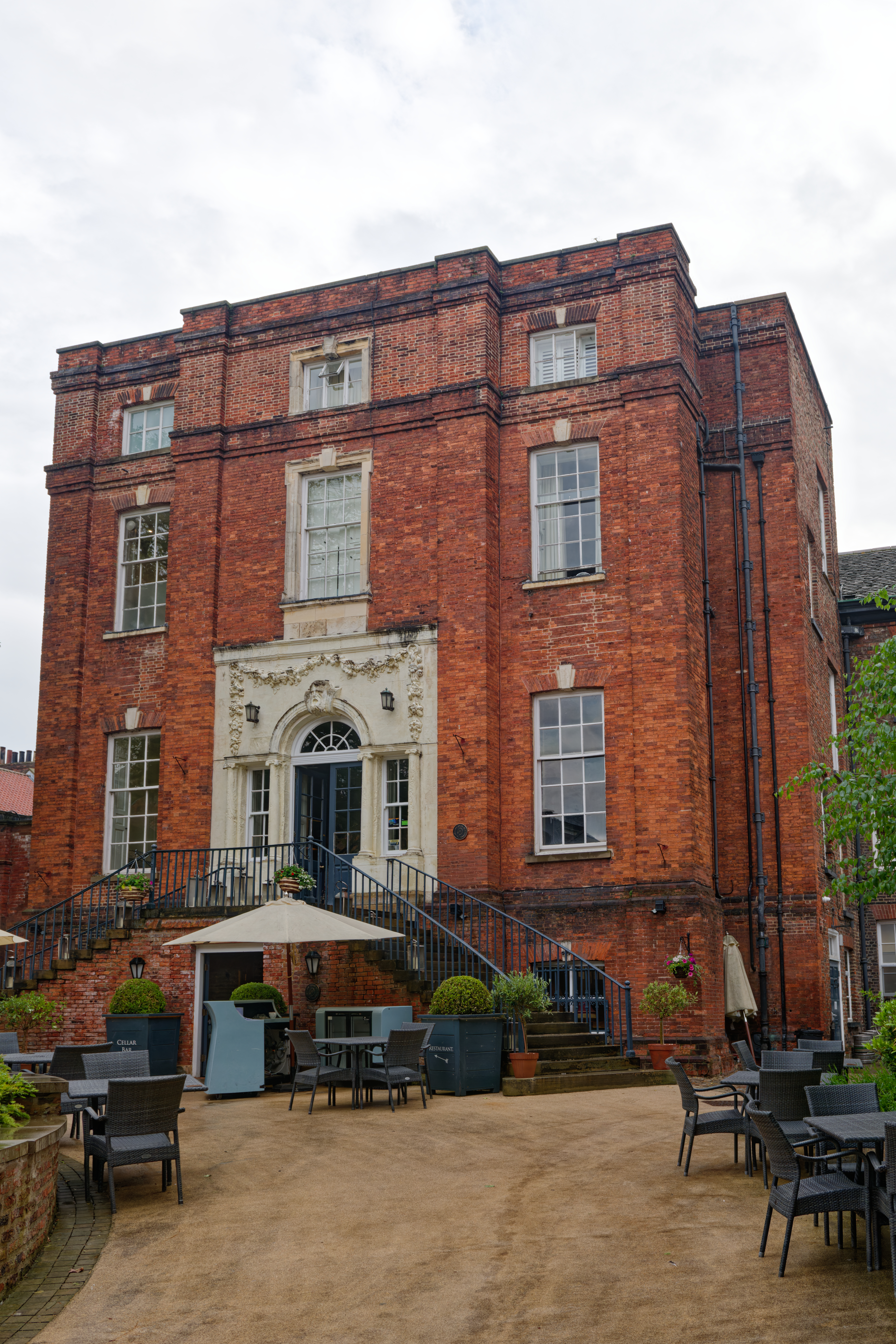
- The building in 2024
- Former names: The Judge's Lodging

General information
- Status: Converted to hotel use
- Location: 9 Lendal, York, North Yorkshire, England
- Coordinates: 53°57′38″N 1°05′07″W
- Completed: c. 1726; 300 years ago
- Renovated: Late 18th century (service wing); Early 19th century (extended) c. 1840 (raised); 1936 (extended)

Technical details
- Floor count: 2 + cellar + attic

Design and construction
- Designations

Listed Building – Grade I
- Official name: Judges Lodging
- Designated: 14 June 1954
- Reference no.: 1257487

Website
- judgeslodgingyork.co.uk

The Judges' Lodgings is a Grade I listed townhouse on Lendal in York, North Yorkshire, England. It is so named because from 1806 it provided accommodation for judges visiting the city to sit in the assize courts, which were held four times each year.

== History ==
=== Construction ===
The building was erected between 1711 and 1726 on land that formerly belonged to St Wilfred's Church; which had been demolished between 1550 and 1587. In 1736, Francis Drake recorded the recent building of a house for Clifton Winteringham senior in Lendal. He described it as one of the "best built houses in the city". Drake recalled that when the foundations were dug "several cart loads of human bones were thrown up". The architect is unknown, but it may have been Lord Burlington. He designed and built the Assembly Rooms in 1730, and possibly the Mansion House between 1725 and 1730, both nearby. The house is an early example of the 18th-century classical style. Festoons of fruit emphasise the unusual stone door surround, which is framed by a Venetian style arch. The keystone of the arch is carved with a bearded mask representing Aesculapius, the Greek demi-god of medicine. John Cossins included an image of the house on his New and Exact Plan of the City of York (1727).

The wing to the south-east of the building was built in three stages. In the 18th century, the first two storeys were constructed, in 1806 a further extension was erected and in the mid-19th century, a third storey was added. The outside front stairs are 19th-century, originally there was only a single flight to the front door. The fireplaces in the dining room, breakfast room and office are all 19th-century. The main internal staircase is Georgian and is made from oak, as are the doors and treads. In the dining room, hidden behind a secret panel, concealed by a window shutter, is a chamber pot, which was for the use of the judges and other gentlemen diners.

During excavations in the early 1980s, a 3-metre (9 ft 10 in) by 2-metre (6 ft 7 in) area of floor in a mid-18th-century cellar beneath the house was removed. Measurements had shown that the area lay within the rear chamber of the late Roman interval tower, one of six along the south-west façade of the Roman fortress. Excavations revealed that the cellar builders had dug out any remaining late Roman levels, although part of an early Roman building was found represented entirely by its foundations of cobbles and clay, lying on a similar alignment to the fortress itself.

=== Early use ===
It was built as the private residence for Clifton Winteringham senior (1689–1748), a medical practitioner. He was appointed Physician at York County Hospital in March 1746.

Winteringham was a governor of the hospital and attended the Earl of Carlisle at nearby Castle Howard. He authored books and practised in York for over 35 years. On the main door of the building is the Greek god of healing, Aesculapius. Dr Winteringham is buried in St Michael le Belfrey Church, opposite York Minster. After his death, the building was bought by Dr John Dealtry.

=== Later uses ===
In 1806, the building was bought out of county rates for use as the judges' residence, when they attended the quarterly sessions at the assize courts at York Castle. These were criminal courts held for the most serious crimes in the country. The judges were of the Kings Bench Division of the High Court of Justice. It was given five commissioners, picked from Justices of the Peace for the Three Ridings. A Mr and Mrs Kilvington were appointed to keep house, for which they received a salary from the county. The rooms on the top floor of this building were allocated to the judge's own staff and the rooms in the wing were kept for resident housekeepers.

The Judges' Lodgings was opened as a hotel in 1979 by a French couple, featuring in The Good Food Guide and later purchased by Daniel Thwaites in 2012, as part of their hotel group

== See also ==
- Grade I listed buildings in the City of York
- Listed buildings in York (within the city walls, northern part)
