= Harkers, York =

Listed pub in York, England

Harkers
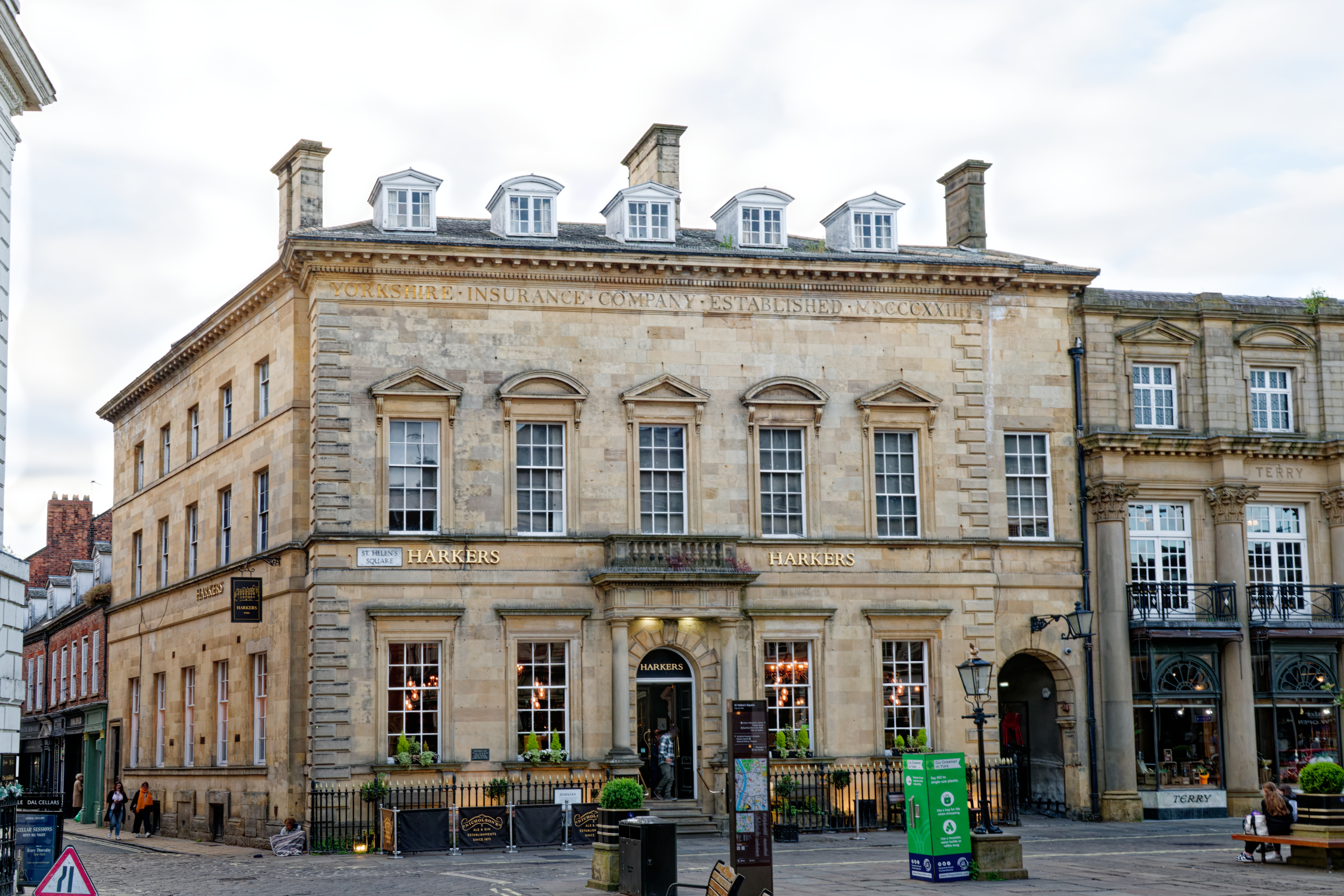
- The pub in 2024
- Former names: Yorkshire Insurance Company

General information
- Type: Public house (formerly offices)
- Architectural style: Italianate
- Location: St Helen's Square, York, England
- Coordinates: 53°57′37″N 1°05′05″W
- Year built: 1847; 179 years ago
- Client: Yorkshire Insurance Company
- Owner: Mitchells & Butlers

Design and construction
- Architect: George Townsend Andrews
- Designations

Listed Building – Grade II
- Official name: Yorkshire Insurance Company and railings attached to front
- Designated: 1 July 1968
- Reference no.: 1256794

Website
- Official website

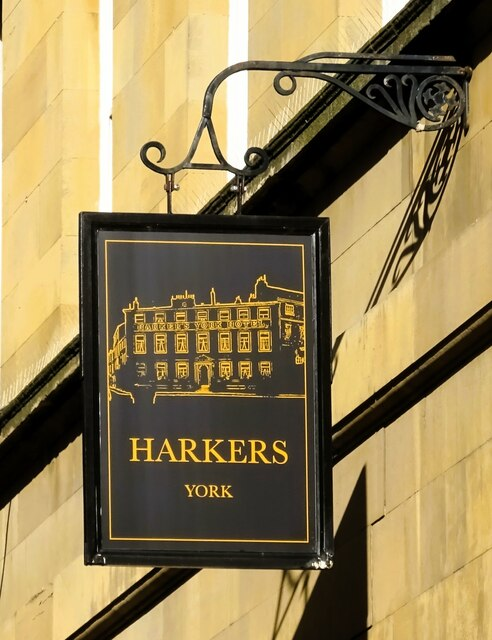
The sign above the entrance

Harkers is a public house in the city centre of York, England. Built in 1847 as the headquarters of the Yorkshire Insurance Company to a design by George Townsend Andrews, it stands on St Helen's Square at its corner with Lendal. It was converted into a pub in the 1990s and is operated by Nicholson's.

== History ==
The building was designed by George Townsend Andrews as the headquarters of the Yorkshire Insurance Company. It was completed in 1847 and stands on St Helen's Square, at its corner with Lendal. It was Grade II listed in 1968. In the 1990s it was converted into a pub. The pub is owned by the Mitchells & Butlers group and was renovated in 2022. As of March 2026 it is operated by Nicholson's, with the freehold remaining in the ownership of Mitchells & Butlers.

== Architecture ==
The design of the building is inspired by the Palazzo Farnese in Rome. It is a sandstone building of two storeys, with a basement and attic. The front to St Helen's Square is five bays wide, with an additional bay forming an entrance arch to Breary's Court. The main entrance has a Doric porch, reached by five stone steps, with double doors. A prominent frieze beneath the cornice reads "YORKSHIRE INSURANCE COMPANY ESTABLISHED MDCCXXIIII". The Lendal front also has five bays and is of similar design, but all the windows are blocked.

Inside, the original interior survives, including a staircase with a cast-iron balustrade, a mahogany counter, doors and panelling, and plasterwork including a cornice. The boardroom on the first floor has a fireplace in the 18th-century style. The railings in front of the building are also original and form part of the listing.

== See also ==
- Listed buildings in York (within the city walls, northern part)
