= York County Savings Bank Building =

Listed building in York, England

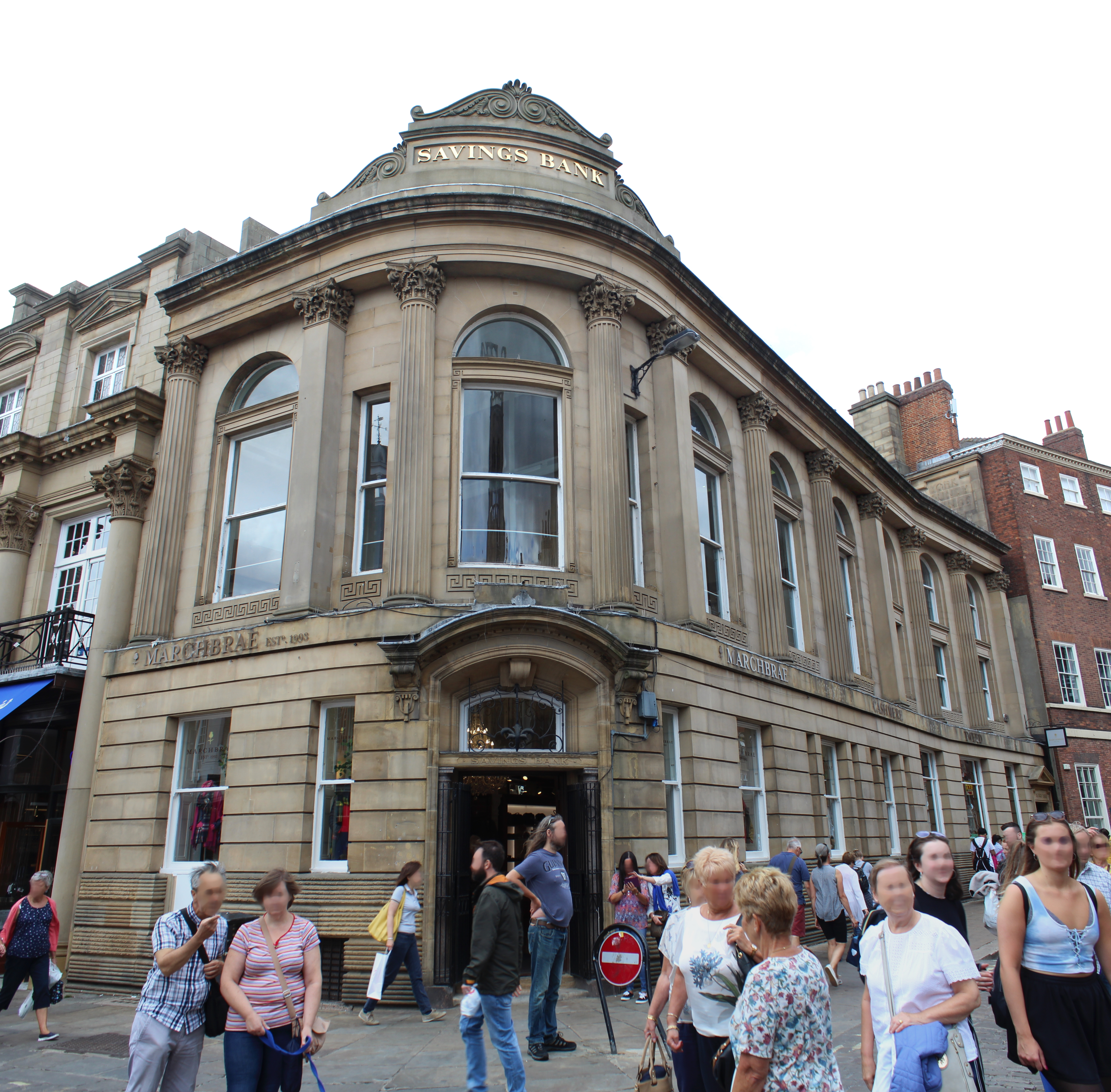
- The building in 2018
- Interactive map of the York County Savings Bank Building area
- Alternative names: 5 St Helen's Square; Impossible Motel

General information
- Status: Converted into a motel
- Type: Bank (former)
- Location: St Helen's Square, York, England
- Coordinates: 53°57′37″N 1°05′04″W
- Year built: 1829–30
- Renovated: 1924 (extended); 1991 (altered); 2022 (converted)
- Client: York County Savings Bank

Design and construction
- Architects: Watson, Pritchett and Watson
- Designations

Listed Building – Grade II
- Official name: 5, St Helens Square
- Designated: 1 July 1968
- Reference no.: 1256798

Website
- impossiblemotel.com

The York County Savings Bank Building (officially listed as 5 St Helen's Square) is a historic building in the city centre of York, England, now trading as the Impossible Motel.

== History ==
The York County Savings Bank was established in 1816, and in 1829 it purchased a large timber-framed house on St Helen's Square from R. Cattle. Watson, Pritchett and Watson designed a new headquarters building for the bank on the site, which was completed in March 1830 at a cost of £4,691.

In the early 20th century the position of the doors was altered, and the internal ground-floor layout was changed. In 1924 the building was extended to the north-west along Blake Street. It was Grade II listed in 1968. In 1976 the bank became part of the Trustee Savings Bank (TSB). The ground floor was further altered in 1991. The TSB later became part of Lloyds TSB, then independent again before leaving the building in 2015. In 2022 the building was converted into the Impossible Motel.

== Architecture ==
The original part of the building has two storeys and is built of brick, but faced with sandstone quarried near Huddersfield. It has one-and-a-half bays facing St Helen's Square, one curving around the corner, and three-and-a-half bays facing Blake Street. The extension has three storeys, but each is lower, allowing the roofline to remain the same, and it continues for a further three bays along Blake Street.

The entrance is a double door in the curved bay, flanked by Doric columns, while the first floor has Composite columns and plain pilasters. The original doors have been converted into windows, and there is a secondary door at the far end of the extension. At the corner is a pediment carved with the words "SAVINGS BANK".

Inside, the former boardroom on the first floor has a coffered ceiling with oak-leaf and acorn decorations. In the extension is an early 19th-century chimney piece, which has been relocated.

== See also ==
- Listed buildings in York (within the city walls, northern part)
