= Lendal Cellars =

Listed pub in York, England

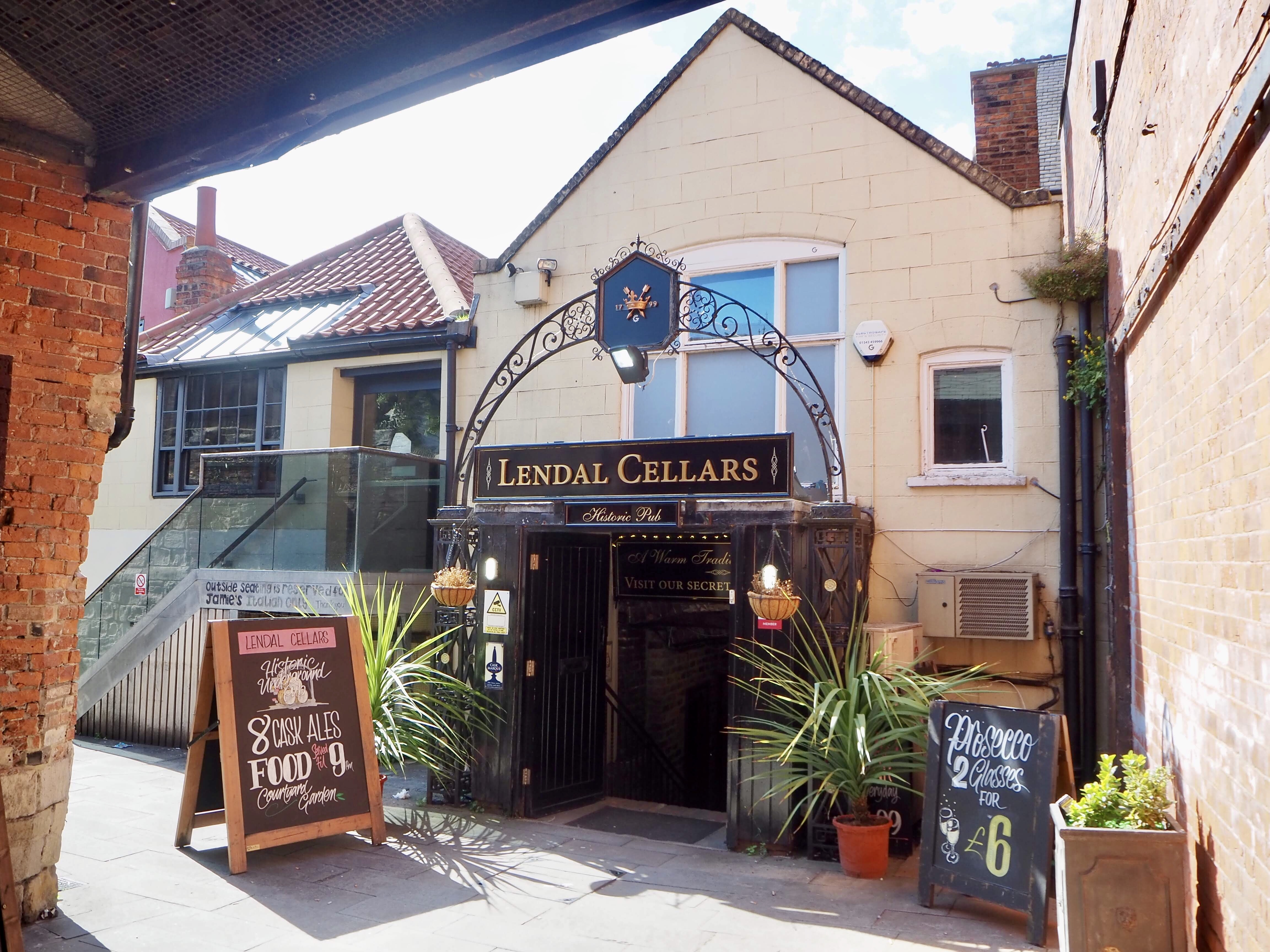
- The pub in 2019

General information
- Type: Public house (formerly wine‑merchant's premises)
- Location: 26 Lendal, York, England
- Coordinates: 53.9600°N 1.0852°W
- Year built: Early 19th century
- Opening: 1984; 42 years ago (as a pub)
- Renovated: Late 19th century (extended); 20th century (altered)
- Owner: Greene King

Design and construction
- Designations

Listed Building – Grade II
- Official name: Number 26 and the Lendal Cellars public house
- Designated: 9 February 1988
- Reference no.: 1257472

Website
- Official website

Lendal Cellars is a Grade II listed public house reached from a passageway off Lendal in York, England. The building incorporates late‑17th and mid‑18th‑century cellars and stands on stone footings thought to be remnants of the late-13th-century Augustinian Friary that occupied the site until the Dissolution. The premises were rebuilt in the early 19th century for wine‑merchant use, with later 19th and 20th‑century alterations. The building was added to the Central Historic Core conservation area in 1968 and became a pub in 1984. As of September 2026, the freehold is owned by Greene King.

== History ==
The dividing wall between the second and third cellar ranges stands on stone footings thought to be surviving traces of the Augustinian Friary that occupied the site from the late 13th century until the Dissolution. The property was later taken over by the local wine merchants J. and G. Oldfield, who are recorded there from 1644. It was subsequently rebuilt as wine‑merchant's premises in the early 19th century, and now incorporates late‑17th and mid‑18th‑century cellars along with later 19th and 20th‑century alterations. The building is accessed via a passageway from Lendal, just before the street becomes Coney Street.

In 1968 the site was included within the newly established Central Historic Core conservation area. Lendal Cellars opened as a public house in 1984, and on 9 February 1988 the address, comprising the pub and a separate part of the structure then used as offices, was designated a Grade II listed building. The adjoining part of the building is now occupied as a restaurant. As of September 2026, the pub's freehold is owned by Greene King.

== Architecture ==
The building is mostly red brick, with much of the exterior covered in cement render. It has a small timber porch and tiled roofs with brick chimneys. It consists of two parallel sections built above three cellar ranges. The front is single‑storey with cellars below, arranged in two bays: the left has a hipped roof with a simple eaves band and decorative iron scrolls, reached by stone steps leading to a doorway and a three‑part sash window. The right bay has a gabled roof, a flat‑roofed porch over steps down to a cellar entrance with a curved arch, and a large modern casement window at ground level.

=== Interior ===
One of the vaults in 2023

The cellars consist of three parallel brick‑vaulted ranges with curved ceilings that meet at groined junctions. The first two have stone‑flagged floors, while the third has a brick floor and retains stone barrel supports and slate dividers for storage bins. The wall between the second and third ranges stands on stone footings that are thought to be surviving fragments of the Augustinian Friary.

== See also ==
- Listed buildings in York (within the city walls, northern part)
