= 8 Lendal =

Listed pub in York, England

- The building in 2023
- Alternative names: The Old Bank

General information
- Status: Converted to public house
- Type: House; later in commercial use
- Location: Lendal, York, England
- Coordinates: 53°57′37″N 1°05′09″W
- Year built: c. 1840; 186 years ago
- Renovated: 20th century (modernised, altered and shopfront)

Design and construction
- Designations

Listed Building – Grade II
- Official name: 8, Lendal
- Designated: 24 June 1983
- Reference no.: 1257485

8 Lendal is a Grade II listed building on Lendal in the city of York, England. Much of its present form dates from around 1840, when it was built as a house incorporating earlier 17th‑century fabric. It was altered in the 20th century for commercial use, becoming part of a bank with offices above. The building now forms part of The Old Bank public house, which also occupies the adjoining Grade II*‑listed Nos. 10 and 12.

== History ==
No. 8 is a narrow three‑storey building on part of the former site of the Augustinian Friary. Much of its present form dates from around 1840, when it was built as a house on Lendal, but it retains elements of a 17th‑century property known as Lendal House, once occupied by Sir Richard Osbaldeston, later by Sir Thomas Widdrington, recorder of York, and then by Sir Thomas Rokeby. In 1704 the building was bought by Thomas Barstow, with part remaining in his family for about a century and another portion apparently sold soon afterwards to alderman Baines.

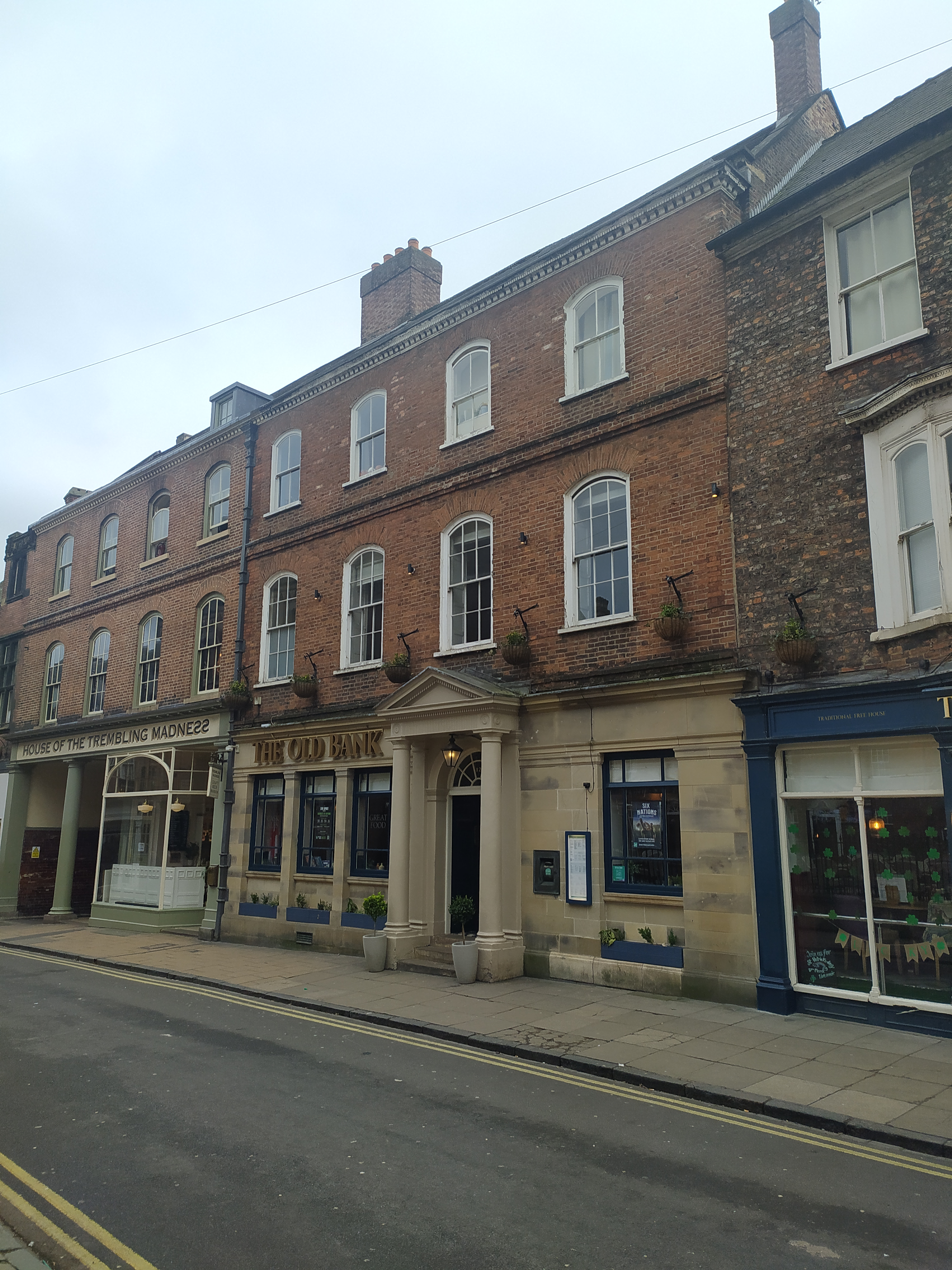
The Old Bank pub at Nos. 10 and 12, with No. 8 partly visible on the right of the terrace

It was altered and modernised in the 20th century, and the ground floor was adapted for commercial use, later becoming part of a bank with offices above. In 1968 the site was included within the newly established Central Historic Core conservation area, and on 24 June 1983, No. 8 was designated a Grade II listed building. It is now used as part of the Old Bank public house, which also occupies Nos. 10 and 12, part of a separately Grade II*-listed terrace (Nos. 10–14) adjoining the building.

== Architecture ==
The surviving 17th‑century parts form two tall storeys, with the north‑west side wall facing the alley showing a lower section of heavily textured brickwork. An original chimney between the front and back rooms was removed around 1950, though substantial beams and simple joists remain, and the roof includes reused timbers from the same period.

The front of the building is in mottled orange‑grey brick, with the right side finished in red brick on the lower floors and matching the front at the top; the shopfront is timber. The slate roof slopes towards the street and is gabled at the rear, with decorative wrought‑iron scrolls at the corners. The building has three storeys and a single window bay on the front.

The ground floor has a pilastered shopfront with plate‑glass windows returning along the right side. On the first floor there is a three‑part canted bay window, with a central sash under a small arched head and flanking single‑pane sashes, all beneath a dentilled cornice. The second floor has two four‑pane sash windows with painted stone sills. At the back, the gabled elevation has 20th‑century two‑light windows on each visible storey.

== See also ==
- Listed buildings in York (within the city walls, northern part)
