= 10–14 Lendal =

Listed terrace in York, England

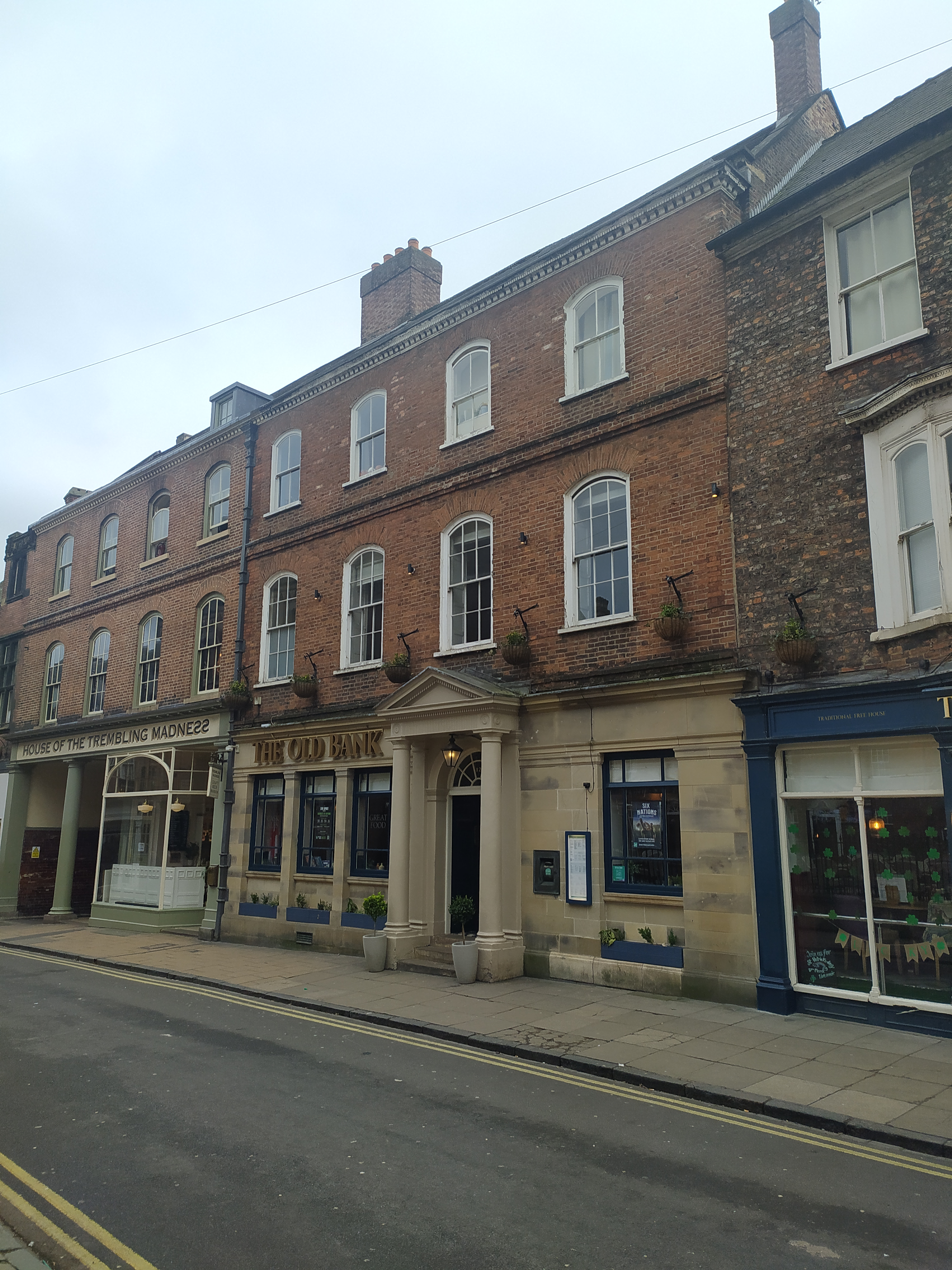
- The terrace in 2023; The Old Bank occupies Nos. 10 and 12, with No. 14 at the left
- Former names: 11–15 Lendal

General information
- Status: Converted to public houses
- Type: Houses; later in commercial use
- Location: Lendal, York, England
- Coordinates: 53°57′37″N 1°05′09″W
- Year built: Early 18th century
- Renovated: c. 1880 (converted) c. 1890 (carriage gates); 1959 (No. 12 converted)

Design and construction
- Designations

Listed Building – Grade II*
- Official name: Numbers 10, 12 and 14 and carriage gates attached to number 14
- Designated: 14 June 1954
- Reference no.: 1257491

10–14 Lendal form a Grade II* listed terrace on Lendal in the city of York, England. Built in the early 18th century as a pair of houses commissioned by Henry Baines, they appear in early views by Samuel Buck and on John Cossins' map, and No. 14 was later home to the astronomer John Goodricke. In the 19th century the terrace was adapted for offices and shops, with No. 10 used by the architectural practice of J. B. and W. Atkinson and No. 12 further altered for bank use in 1959. The terrace was included in the Central Historic Core conservation area in 1968. Nos. 10 and 12 are now occupied by The Old Bank public house, while No. 14 is the premises of the House of the Trembling Madness pub.

== History ==
Numbers 10–14 were built on Lendal in the early 18th century as a pair of houses. (Note: Another source gives a construction date between 1712 and 1716.) Commissioned by Henry Baines, an alderman and later lord mayor, they appear in early-18th‑century views by Samuel Buck and on John Cossins' map. They were also known at one time as Nos. 11–15, though the dates of this numbering are uncertain. No. 14 was later home to the astronomer John Goodricke, who died in 1786.

Around 1870, No. 10 became the office of architects J. B. and W. Atkinson, successors to John Carr of York; James Demaine joined the firm in 1877, followed by Walter Brierley in 1886 after W. Atkinson's death. The practice's successors remained at the address at the time of the building's listing. The buildings were adapted for offices and shops around 1880, and carriage gates dating from about 1890 are attached at the rear beneath No. 14. No. 12 was further altered for bank use in 1959.

On 14 June 1954, the terrace was designated a Grade II* listed building, and in 1968 the site was included within the newly established Central Historic Core conservation area. Nos. 10 and 12 are now occupied by The Old Bank public house, and No. 14 is the premises of the House of the Trembling Madness pub. The Old Bank also occupies No. 8, a separately Grade II-listed building adjoining the terrace.

== Architecture ==
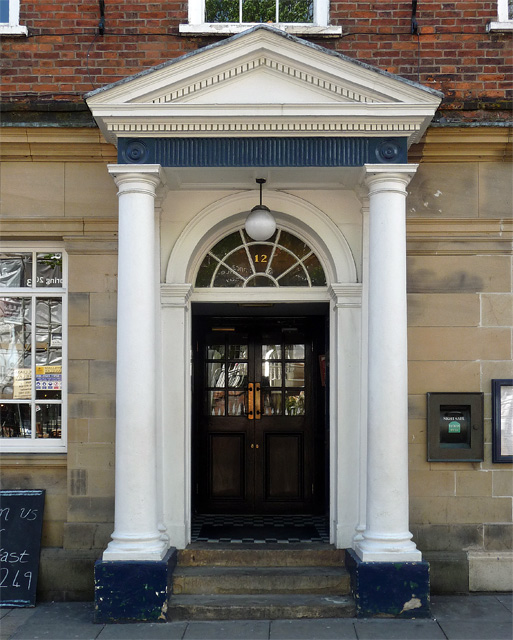
Doorway of No. 12 in 2013

The terrace is mainly brick, with Nos. 10 and 12 having a stone-framed doorway and porch. The front has a timber eaves line; the rear has a simple brick parapet with a stone top. The roof has two spans, tiled at the front and slated at the back, with shortened brick chimneys. One rear gable is shaped. Nos. 10 and 12 include two dormers with small sash windows.

The frontage has three storeys and eight windows. Slightly right of centre is a porch with Tuscan detailing and double doors beneath a fanlight. The ground floor is framed with pilasters and a plain fascia. To the left are margin‑glazed windows; to the right, No. 10 has a six‑panel door with a patterned overlight. The left end of No. 14 has been altered to form a carriage entrance with plain classical supports. The shopfront includes a canted display window with a blocked clerestory, set between two recessed openings, one now a window, the other a glazed door, each with tall small‑pane overlights. First‑floor windows vary between small sashes at Nos. 10 and 12 and larger sashes at No. 14; the second floor has short four‑pane sashes throughout. All windows sit under shallow brick arches with painted sills. A raised band marks the second floor. The eaves have dentils and brackets, with a rainwater head dated 1774 and a decorative downpipe clamp.

The rear has three storeys and a basement, with seven windows. Basement openings at No. 14 have shallow brick heads and brick sills. Upper windows are small sashes under segmental heads in altered openings, with a tall round‑headed sash at the left of the first floor. Brick bands mark the first and second floors. At the back of the carriageway are slim iron gates with Art Nouveau patterns.

=== Interior ===
The ground floor of No. 10 has a stair hall with simple cornice work and an open staircase, with shaped tread ends, turned balusters and a curved handrail. The stairwell is panelled to pilaster height, and the stair window has a splayed recess with a seat.

On the first floor, the landing has a decorative plaster ceiling, and the door surrounds are panelled. The front room includes a six‑panel door, fluted architraves, shutters and an ornate ceiling with foliate motifs and a shelf running around the walls. The rear room has a panelled door, dado rail and a moulded fireplace, with an early-18th‑century door to a small closet.

A later staircase leads to the second floor. The front and rear rooms to the left have coffered ceilings; the front room has a plain fireplace, and the rear room one similar to the room below, along with a three‑panel door to a fireside closet. A three‑panel door on the landing leads to the attic, which has lime‑ash floors.

The interior of No. 12 contains moulded stonework from a 15th‑century doorway, thought to have come from the former Augustinian Friary.

Most original features within No. 14 remain. The rear ground floor has panelling, a fireplace and shutters, and a long staircase rises to the first floor.

The first floor has a rear room with complete early-18th‑century panelling, fireplace, shutters, doors and plaster coving. The landing has round‑headed doorways with moulded surrounds and keystones, linked by ramped dado panelling. The main front room has plaster coving, shutters and a round‑headed doorway; the smaller front room has its corner fireplace, dado panelling and panelled doors.

The original staircase continues to the second floor, with two balusters per tread, a moulded handrail and matching dado panelling. The second‑floor rooms retain original doors, corner fireplaces and coving. A small stair leads to the attic.

== See also ==
- Grade II* listed buildings in the City of York
- Listed buildings in York (within the city walls, northern part)
