= 3 St Helen's Square =

Listed building in York, England

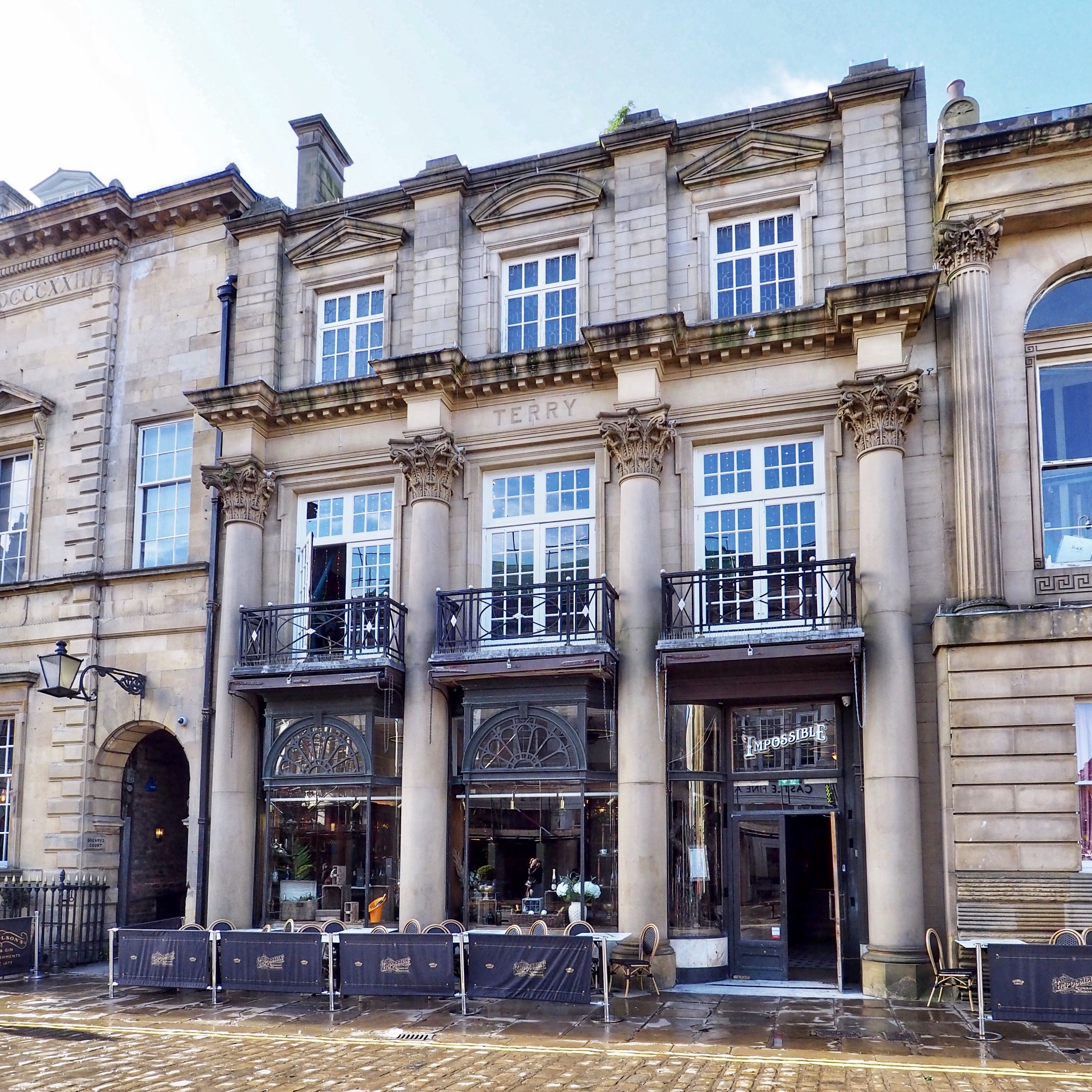
- The building in 2024
- Interactive map of the 3 St Helen's Square area

General information
- Status: Converted to hospitality use
- Type: Shop and restaurant (former)
- Location: St Helen's Square, York, England
- Coordinates: 53°57′37″N 1°05′04″W
- Year built: 1922

Design and construction
- Designations

Listed Building – Grade II
- Official name: 3, St Helen's Square
- Designated: 14 June 1954
- Reference no.: 1256797

Website
- impossibleyork.com

3 St Helen's Square is a historic building in the city centre of York, England.

In 1818 the confectionery business of Bayldon and Berry had a shop at 3 St Helen's Square. In 1828 the company became Terry's of York, and later in the century the firm added a restaurant to the building. In 1922 the building was demolished and reconstructed to a design by Lewis Wade, with a ballroom added on the top floor. External events were also catered from the premises, including the 1961 wedding of Prince Edward, Duke of Kent, to Katharine Worsley.

In 1974, the building was Grade II listed. The shop and restaurant closed in 1981, and the premises became a shop for the National Railway Museum. It later served as a branch of Swarovski jewellers, then as a Carluccio's restaurant. Since 2020 it has housed the Impossible WonderBar.

The building has two storeys and an attic. It is constructed of stone, with bronze framing around its shopfront and windows. Its front is three bays wide and has Corinthian columns. A frieze above the first floor is inscribed "TERRY".

== See also ==
- Listed buildings in York (within the city walls, northern part)
