= 7 St Sampson's Square =

Listed building in York, England

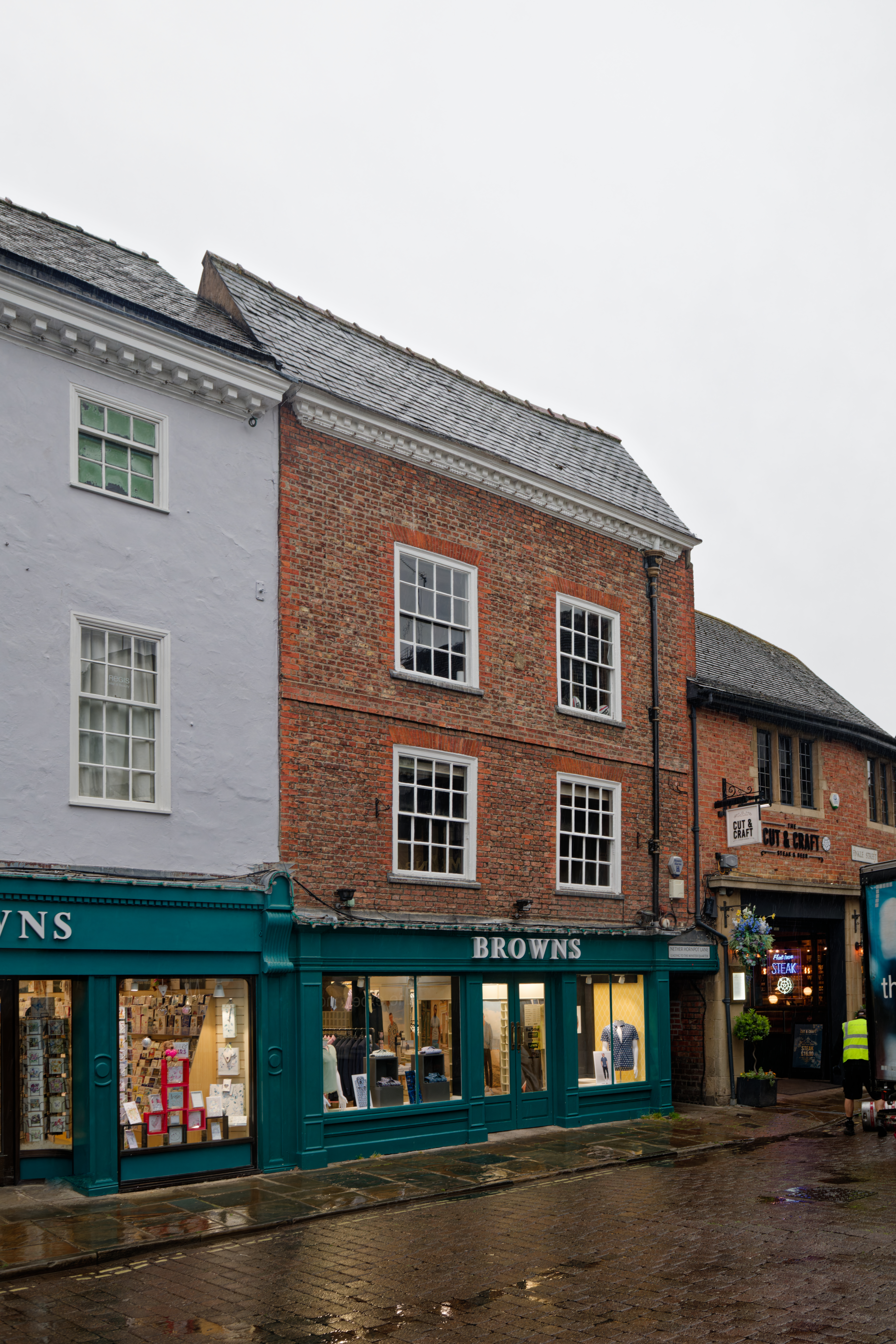
- The building in 2024
- Interactive map of the 7 St Sampson's Square area
- Former names: Punch Bowl

General information
- Type: House, now part of department store
- Location: St Sampson's Square, York, England
- Coordinates: 53°57′36″N 1°04′56″W
- Year built: Early 16th century (probable)
- Renovated: Early 18th century (altered and refronted); Early and late 19th century (altered); 20th century (shopfront and altered)

Design and construction
- Designations

Listed Building – Grade II*
- Official name: 7, St Sampsons Square
- Designated: 19 August 1971
- Reference no.: 1256731

7 St Sampson's Square is a Grade II* listed building on St Sampson's Square in the city of York, England. It originated as a house, probably in the early 16th century, and its front was rebuilt in the early 18th century after earlier alterations to the upper floors. By 1804 it was recorded as the Punch Bowl public house, and the building was later adapted through the 19th and 20th centuries as it became part of a department store. The site was added to the Central Historic Core conservation area in 1968. It is now one of several adjoining buildings occupied by the department store chain Browns of York.

== History ==
The building originated as a house, probably in the early 16th century. The front was rebuilt in the early 18th century after the upper floors were altered. By 1804 the building was recorded under the name the Punch Bowl public house. Further changes were made during the early and later 19th century as the premises were adapted, and it was incorporated into a department store. The shopfront and additional alterations date from the 20 century.

In 1968 the site was included within the newly established Central Historic Core conservation area, and on 19 August 1971, No. 7 was designated a Grade II* listed building. It is one of several adjoining buildings now occupied by the department store chain Browns of York.

== Architecture ==
The building was originally timber‑framed but later given a new front in buff‑orange brick. The roof was slated at the front and finished with pantiles at the back. It was laid out two bays wide and two bays deep, with a small staircase wing added at the rear. By the time the present shopfront was formed, an archway had been included at the right‑hand end. The upper floors were fitted with 16‑pane sash windows, set under flat brick arches, and a raised brick band was added below the top storey. The eaves were finished with a decorative timber cornice, and a rainwater head was fixed near the right‑hand side. A Yorkshire Insurance firemark was placed between the second‑floor windows.

=== Interior ===
Inside, the staircase was fitted with a solid side, rounded balusters, square posts with attached half‑balusters, and a substantial moulded handrail. Much of the original timber structure remains, including braced posts and exposed studded walls on the upper floors, with former window openings now blocked in the second floor and attic partitions. The roof was built with trusses that have braced uprights and collar beams, with additional bracing to the purlins.

== See also ==
- Grade II* listed buildings in the City of York
- Listed buildings in York (within the city walls, northern part)
