= Blake Street (York) =

Street in York, England

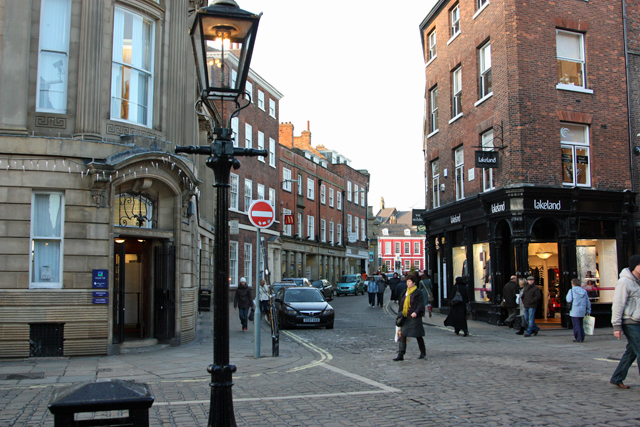
- View north on Blake Street, from St Helen's Square
- Location within York
- Location: York, England
- Coordinates: 53.9609°N 1.0847°W
- North end: Museum Street; Duncombe Place; St Leonard's Place
- South end: St Helen's Square

Blake Street is a road in the city centre of York, in England.

== History ==
The area occupied by the street lay within the walls of Roman Eboracum, but the route was not established until later. The Blake Street Hoard, a coin hoard of 35 silver denarii dating to the first century AD was found here in 1975.

The York Civic Trust claims that it emerged in the Anglian period, as a shortcut between the Porta Principalis Dextra and the Porta Praetoria, now St Helen's Square and Bootham Bar.

The street was first recorded in the 1150s. There are three main theories of the origin of its name: that "Blake" comes from the words for "white" or "bleaching", or from the Viking name "Bleiki". The church of St Wilfrid, Blake Street, was first mentioned in the 1140s and lay in the middle of the western side of the street. It was demolished in 1585, and for religious purposes, the street thereafter fell into the parish of St Michael le Belfrey, although the civil parish survived until 1900.

The main entrance to St Leonard's Hospital lay opposite the northern end of the street, and by 1215, it owned several properties on the street. A survey of 1230 shows that Whitby Abbey owned several others.

During the Georgian period, the street was the departure point for stagecoaches to the north. In 1732, the York Assembly Rooms opened on the west side of the street, and these survive. An open area to their north was created in 1735, and this was sometimes known as "Blake's Square". In 1827, baths were opened on the street.

The street now forms part of the city's central shopping area. It was pedestrianised in 2020.

== Architecture and layout ==
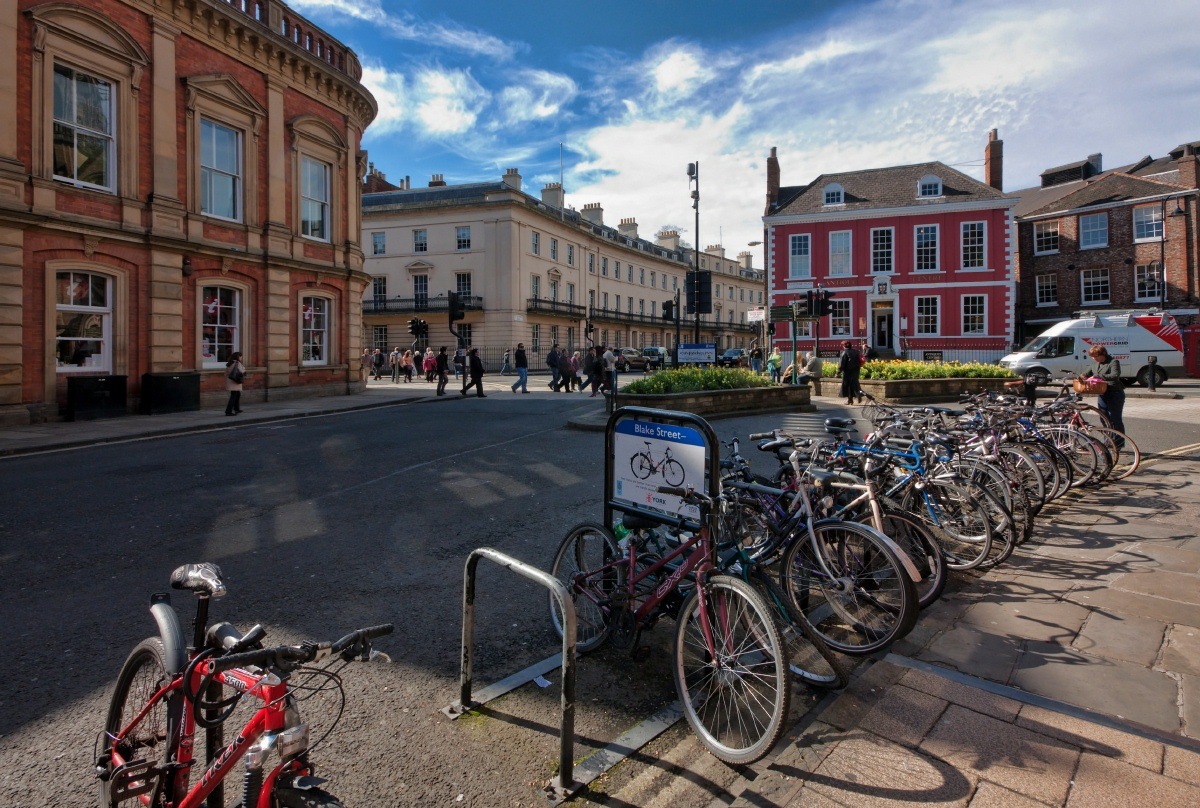
The northern end of Blake Street, looking north

The street runs north from St Helen's Square to the junction of Museum Street, Duncombe Place, and St Leonard's Place. Until the creation of St Helen's Square, in 1745, it started at a junction with Stonegate, while a footpath across the graveyard of St Helen, Stonegate, connected it to Davygate.

Other than the Assembly Rooms, the most notable building on the west side of the street is 18 Blake Street, built in 1789, while on the east side, 1-5 Blake Street has 16th century origins, 11 and 13 Blake Street were both built about 1750, and 15-21 were built by Thomas Haxby in 1773. 23 and 25 Blake Street are both late-18th century.
