= Blake Street Hoard =

Coin hoard found in York, England

The Blake Street hoard is a Romano-British coin hoard.

== The hoard ==
=== Discovery and context ===
The hoard was discovered during excavation in 1975 by Richard Hall at Blake Street, York, in the praetentura of the Roman legionary fortress of Eboracum. The hoard was located in the foundations of a building dating to the second-century AD.

33 of the coins are in the collection of the Yorkshire Museum and two are in the British Museum.

=== Contents ===
The hoard contains 35 denarii from the Roman Republican and early-Imperial periods. The latest coin in the hoard is of the Emperor Vespasian.
