= Roman Bath, York =

Listed pub in York, England

The Roman Bath
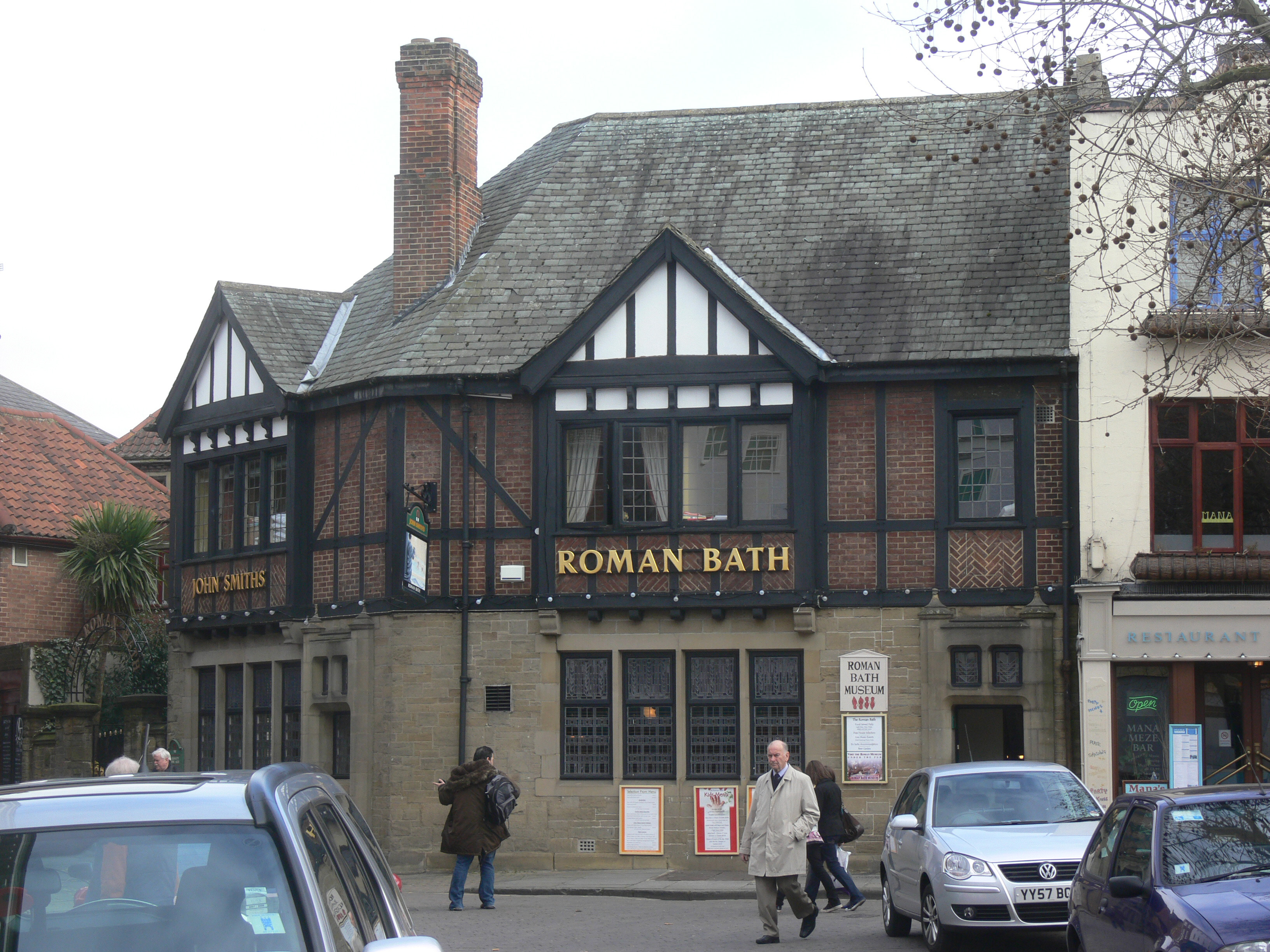
- The Roman Bath from St Sampson's Square

General information
- Type: Public house and Roman ruins
- Architectural style: Tudor Revival
- Location: 9 St Sampson's Square, York, England
- Coordinates: 53.9599°N 1.0819°W
- Year built: 1929–1931; 95 years ago

Design and construction
- Designations

Listed Building – Grade II*
- Official name: The Roman Bath public house
- Designated: 14 June 1954
- Reference no.: 1256732

Website
- Official website

The Roman Bath is a Grade II* listed public house on St Sampson's Square in the city of York, England. It is built above an ancient Roman bath house. The remains were uncovered during building work when the present pub was erected between 1929 and 1931 replacing an inn. The exterior has Tudor Revival features including applied half-timbering. The pub is however more notable for the Roman remains which can be viewed inside.

The bath house apparently served the military personnel of Eboracum (Roman York). Not only was the facility in Eboracum's fortress (built in the 1st century AD to house a legion of about 5,000 men), but also tiles have been discovered at the bath house site which are marked with the identity of specific legions. The Ninth may have constructed the facility. The last attested activity of the Ninth in Britain is in AD 108.

Baths dating from the 2nd and 3rd centuries AD have been excavated at Tanner Row on the other side of the River Ouse: these are believed to have served the civilian population of York.

== Access and conservation ==
The pub is a Grade II* listed building. It was listed in 1954, relatively early for a pub from the interwar period. This suggests that the existence of Roman ruins was the main reason for listing.

The Roman remains may be visited. The York Roman Bath Museum is open daily from 11am–4pm, £4.50 adults and concession rates apply.

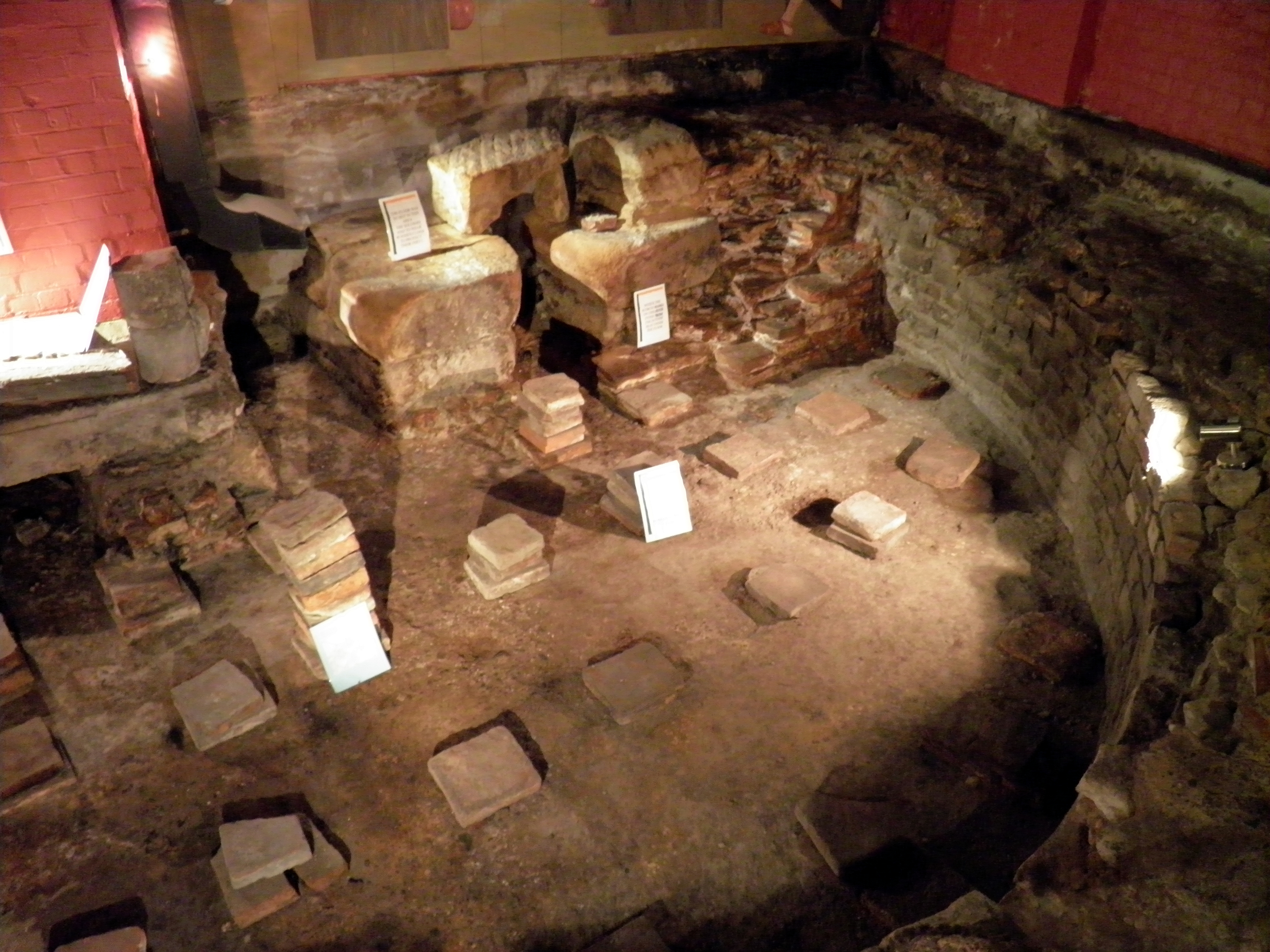
The Caldarium

The caldarium and some other features of the baths are visible. Some of the other facilities would have been outside the corner site occupied by the pub: much of the baths have yet to be excavated. The site as a whole is protected through its location within the walled city of York, designated as an 'Area of Archaeological Importance' (AAI) under Part 2 of the 1979 Ancient Monuments and Archaeological Areas Act.

== Other examples ==
There are other examples in the UK of Roman baths serving forts, for example the infrastructure at Caerleon, also a legionary fortress, where there was a frigidarium, tepidarium and caldarium, as well as an open-air swimming pool.

The Six Bells in St Albans is also built above a bath house, but the Roman remains are not on display.

== See also ==
- Grade II* listed buildings in the City of York
- Listed buildings in York (within the city walls, northern part)
