= Lendal =

Street in York, England

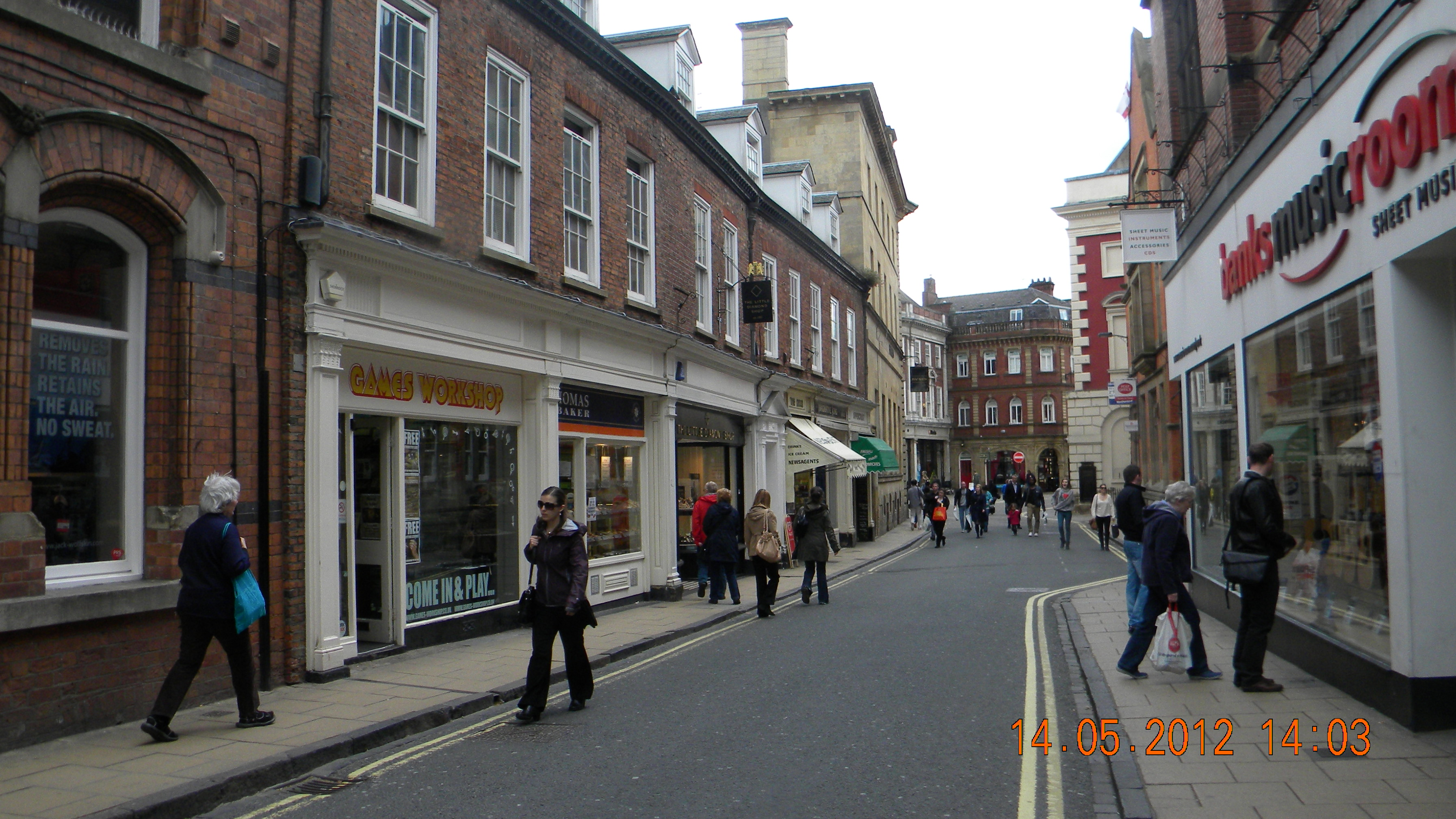
- View from Lendal towards St Helen's Square
- Location within York
- Former name: Old Coney Street
- Location: York, England
- Coordinates: 53.9604°N 1.0854°W
- North west end: Museum Street
- South east end: St Helen's Square

Lendal /ˈlɛndəl/ is a street in the city centre of York, England.

== History ==
The street was first mentioned in the 1380s, when it was known as Aldeconyngstrete (Old Coney Street). However, by 1641, it had become known as "Lendal", a contraction of "St Leonard's Hill". This "hill" was the quay on the River Ouse belonging to St Leonard's Hospital, which lay at the north-western end of the street.

Most of the south-western side of the street was occupied by the Augustinian Friary, which was dissolved in 1538. St Wilfrid's Church lay on the north-east side until it was demolished later in the 16th century. In about 1710, the city's main post office was built on the south-west side, while the large Judges' Lodgings house was built on the north-east side by Clifton Wintringham about 1720.

For 24 years, a statue of Napoleon outside a tobacconist's shop on Lendal was a local landmark. York Post Office remained on the street until 2019, when it moved to Coney Street. Banks, located on Lendal, is the oldest music shop in Britain, having been founded in 1756.

== Layout and architecture ==
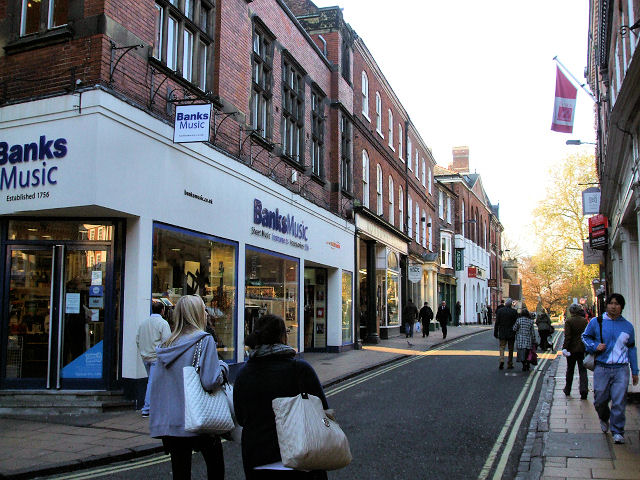
View north-west along Lendal

The street runs north-west from St Helen's Square to Museum Street, and south of the square it continues as Coney Street. Museum Street was formerly known as Back Lendal, and both Lendal Tower on the York city walls and Lendal Bridge lie on Museum Street, near the junction with Lendal.

The Grade I-listed Judges' Lodgings stands at No. 9 on the north-east side of the street, while other listed buildings include the 19th-century Lendal House at No. 11, and Nos. 13–23, a terrace built in the mid-18th century. On the south-west side, No. 2 was originally a Congregational chapel, built in 1816 by Pritchett and Watson. No. 8 was built in the 17th century as Lendal House, although it was refronted around 1840. Nos. 4A and 4B, behind it, are its former boat house and stable, and incorporate a surviving part of the friary wall. The Grade II*-listed terrace at Nos. 10–14 was built in the early 18th century, while the former post office at No. 22, and Lendal Cellars pub, at No. 26 down an alleyway, are also listed.
