= Three Cranes =

Listed pub in York, England

- The pub in 2026
- Interactive map of the Three Cranes area

General information
- Type: Public house
- Location: 11 St Sampson's Square, York, England
- Coordinates: 53.9598°N 1.0817°W
- Year built: Mid-18th century
- Renovated: Late 19th century (altered); 1933 (refurbished)
- Owner: Heineken UK

Design and construction
- Designations

Listed Building – Grade II
- Official name: The Three Cranes public house
- Designated: 14 March 1997
- Reference no.: 1256733

The Three Cranes is a Grade II listed public house on St Sampson's Square in York, England. Built in the mid‑18th century, it was altered in the late 19th century, and refurbished in 1933. The site was incorporated into the Central Historic Core conservation area in 1968. As of June 2025, the freehold is owned by Heineken UK.

== History ==
The building is a mid‑18th‑century public house on St Sampson's Square, altered in the late 19th century, when the back wall of the extension along Three Cranes Passage was rebuilt, and refurbished in 1933.

The tiled pub sign in 2024

Although the large sign on the façade shows three crane birds, this is thought to be a later visual reinterpretation rather than the original name. The name is instead believed to refer to three lifting cranes that once stood at the rear of the building when the square was known as Thursday Market. By 1592, cloth was sold there each Friday, and the cranes were used for loading and unloading goods.

In 1968 the site was included within the newly established Central Historic Core conservation area, and on 14 March 1997 the Three Cranes was designated a Grade II listed building.

As of June 2025, the freehold is owned by Heineken UK.

== Architecture ==
The ground floor is set out with timber and areas of glazed tile, while the upper storeys are coated in a textured render that has been painted, with simple corner details and a shaped band running beneath the roof. A wing extends to the rear, built in dark orange brick, and the roof carries a rebuilt chimney and a covering of Westmorland slate. The layout is arranged around a central entrance with the wing projecting behind.

The front rises three storeys and has two windows. At street level, the inn frontage sits between timber uprights with a narrow band and cornice above. An archway to a passage stands at the left, and a panelled door occupies the centre, flanked by two three‑light windows with gently arched heads and shaped sills. The upper floors contain four‑pane sash windows set in slightly raised frames with moulded sills, and between the first‑floor windows is a decorative tile panel showing the Three Cranes within a shaped surround. At the rear, most openings in the wing have been altered over time, though one original 16‑pane sash window with a moulded sill remains.

== See also ==
- Listed buildings in York (within the city walls, northern part)
