= Yorkshire Insurance Company =

English insurance company (1824–1967)

- Type: Public
- Industry: Insurance
- Founded: 1824
- Defunct: 1967
- Fate: Acquired by General Accident
- Headquarters: 1 St Helen’s Square, York

The Yorkshire Insurance Company was an English insurance company that existed from 1824 to 1967. The company was acquired by General Accident.

== History ==
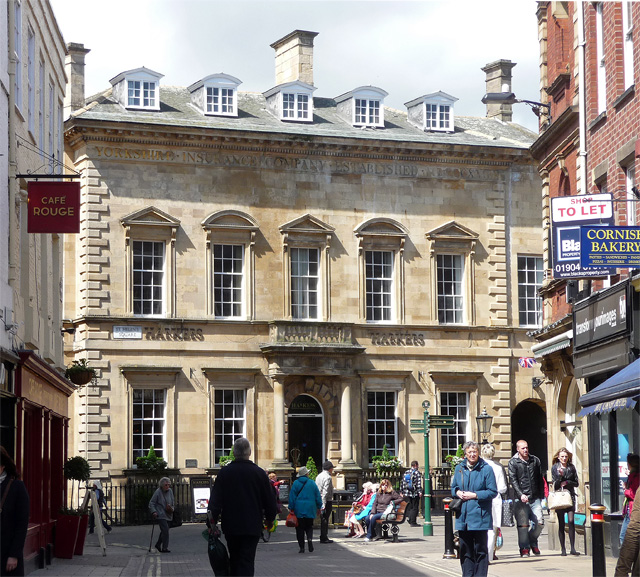
The 1847 headquarters building on St Helen's Square in York, designed by George Townsend Andrews

The company was founded in 1824, in York, as the Yorkshire Fire and Life Insurance Company. Its objects were initially "to effect insurance against loss by fire and on lives and survivorships and the sale and purchase of annuities and reversions and the endowment of children". In November 1824, the company purchased a fire engine, and from 1830 until 1876, it operated the fire brigade for the city of York. In 1847, it constructed its headquarters building on St Helen's Square in the city. In 1908, the company adopted its final name, and registered as a limited company.

The company took over the following insurance companies:

- 1907: National Assurance Company of Ireland
- 1912: London and Provincial Marine and General Insurance Company
- 1913: Scottish Boiler and General Insurance Company
- 1914: Guarantee Society
- 1918: Ulster Marine Insurance Company
- 1920: National Safe Deposit and Trustee Company
- 1921: Lancashire and Yorkshire Reversionary Interest Company
- 1922: Commercial Insurance Company of Ireland
- 1955: Farmers' Finance and Insurance Office
- 1961: Celtic Insurance Company
- 1963: Scottish Insurance Corporation

In 1967, the majority of the company's shares were bought by General Accident, which purchased the remainder in 1968. Following this, General Accident's life insurance section, General Life, was renamed "Yorkshire-General Life", which it remained until 1985.
