= Lendal Chapel =

Listed building in York, England

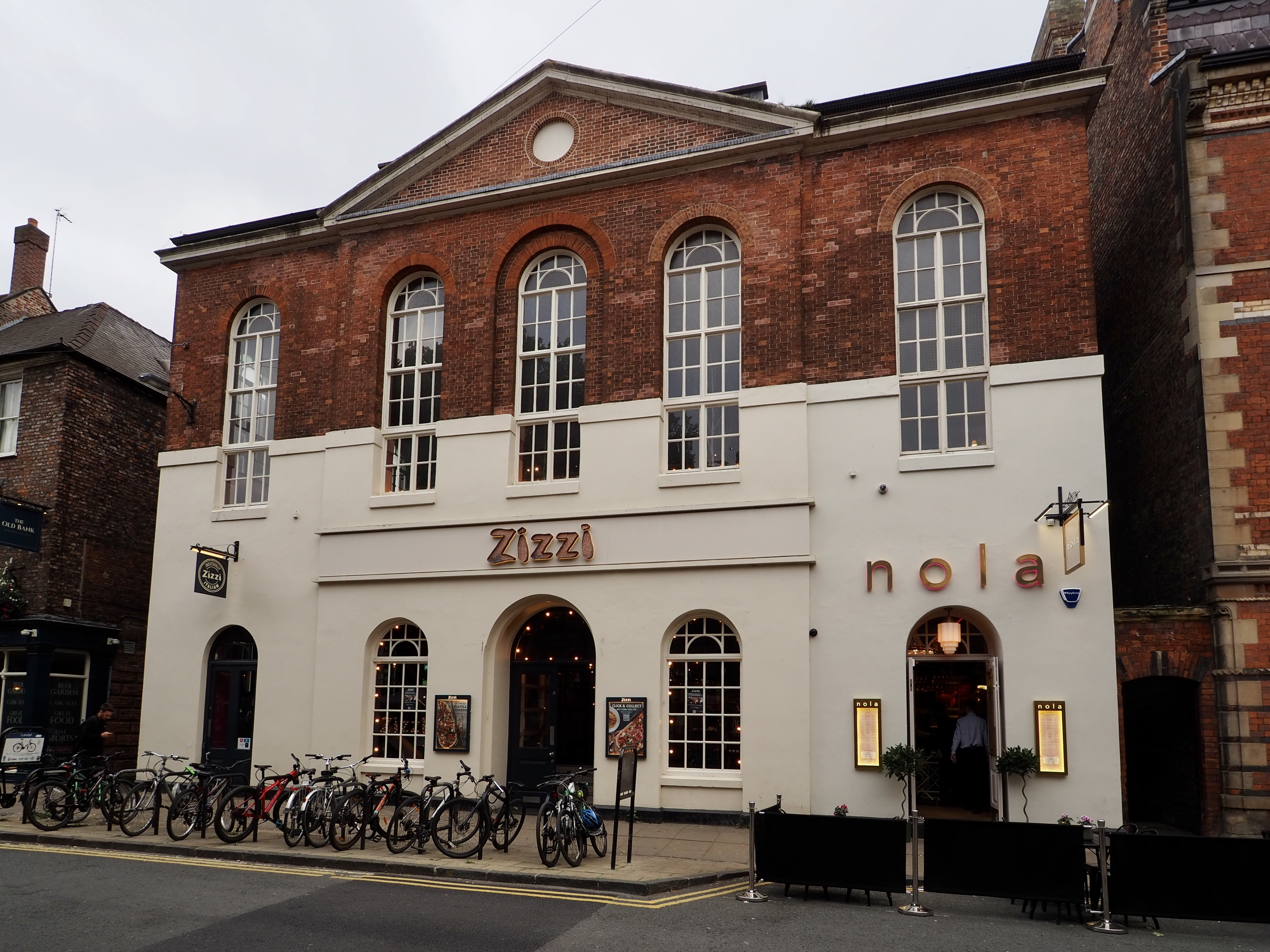
- The building in 2021
- Alternative names: 2 Lendal

General information
- Status: Converted to commercial use
- Type: Congregational chapel (former)
- Location: Lendal, York, England
- Coordinates: 53°57′38″N 1°05′10″W
- Year built: 1816; 210 years ago
- Renovated: 1929 (converted and altered)

Design and construction
- Designations

Listed Building – Grade II
- Official name: 2, Lendal
- Designated: 24 June 1983
- Reference no.: 1257482

The Lendal Chapel, also known as 2 Lendal, is a historic building on Lendal, a street in the city centre of York, England.

The Countess of Huntingdon's Connexion founded a church in York in 1749. A group split away and established the Grape Lane Chapel in 1781, and in 1796 part of that group founded a chapel on Jubbergate. Many of the worshippers were Congregationalists, and in 1814 the chapel was taken over by the West Riding Itinerant Society, which aimed to consolidate the faith in the region. The group purchased a site on Lendal and constructed a new church, completed in 1816. The leading figure in the congregation was the architect James Pigott Pritchett, who designed the new building, which cost more than £3,000. James Parsons was appointed pastor and served for nearly 50 years. The church thrived, and in 1839 the larger Salem Chapel was built on St Saviour's Place; 368 members, including Parsons, moved to the new church, while 79 remained at Lendal. This membership stagnated, and there was a rapid turnover of ministers. The building was restored in 1902 but closed in 1929, with the congregation moving to Salem Chapel and then to the New Lendal Congregational Church on Burton Stone Lane. The building was then converted for commercial use, with occupants including shops, a restaurant, and an amusement arcade.

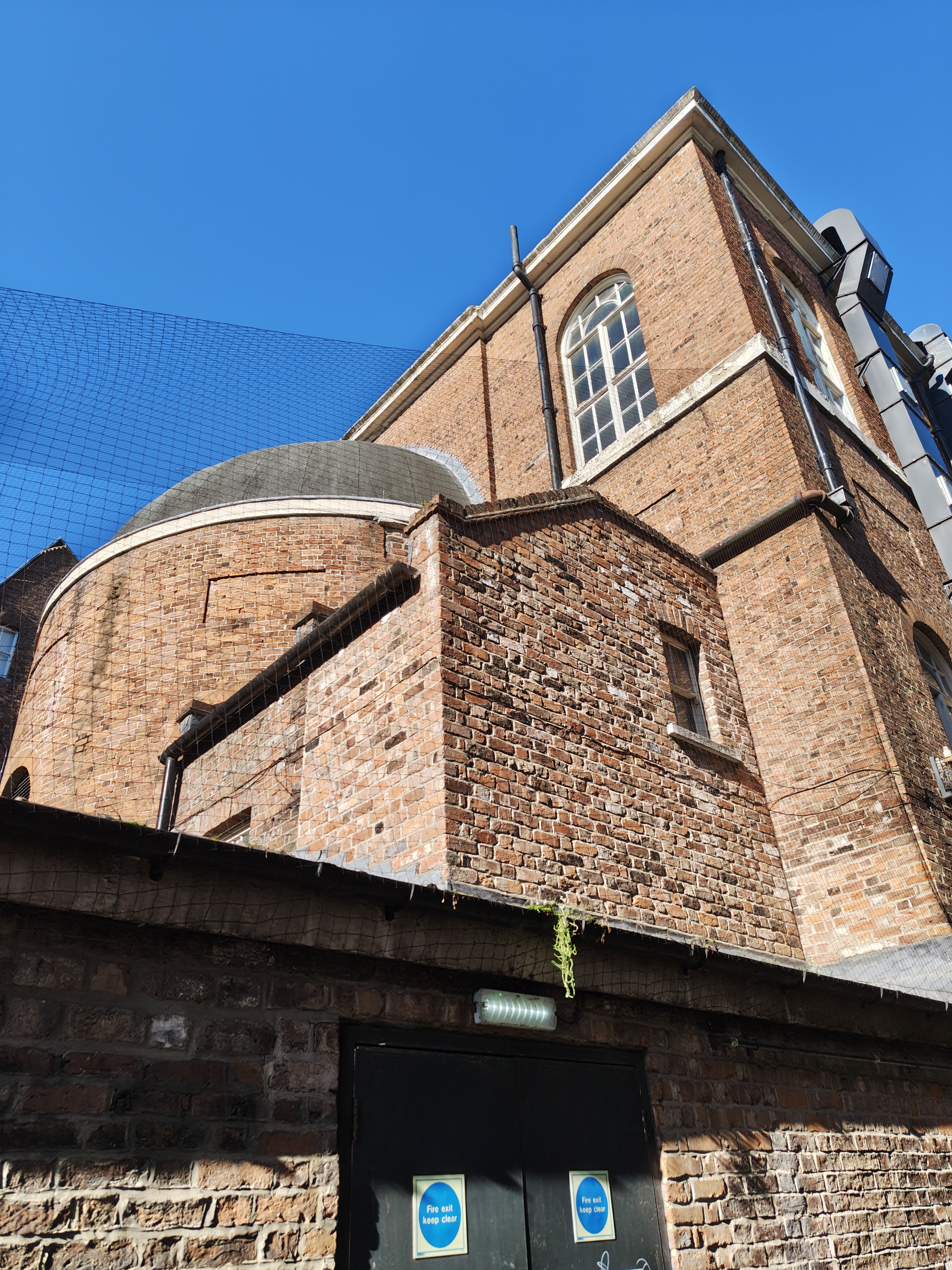
Rear of the building

The orange-brick building has been Grade II listed since 1983. It has two storeys with a basement, and the front is five bays wide, the central three projecting forward and topped with a pediment. The ground floor is rendered, described by Nikolaus Pevsner as "cruelly spoiled". There is a timber cornice and a pyramidal slate roof. The windows and doors have round heads, and the central main entrance has a hood. At the rear, a semi-circular apse projects from the three central bays.

== See also ==
- Listed buildings in York (within the city walls, northern part)
