= 1–5 Blake Street =

Listed terrace in York, England

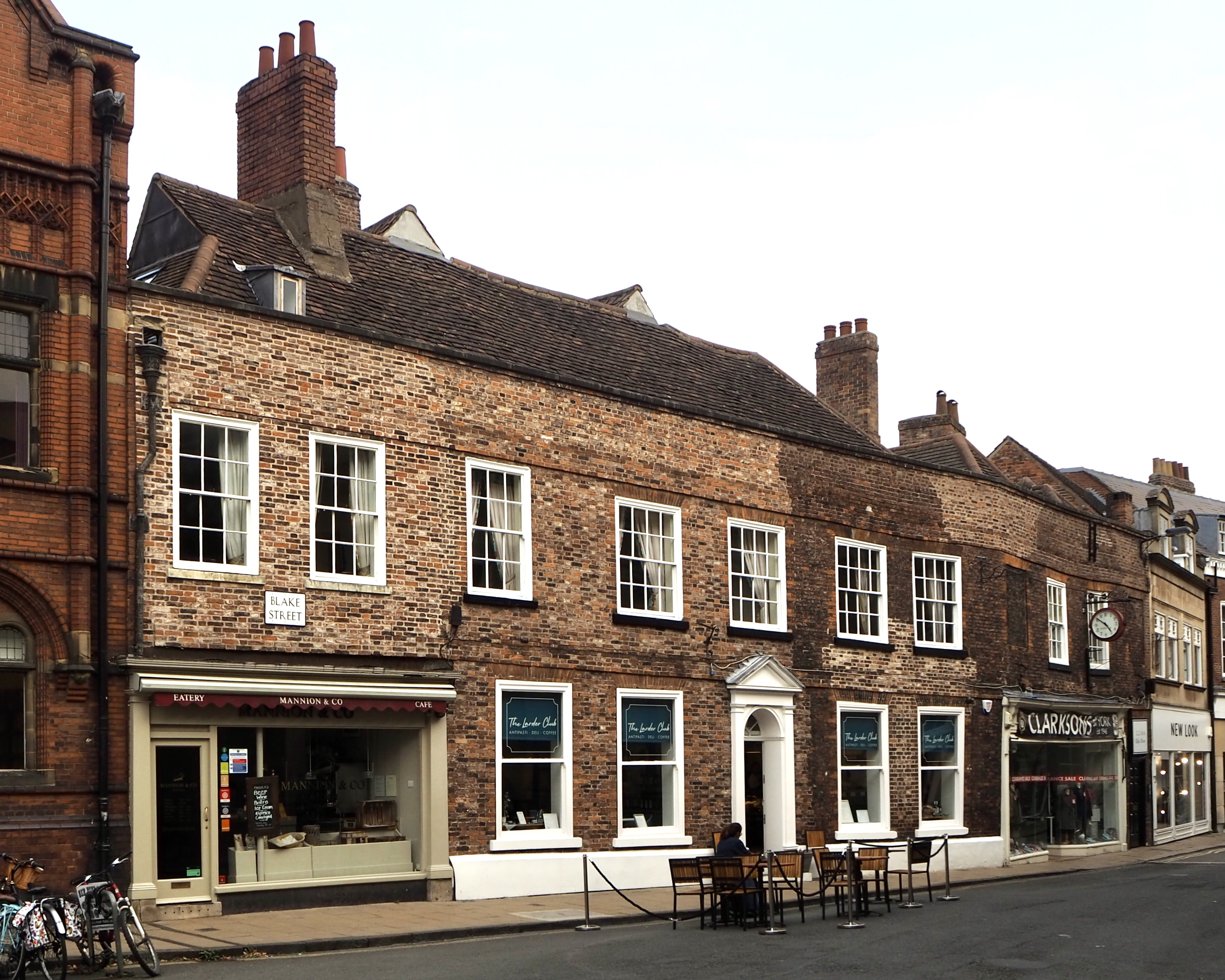
- The terrace in 2020
- Interactive map of the 1–5 Blake Street area

General information
- Location: Blake Street, York, England
- Coordinates: 53°57′40″N 1°05′05″W
- Year built: 16th century
- Renovated: Early 18th century (remodelled and extended); 19th and 20th century (altered)

Design and construction
- Designations

Listed Building – Grade II
- Official name: Numbers 1, 3 and 5 and wall attached to rear of number 1
- Designated: 14 June 1954
- Reference no.: 1259514

1–5 Blake Street is a Grade II listed terrace in the city centre of York, England.

The current terrace originated in the 16th century as a large, timber-framed building, with four parallel ranges, gabled to the street and to the rear, covering what is now Nos. 1 and 3. This was probably a two-storey building, and is described by the Royal Commission on the Historical Monuments of England as having been "exceptional in the city in its degree of elaboration". To the rear of the building was a yard, now fully enclosed, with a Magnesian Limestone wall which appears to have been built from stone shaped in the 12th century.

In the 17th century, the northernmost range was extended to project to the rear, and late in the century, an attic storey was added to part of No. 1. The building was remodelled in the second quarter of the 18th century, with the a new front to Blake Street built in brick, the roof largely replaced, and a new staircase added at the rear. The street may have been widened at this point, so the front may be on an entirely new alignment. No. 5 was built at the same time, with a front in the same style, and it may also include some remains of an earlier timber-framed building. Repeated alterations in the 19th and 20th century include further extensions to the rear of the terrace, new shop fronts for Nos. 1 and 5 and the removal of some internal walls, but the Georgian windows survive, unusually, in No. 3, even at ground floor level.

The Blake Street facade is 11 bays long, has two storeys, and there are nine sash windows at first floor level. There is a drainpipe head dated 1765. Inside, the first floor of No. 1 has some 17th-century panelling, which may have been moved from elsewhere. No. 3 has a 17th-century door frame on the ground floor, and a late 17th-century staircase. Its first floor is combined with that of No. 5. One room has early-17th-century panelling, and there are several Georgian fireplaces and cornices. No. 5 has a 19th-century domed ceiling with a rooflight which previously lit a spiral staircase, later removed.

== See also ==
- Listed buildings in York (within the city walls, northern part)
