= Sir Clifton Wintringham, 1st Baronet =

English military physician

Sir Clifton Wintringham, 1st Baronet (bapt. 20 January 1710 – 9 January 1794) was an English military physician.

== Life ==
He was the eldest son of physician Clifton Wintringham senior, and was educated at Trinity College, Cambridge. He had a distinguished medical career, being elected Fellow of the Royal Society in 1742, and becoming joint military physician to the forces, with John Pringle, in 1756. He was also physician in ordinary to George III, from 1762 when he was knighted. He was created baronet on 7 November 1774.

Escutcheon of the Wintringham baronets of Dover Street

Joseph Robertson, a friend, edited Wintringham's De morbis quibusdam commentarii (1782), and dedicated to him An Essay on Punctuation. A memorial to Wintringham, by Thomas Banks, was erected in Westminster Abbey, marking the high standing with which he had been seen during life.

== Notes ==
Baronetage of Great Britain
New creation	Baronet (of Dover Street); 1774–1794	Extinct
Preceded by Jennings-Clerke baronets	Wintringham baronets of Dover Street; 7 November 1774	Succeeded by Duntze baronets
