= St Helen's Square =

Open space in York, England

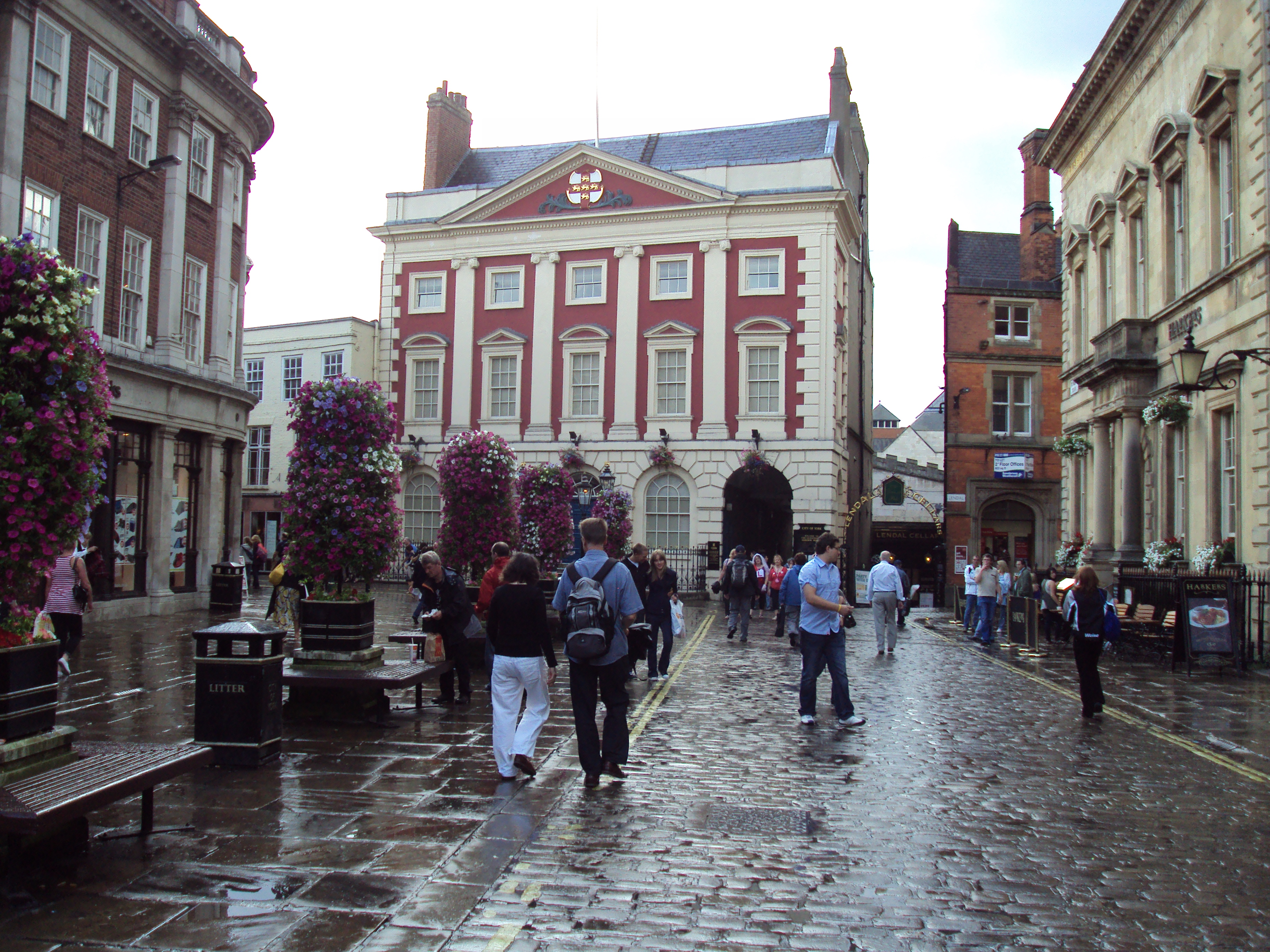
- St Helen's Square, looking south-west
- Location within York
- Maintained by: City of York
- Location: York, England
- Coordinates: 53°57′37″N 1°05′04″W
- North: Blake Street; Stonegate
- East: Davygate
- South: Coney Street
- West: Lendal

Construction
- Completion: 1745; 280 years ago

St Helen's Square is an open space in the city centre of York, England.

== History ==
During the Roman era, Eboracum's south-western gate, the porta praetoria, lay where the square is now.

Until the mid-18th century much of the space was occupied by the graveyard of St Helen's, Stonegate. The streets of Stonegate and Davygate ran either side of the graveyard, meeting Coney Street at a junction known as Cuckold's Corner. In addition a footpath ran across the graveyard, linking Davygate with the junction of Stonegate and Blake Street.

In 1745 St Helen's was given a plot of land on Davygate for use as a new graveyard and the old graveyard was paved over to form St Helen's Square. In the early 20th century the square was enlarged to the south-east, giving it a more regular, rectangular, shape.

The York Tavern, built on the square in 1770, became one of two main departure points for stagecoaches to London. By 1818 Terry's had set up its shop on the square and it remained there, later also operating as a restaurant, until 1980.

In winter the square is now the location of a large Christmas tree and the city's Christmas lights are turned on in a ceremony held in the square. The square is also a popular location for demonstrations and rallies. 0

== Layout and architecture ==
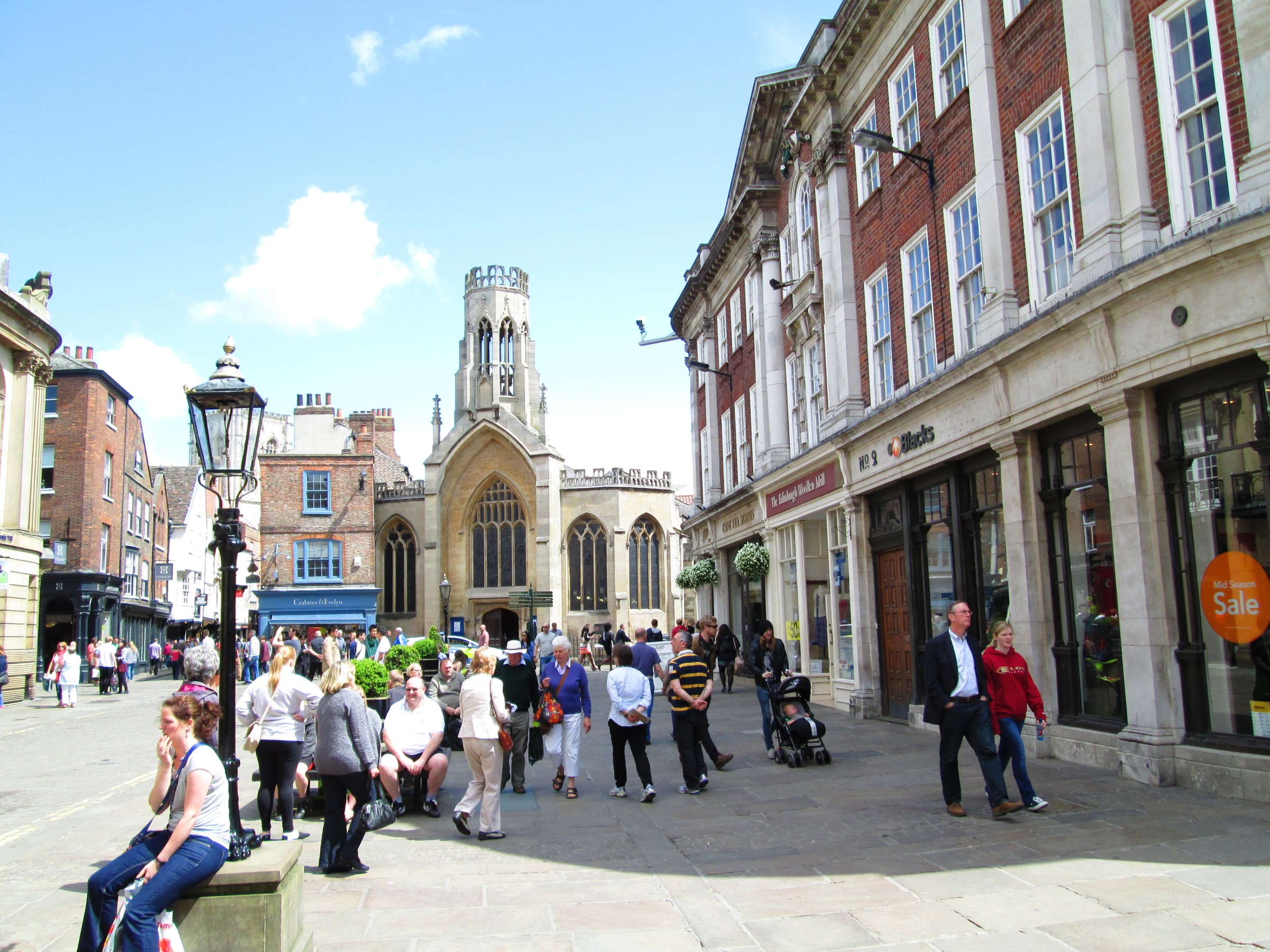
The square, looking north-east

The square is an important junction, with Coney Street leading from its southern corner, Lendal from the west, both Blake Street and Stonegate from the north and Davygate from the east.

The south-western side of the square is occupied by the Mansion House and there is also access to the York Guildhall, which can be seen through a gateway. On the north-western side Harkers was constructed for the Yorkshire Insurance Company, and the York County Savings Bank Building was also built in the mid-19th century for a local institution. Both are listed, as is the former Terry's building at 3 St Helen's Square. The 18th-century Number 7, on the north-eastern side, is also listed, with the remainder of this side occupied by St Helen's Church. Numbers 2-8, occupying the south-eastern side, were built in 1929 and are also listed. Part of the building is occupied by Bettys tea rooms.
