= York County Hospital =

Former hospital in England

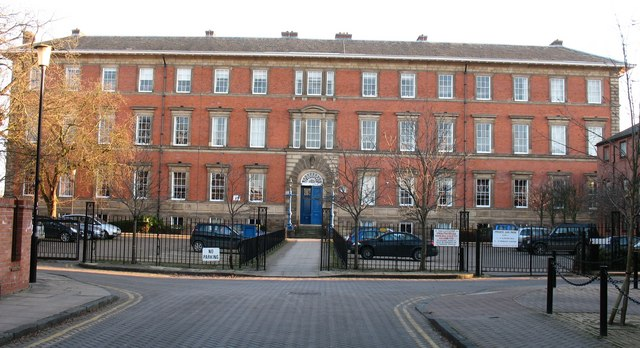
- The third incarnation of the hospital was erected in Monkgate in 1851.

- Shown in North Yorkshire

Geography
- Location: York, North Yorkshire, England, United Kingdom
- Coordinates: 53°57′46.9″N 1°04′32″W

Organisation
- Care system: Public NHS
- Type: General

History
- Founded: 1740

Links
- Lists: Hospitals in England

York County Hospital (1740–1977) was a hospital in York, England. The building, which is grade II listed, has been converted for residential use.

== History ==
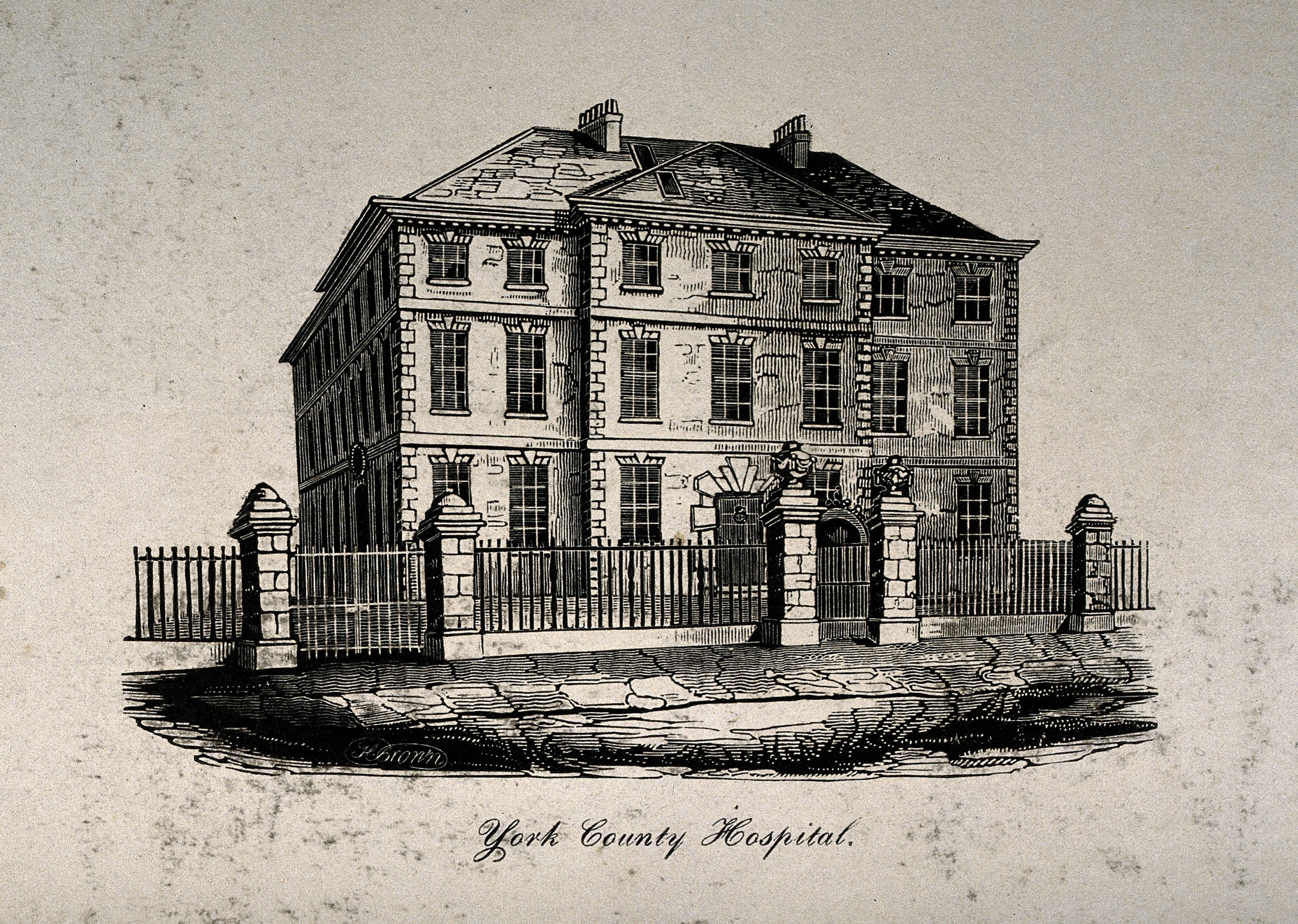
The second incarnation of the hospital was erected in Monkgate in 1745. Steel engraving by H. C Wellcome V0014646

The hospital has its origins in a small hospital established in Monkgate in April 1740. It moved to larger premises in Monkgate in 1745.

According to one account, "the benevolent Lady Hastings, who, in the year 1749, bequeathed a legacy of £500, for the relief of the diseased poor in the county of York; which fund being augmented by other contributions, the present edifice was soon after erected."

In 1840 there was a competition to design a new hospital and in 1851 the original (1745) building was demolished and replaced with a new building costing around £11,000 - £7,000 from subscriptions and £4,000 from existing funds. The new building was built behind the previous building and offered considerably more space, with one hundred beds. It was designed by J. B. and W. Atkinson.

In 1887, the hospital merged with the York Eye Institution which had been opened in 1875, but which was being rarely used. A nurses’ home was built in 1905.

York suffered a major attack on 29 April 1942, one of the Baedeker raids by the Luftwaffe. Many of the casualties, who would later go on to die, were treated at York County Hospital.

In 1977 the hospital facilities moved to York Hospital which had six hundred beds; the ante-natal clinic remained on-site until 1980. The Sainsbury's supermarket at Jewbury was then built while the hospital building, renamed County House, was used as the headquarters of Yorkshire Water before being converted for residential use.

== People linked with the hospital ==
- Francis Drake, surgeon 1740-1745
- John Burton, physician and man midwife 1740-1746
- George Stubbs, painter to the medical staff
- Clifton Wintringham senior, physician to replace John Burton 1746
