= Clifton Wintringham senior =

English medical practitioner

Clifton Wintringham senior (baptized 1689 – 1748) was an English medical practitioner, appointed Physician at York County Hospital in March 1746.

== Life ==
Wintringham was educated at Jesus College, Cambridge, and was admitted on 3 July 1711 as an Extra Licentiate of the College of Physicians, enabling him to practice medicine. He practiced in York for over 35 years, and the town house The Judges Lodgings, York was built around 1715 as his private residence. He authored several books and attended the Earl of Carlisle at nearby Castle Howard. In the period 1715 to 1730 he kept meteorological records, and notes on his patients. He later published data, one of a number of physicians of the time concerned to understand the relationship of climate and disease. In his essay "An Essay on Contagious Diseases" He presented an early theory of immunity, stating that the dilation of blood vessels during infection by smallpox prevented the disease being able to be caught again.

== Publications ==
Clifton wrote extensively on a range of medical topics, with a particular interest in the early branch of epidemiology (analysis of the distribution, patterns and determinants of health and disease control.)

- Wintringham, Clifton. (1718). A treatise of endemic diseases, wherein the different nature of airs, situations, soils, waters, diet … are mechanically explain’d and accounted for. London: printed by Grace White for Francis Hildyward. (Available at University of York Library Rare Books Collection as part of the York Medical Society Library.)
- Wintringham, Clifton. (1733). Commentarium nosolgicum, morbos epidemicos et aeris variations in urbe Eboracensi locisque vicinis, per sedecim annos grassantes complectens. Londini: impensis J. Walthoe. The first edition of this text was published in York in 1727, based on data Clifton had collected for twenty years on the death rates and epidemics of the city. The second edition followed in 1733, with a third six years later. (Both editions available at York Minster Library.) Such epidemiological surveys were rare in this period, and Wintringham was considered to be a pioneer in this branch of medical publication. Statistics collected from the York parish registers show the severity of the epidemics: typhus in 1718 – 19, measles in 1721 and 1730, and military fever in 1727.

On his death Wintringham's eldest son was instrumental in compiling two volumes of his father’s Collected Works.

- Wintringham, Clifton, (1689-1748), Wintringham, Clifton, (1710-1794). The works of the late Clifton Wintringham, physician at York, now first collected and published entire: with large additions and emendations from the original manuscripts. London: printed by G. Woodfall. (Available at University of York Library Rare Books Collection as part of the York Medical Society Library.

== Family ==
Wintringham was married twice: his first wife Elizabeth was daughter of Richard Nettleton of Earls Heath, Yorkshire. Sir Clifton Wintringham (1710–1794) was their eldest son. His second wife Katherine was daughter of John Liddell (later known as Liddell-Bright), son of Sir Henry Liddell, 3rd Baronet. Clifton Wintringham died on 15 March 1748, and was buried at St Michael-le Belfry, York.
