= Davygate =

Street in York, England

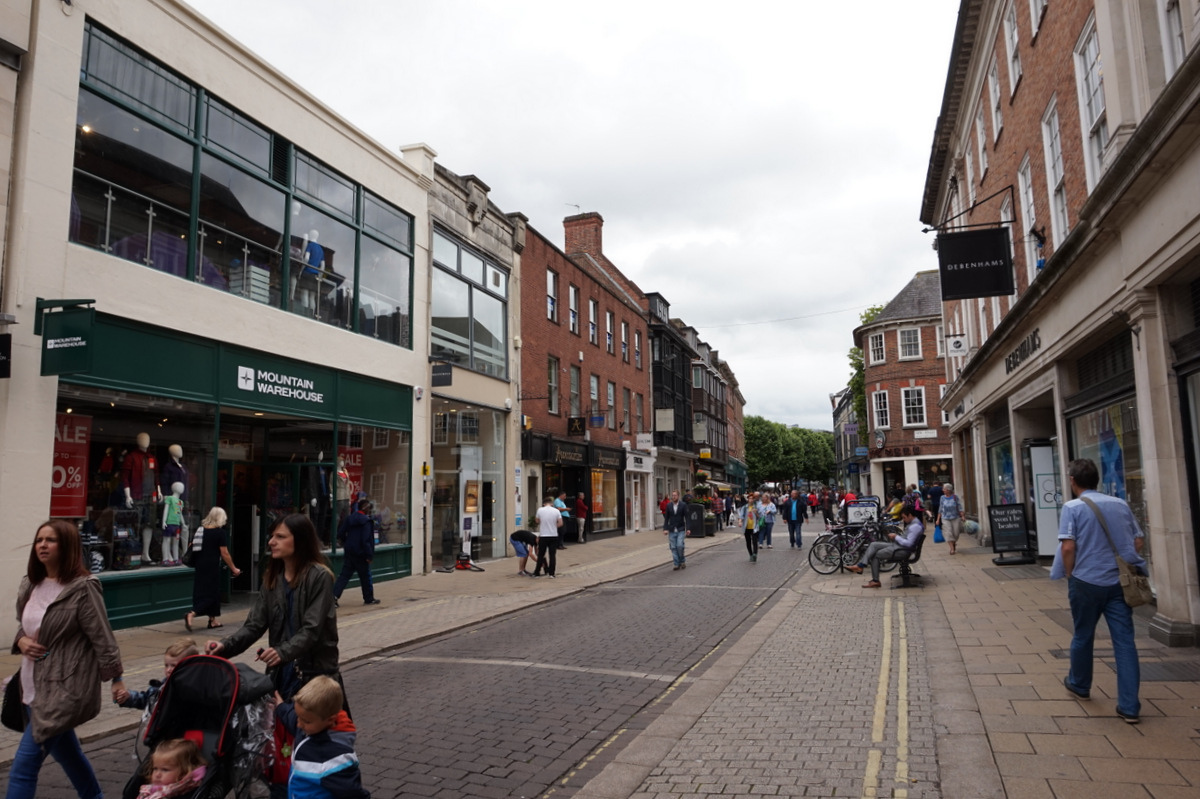
- View south on Davygate
- Location within York
- Location: York, England
- Coordinates: 53.9598°N 1.0831°W
- North west end: St Helen's Square
- Major junctions: New Street
- South east end: St Sampson's Square

Davygate is a major shopping street in the city centre of York, in England.

== History ==
During the Roman period, the site of Davygate lay just inside the city walls, and was covered by barracks. In the 12th-century, the land on which the street now lies was given to John, the King's Larderer. By 1226, it was owned by his son, David, who was living in a house on the land, which became known as Davy Hall. A street gradually developed, which became known as "Davygate", after the hall. The hall itself became the prison of the Forest of Galtres.

By the mid-16th century, the hall was regarded as a liberty, outside the jurisdiction of the city, and it had been divided into tenements, where poor artisans could live, and make and sell goods without paying taxes or adhering to quality standards. It was demolished in 1744, and the site was used partly for a new graveyard for St Helen's, Stonegate, and partly to construct New Street. St Helen's former graveyard, at the north-west end of Davygate, was paved over to create St Helen's Square.

The south-eastern end of the street was widened in 1891. It became a major shopping street, and almost all the buildings on its length have since been demolished and replaced.

== Layout and architecture ==
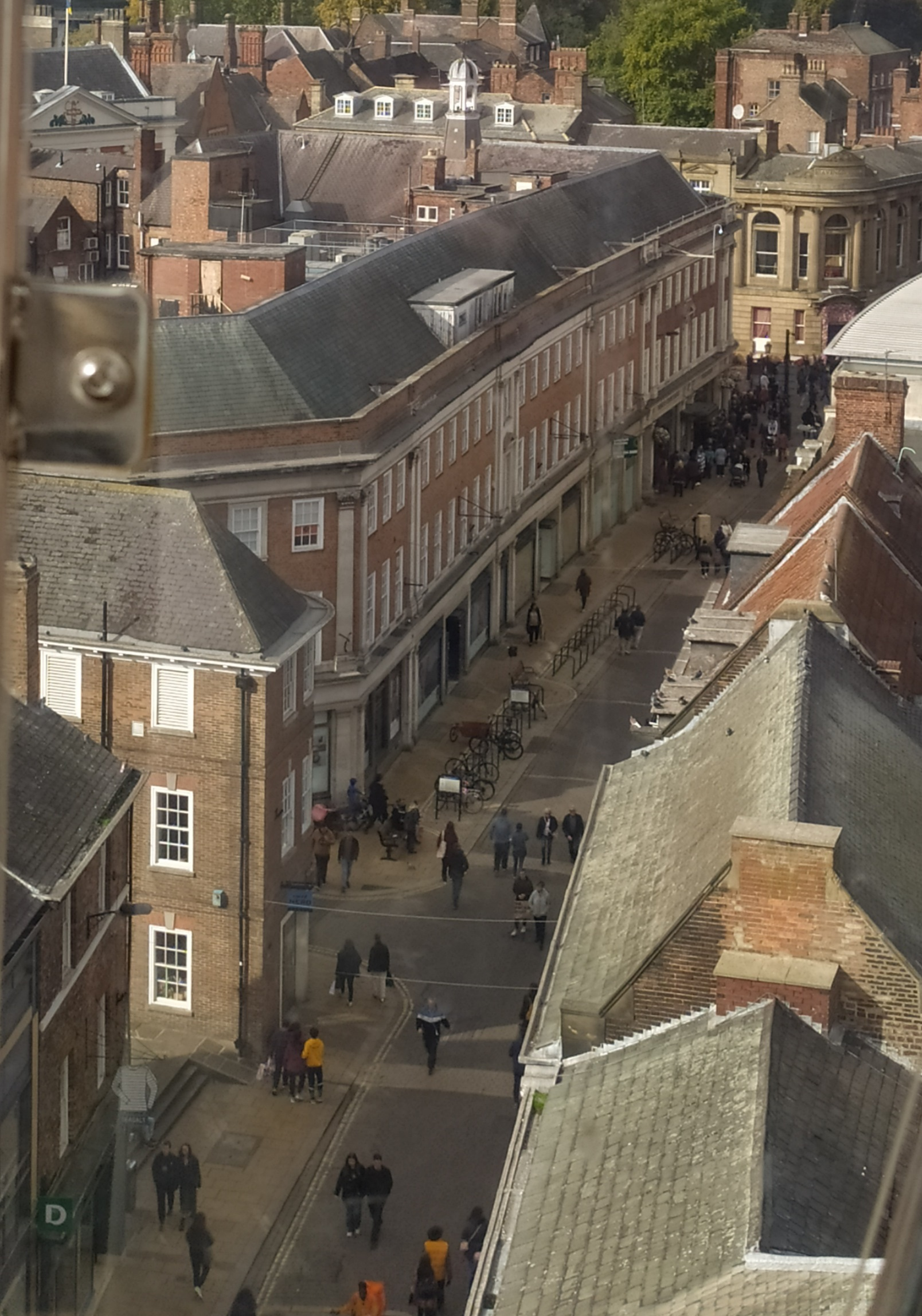
Aerial view of Davygate, from St Sampson' Square

The street runs south-east from St Helen's Square to St Sampson's Square. Before 1745, it started slightly further north-west, at a junction with Coney Street and Stonegate. On the south-west side, it has a junction with New Street.

The south-west side of the street mostly consists of neo-Georgian buildings, the latest dating from the 1950s. Until 2019, part of the range was occupied by a branch of Debenhams. 20 Davygate is a listed building, its earliest sections dating from the 18th-century, but repeatedly rebuilt. On the north-east side, 15 Davygate has a half-timbered facade, originally designed for Liberty's. It was rebuilt as the Tudor Cafe in 1927, with a notable art nouveau interior, but this was destroyed in the 1950s, when it was converted into a bank. Part of the street has been occupied since 1900 by Brown's department store. 3–5 Davygate is described by the City of York Council as "one of the best contemporary designs" in the city centre.
