= Augustinian Friary, York =

Former friary in North Yorkshire, England

Coordinates: 53°57′37.1″N 1°05′08.2″W

The Augustinian Friary was a friary in North Yorkshire, England. It stood in the city centre of York, between the River Ouse and the street now known as Lendal.history.ac.uk/rchme/york/vol5/pp148-157 |access-

The friars were granted a writ of protection by Henry III in July 1272 and Richard III, when he was Duke of Gloucester, stayed at the friary during his visits to York. The friary was surrendered on 28 November 1538.
