= Browns of York =

Department store group in England

W. P. Brown Limited, trading as Browns of York, is a British department store chain with stores in York, Helmsley, Beverley and Gainsborough. Browns have been trading since 1890 when the first store opened in York, and has been family run since its founding.

The York store is the largest and oldest of the four and is located in Davygate, while the Helmsley store is located in Market Place and opened in 1992. A third store in Beverley opened on 25 March 2010 and a fourth store opened in Gainsborough in Lincolnshire on 15 August 2012.

== In popular culture ==
Browns of Helmsley appeared as "Browns of Ashfordly" in a 2008 episode of the UK television series Heartbeat.
