= York Pride =

Annual LGBTQ festival in York, England

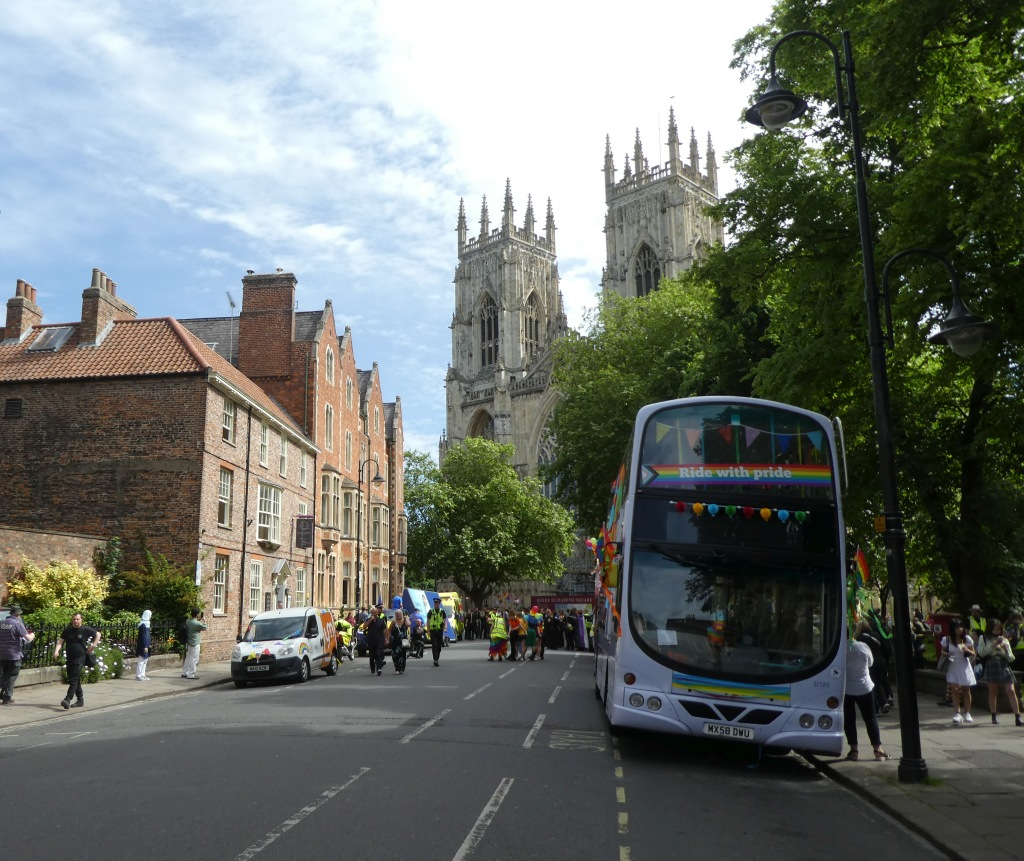
- York Pride 2022
- Frequency: Annual
- Locations: York, North Yorkshire, England
- Inaugurated: 21 July 2012
- Founder: Dan Sidley
- Managing director: Greg Stephenson
- Website: yorkpride.org.uk

York Pride is an annual LGBTQ pride event and registered charity in the city of York, North Yorkshire, England. Its typical parade route began outside York Minster until 2025 when this changed to Parliament Street, and it then moves through the city's streets to the Knavesmire, where events and performances are held. Its first event took place on 21 July 2012 under chair Dan Sidley, initially intended to celebrate progress in LGBTQ rights thus far and campaign for same-sex marriage in response to comments made against the change by Archbishop of York Dr John Sentamu. 500 people attended this first event. It has since become a wider celebration, bringing 17,500 attendees to York Pride 2025.

== History ==
=== 2012–2019: First events and same-sex marriage campaign ===
York Pride was set up in 2012 to celebrate the "progress made in terms of gay rights and to press for marriage equality and for fair treatment internationally for people regardless of their sexuality", according to organisers, with chair Dan Sidley stating that "times have changed here in York and across much of this country and it is telling that the gay people of the city can now celebrate openly and feel a valued part of York life." Organisers also said that its first event would be dedicated to supporting marriage equality; the idea for this theme came in response to the Archbishop of York Dr John Sentamu's comments against proposals for same-sex marriage.

The first Pride march in York thus took place on 21 July 2012; about 500 people took part in the parade and followed the York Samba Band, a double-decker bus, and a 100-metre (110 yd) rainbow flag on the two-mile route from York Minster at midday, moving along Duncombe Place, Blake Street, Davygate, Parliament Street, High Ousegate, Low Ousegate and Skeldergate, and ending up at the main venue of Bustardthorpe Field. Here, booked entertainment included performances by Craig Colton and Scooch as well as speeches by leader of York City Council James Alexander and York MP Hugh Bayley as well as Conservative and Liberal Democrat groups on the city council.

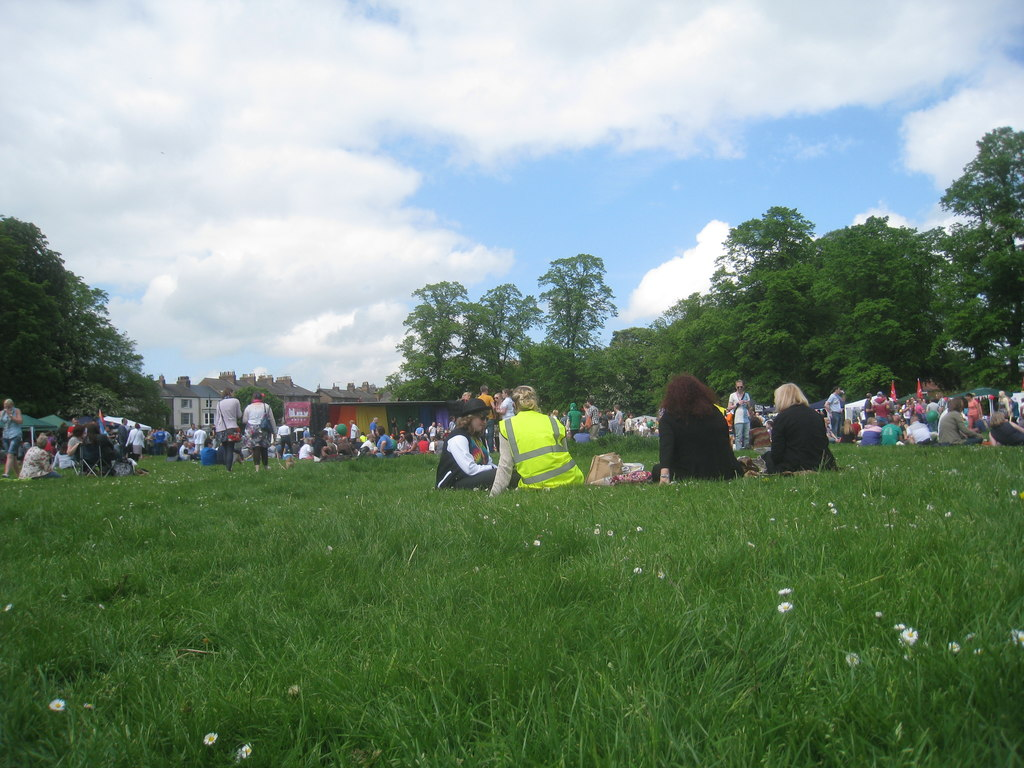
York Pride 2013 on Micklegate Stray

York Pride 2015's parade featured a 50-metre (55 yd) rainbow flag which was unfurled on the steps of the York Minster. At York Pride 2016 outside York Minister, a minute's silence was held for the victims of the Pulse nightclub shooting that year. 49 balloons were released, one for each person killed. Actor Christopher Biggins led the parade.

York Pride 2017 was held shortly following the entrance of the Conservative Party into a government coalition with the Democratic Unionist Party which opposed same-sex marriage. This led to a protest against the York Conservatives at the event. Just prior to York Pride 2018, members of the Conservative Party stated that they would be boycotting that year's event in response to the protests against them the previous year, as it would "not be safe". Responding to this, organisers of York Pride welcomed the party to return while also emphasising the right to free speech. Labour Party councillor Stuart Barnes said the protest had been peaceful. The event's parade started at York Minster at 1:00 pm. Performers who were due to appear included Cleopatra, the Cheeky Girls, and drag performers.

For York Pride 2019, the parade which started from York Minster at 12:00 pm was led by hundreds of pupils from 25 schools and colleges from the York area, including Selby, Tadcaster, Malton and Ryedale.

=== 2020–present: Increasing attendance ===
The parade at York Pride 2023 began outside York Minster at 11:30 am on 3 June, then went along Bishopthorpe Road to the Knavesmire. There, performers included Claire Richards, Kimberly Wyatt, Kitty Scott-Claus and Beth McCarthy. 120 stall holders attended. For the 2024 event, organisers added more accessible tracking, created a food and drinks court area, adjusted performance times, and added a "Quiet Hour" for accessibility during which the music was turned off. The event had 150 stall holders.

A record of over 17,500 people took part in York Pride in 2025, making it the largest LGBTQ celebration in York and North Yorkshire as well as the region's largest free one-day event. The parade set off at 1:30 pm with a different start to previous years at Parliament Street, within a set of counter-terrorism bollards. Led by an open-top bus, It followed sections of Davygate, St Helen's Square, Coney Street, Spurriergate, Bridge Street, Skeldergate, Bishopgate Street, Bishopthorpe Road, Campleshon Road and Knavesmire Road, ending on the Knavesmire. The parade took around 35 minutes to pass by. Both the Lord Mayor of York, Martin Rowley, and Mayor of York and North Yorkshire, David Skaith, took part. Labour MP for York Outer Luke Charters said that at the 2025 event a group of protesters who were chanting "Labour, Labour, genocide" threw a can of baked beans at him. Performers included La Voix, the Cheeky Girls, Kerry Ellis, drag trio Angels of the North, and a tribute act to the Pet Shop Boys. In July, following a High Court ruling that the participation of uniformed Northumbria Police officers in Newcastle Pride 2024 was unlawful, and subsequent announcement from the North Yorkshire Police chief constable that they would abide by this ruling, chair of York Pride Greg Stephenson responded that, "the chief constable's framing of Pride as a 'cause' that police must be seen to remain impartial toward risks mischaracterising what Pride is. Pride is, and always has been, both a celebration and a protest – a space where LGBT+ people assert their rights, visibility and dignity."

The Mayor of York and North Yorkshire and the Combined Authority, David Skaith, backed York Pride for its 2026 event on 30 May, acting as the event's main partner and sponsor. The authority invested £22,000 into the event through its Vibrant and Sustainable High Street Fund. Entertainment following the march was to be held at the Knavesmire as usual. After sending letters to people around the Knavesmire area that included details of road closures and potential disruption caused by the upcoming 2026 event, York Pride organisers received a discriminatory letter that they described as "distressing", which included statements that LGBTQ people were "not normal" and that "we used to arrest people like you." Stephenson stated that this was the first time a letter had been returned to them in this way, and said the event would go ahead as planned as it was "the perfect example" of why people "still need[ed] Pride."
