= Coppergate =

Street in York, England

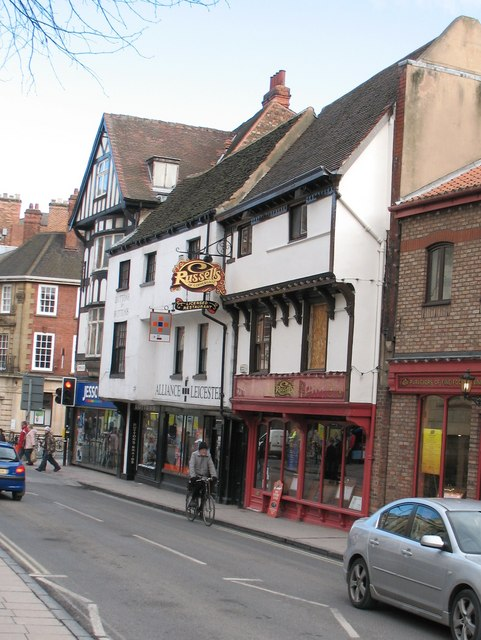
- Looking north-east on Coppergate
- Location within York
- Former names: Marketshire; Ousegate
- Location: York, England
- Coordinates: 53.9579°N 1.0808°W
- North east end: Pavement; Piccadilly; Parliament Street; High Ousegate
- South west end: Castlegate; Nessgate; King Street; Clifford Street

Coppergate is a street in the city centre of York, in England. The street runs north-east from the junction of Castlegate, Nessgate, King Street and Clifford Street, to end at the junction of Pavement, Piccadilly, Parliament Street, and High Ousegate.

== History ==
The site of the street lays outside Roman York's walls and was a glass-making district. It was abandoned after the Roman period and re-occupied during the 9th-century, Viking York. During the 11th-century, housing existed on the street, found through archaeological finding.

Some time between 1120 and 1135, it was first recorded as a centre for coopers, from which its name derives. Over time, the Pavement Market spread onto the street. The south-western end of the street was widened in 1900, leading to the replacement of most Mediaeval buildings.

In 1976, major Viking remains were found immediately south of the street, while a cinema and the Cravens confectionery factory were demolished. Coppergate Shopping Centre opened in 1984, over the demolished buildings.

== Architecture ==
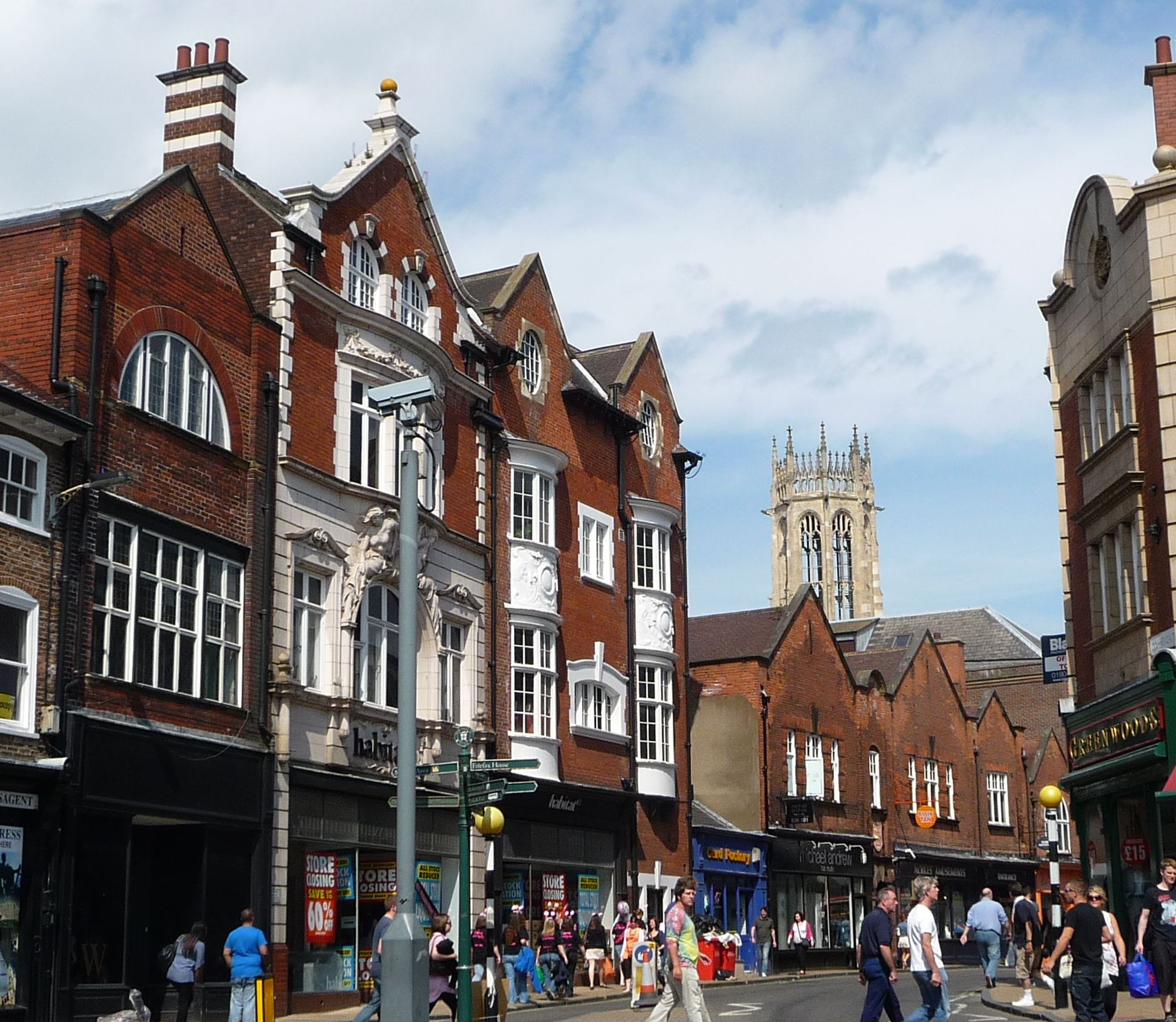
View from the south-western end of the street

The back of the church of All Saints, Pavement, lies on the north side of the street, followed by a row of shops with their main entrances on High Ousegate. Numbers 3–7 was built in two stages in the 1900s, and in the late-20th century was occupied by Habitat. On the south side, Galtres Chambers and the 16th-century Three Tuns pub are both listed buildings, as are two structures with 15th-century origins: 26 Coppergate, and 28–32 Coppergate.
