= Coney Street =

Street in York, England

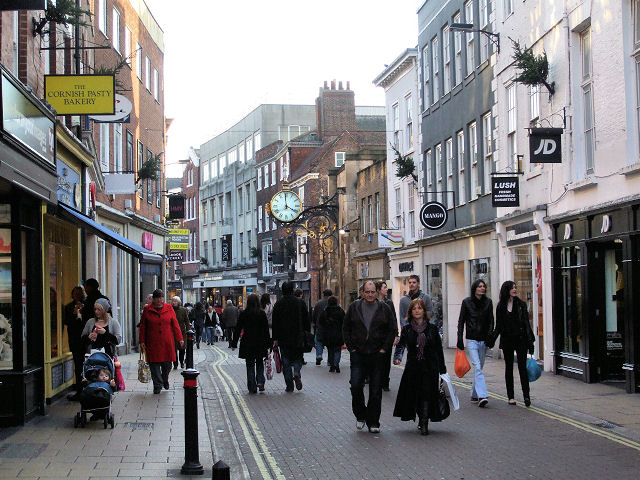
- View south on Coney Street, from St Helen's Square
- Location within York
- Location: York, England
- Postal code: YO
- Coordinates: 53.9592°N 1.0841°W
- North west end: St Helen's Square
- Major junctions: New Street
- South east end: Spurriergate; Market Street

Coney Street is a major shopping street in the city centre of York, England. The street runs north-west from the junction of Spurriergate and Market Street, to St Helen's Square. New Street leads off the north-east side of the street, as does a snickelway leading to the Judges Court hotel, while several snickelways lead from the south-west side down to the River Ouse, including Blanshard's Lane, and paths leading to City Screen.

== History ==
The street was first established in the Roman Eboracum period, running parallel to and outside the city's south-western wall. At that time, the city's bridge over the River Ouse lay at its northern end. Excavations have located remains of a 1st-century grain warehouse on the south-west side of the street. By 980, the first Ouse Bridge had been constructed further south, but the street remained important, with traffic reaching the bridge from the north along it.

The street was first recorded in about 1150 as "Cuningstrete", the King's Street. The use of "street" rather than "gate" suggests that the name dates from the Anglian period, and two coin hoards from the period were found in the 1760s. By 1150, the road was considered to run from Ousegate to what is now St Helen's Square, the section now known as Spurriergate sometimes distinguished as "Little Coney Street", while Lendal was regarded as a northern extension, named Old Coney Street. St Martin le Grand, on the street, was recorded in the Domesday Book, and unlike most streets in York, Coney Street was divided between parishes: St Martin Le Grand, St Michael, Spurriergate, and St Helen, Stonegate.

In the 12th century, Coney Street was known for its Jewish population, with residents including Aaron of York, considered the wealthiest Jew in England. It also housed York's synagogue. In 1190, the Jews of York were massacred and many of their houses were burned down. In 1279, after the Jews had been expelled from England, Roger Basy and John Sampson were granted their former property on Coney Street.

In 1308, Coney Street was described as the most important street in York. In 1335, a row of houses was built in the churchyard of St Martin; almost entirely rebuilt on several occasions, its last remains survived until 1958. In 1396, the Gild of St Christopher Maison Dieu almshouse was constructed on the street, and in 1459 York Guildhall was built next to it, at the northern end of the street. Mansion House was built in front of the Guildhall in 1725, and in 1782 the area in front of it was cleared to create St Helen's Square.

Four of the locations at which the historic York Mystery Plays were performed lay the street.

The Bull Inn was built in the 15th century and, from 1459, was the only place in the city at which foreigners could stay. The George Inn opened on the street in 1614, becoming the city's most prominent coaching inn. Soon afterwards, the Black Swan was built on the opposite side of the street, a large inn capable of stabling 130 horses. In 1691, the Bagnio bathhouse was built just off the street; it was later converted into St Peter's School, and then into a printing house where the first edition of Tristram Shandy was published.

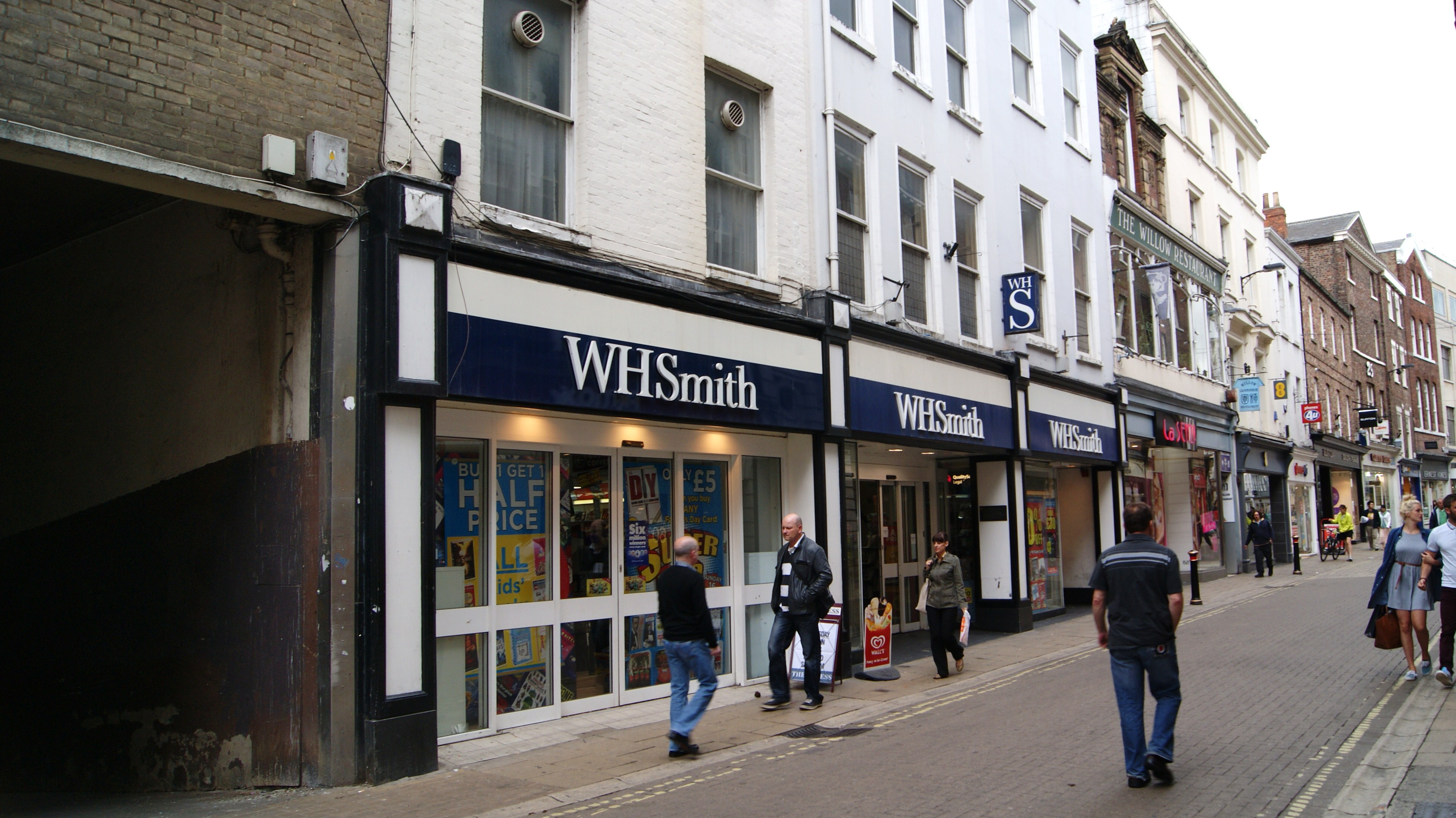
View north on Coney Street

During the 18th century, the street became known for banking. It also became the home of the York Courant newspaper, and later of the Yorkshire Evening Post and Yorkshire Herald. Its continuing importance led to the street being widened in 1769 and again in 1841.

In the 19th century, the street became lined with shops, noted businesses including the House of Bewlay tobacconist, Burgin's perfumery, and the Leak & Thorp department store. Clothing shops were particularly prominent, including Iles, R. W. Anderson & Sons, and later Burton's. There were also major grocers' stores, such as Borders' and Lipton's. In 1924, the Leopard Inn was demolished and replaced by the Leopard Arcade, a small shopping centre, but it was destroyed by bombing in 1942.

The Ebor Hall entertainment venue was built just off the street in the 1860s, and there were also several pubs. In 1915, the Picture House cinema opened, and in 2000 the City Screen cinema followed. The Willow Café was another long-running entertainment venue, opening in the 1950s and surviving until the 2010s, by which time it operated as a nightclub.

During the 20th century, an increasing number of shops were taken over by national chains. Boots opened in 1919, WHSmith's in 1920, and Woolworths in 1924. The Black Swan was eventually demolished and replaced by a large shop, which later became BHS. Despite the closure of several shops in the 2010s, the street remains home to a mix of high-street shops and cafés, and numerous buskers perform throughout the day. The musician Chris Helme was discovered while busking on the street.

== Architecture ==
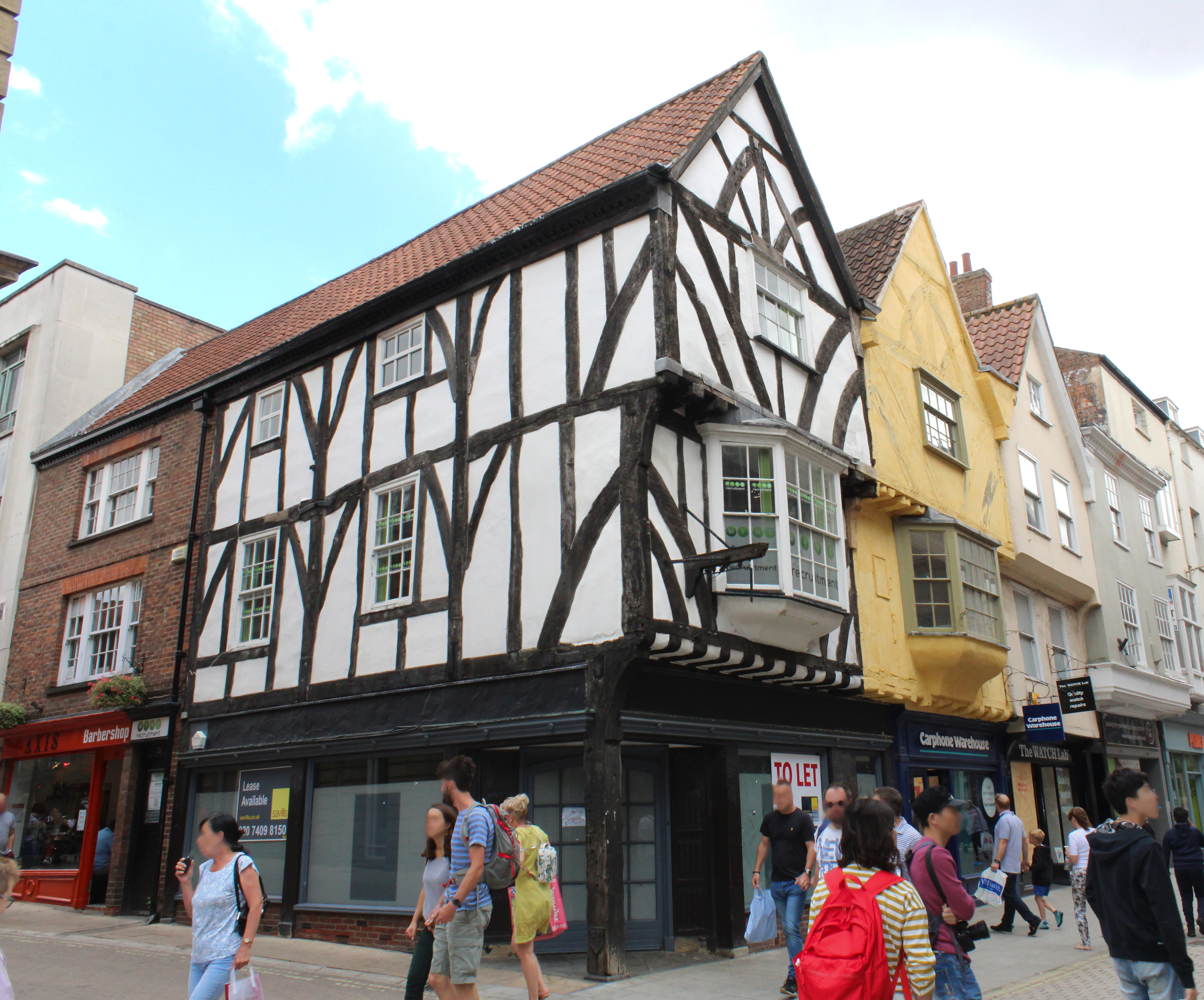
18–22 Coney Street

While the street retains numerous historic buildings, most have had their street-level frontage rebuilt during the 20th century. Notable buildings on the north-east side include Nos. 2–2A, a shop built around 1880; No. 14 from 1907, co-listed with 10 New Street; the Grade II*-listed Nos. 16–22, built around 1500; No. 24, which was built about 1600 but includes part of an earlier building; the early-18th-century Judges Court hotel; No. 32, originally a house built around 1600; No. 34, built about 1880; Nos. 36–42, dating from the 1780s; No. 46, the former Yorkshire Bank branch built in 1922–23; No. 48, built for Boots in 1907 in a mock-timber-framed style; while the former Burton's Tailors at No. 52 is in the Art Deco style from 1931.

On the south-west side stand the Grade I-listed Mansion House at No. 1; the early-18th-century Nos. 3–7; the mid-18th-century No. 9 and No. 13, the latter incorporating part of a medieval wall by the Ouse; Nos. 15–17, which include the former York Courant office at No. 15, built around 1800, and No. 17, which retains one surviving column from the George Inn; the 19th-century No. 23 and No. 25; the early 18th-century No. 33; Nos. 35–37, built in the mid-19th century; No. 39, from the early 18th century; and No. 41 and No. 50, both from the mid-19th century.
