= 19 Market Street =

Listed former pub in York, England

- The building in 2025
- Interactive map of the 19 Market Street area
- Former names: The Tiger; William Bass

General information
- Status: Converted to commercial use with residential above
- Type: Public house, later building society
- Location: Market Street, York, England
- Coordinates: 53.9587°N 1.0820°W
- Year built: Mid-19th century
- Renovated: 1988 (refurbished); 1992 (altered)
- Closed: 1991; 35 years ago (as a pub)

Design and construction
- Designations

Listed Building – Grade II
- Official name: 19, Market Street
- Designated: 24 June 1983
- Reference no.: 1257369

19 Market Street is a Grade II listed former public house on Market Street in York, England. Established as a mid‑19th‑century pub, it was trading as The Tiger by 1983 and remained in use as licensed premises until the early 1990s, when it briefly traded as the William Bass. The building was altered in 1992 and had become a building society by the time its listing was amended in 1997. It is now in commercial use as a hair and beauty salon, with self‑contained residential accommodation on the upper floors.

== History ==
The building stands on Market Street and began as a mid‑19th‑century public house. Local accounts suggest that it was operating as The Tiger by 1851. The 1885 directory for York records John Scales at the Tiger Inn.

In 1968 the site was included within the newly established Central Historic Core conservation area. It was still trading as The Tiger when it was designated a Grade II listed building on 24 June 1983. It stands next to No. 21 and next door but one to the Burns Hotel pub at No. 23, both also Grade II listed.

Anecdotal accounts state that the building was refurbished in 1988 and reopened as the William Bass, and photographs published by The Press show it still operating in 1989 and closing in 1991. The building was altered in 1992, and by the time the listing was amended in 1997 it had become a building society. It is now in commercial use as a hair and beauty salon, with the upper floors forming self‑contained residential accommodation.

== Architecture ==
The building is of mottled grey‑brown brick, with the ground floor finished in glazed tiles. It has a timber eaves cornice and a slate roof with a chimney at the right-hand end. The front has three storeys and three windows. The former inn frontage is marked by plain pilasters supporting a full-width cornice topped with decorative urns. The central door, set back slightly, has margin glazing and an overlight, and the two ground‑floor windows on either side match this glazing; the left is a single pane, the right is divided into two, and both have shaped sills. At the left end is a later 20th‑century door with a bordered panel and a margin‑glazed overlight. The upper floors have eight‑pane sash windows with shallow arched brick heads; those on the first floor sit above a painted sill band, while those on the second floor have painted stone sills.

== See also ==
- Listed buildings in York (within the city walls, northern part)
