= Judges Court =

Listed building in York, England

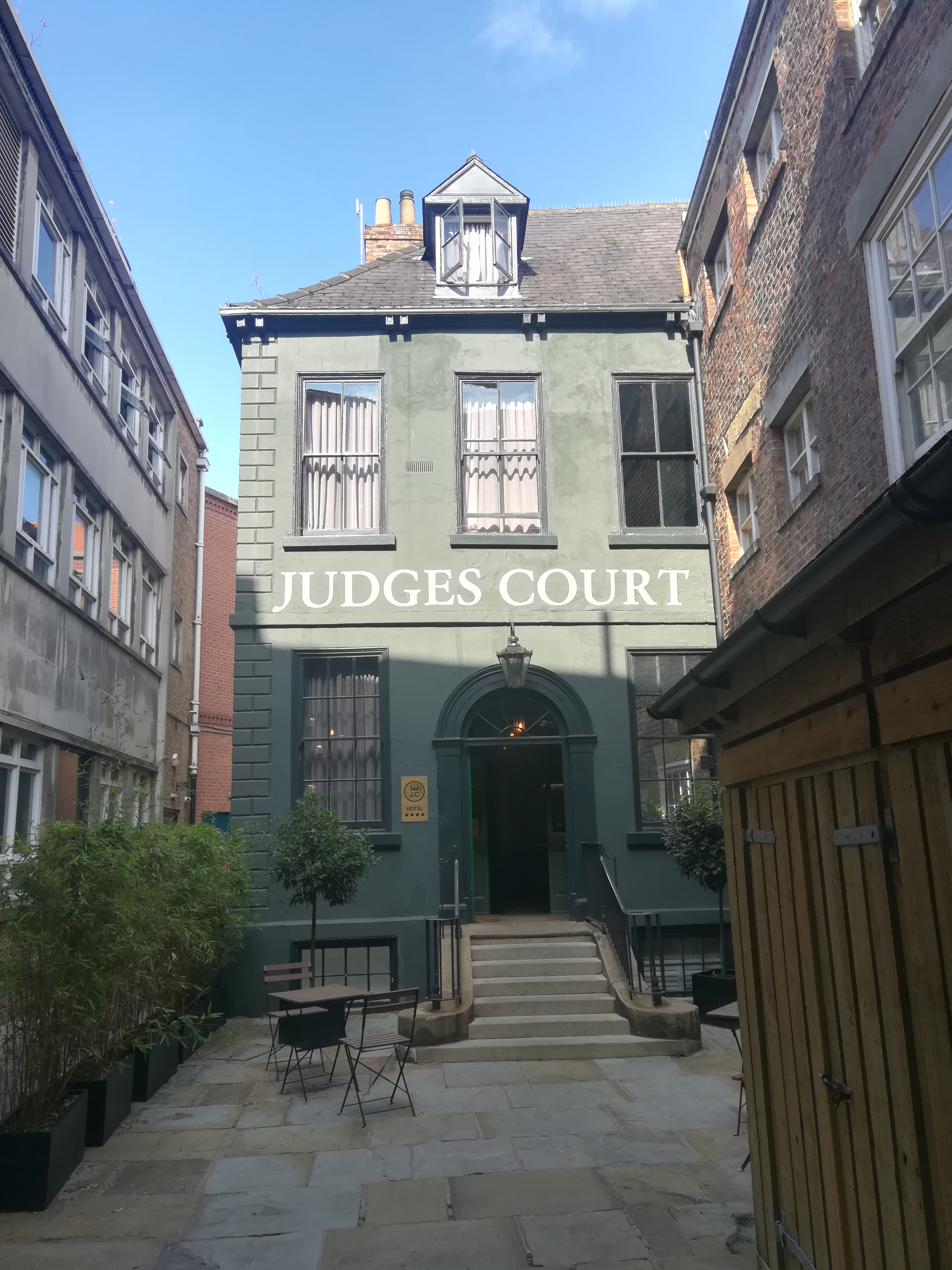
- The building in 2018
- Interactive map of the Judges Court area

General information
- Status: Converted to hotel
- Location: York, England
- Coordinates: 53°57′33″N 1°05′01″W
- Completed: Early 18th century
- Renovated: Late 18th and 19th centuries (altered); 2010s (converted)

Technical details
- Floor count: 2 + cellar + attic

Design and construction
- Designations

Listed Building – Grade II*
- Official name: Judges Court and attached front steps and railings
- Designated: 19 August 1971
- Reference no.: 1257937

Website
- judgescourt.co.uk

Judges Court is a historic building in the city centre of York, England.

The building lies in a courtyard, off Coney Street. It was built at the start of the 18th century, while some of the walls in the south corner may survive from an earlier structure. From 1720, it served as lodgings for judges presiding over assize courts in the city. In 1806, the judges were relocated to Judges' Lodgings, and the house was let short-term to families visiting the city. In 1841, it became the ministers' house for the Wesleyan chapel on New Street, and it later served as offices. It was Grade II* listed in 1971, along with its front steps and railings.

In the 2010s, the building was converted into a 15-bedroom hotel, with each room named after a judge who stayed in the building. It originally shared owners with the city's Churchill hotel. In 2023, it was put up for sale, for £3 million.

The building is constructed of brick, with the front and sides covered in Victorian render, with stone dressings, timber gutters, and a slate roof. The central entrance is up stone steps, with cast iron railings, and there is a 19th-century front door with a fanlight above. The front abuts the rear of 28 and 30 Coney Street, and although that building is 20th-century, there has been a structure in that location since Judges Court was built. The windows are sashes, and mostly 19th-century. At the rear, there is a spiral staircase, which leads down to the basement.

Inside the building, there are brick-vaulted cellars. The south corner room on the ground floor has early panelling, and the first floor room above has an early fireplace, as does one attic room. The main staircase, and the surviving part of the back staircase above the first floor are also early. Many of the remaining fixtures are 19th-century.

== See also ==
- Grade II* listed buildings in the City of York
- Listed buildings in York (within the city walls, northern part)
