= The Three Tuns =

Listed pub in York, England

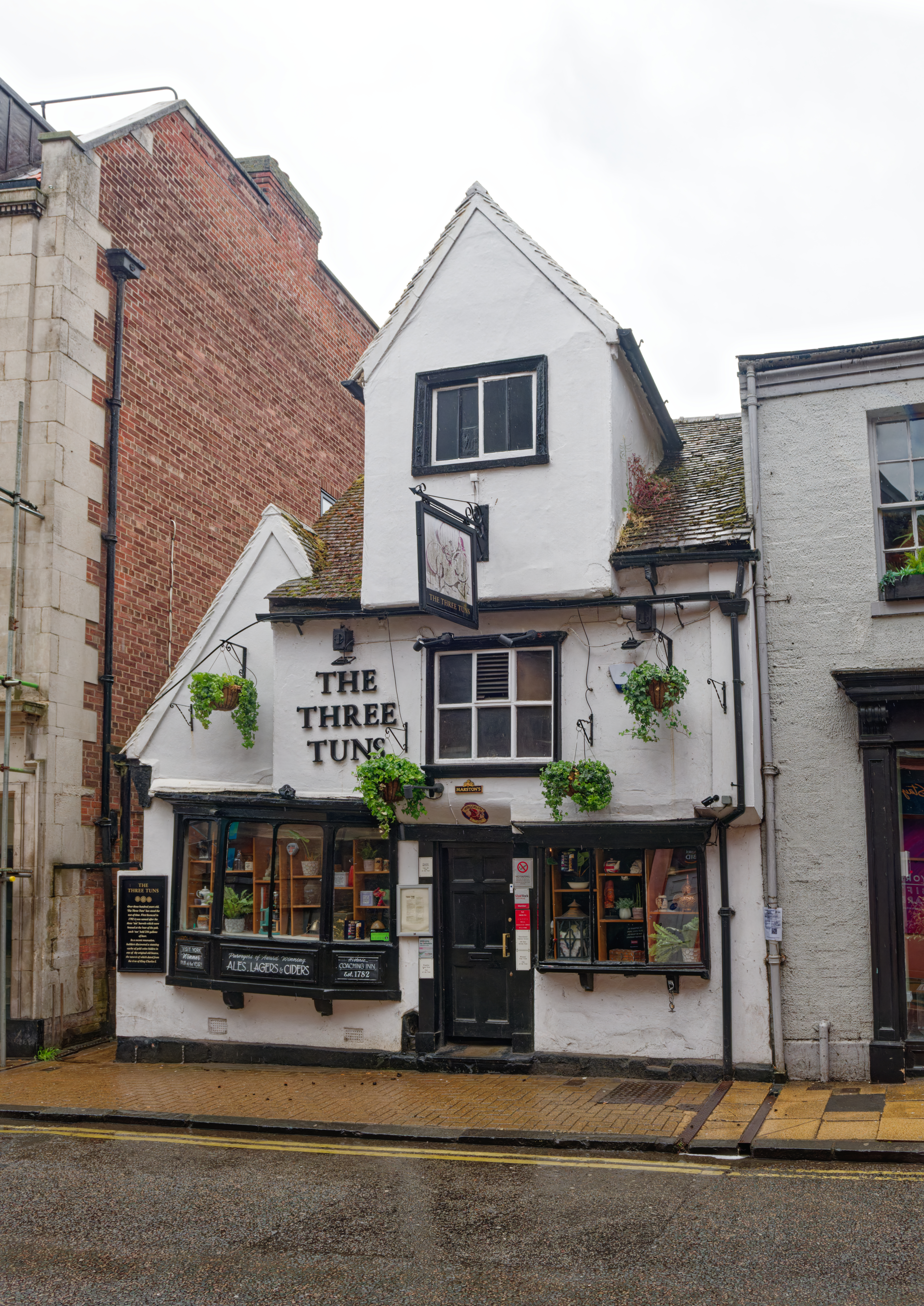
- The pub in 2024

General information
- Type: Public house
- Location: 12 Coppergate, York, England
- Coordinates: 53.95776°N 1.08093°W
- Year built: 16th century (probable)
- Renovated: 19th century (altered and extended)
- Owner: Marston's

Listed Building – Grade II
- Official name: The Three Tuns
- Designated: 14 June 1954
- Reference no.: 1257942

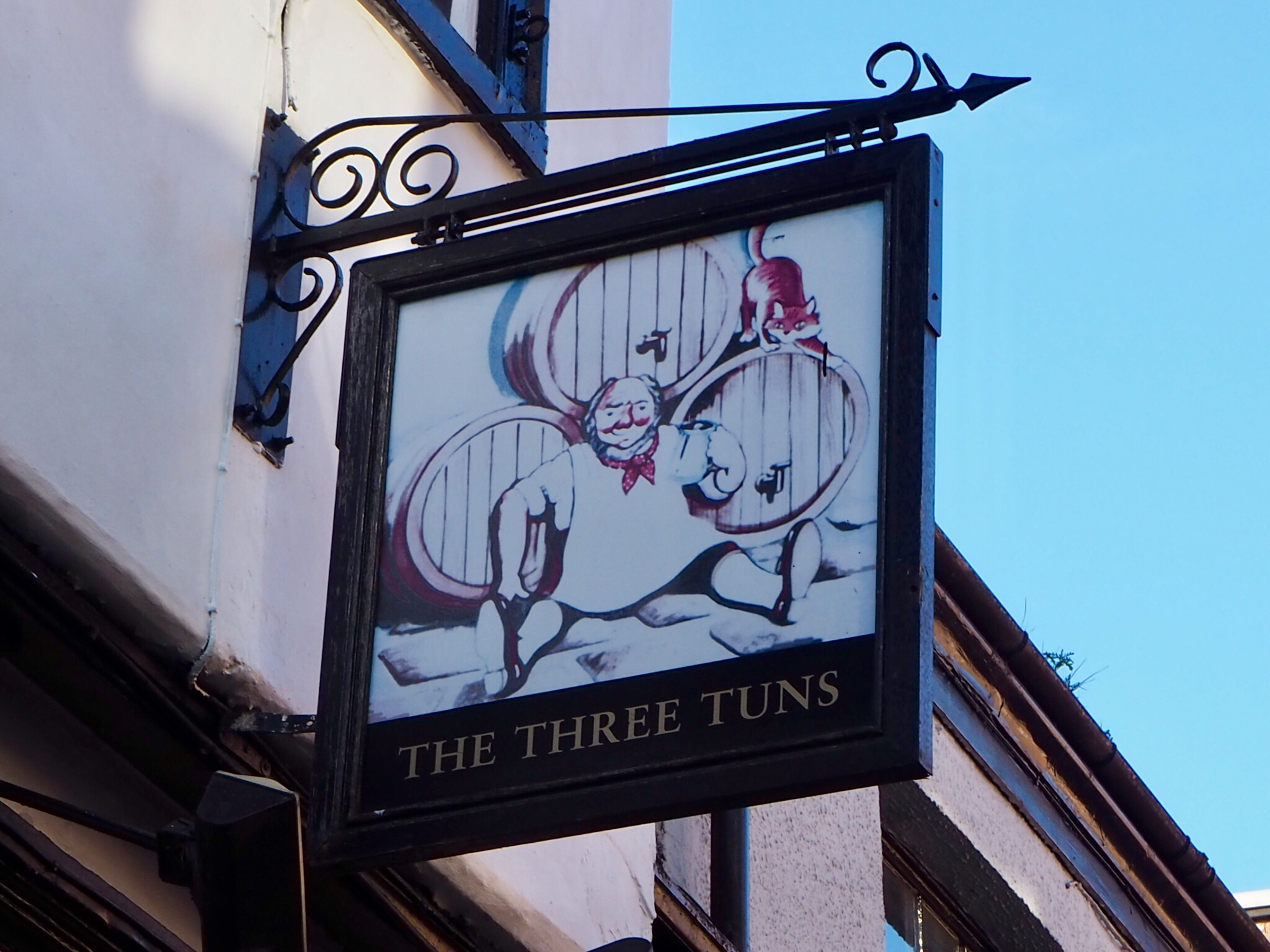
The sign above the entrance

The Three Tuns is a public house on Coppergate, in the city centre of York, England.

The building was probably constructed in the 16th century and is timber-framed, with the first floor jettied. It was heavily altered in the 19th century, since when it has been a two-storey building with an attic, and the windows date from this period. At the north-east end, there is a lean-to bay, and there is a large 20th-century extension to the rear. The rear extension includes an 8-foot (2.4 m) stone wall, which may be medieval.

The building is recorded as having been a pub from at least 1782. It was owned by Maltby & Wilberforce from 1861 and specialised in selling wines and spirits. It later became owned by the Courage Brewery and was sold to the Mansfield Brewery in 1991. In 1970, a cache of silver coins was discovered, and a cache of gold coins was also found during renovations to the customer service area. The building was Grade II listed in 1954. As of June 2025, the freehold is owned by Marston's.

== See also ==
- Listed buildings in York (within the city walls, southern part)
