= Pavement (York) =

Street in York, England

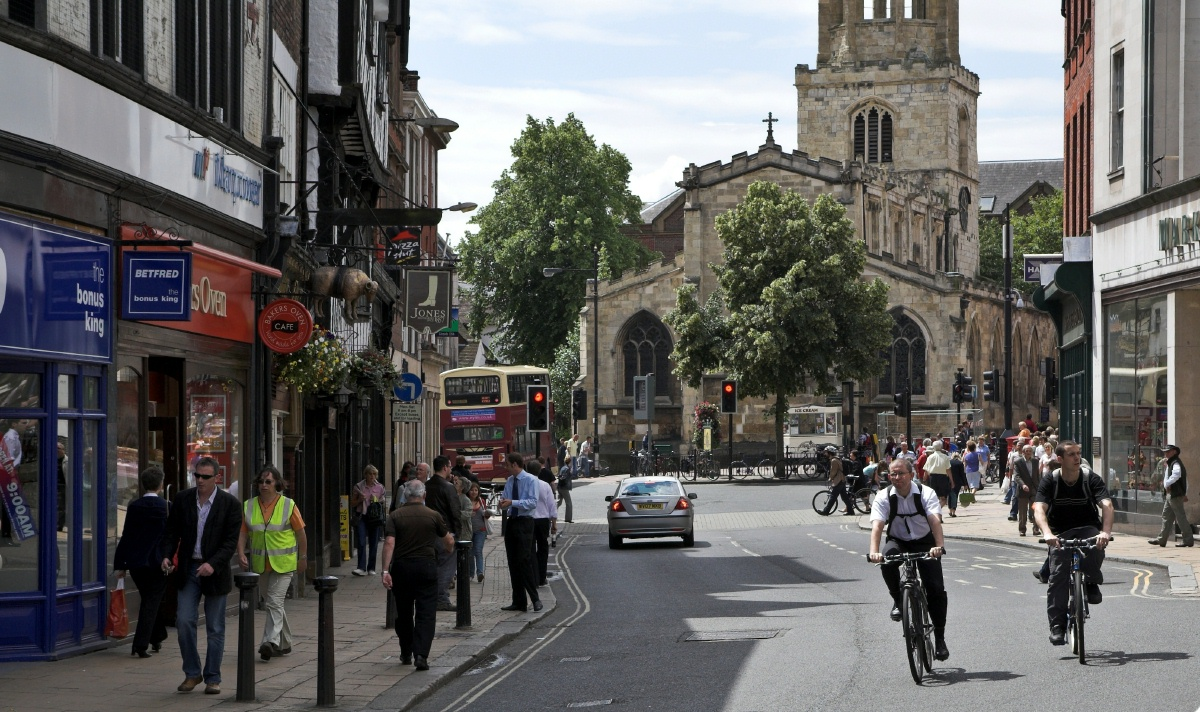
- View west along Pavement
- Location within York
- Former names: Marketshire; Ousegate
- Location: York, England
- Postal code: YO
- Coordinates: 53°57′30.96″N 1°4′46.78″W
- West end: Coppergate; High Ousegate; Parliament Street; Piccadilly
- Major junctions: The Shambles
- East end: Stonebow; Fossgate; Whip-Ma-Whop-Ma-Gate

Pavement is a street in the city centre of York, England.

== History ==
The area occupied by Pavement lay outside the Roman city walls but was fairly central within the medieval walls of York. During the Anglo-Saxon and Viking eras it formed part of the commercial area of Jorvik. The location of one of York's two early markets, the road was known as Marketshire, a name first recorded in 1086, and shared with the city ward in which it stood. It was also known as Ousegate, a name that remains in use for its western continuation. By the Middle Ages its market days were Tuesday, Thursday and Saturday, and the central part of the street was roughly its present width, far wider than most city streets of the time.

From 1329 the street was increasingly known as "Pavement", likely indicating that it was one of the first roads in the city to be paved. As a major open space it was a popular site for public gatherings; it contained a ring for bull baiting and was also the location where Thomas Percy, 7th Earl of Northumberland was executed.

The market continued to thrive, and a market cross was erected in 1671. By the 18th century the market was short of space, and sections of the road were widened: shops in front of St Crux Church were demolished in 1769, followed by the chancel and part of the churchyard of All Saints' Church, in 1782. The market cross was demolished in 1813. In 1836 Parliament Street was laid out, leading to the demolition of many buildings on the north side of the street; St Crux was demolished in 1887. In 1912 Piccadilly was extended to reach Pavement on the south side, resulting in further demolitions. Finally, in the 1950s Stonebow was constructed as an eastern continuation of the street.

== Layout and architecture ==
At the western end of the street, Parliament Street runs to the north and Piccadilly to the south, while to the west it divides into High Ousegate and Coppergate. Between those last two streets stands the church of All Saints. Several historic buildings lie on the southern side of Pavement. No. 6, built in the early 18th century; the mid-19th-century No. 8; No. 10, from around 1870; the early-17th-century Sir Thomas Herbert's House at Nos. 12–14 is the sole survivor of the large merchants' houses which once lined the street; the Golden Fleece pub at No. 16, rebuilt about 1840; Nos. 18–22, built in 1893 and formerly the Pavement Vaults pub; No. 24, a house and shop from around 1800; the 18th-century Nos. 26 and 28; and No. 30, built about 1796 and co-listed with Nos. 55–56 Fossgate.

At the eastern end of the street, Stonebow continues east, Fossgate runs south, and Whip-Ma-Whop-Ma-Gate runs north. The only historic building surviving on the north side is the parish room of St Crux Church, while the modern Marks and Spencer store dominates the remainder.

The Shambles lead north off Pavement, while the small Lady Peckett's Yard leads off its southern side.
