= 36–42 Coney Street =

Listed building in York, England

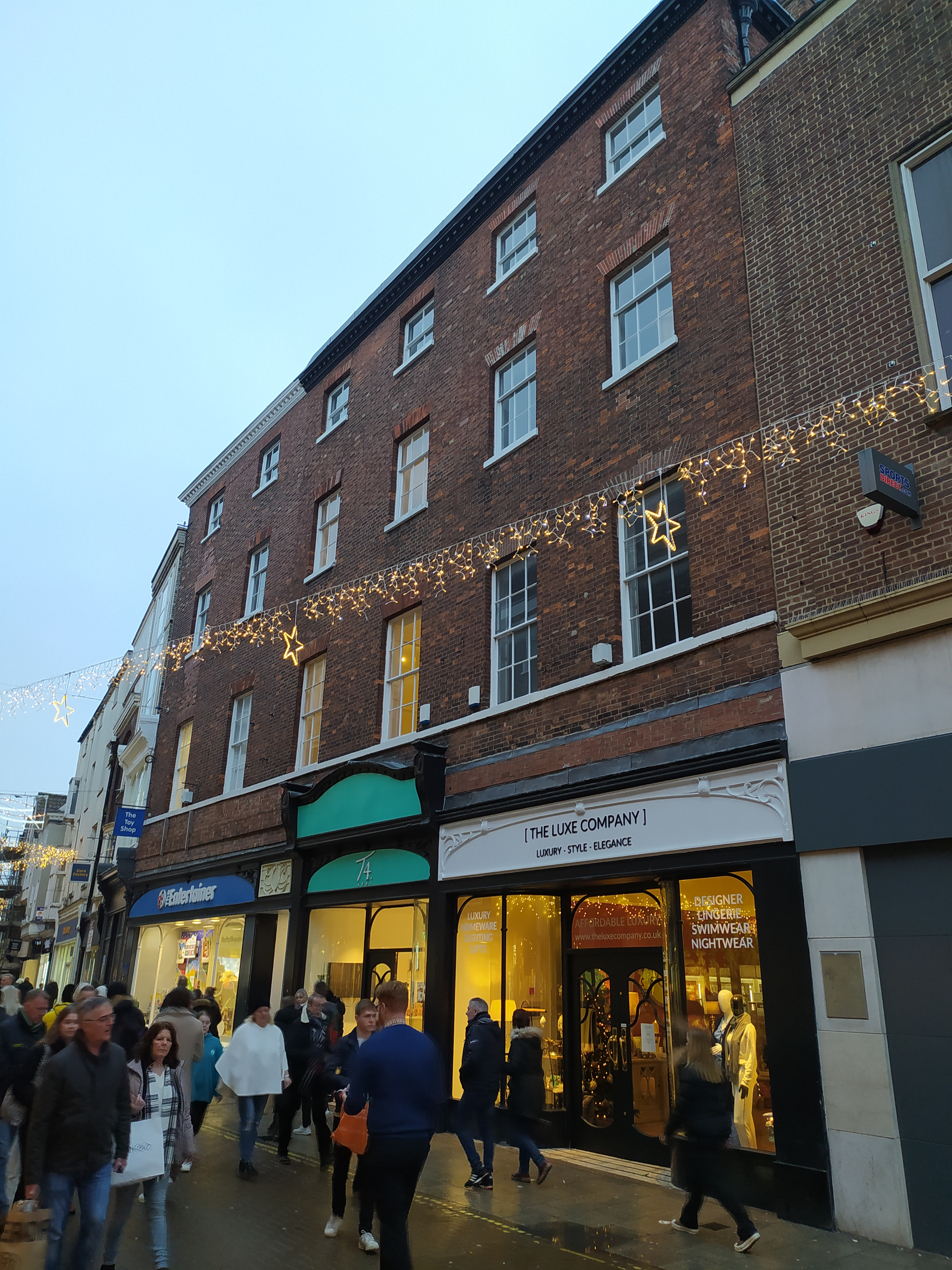
- The terrace in 2022
- Interactive map of the 36–42 Coney Street area

General information
- Location: Coney Street, York, England
- Coordinates: 53°57′32″N 1°05′01″W
- Year built: Late 18th century
- Renovated: Late 19th century (extended, shopfronts); 20th century (altered)

Technical details
- Floor count: 4

Design and construction
- Designations

Listed Building – Grade II*
- Official name: Numbers 36–42 (even) including number 38A
- Designated: 24 June 1983
- Reference no.: 1257947

36–42 Coney Street is a historic terrace in the city centre of York, England.

The oldest part of the terrace is the rear part of No. 36, which is a three-storey timber-framed structure built in the early 17th century, and later encased in brick. Two three-storey brick houses were constructed next to it, one in the mid-18th century, and one slightly later. In the 1780s, a terrace of three four-storey houses was built at the front of the site, facing onto Coney Street. Nos. 38 and 40 are of similar size, while No. 36 extends further back, lit in part by a light well. In the late 19th century, No. 36 was extended further back, and incorporated the buildings at the rear.

The ground floor of each of the former houses is now a shop, and the shop windows of the whole terrace are decorated in the same style, incorporating tulip motifs. A passageway between Nos. 36 and 38 leads to the rear yard. Inside, some early plasterwork survives on the upper floors, as do several fireplaces. The 17th-century block has an original staircase, and Nos. 38 and 40 have 18th-century staircases.

In the early 20th century, No. 36 was the local headquarters of the Women's Social and Political Union, a fact now commemorated by a plaque. The shop was occupied by Currys until 2017, and The Entertainer toy shop since 2018.

The building was Grade II* listed in 1983.

== See also ==
- Grade II* listed buildings in the City of York
- Listed buildings in York (within the city walls, northern part)
