= Ousegate =

Street in York, England

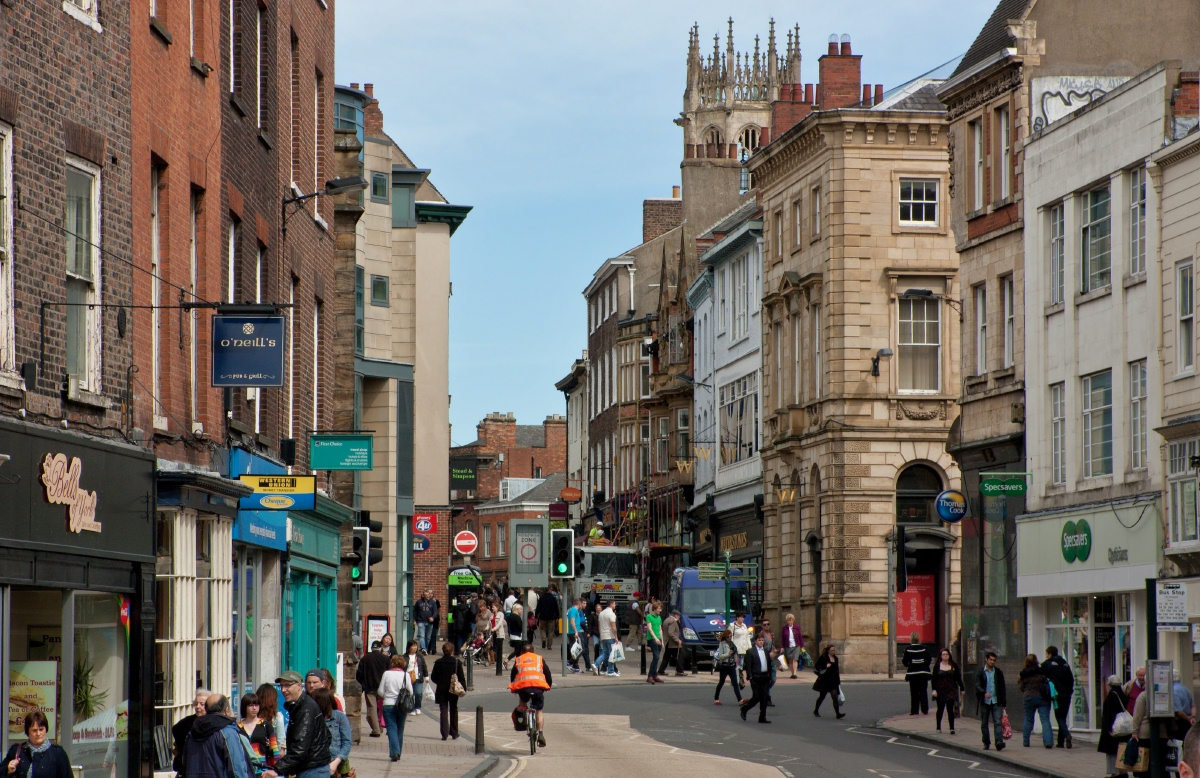
- The view up Ousegate, from Ouse Bridge
- Location within York
- Location: York, England
- Postal code: YO
- Coordinates: 53.9579°N 1.0821°W
- North east end: Coppergate; Parliament Street; Pavement; Piccadilly
- Major junctions: Spurriergate; Nessgate
- South west end: Ouse Bridge

Ousegate is a street in the city centre of York, England. It is divided into High Ousegate and Low Ousegate. The street forms part of the city's central shopping area. High Ousegate is pedestrianised, but Low Ousegate is a key transport route, busy with bus services.

== History ==
The area covered by the street lay outside the walls of Roman Eboracum, although archaeological evidence has been found of a bathhouse on the corner of Spurriergate and of temples to Hercules and the Emperor on the corner of Nessgate. Items associated with Viking Jorvik have also been found, but at that time the area appears to have been a large open space. With the construction of Ouse Bridge, however, Ousegate emerged as the route east from it. The street was first recorded in the 1120s, by which time the area appears to have become built up with houses, including at least one of stone, and with the churches of All Saints, Pavement and St Michael, Spurriergate. By the 14th century, the street was known for its lorimers (makers and sellers of metalwork for bridles and other horse furniture) and spurriers.

In 1694, a major fire destroyed thirty houses on the street, and as a result, other than the churches, there are no remaining pre-1700 building on Ousegate. Low Ousegate was very narrow until 1734, when its junction with Spurriergate was widened; in 1769, the south-east side of the street was rebuilt further back; and in the 1810s, when Ouse Bridge was reconstructed and the part of the street near the bridge was raised, all the houses on the north-west side were demolished and rebuilt, along with some on the south-east side.

In the medieval period, the market on Pavement often overflowed into High Ousegate, while from 1727 a herb market was held on the street. A corn exchange was built on the south side of the street in 1926, but closed in 1946. Low Ousegate was the original location of the Yorkshire Philosophical Society.

== Layout and architecture ==
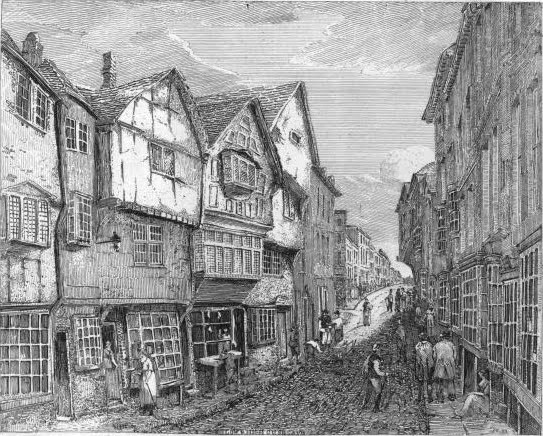
The view up Ousegate in 1813

=== Low Ousegate ===
Low Ousegate runs north-east from Ouse Bridge to its junction with Spurriergate and Nessgate. The snickelway Church Lane leads off its north-west side, while steps down to King's Staith lead off the south-east side. Nos. 4–8, Nos. 10–12, and No. 14 date from the rebuilding between 1810 and 1820, and their design may have been loosely based on drawings by Peter Atkinson. These are followed by St Michael's Church.

On the south-east side, Nos. 1–1A, Nos. 3–5, and No. 7 were also rebuilt in the same period, although the latter retains some 17th-century material, including panelling; Nos. 9–11 were originally two houses, with No. 11 having 17th-century origins; while No. 13 was built in the early 18th century.

=== High Ousegate ===
The line of the street continues as High Ousegate, which runs up to its junction with Coppergate, Parliament Street, Pavement and Piccadilly. Several snickelways lead off its north-west side, including Popes Head Alley, while a path on its south-east side leads to Coppergate.

Notable buildings on the north-west side include No. 5, built in 1743; Nos. 9–10, a shop dating from 1933; and Nos. 11–12, Nos. 13–14, and No. 15, all dating from the early-18th-century rebuilding.

On the south-east side, other than All Saints Church, notable buildings include No. 19, No. 20, and No. 21, all likely to be early 18th century; Nos. 22–25, a four-storey building dating from around 1840; and Nos. 26–27, co-listed with 3–7 Coppergate and dating from 1902.
