= Piccadilly (York) =

Street in York, England

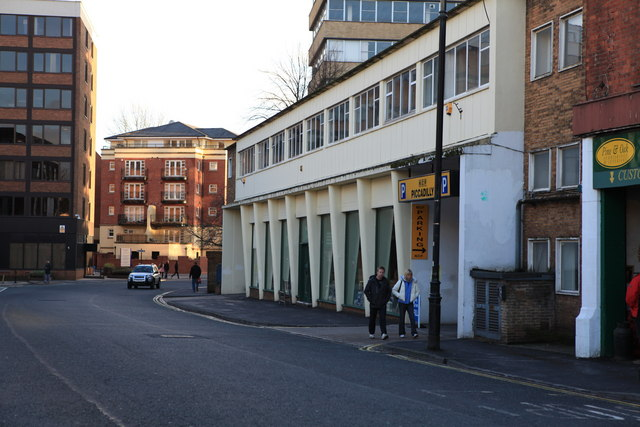
- South end of Piccadilly
- Location within York
- Location: York, England
- Coordinates: 53.9565°N 1.0774°W
- North end: Parliament Street; Pavement; High Ousegate; Coppergate
- South end: Fishergate

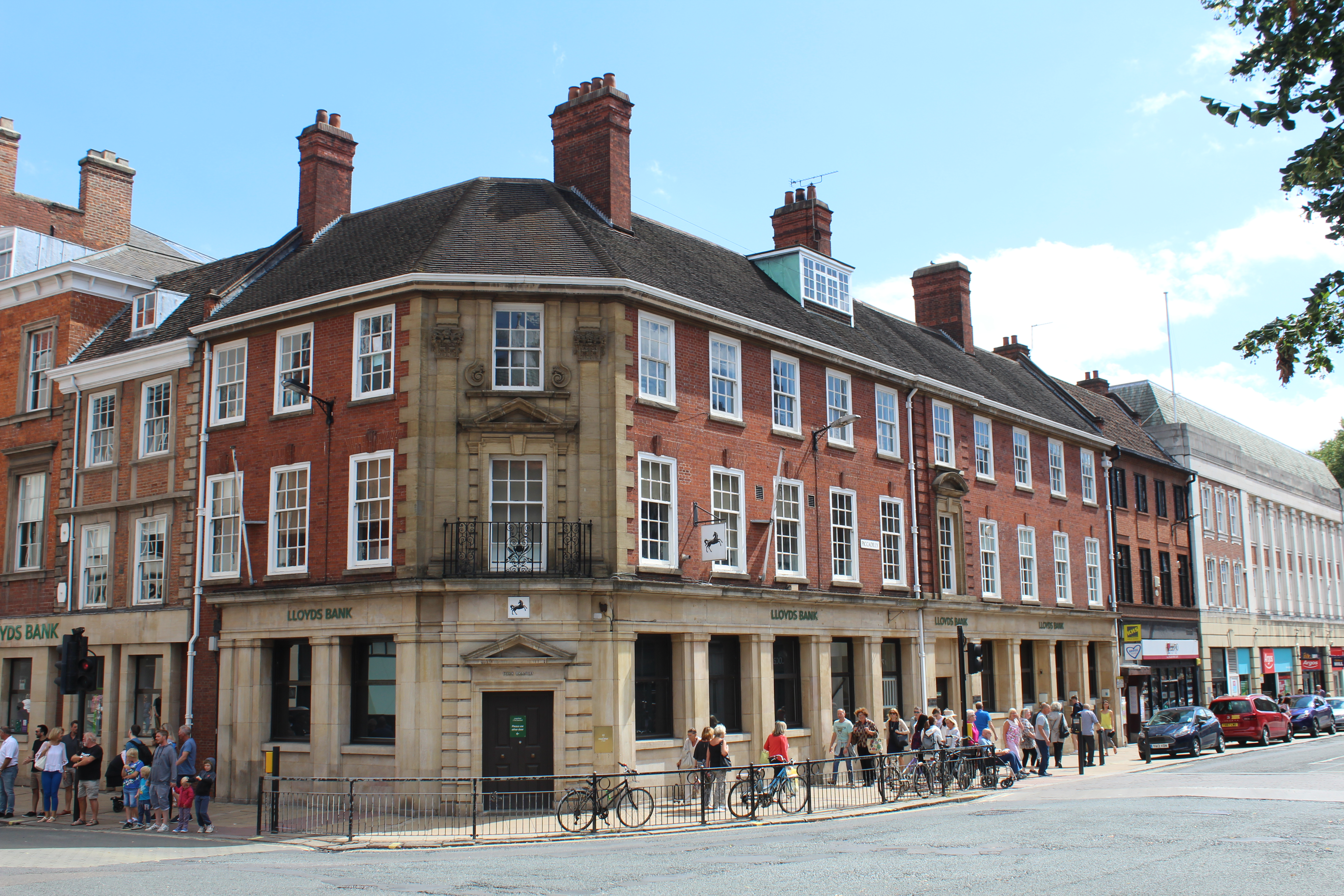
Piccadilly Chambers, at the northern end of the street

Piccadilly is a street in the city centre of York, in England.

== History ==
The River Foss was dammed in York, on the orders of William the Conqueror, to create a large fishpond, with a marsh extending to its east. Between the two, they covered much of the land over which Piccadilly now runs. The pool gradually decreased in area, and by 1610, a lane had become established, along the southern part of what is now Piccadilly. The river was canalised in 1792, allowing greater use of the area, and in about 1840, the street was widened, now reaching as far north as Dixon Lane. At this time, it was renamed, after Piccadilly in London, but due to its relative isolation from the rest of the city, it did not attract the hoped-for large residential properties. Instead, by the early 20th-century, the street was mostly industrial, with a sawmill and brewery alongside builders' and coal merchants.

In 1912, the street was again extended north. Piccadilly Bridge was constructed across the Foss, and some timber-framed buildings facing Pavement were demolished. The extension allowed York Corporation Tramways to construct a new depot on the street, and trams ran along its length. The street became increasingly known for shopping and entertainment, with the Regal Cinema opening in the 1930s, although it closed in 1959. Further out, there were car showroom and garages. In 1931, the tram depot became the Airspeed aeroplane factory.

By the 2010s, the City of York Council noted that "although it contains offices, apartments and hotels, Piccadilly is not a popular destination since it has little to offer in the way of retail or visitor attractions". As of 2020, several new hotels were under construction on the street.

== Layout and architecture ==
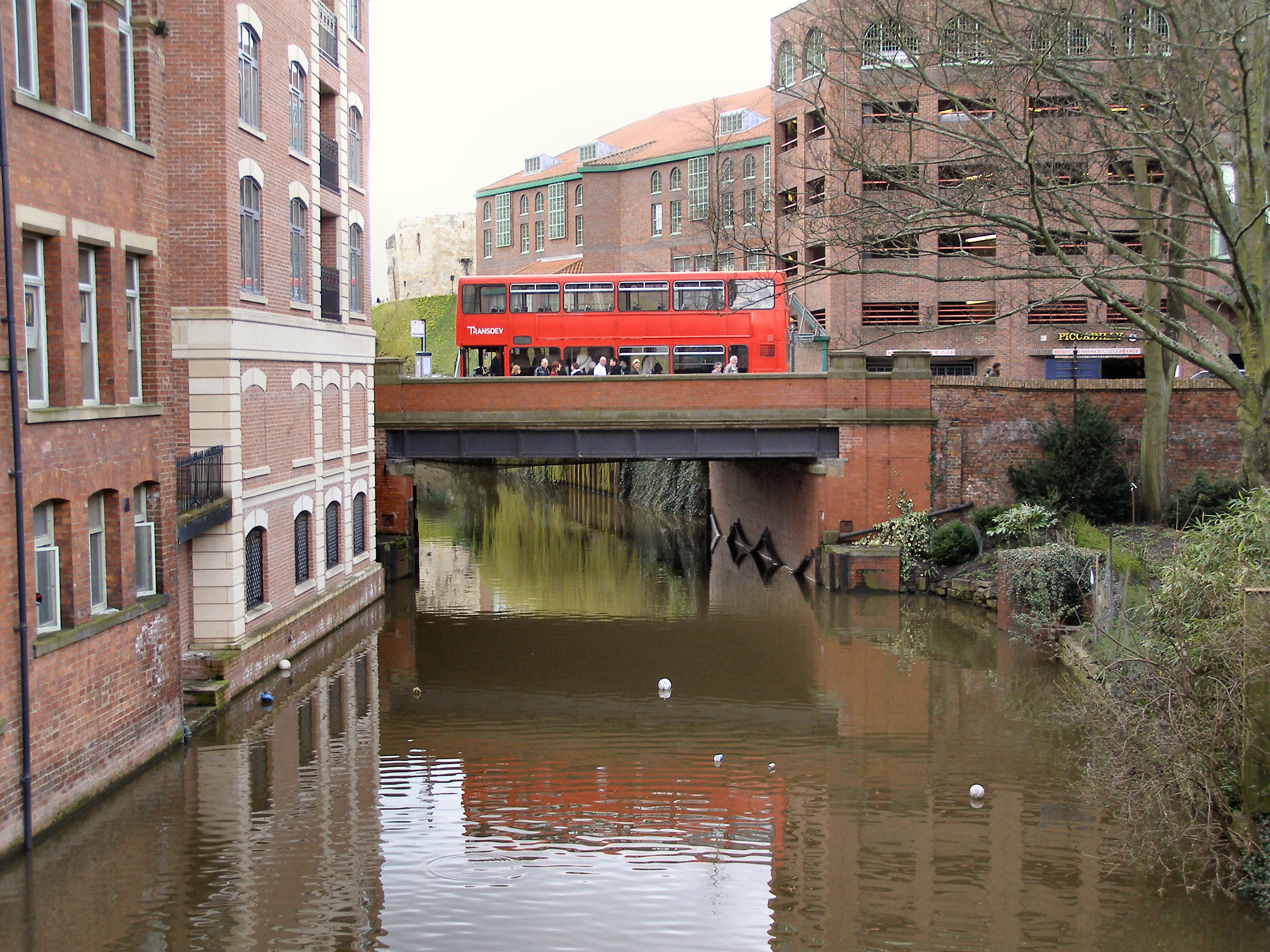
Piccadilly Bridge, seen from the east

The street now runs south, from the junction of Parliament Street, Pavement, High Ousegate and Coppergate, over the Foss, to end on the city's inner ring road, where it meets Fishergate. Several roads lead off to the east: Merchantgate, Dennis Street, St Denys Road, Mill Street, and Lead Mill Lane.

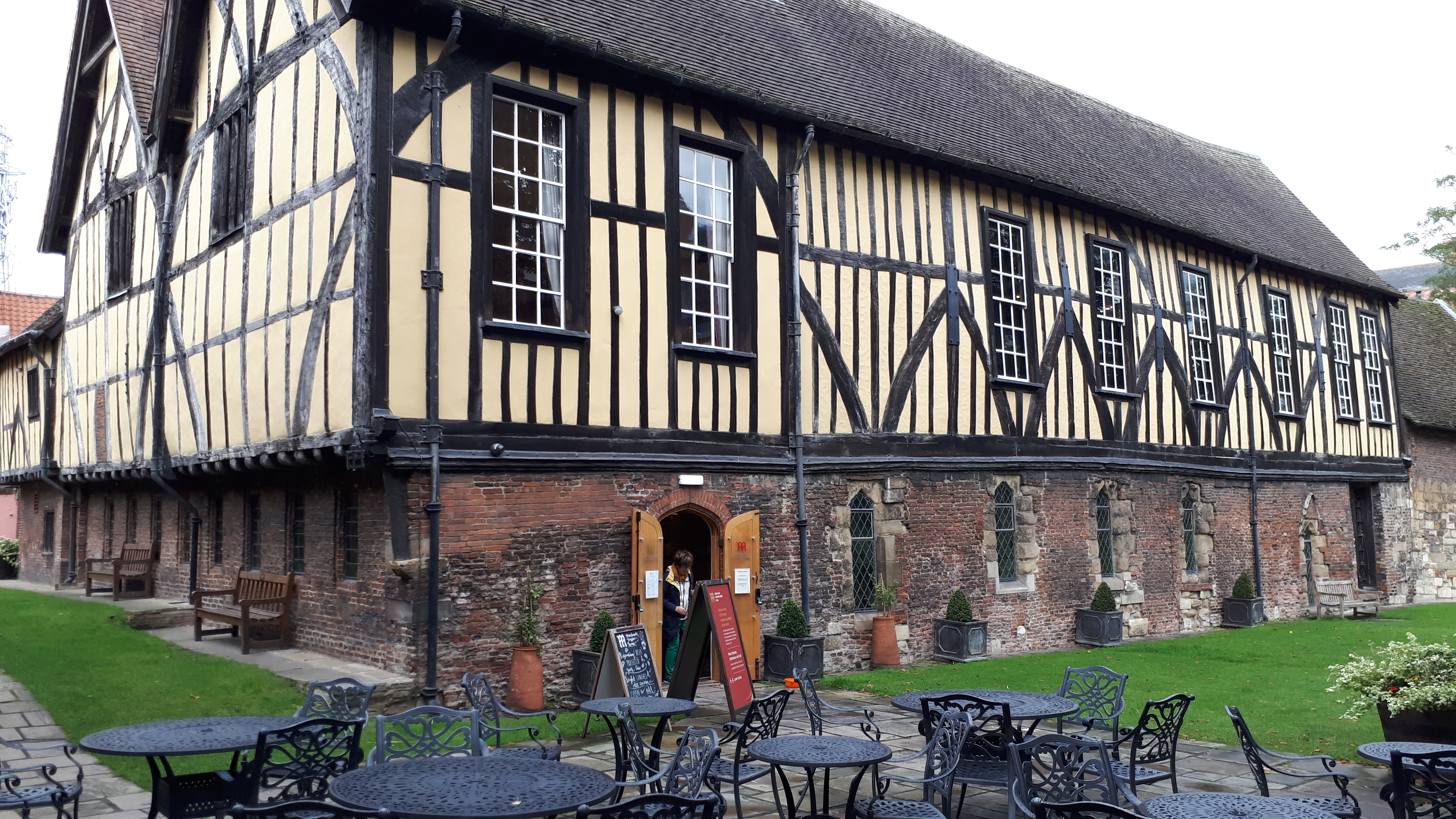
Merchant Adventurers' Hall

Listed buildings on the street include Piccadilly Chambers and the rear of the Merchant Adventurers' Hall. The former White Swan Hotel largely dates from 1912, but contains some 18th-century structure, including a staircase. The northern and central parts of the street is lined with shops, some of which form part of the Coppergate Shopping Centre. The Spark:York development of converted shipping containers is on the central part of the street, opposite the former Banana Warehouse. This, and the former tram depot, demolished in 2015, were described by the City of York Council as "the only buildings of merit" in the area.

The southern part of the street is dominated by office blocks, including Ryedale House, described by Nickolaus Pevsner as "deplorable", and Piccadilly House, described as "far superior". At the southern end of the street lies the Fishergate Postern Tower, part of the York City Walls.

== Gallery ==
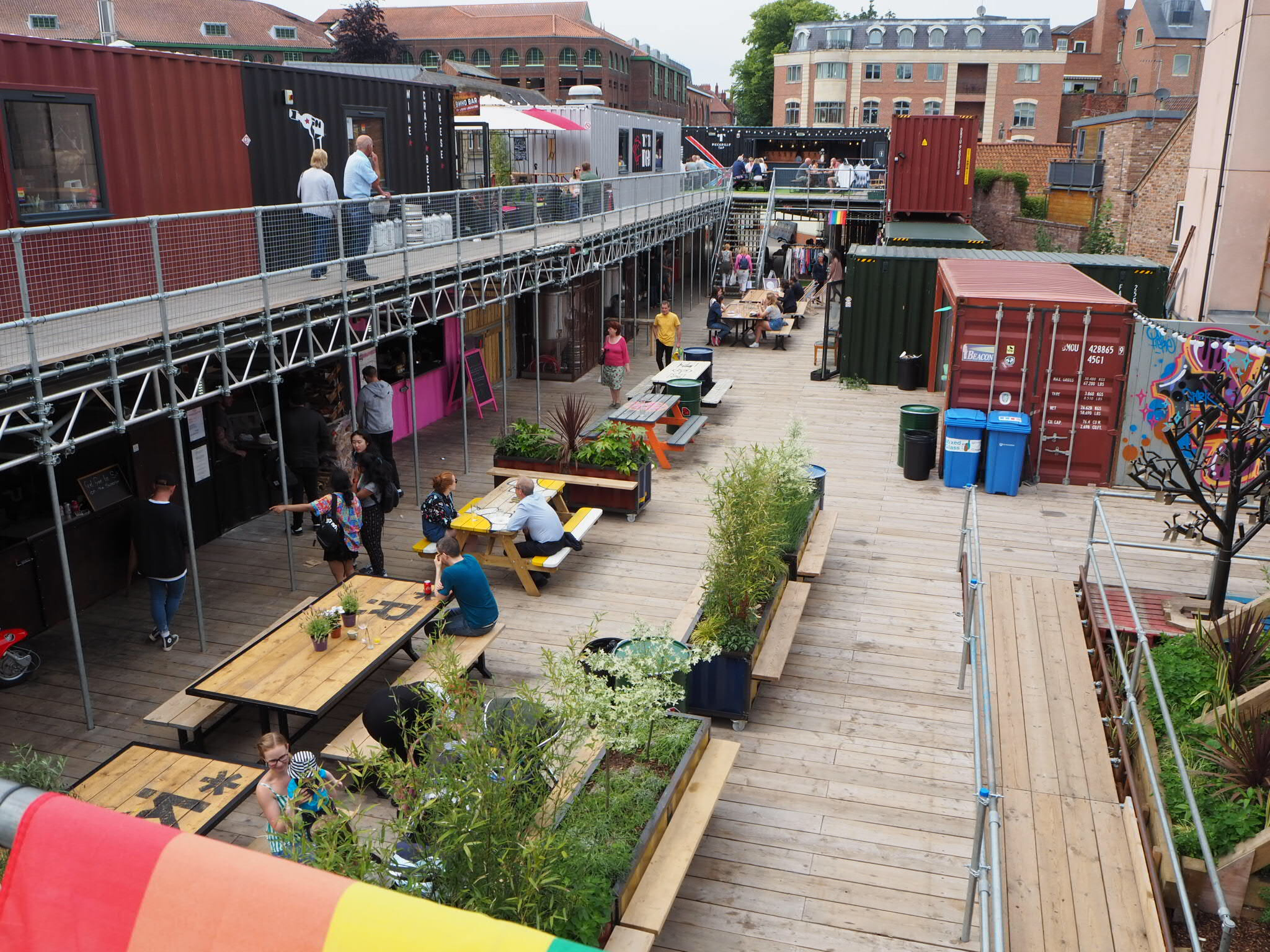
Spark:York

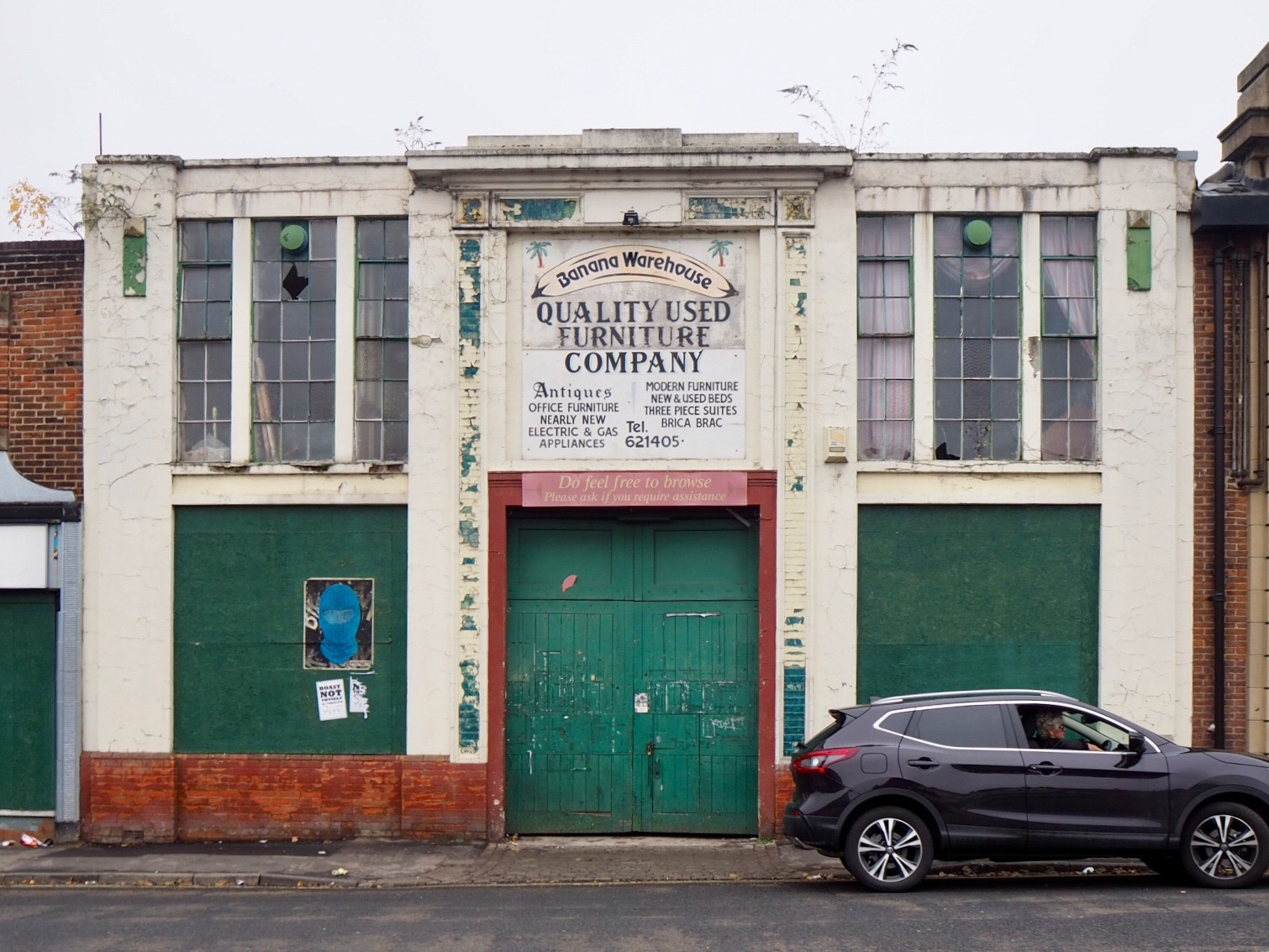
Banana Warehouse

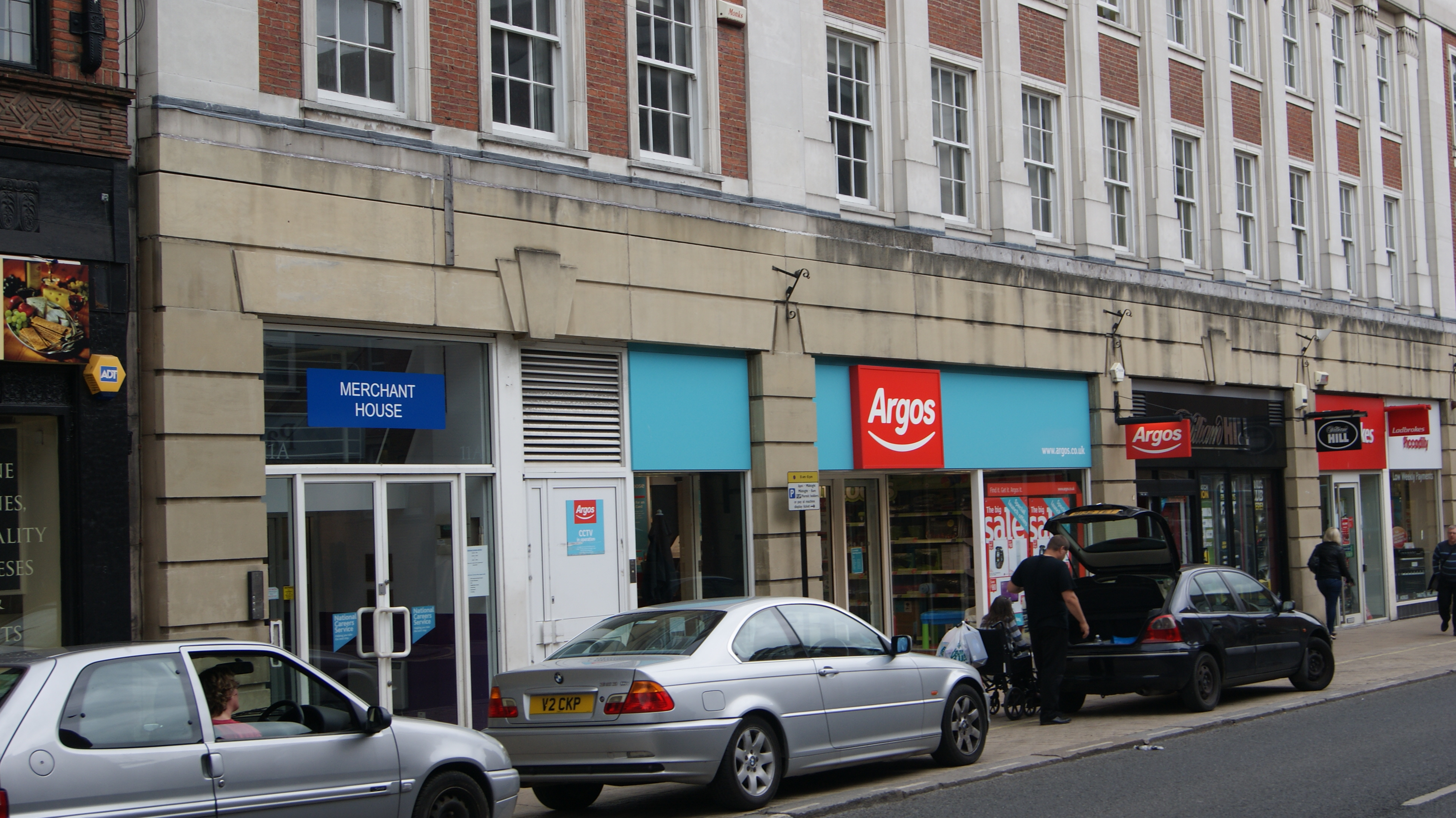
North Piccadilly Shops

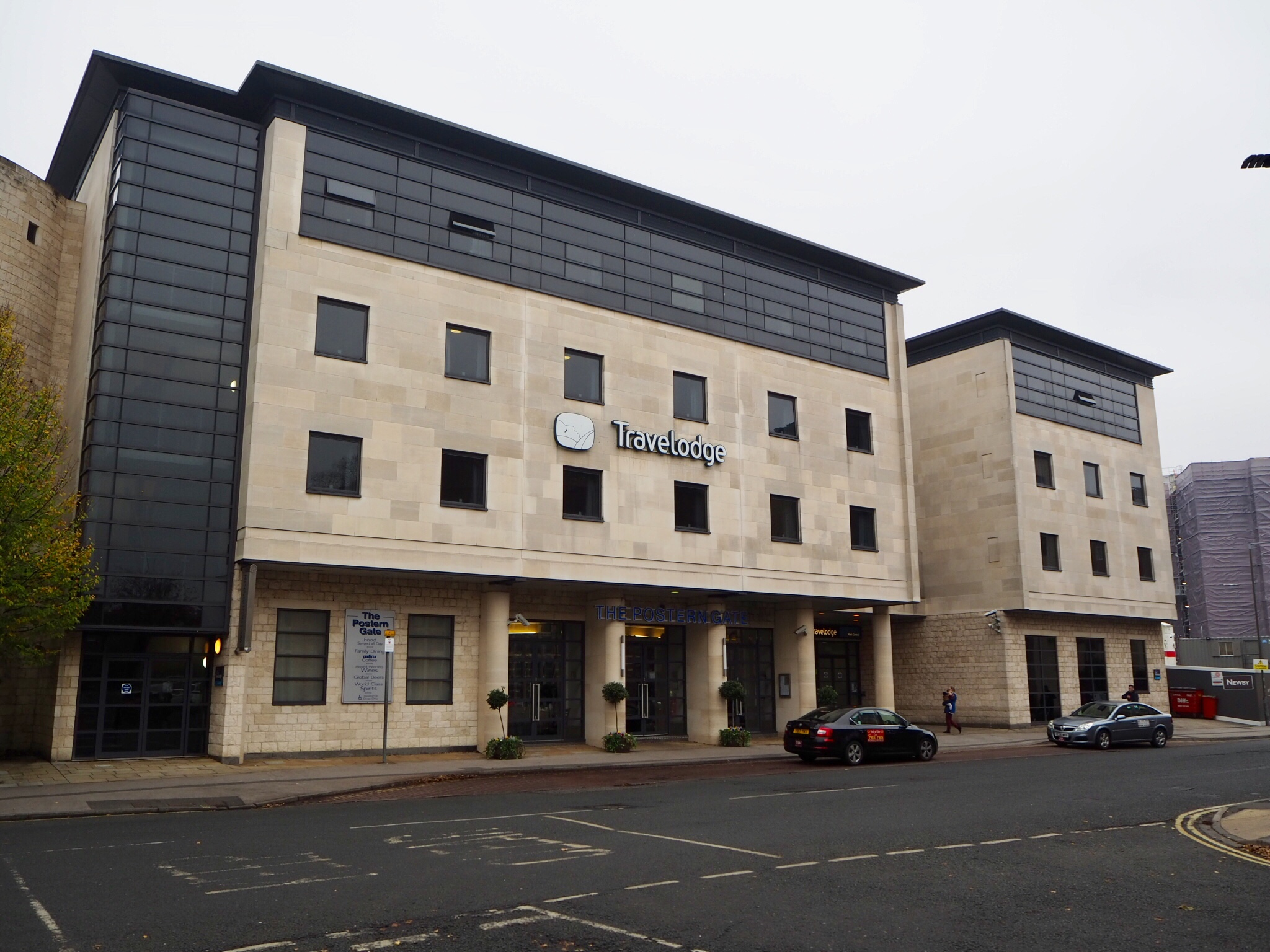
Travelodge & Postern Gate

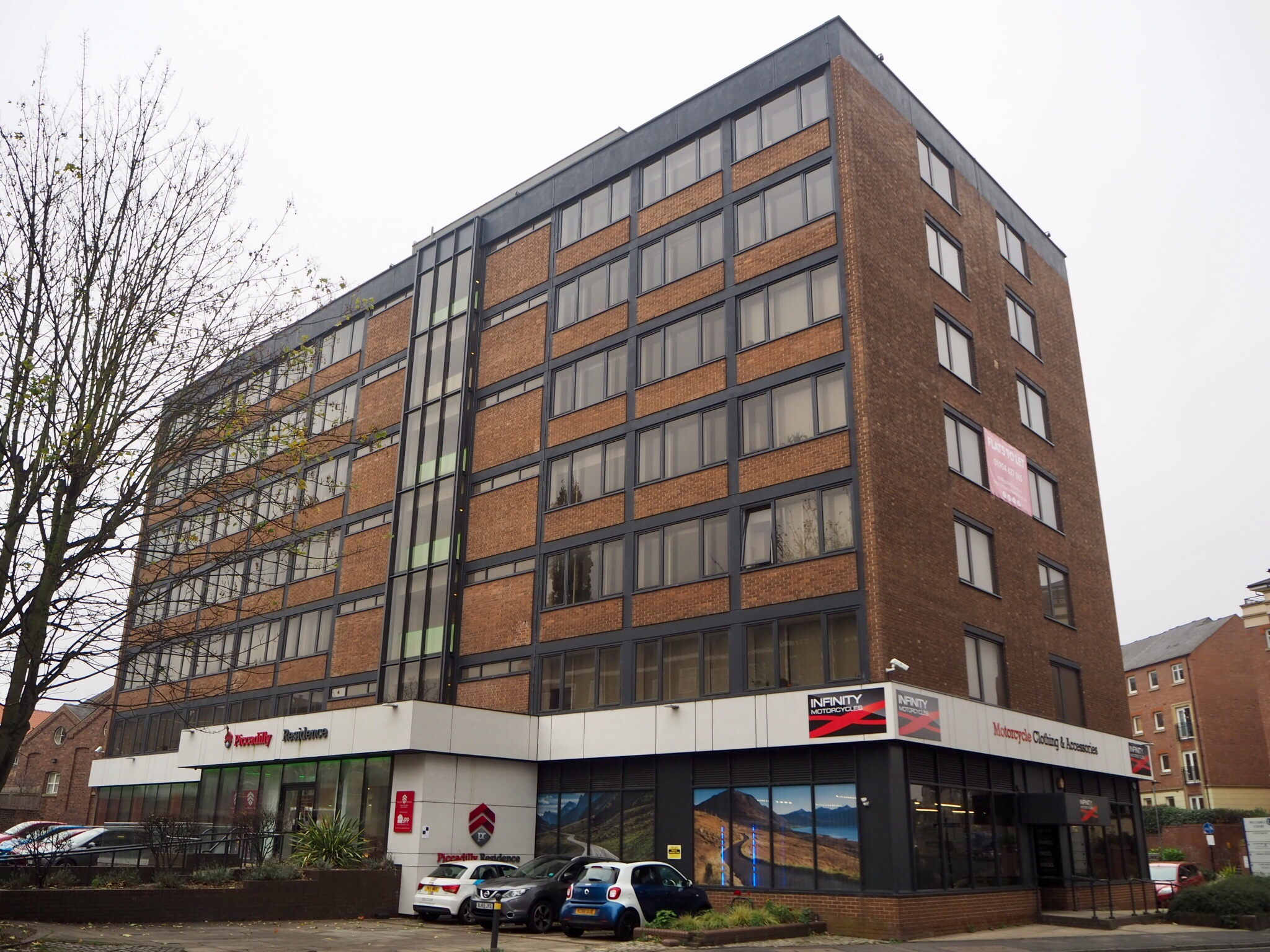
Piccadilly Residence

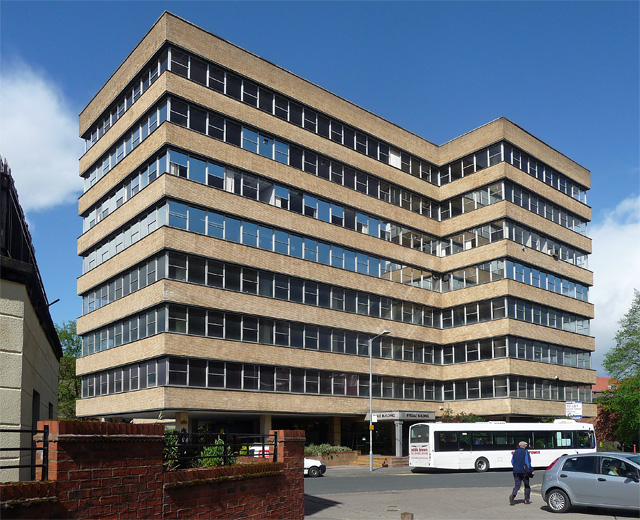
Ryedale House
