= Feasegate =

Street in York, England

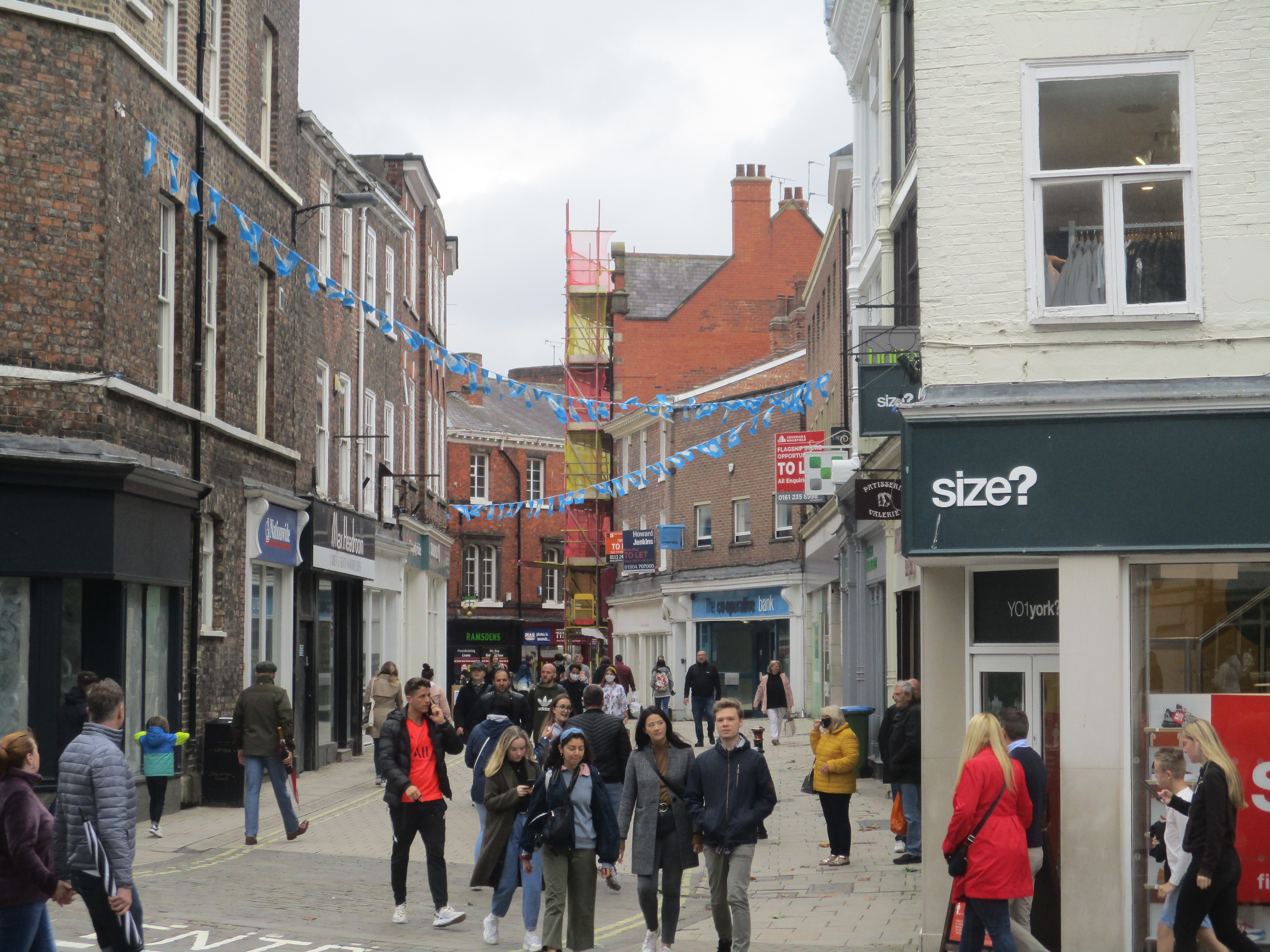
- View south on Feasegate, in 2020
- Location within York
- Location: York, England
- Coordinates: 53.9593°N 1.0831°W
- North end: St Sampson's Square
- South end: Market Street

Feasegate is a street in the city centre of York, in England.

== History ==
The street lies over the south corner tower of the walls of Roman Eboracum. The street was in existence by the Jorvik period, from which period there are substantial deposits, including evidence of craft working. The name of the street comes from the Old Norse word for "cow house", and the street itself was first recorded in 1256.

William Etty was born at the now-demolished 20 Feasegate in 1787. None of the current buildings on the street date to earlier than the 18th century.

The street forms part of the city's central shopping area. However, by 2018, it had only one stand-alone shop, with other properties being empty, or in use for food businesses.

== Layout and architecture ==
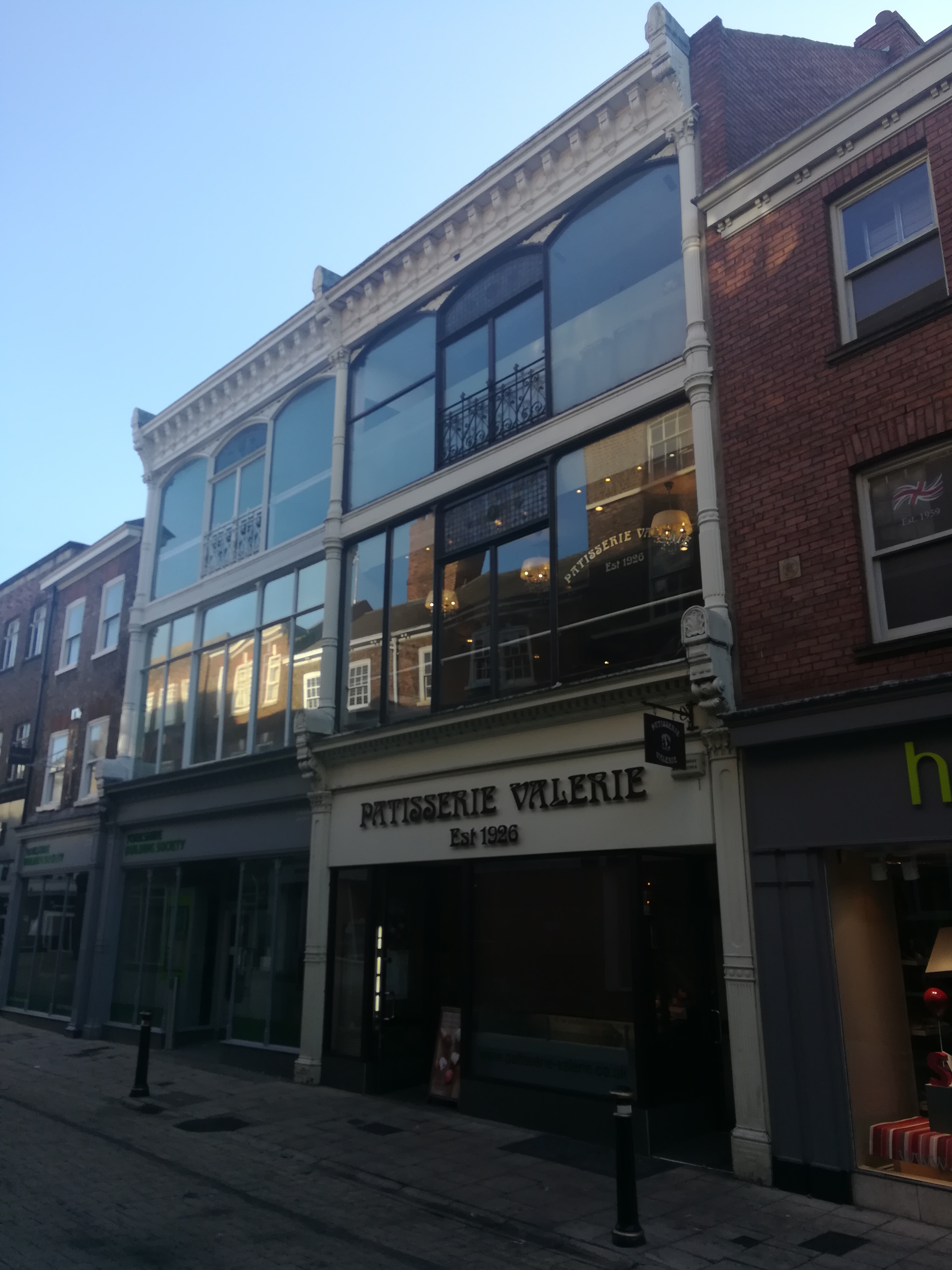
5 and 7 Feasegate

The street runs south from St Sampson's Square to Market Street. Notable buildings on the west side include 1 Feasegate, built in 1770 by Robert Woodhouse; 5 and 7 Feasegate, designed by W. Brown in 1885, and with what Nikolaus Pevsner described as "a remarkably radical piece of work", with a wrought iron a plate glass front; the three-storey 7a Feasegate, built in the late 19th century; and the mid-19th century 19–23 Feasegate. On the east side lies 4 and 6 Feasegate, built about 1840.
