= Market Street (York) =

Street in York, England

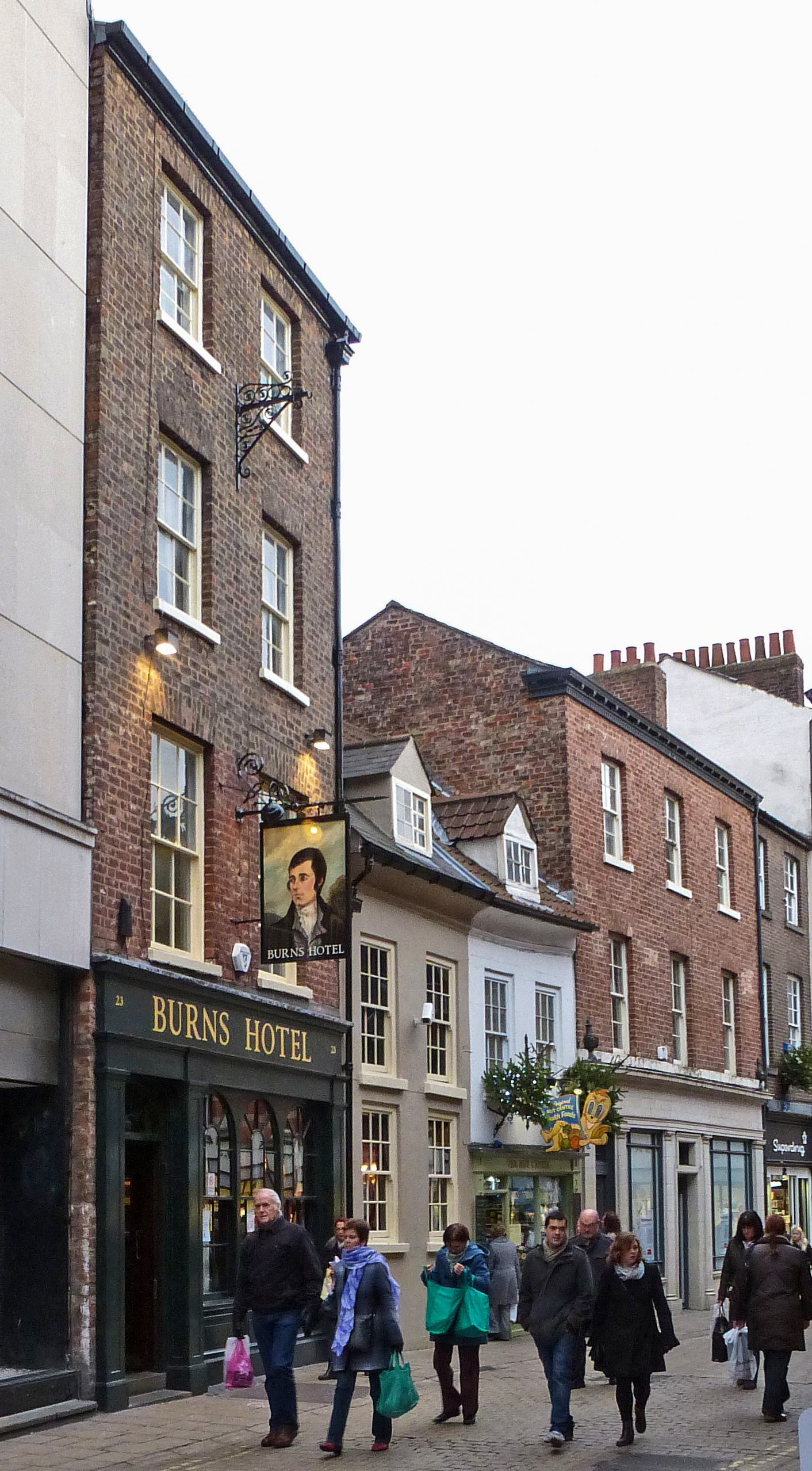
- Buildings on the south-east side of the street
- Location within York
- Former names: Bretgate; Jubbergate
- Location: York, England
- Postal code: YO
- Coordinates: 53.9587°N 1.0822°W
- North east end: Parliament Street
- Major junctions: Feasegate
- South west end: Coney Street; Spurriergate

Market Street is a street in the city centre of York, England.

== History ==
The line of the street lies immediately outside the Roman walls of Eboracum. It is first recorded in the 12th century as Bretgate, believed to mean "street of the Britons". It was later known as Jubbergate. In the 1760s the Little Theatre stood on the street, and in 1796 a Congregationalist chapel was constructed there, becoming a Unitarian chapel in 1816.

In 1836 Parliament Street was constructed, cutting across the middle of Jubbergate and entailing the demolition of the chapel. The longer, south-western section of the road was widened in 1852 and then renamed "Market Street". The street now forms part of the city's central shopping area, although it has been described as "secondary in terms of retail outlets".

== Layout and architecture ==
The street runs north-east from its junction with Coney Street and Spurriergate to Parliament Street. Beyond Parliament Street, its short continuation retains the old name of Jubbergate. Feasegate leads off the north-western side of the street, while Peter Lane leads off the south-eastern side.

Notable buildings on the south-eastern side include: Nos. 5–13, a terrace of five houses with shops from the mid-19th century; No. 15, a four-storey building from around 1840; No. 19, a former mid-19th-century pub which traded as The Tiger until 1988, when it briefly traded as the William Bass before closing in 1991; the early-18th-century No. 21; and the mid-19th-century Burns Hotel pub at No. 23.

On the north-west side stand Nos. 4–6, built in the mid-19th century; and the modern buildings at Nos. 8–10 and No. 20, which are labelled "poorer examples" by City of York Council.
