= Burns Hotel =

Listed pub in York, England

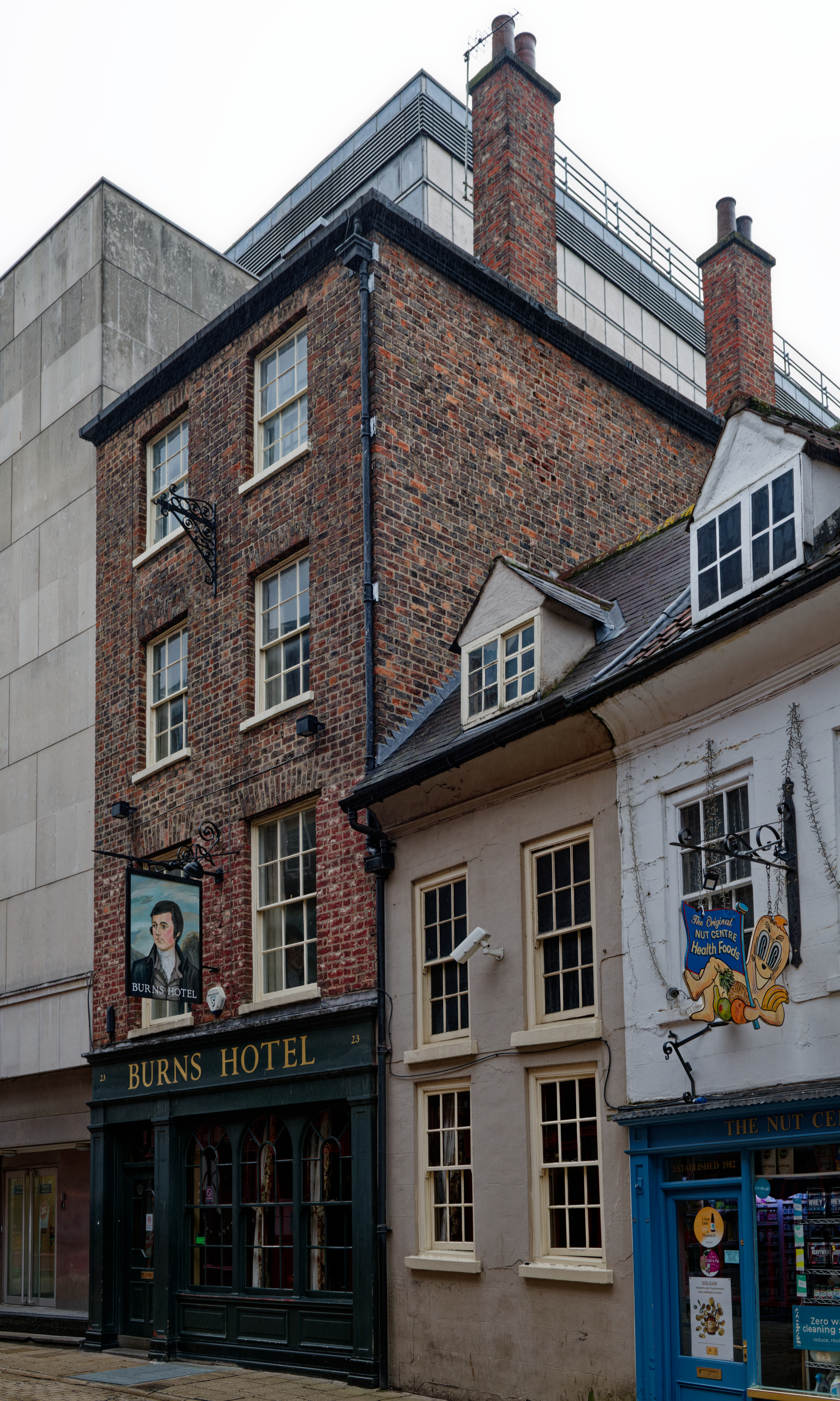
- The pub in 2024
- Interactive map of the Burns Hotel area
- Former names: Hansom Cab

General information
- Type: Public house
- Location: 23 Market Street, York, England
- Coordinates: 53.9588°N 1.0818°W
- Year built: Mid-19th century
- Renovated: 20th century (pub front); 1960s (largely rebuilt)
- Owner: Samuel Smith's

Design and construction
- Designations

Listed Building – Grade II
- Official name: The Burns Hotel
- Designated: 24 June 1983
- Reference no.: 1257372

The Burns Hotel is a Grade II listed public house on Market Street in York, England. It is formed from a mid‑19th‑century pub and an adjoining early‑18th‑century house that once stood as a pair with No. 21. The two buildings were combined in the 20th century, and the pub was remodelled in the 1960s when it traded as the Hansom Cab. It later reverted to its earlier name, and a 2016 amendment to the listing recorded it as the Burns Hotel. As of June 2025, the freehold is owned by Samuel Smith's.

== History ==
The building combines a mid‑19th‑century public house with an adjacent house from the early 18th century, which once formed a matching pair with No. 21. The pub front dates from the 20th century.

The 1851 directory of Kingston-upon-Hull and York records Robert Barnes at the "Burns' Hotel", giving the address as "20 Jubbergate (New)", the earlier name for what became Market Street the following year. The 1885 directory for York records John Garth at the premises, with the address as No. 16. Ordnance Survey maps published in 1892 and 1941 show the pub and the house as separate properties, suggesting that they were brought together later in the 20th century.

The pub was largely rebuilt in the 1960s in a style influenced by the horse‑drawn cabs designed by Joseph Hansom, and at that time it took the name Hansom Cab. In 1968 the site was included within the newly established Central Historic Core conservation area, and when the building was designated as Grade II on 24 June 1983 it was recorded under the Hansom Cab name. It stands in a row next to No. 21 and next door but one to No. 19, both also Grade II listed. The pub later reverted to its earlier name, the Burns Hotel, and a minor amendment to the listing in 2016 noted it under that name. As of June 2025, the freehold is owned by Samuel Smith's.

== Architecture ==
The older part that was originally a house has a stuccoed finish with a shaped eaves line, while the later section is built in mottled brick. The right‑hand return shows different brickwork and has a timber shopfront and deep eaves on small brackets. Both sections have slate roofs; the 19th‑century part has a hipped roof with brick chimneys.

The pub front in 2025

The front is four storeys on the 19th‑century side, with two windows, and two storeys plus an attic on the 18th‑century side. The entrance sits within the pub frontage, framed by pilasters and a moulded cornice, with a partly glazed door and a fanlight. To its right are three tall, round‑headed sash windows. The upper floors have 12‑pane sash windows that reduce in height on each level, set under flat brick arches with painted sills. The earlier section has similar sash windows on the lower floors and a gabled dormer with a small sliding sash in the attic.

== See also ==
- Listed buildings in York (within the city walls, northern part)
