= Spurriergate =

Street in York, England

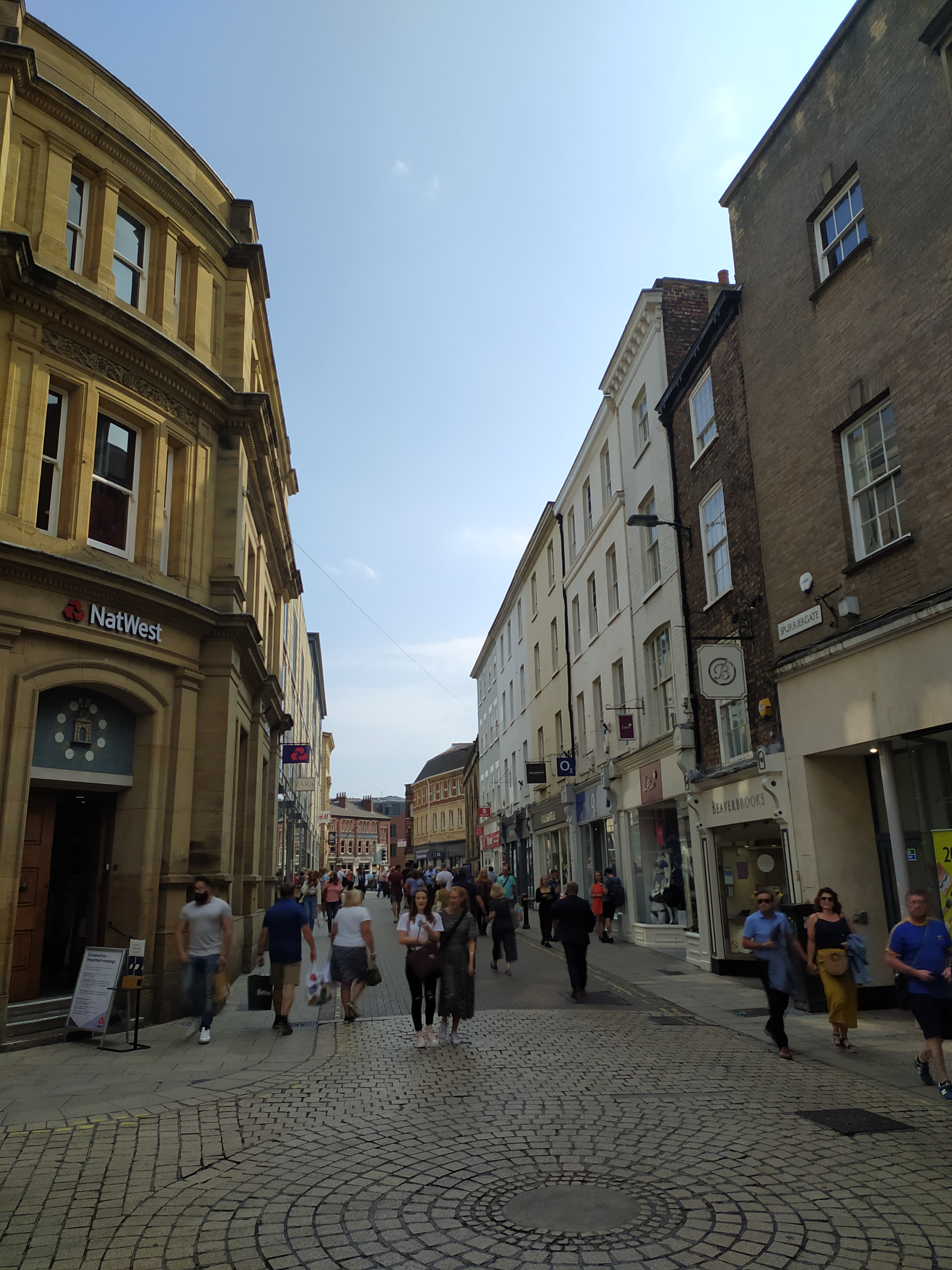
- Looking south-east down Spurriergate, from Coney Street
- Location within York
- Former name: Little Coney Street
- Location: York, England
- Coordinates: 53.9582°N 1.0827°W
- North west end: Coney Street; Market Street
- South east end: High Ousegate; Low Ousegate; Nessgate

Spurriergate is a short street in the city centre of York, in England.

== History ==
The street follows the line of a Roman road which ran between the walls of Eboracum and the River Ouse. In the Mediaeval period, it was regarded as part of Coney Street, sometimes distinguished as Little Coney Street. It was a narrow street, known for its spur makers, and by 1538 this led to it becoming known as "Spurriergate".

The south-west side of the street is dominated by St Michael's Church, and its churchyard lay on both sides. In 1337, two rows of cottages were built along Spurriergate, on part of the churchyard.

In 1770, the width of the street was doubled, leading to the demolition of all the buildings on the north-east side of the street, other than 1 Spurriergate, and their replacement by a terrace, which was itself demolished in 1959. In 1841, the street was widened again, with the length of St Michael's Church being reduced, and all the other buildings being demolished and also replaced by a new terrace.

The street now forms part of the city's central shopping area.

== Layout and architecture ==
The street runs south-east, from the junction of Coney Street and Market Street, to the junction of High Ousegate, Low Ousegate, and Nessgate. On the south-west side, there is a snickelway, the Mediaeval common lane to the river. Notable buildings on the south-west side of the street include St Michael's Church, and the terrace at 4-24 Spurriergate, which is listed. The north-east side is largely occupied by Spurriergate House. The City of York Council is critical of the building, which it describes as having a facade "with no interest or depth", while the corner is "overly dramatic".
