= All Saints' Church, Pavement, York =

Grade I listed church in York, England

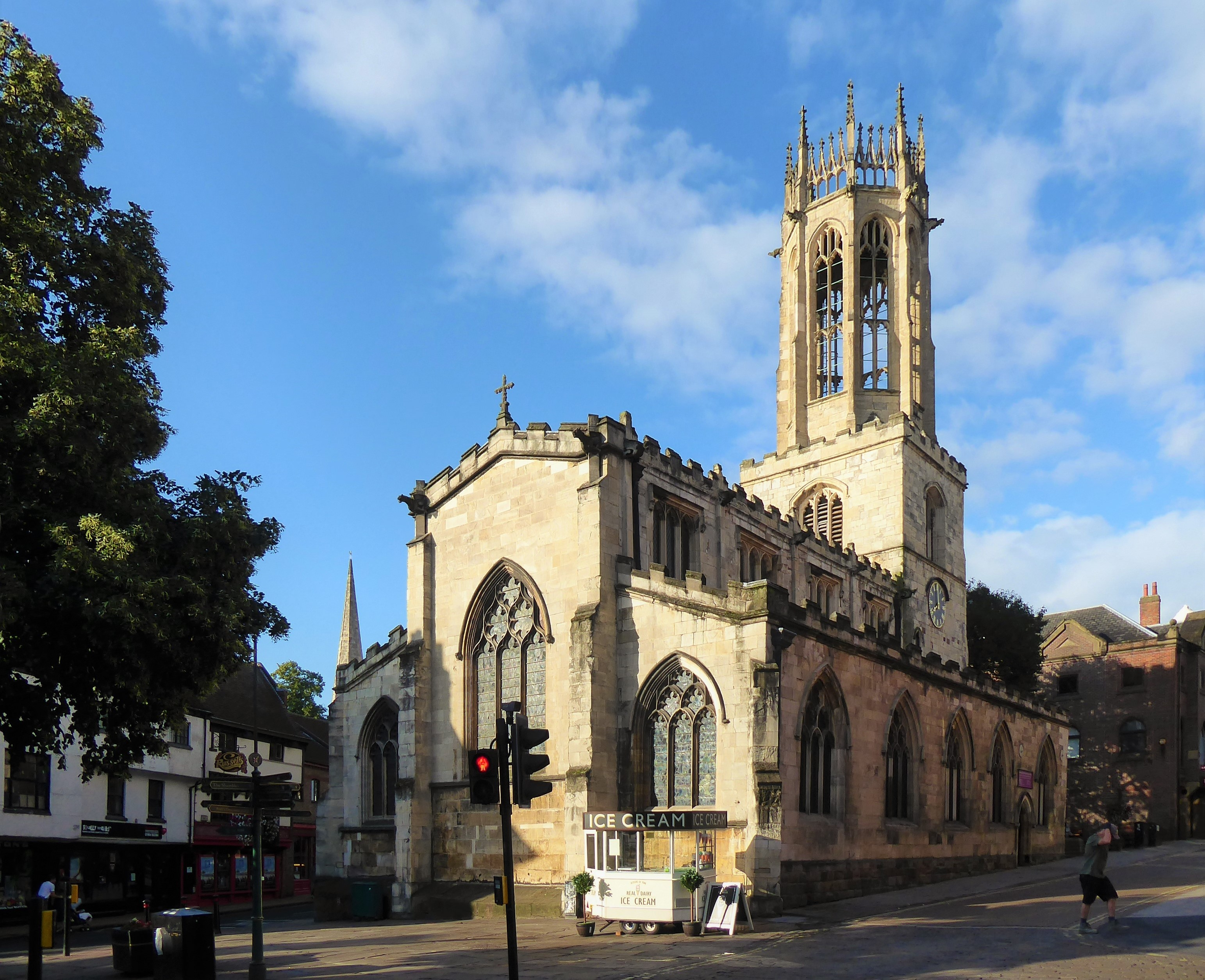
- All Saints' Church, Pavement, York
- All Saints' Church, Pavement, York
- 53°57′31.23″N 1°4′49.31″W
- OS grid reference: SE 60419 51721
- Location: Pavement, York
- Country: England
- Denomination: Church of England
- Churchmanship: Low church/Prayer Book
- Website: www.allsaintspavement.co.uk

History
- Dedication: All Saints

Architecture
- Heritage designation: Grade I listed

Administration
- Province: Province of York
- Diocese: Diocese of York
- Archdeaconry: York
- Deanery: York
- Parish: All Saints, Pavement with St Crux and St Michael Spurriergate, York

Clergy
- Rector: Interregnum

All Saints' Church is a Grade I listed parish church in the Church of England on Pavement in the city of York. Services are from the Book of Common Prayer.

== History ==
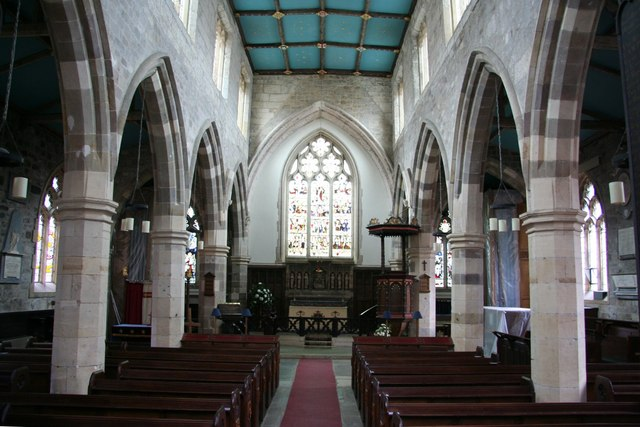
Interior

St Saviour's location

The church dates from the 14th century. The chancel was demolished in 1780 and the east end was rebuilt. The north wall and the west end were rebuilt in 1834.

The lantern was rebuilt in 1837. The vestry was added between 1850 and 1855. The church was restored in 1887 by George Edmund Street when the stonework was cleaned, the pinnacles restored, and the central east window fitted with stained glass by Charles Eamer Kempe.

It was enlarged in 1912.

The church is the guild and civic church for the city of York, and the regimental church for the Royal Dragoon Guards.

In 1954 the church was united with the parish of St Saviour's Church, York when St Saviour's was declared redundant.

== Memorials ==
- Sergeant Major John Polety (d. 1829)
- Charles Polety (d. 1838)
- Tate Wilkinson (d. 1803)
- Jane Wilkinson (d. 1826)
- Sir Robert Crathorn (d. 1482)
- Robert Askwith (d. 1579) (originally in St Crux's Church, York)
- Roger de Moreton (d. 1382)
- Isabella de Moreton (d. 1412) (originally in St Saviour's Church, York)
- Ursula Wyvill (d. 1790)
- Robert Bishopricke Surgeon (d. 1814)
- Henry Richards (d. 1783)

== Organ ==
The organ appears to date from the 18th century and has been rebuilt over the years. A specification of the organ can be found on the National Pipe Organ Register.

== Terms ==
The tower was designed to provide a light for travellers. However, despite having a famous lantern, the tower does not fit the criteria for a lantern tower: that is a tower with a special clerestory above the ceiling (or vaults) of the nave (or an aisle) which is open to the church interior below the tower, contributing to its lighting.

== See also ==
- Grade I listed buildings in the City of York
- Listed buildings in York (within the city walls, southern part)
