= Parliament Street (York) =

Street in York, England

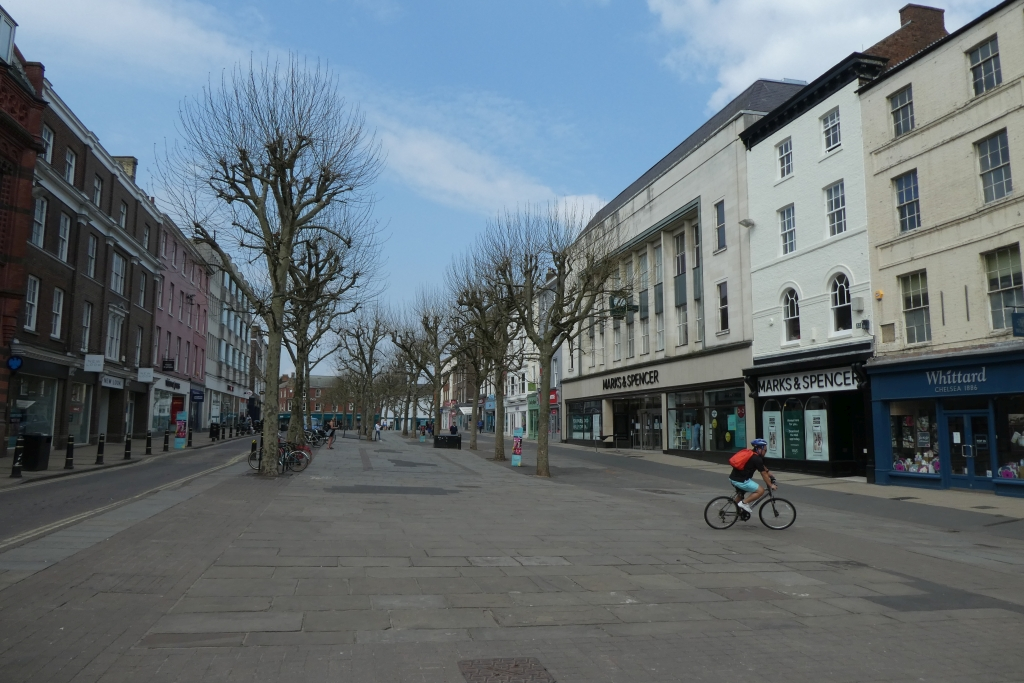
- The street, from the south
- Location within York
- Location: York, England
- Coordinates: 53.9590°N 1.0813°W
- North end: St Sampson's Square
- Major junctions: Market Street; Jubbergate
- South end: Pavement; Piccadilly; High Ousegate; Coppergate

Construction
- Commissioned: 1833
- Construction start: 1834
- Completion: 1840

Parliament Street is a major shopping street in the city centre of York, in England. It was the site of the city's main street market from 1836 to 1955, and was largely pedestrianised in the 1980s.

== History ==
Until the 19th-century, what is now Parliament Street was covered with buildings, facing onto Pavement, Jubbergate, and St Sampson's Square. The markets in Pavement and St Sampson's Square had become increasingly crowded, and after considering the possibilities of enlarging them, or establishing a new market on various potential sites, the city corporation decided to construct a broad street linking the two, which would become a new marketplace.

In 1833, the city obtained an act of Parliament, the York Improvement and Markets Act 1833 (3 & 4 Will. 4. c. lxii), permitting the setting up of a new market, and held a competition for the best design. The surveyors Pickersgill and Oates took the £30 top prize. In February 1834, the city began demolishing the buildings on the site, and from 1835 to 1840 laid out the new road, which was named "Parliament Street", constructing large buildings on each site of the street. These are mostly of four stories, and were built with shops on the ground floor, and living quarters above. All the buildings have since been converted to have offices above, and some blocks have been entirely rebuilt.

The Parliament Street Market opened in 1836, running every day, but with Saturday as the principal market day. It was the city's main market until 1955, when it completed a move to what is now the Shambles Market. In 1989, a competition was held to redesign the street, and this led to it being largely pedestrianised, with a single carriageway on one side. A variety of High Street shops now line the street, including a large branch of Marks and Spencers, and it is also used to host a variety of festivals and temporary markets.

== Layout and architecture ==
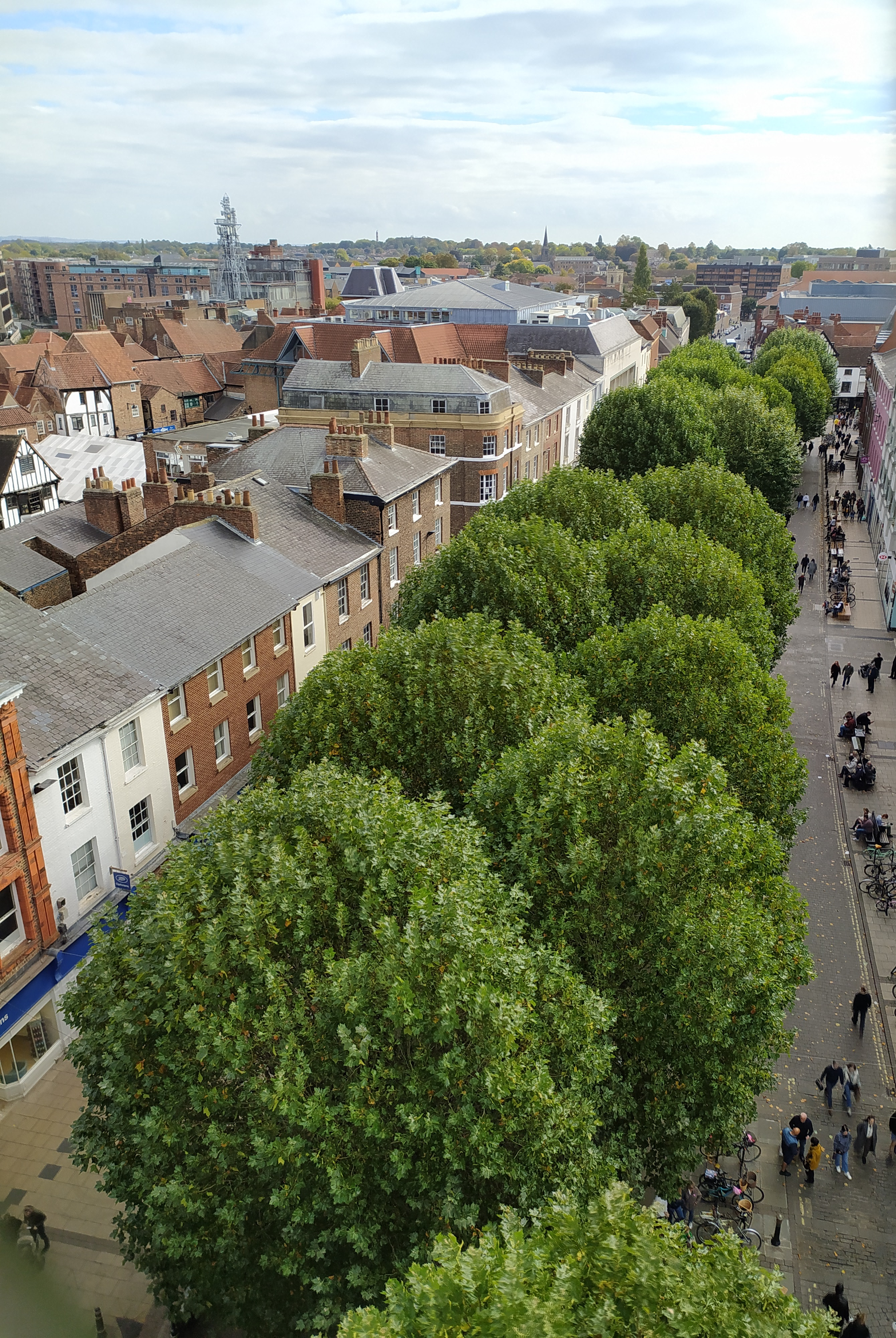
Aerial view of Parliament Street, from St Sampson's Square

The northern end of the street is at St Sampson's Square, and it runs south to the junction of Pavement, Piccadilly, High Ousegate and Coppergate. In the middle, the surviving part of Jubbergate leads east to the Shambles Market, while Market Street leads off to the west.

The York City and County Bank was one of the grandest original buildings on the street, but was demolished in 1971. Most of the buildings on the street are listed: the Barclays Bank built in 1901, 8 and 9 Parliament Street, 14, 15, 16, 17 and 18, and 19 to 21 Parliament Street on the west side, and 22, 23 and 24, 29 and 30, 31 and 32, 33, 34, 35 and 36, 37, 38, 39, 44, and 45 and 46 Parliament Street on the east side.

A fountain was located in the middle of the street, but it was removed in 2018 after it was deemed to be beyond repair.
