= St Michael's Church, Spurriergate, York =

Grade I listed former church in York, England

St Michael's Church
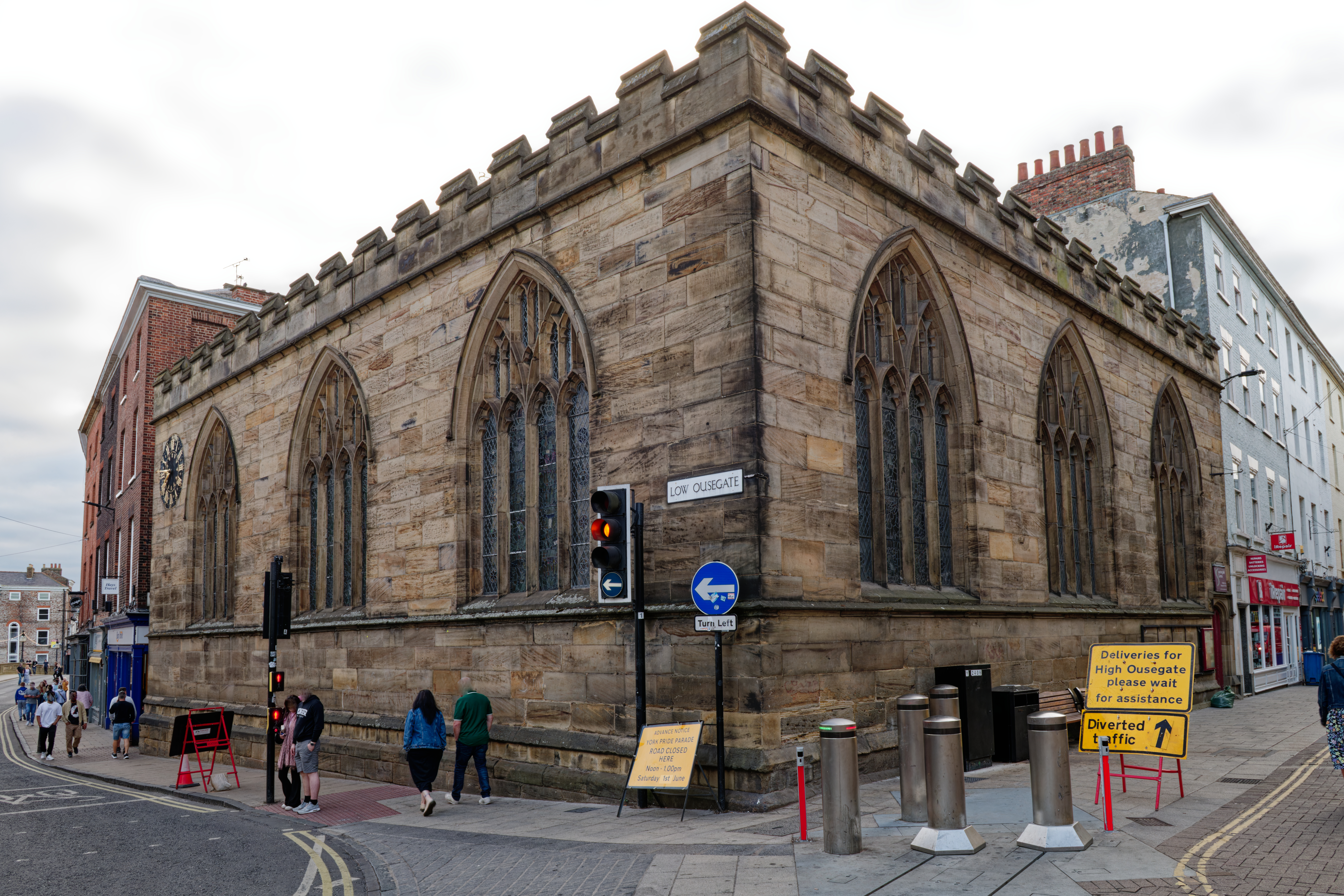
- The former church in 2024
- St Michael's Church
- 53°57′28.1″N 1°4′57.4″W
- OS grid reference: SE 60294 51694
- Location: Spurriergate, York
- Country: England
- Previous denomination: Church of England

History
- Dedication: St Michael

Architecture
- Heritage designation: Grade I listed
- Designated: 14 June 1954
- Style: Decorated Gothic
- Groundbreaking: Late 12th century
- Completed: Mid 15th century
- Closed: 1984

St Michael's Church is a Grade I listed former parish church in the Church of England, on Spurriergate in York, England.

== History ==
The church dates from the 12th century with elements from the 14th and 15th centuries. It was reduced in size in 1821 by J. B. and W. Atkinson. The foundation stone of the new wall of the east end was laid by the rector on 15 January 1821. Work was completed on 16 June 1822.

The tower was lowered between 1966 and 1967. The church was declared redundant and closed in 1984. The building re-opened as a restaurant and cafe in 1989. The conversion retained a small chapel upstairs which is used occasionally for worship.

== Clock ==
The exterior west end of the south wall contains a painted clock face. The clock mechanism inside is inscribed with "Reconstructed by G. J. F. Newey in 1896". The clock was originally inset to the tower, but after its lowering in 1966, it was moved to its current location.

== Organ ==
The church contained an organ by Denman and Son which was installed in 1890. It had nine stops on the swell, seven on the great, two on the pedal and cost just over £300 (equivalent to £33,330 in 2025). It was transferred in 1972 to All Saints' Church, Castleford. A specification of the organ can be found on the National Pipe Organ Register. The church also contained a three stop continuo organ by Grant Degens and Bradbeer, dating from 1969, which was moved to Lund Parish Church in 1973 and subsequently Southwell Minster. A specification of the organ can be found on the National Pipe Organ Register.

== See also ==
- Grade I listed buildings in the City of York
- Listed buildings in York (within the city walls, northern part)
