= Medieval parish churches of York =

Coordinates: 53.958°N 1.082°W

York had around 45 parish churches in 1300. Twenty survive, in whole or in part, a number surpassed in England only by Norwich, and 12 are used for worship. This article consists of a list of medieval churches which still exist in whole or in part, and a list of medieval churches which are known to have existed in the past but have been completely demolished.

In 1086, the Domesday Book listed eight churches and a minster (not the current building). The number had declined to thirty-nine by 1428 due to taxation; nineteen medieval churches are in use today.

== Surviving medieval churches and those of which fragments remain in situ ==
=== All Saints, North Street ===
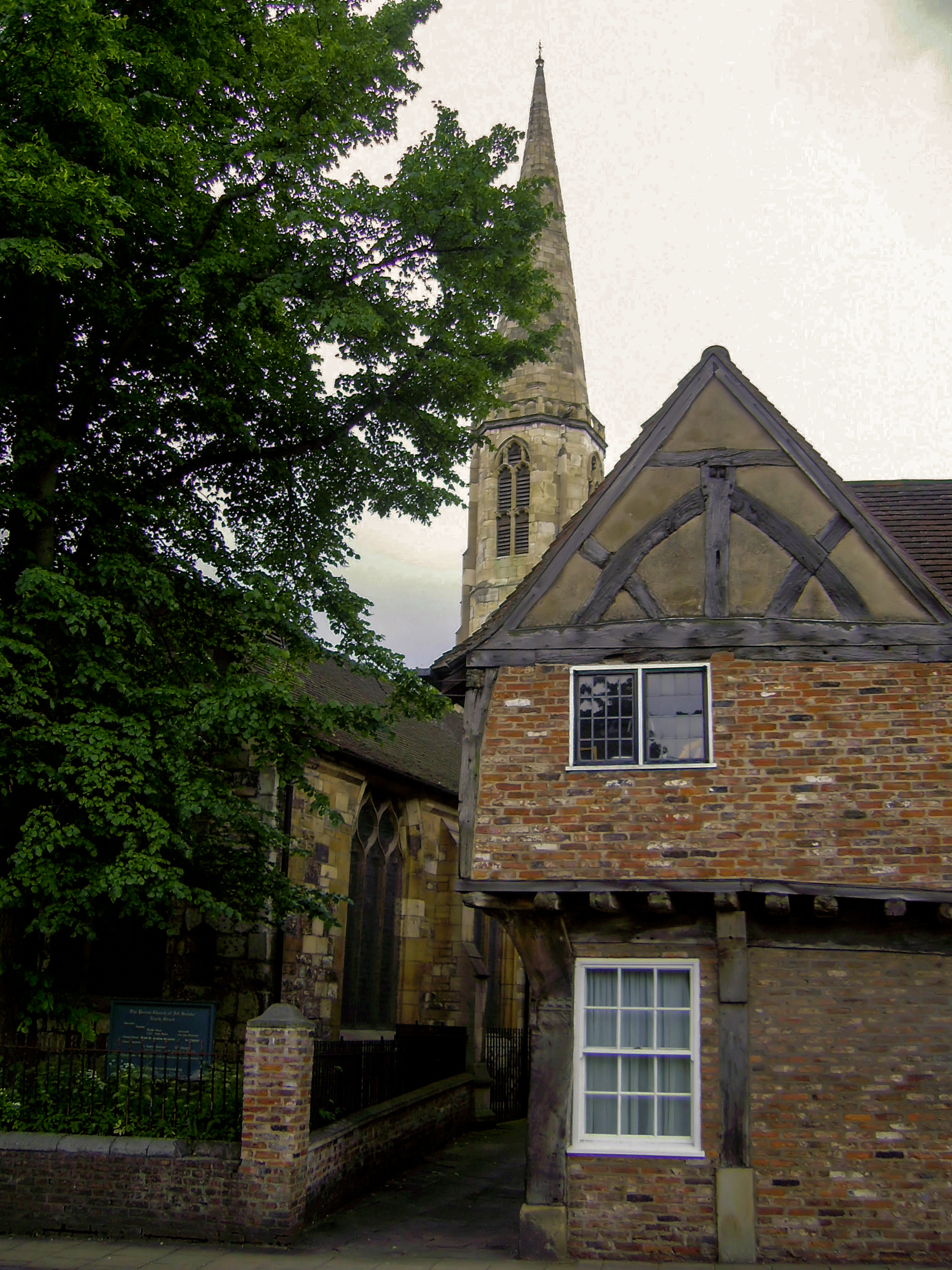
All Saints, North Street

All Saints was founded in the eleventh century, but most of the present building is fourteenth and fifteenth century. The land on which the church was erected was reputedly donated by Ralph de Paganel, a Norman tenant-in-chief whose name is commemorated in the Yorkshire village of Hooton Pagnell. All Saints Church is attractively situated near the River Ouse and next to a row of fifteenth-century timber-framed houses. Externally, the main feature is the impressive tower with a tall octagonal spire. Attached to the west end is an anchorhold or hermitage built of concrete in the 1920s on the site of a house occupied by a hermit on the early 15th century. Internally there are fifteenth-century hammerbeam roofs and much medieval stained glass, including the Corporal Works of Mercy (derived from Matt 25:31ff) and the "Prick of Conscience" windows. The latter depicts the fifteen signs of the End of the World. The church has an Anglo-Catholic heritage and there are many images of devotion.

=== All Saints, Pavement ===
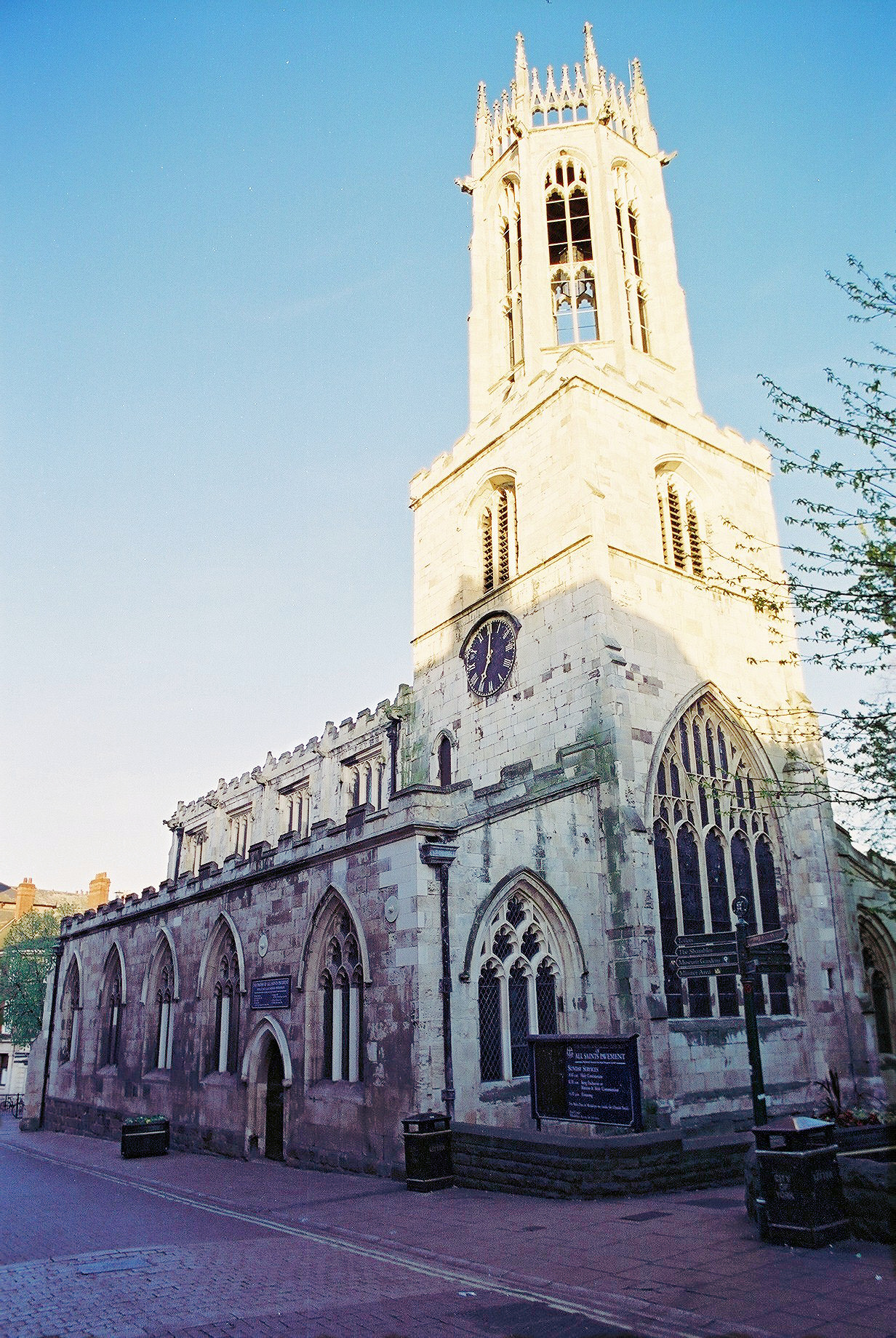
All Saints, Pavement

A church has been on the site of All Saints since before the Norman Conquest, but the present building is almost entirely fourteenth- and fifteenth-century. As with St. Denys (below), part of the building was demolished in the late eighteenth century: the east end (chancel and aisles) was removed so that the market-place in Pavement could be expanded. The present east end (originally the crossing) was rebuilt to a design by George Edmund Street in 1887, but the remains of the medieval chancel-arch can still be seen above the east window inside the church.

The most noticeable feature of the church's exterior is the octagonal lantern-tower of about 1400, which for many years housed a light to guide travellers. Inside, there is a hexagonal pulpit of 1634, and several fittings originally from St Saviour and St Crux, whose parishes, among others, were united with All Saints'. Most notable are the west window of fine 15th-century York glass with scenes from the life of Christ, with iconography possibly reflecting the Miracle Plays; the east windows by Kempe; and the 12th-century 'doom' knocker on the north door.

The author Angelo Raine was Rector of All Saints'.

=== Holy Trinity, Goodramgate ===
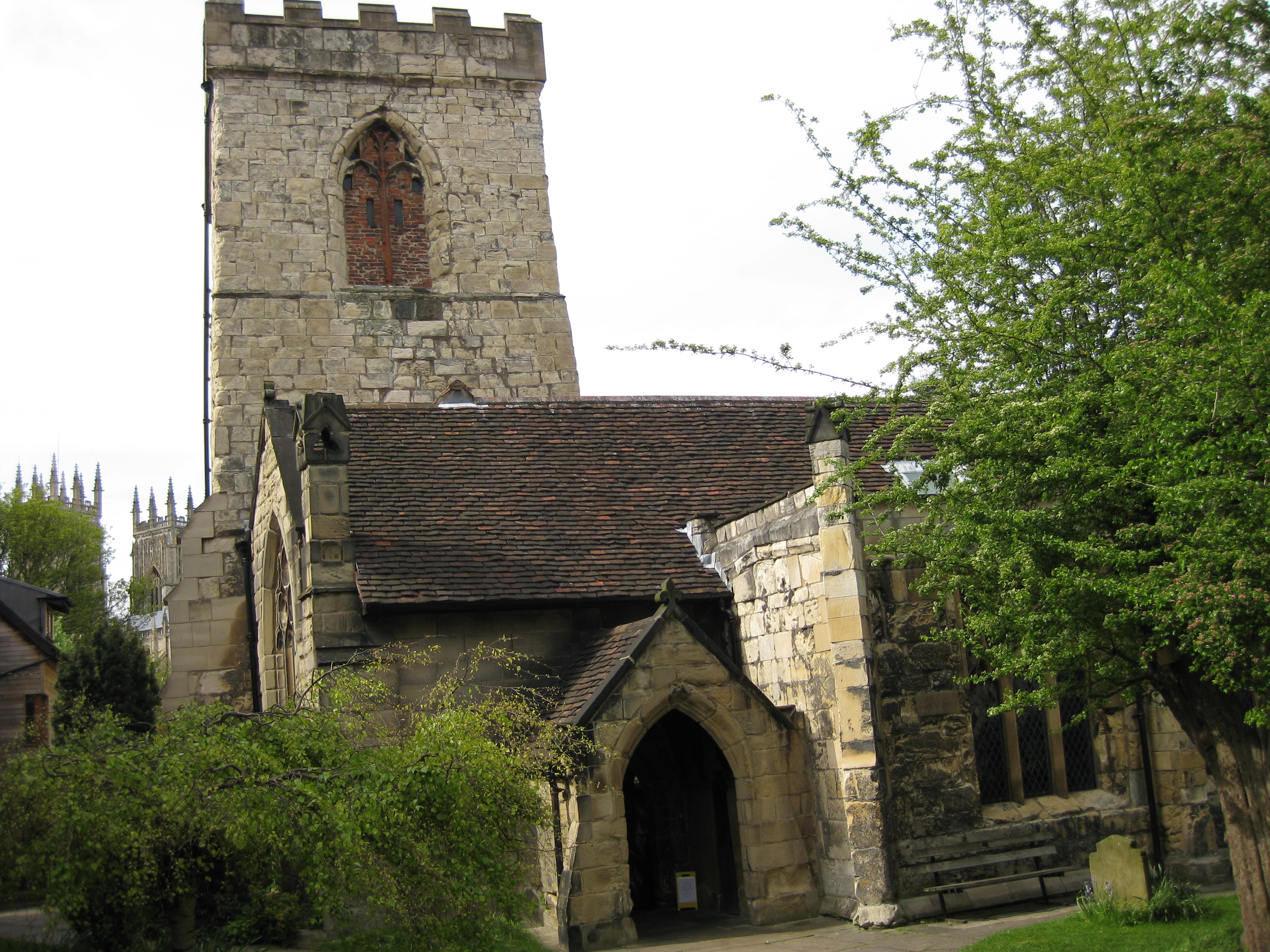
Holy Trinity, Goodramgate

Founded in the first half of the 12th century, its architecture is that of the 13th and 14th centuries, with woodwork and pews of the 17th and 18th centuries. The church is a good example of how a church was arranged after the Reformation. The stained glass over the altar is a gift of John Walker, Rector and is late Perpendicular of 1470–1480, a rare date in York glass. The churchyard is secluded behind rows of old buildings, accessed by narrow alleyways. It is about as close as you can get to how a church would have looked after the Reformation: dark, quiet, homely, with uneven floors, high box pews and plain walls. With candlelight it must perfectly evoke the late 17th century. It is a Grade I listed building.

The church dates back to the 12th century, although the current building owes rather more to the 13th–15th centuries: although part of the Chancel dates from the 12th century, the South Aisle and Chapel date from 1340, the Tower and North Aisle were built in the first half of the 15th century. The box pews are recorded as being repaired in 1633, and new ones added in 1700–1725. The pulpit dates from 1695.

But the church's most notable feature – as is so often the case in York – is its medieval stained glass. The windows are decorated and perpendicular in style. The best is the late Perpendicular east window: this dates from 1470 to 1471 and was presented by the then rector, John Walker. The glass depicts saints, including St George and St Christopher, as well as heraldic shields, around a central panel in which a representation of God as the Trinity holding the dead Christ, with the donors at his feet. Other features include a simple 15th-century font and wall plaques recalling Lord Mayors of York, including the 'Railway King', George Hudson.

The church is in the care of the Churches Conservation Trust. It was declared redundant on 29 June 1971, and was vested in the Trust on 7 November 1972.

=== Holy Trinity, Micklegate ===
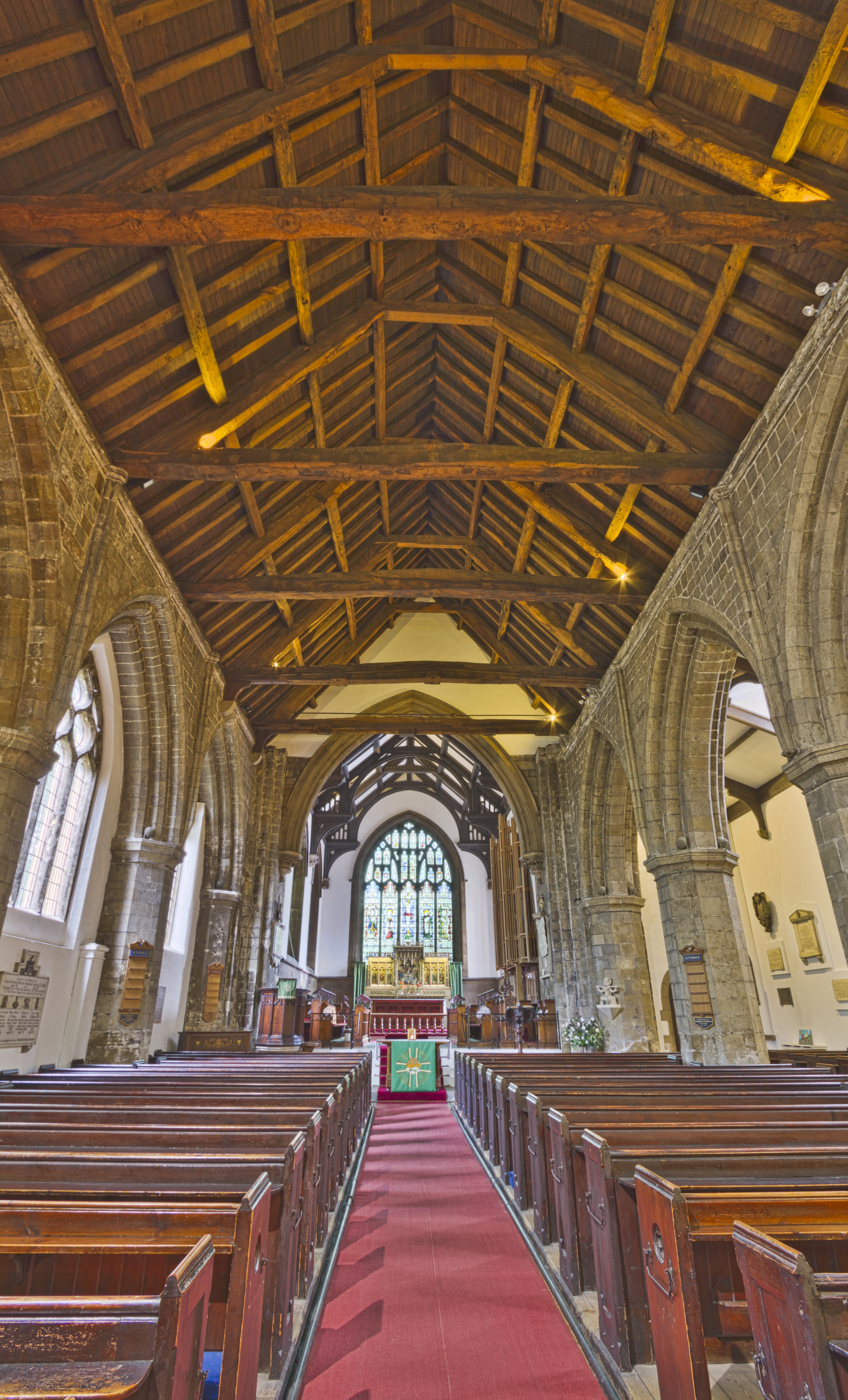
Inside Holy Trinity Micklegate

The nave and tower of Holy Trinity, Micklegate are remnants of the Benedictine priory church, itself on the site of the pre-Conquest church. The present five bay aisled nave is late 12th and early 13th century, the tower built after 1453. The church quickly fell into serious decay after the dissolution of the priory in 1538, and the extensive restoration from the 1850s onward included a chancel and vestry 1886–7 and a north porch and rebuilt west front 1902–5. The church now has an exhibition for visitors on the monastic life of the priory.

=== St Crux, Pavement ===
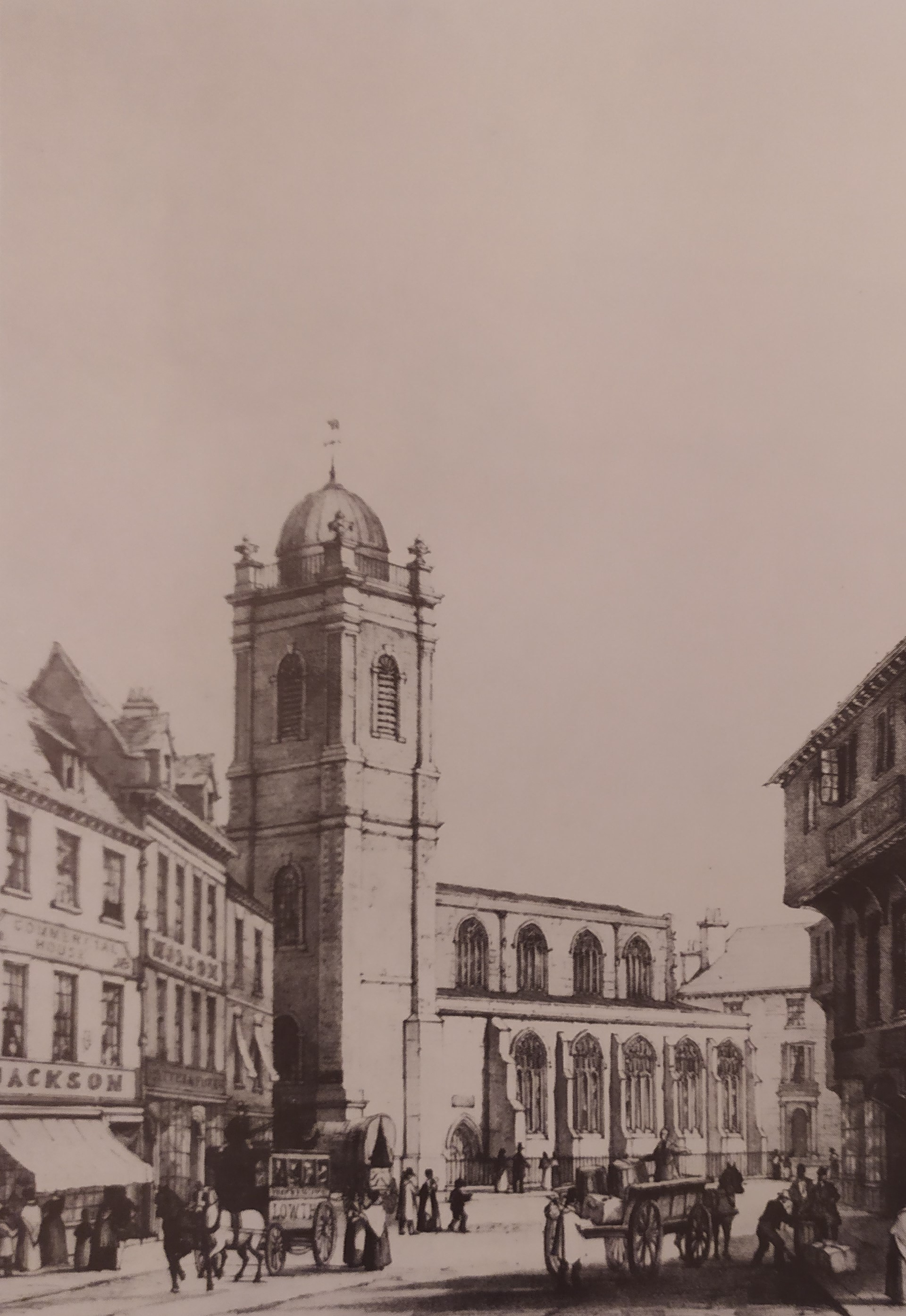
St Crux in about 1843

St Crux, (literally Holy Cross), was the largest medieval parish church in York after its rebuilding in 1424, and a brick tower was added in 1697. It was closed around 1880 after becoming unsafe, and attempts to raise sufficient funds to rebuild it were unsuccessful. It was demolished in 1887, although some of the church's stonework was used to build the St Crux Parish Hall at the bottom of the Shambles. The Hall contains a number of monuments from the old church, and other fittings are now in All Saints, Pavement, to which the parish of St Crux was joined in 1885. Part of the stone wall of the fifteenth-century north aisle is still to be seen, and forms part of the southern exterior wall of no. 23 the Shambles and of the south wall of the Snickelway which leads to Whip-Ma-Whop-Ma Gate. The Hall is currently used as a café.

=== St Cuthbert, Peasholme Green ===
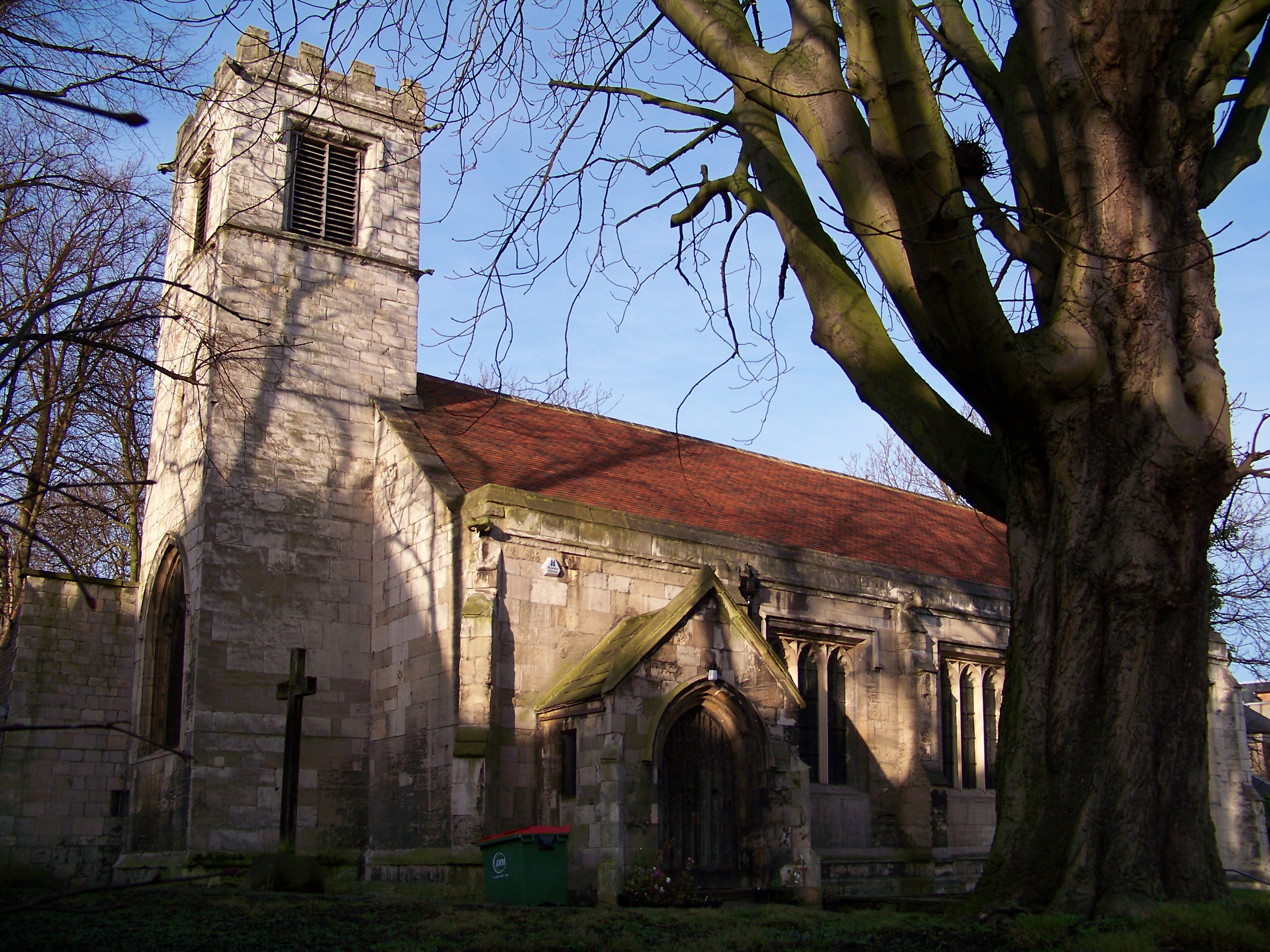
St Cuthbert seen from Peasholme Green

St Cuthbert's Church was built near Layerthorpe Postern on York city walls near Layerthorpe. It has Rectors from 1239. The existing building dates back to 1430 when it was restored and largely rebuilt by William de Bowes, who was Lord Mayor of York in 1417 and 1428, and member of parliament in four parliaments.

The Bowes family lived in what is now the Black Swan Inn, some 110 yards (100 m) from the church. This passed to the Thompson family, one of whose daughters was the mother of James Wolfe, hero of Quebec. Thus the Church has been called "The Cradle of Canada". This is commemorated by the flags of Canada and the US which adorn the church.

The church is linked with St Michael-le-Belfrey and currently used for 'alternative' forms of worship.

=== St Denys, Walmgate ===
St Denys's Church, York stands in a churchyard raised above the level of the surrounding roads. It is dedicated to St Denys, the patron saint of France and of Paris. There is evidence that the site was formerly occupied by buildings of the Roman and Viking or Anglo-Saxon periods. The present church is the chancel of the original medieval building, and occupies about one-third of its space – the west end was demolished in 1797, and the central tower (whose spire had been damaged in the Siege of York in 1644, and was later struck by lightning in 1700) was replaced by the present tower in 1847.

=== St Helen, Stonegate ===
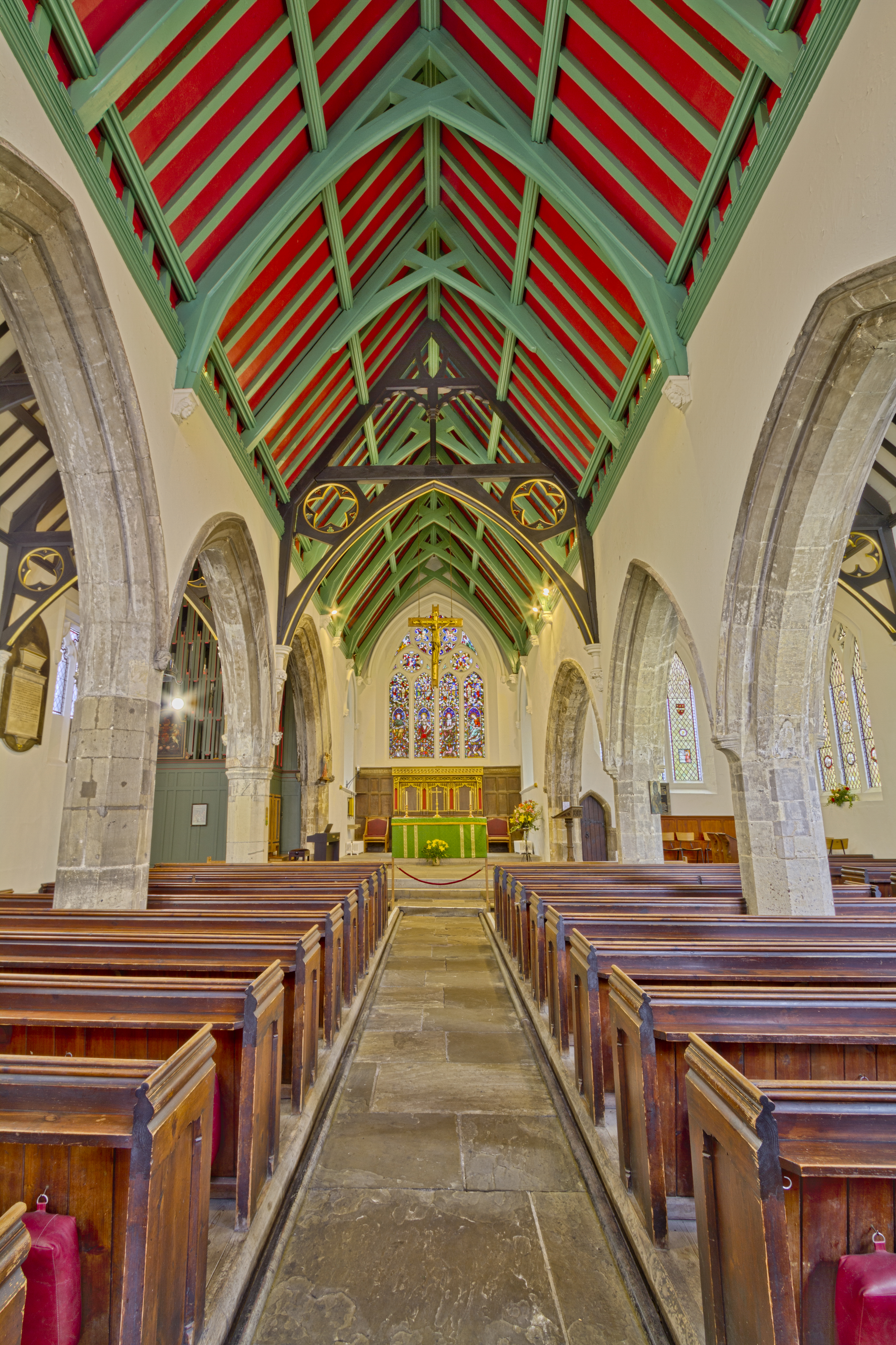
Inside St Helen's Church

St Helen's Church, Stonegate, York faces St Helen's Square, which incorporates the historic churchyard. The earliest evidence of date is the mid-to-late-12th-century font, but like other medieval churches in the city it is probably a pre-Conquest foundation. Though rebuilt twice, in the 1550s and 1857–58, the church is essentially medieval. The main exceptions are the tower (c. 1814) and chancel (1858). The west window incorporates significant amounts of 14th-and 15th-century glass.

=== St John, Micklegate ===
St John's Micklegate is simple rectangular building, with the earliest parts including the tower base dating from the 12th century. Much of the current building dates from the 15th century, though the east end was rebuilt in the middle of the 19th to enable the widening of North Street and there was extensive restoration at that period. The church closed 1934. It later became the Institute of Architecture of the York Academic Trust, which merged into the new University of York. The university used it as an Arts Centre in the 1960s, but it was subsequently sold and is now a bar. A particular item of interest is the bells, whose ropes hang around the bar float! There is occasional ringing, however not very often.

=== St Lawrence, Lawrence Street ===
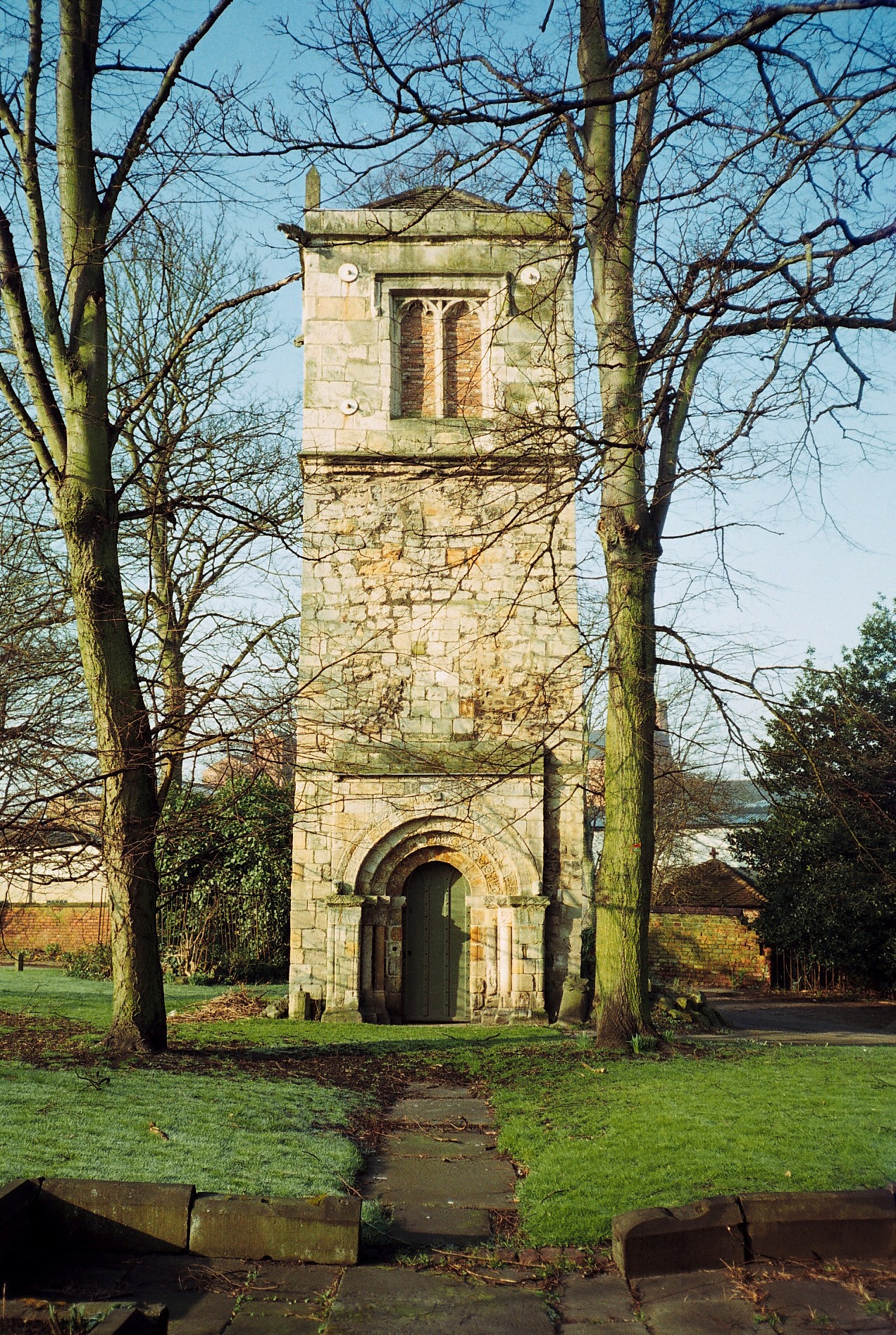
The tower of old St Lawrence's Church

The present St Lawrence building is Victorian, but in its churchyard is the small tower of its predecessor (in which Sir John Vanbrugh was married in 1719). This dates back to the twelfth century, although its top storey was added in the fifteenth century. The tower, which is in the care of the Churches Conservation Trust, has an impressive Norman doorway, formerly one of the entrances to the nave. The old nave and chancel is marked out in medieval and 18th-19th century gravestones, including those of the Heskeths and Yarburghs of Heslington Hall. The medieval font, along with four early-Victorian windows and some earlier furnishings, can still be seen in the 'new' church.

=== St Margaret, Walmgate ===
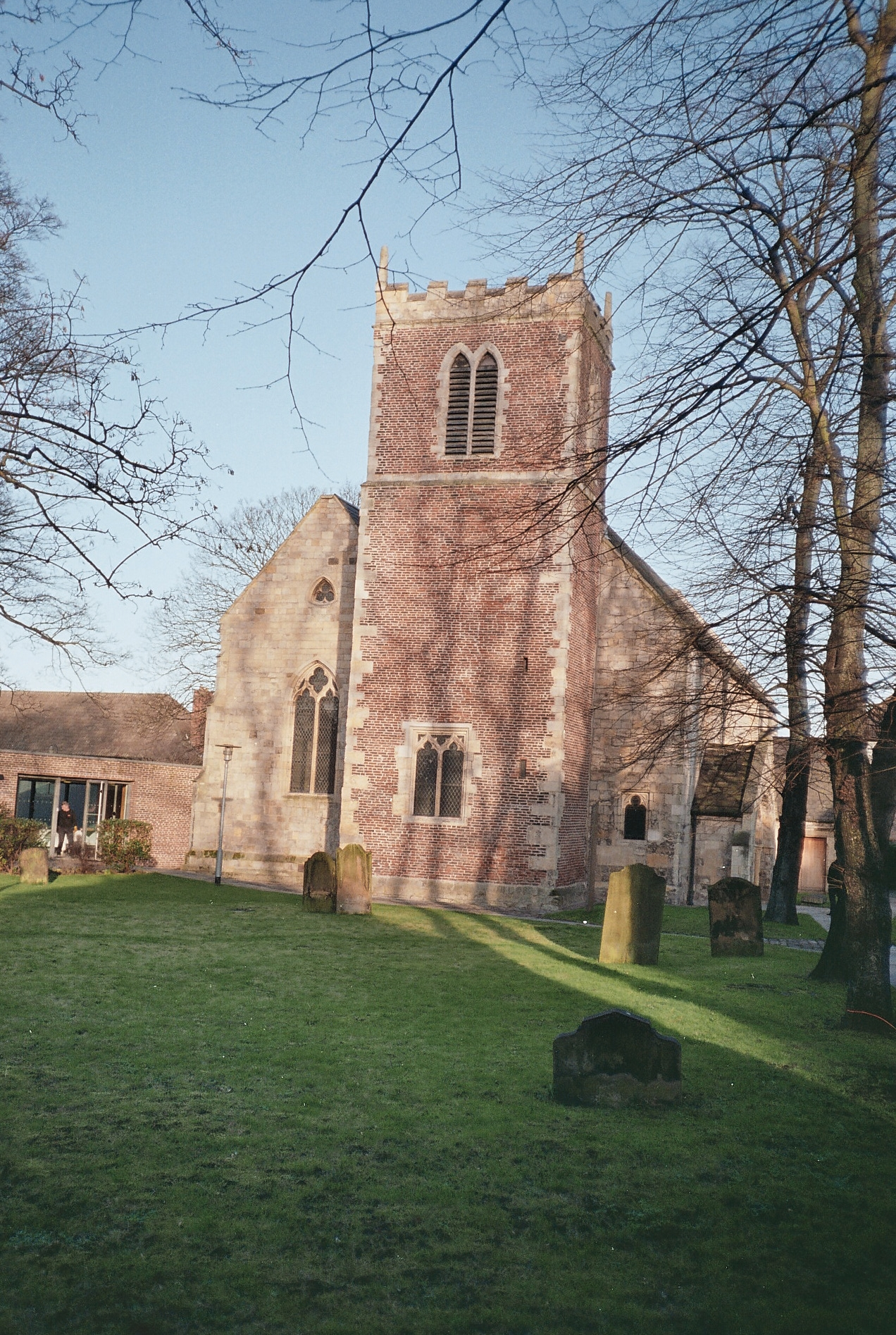
St Margaret, Walmgate

St Margaret is one of the two medieval churches that survive from the original six in the Walmgate area (the other survivor is St Denys, above). It dates back to at least the 12th century, though most of the present structure is 14th century. The major exceptions are the red brick tower, built in 1684 after the collapse of a previous tower, and the Romanesque tunnel-vaulted south porch which is enriched with carvings of the signs of the zodiac and the labours of the Months. The porch originally belonged to the church of St Nicholas's Hospital, which was situated outside Walmgate Bar and was ruined during the Civil War. It was moved to St Margaret's at about the same time as the rebuilding of the tower.

St Margaret was restored and enlarged in 1850–1, but its congregation gradually declined and it was declared redundant in 1974. It was subsequently used as a store for the York Theatre Royal until its adaptation for use as a performance space and conference facility by the National Centre for Early Music, which opened in 2000. The adaptation received a commendation from the Civic Trust. The building is designated Grade I listed.

=== St Martin Coney Street ===
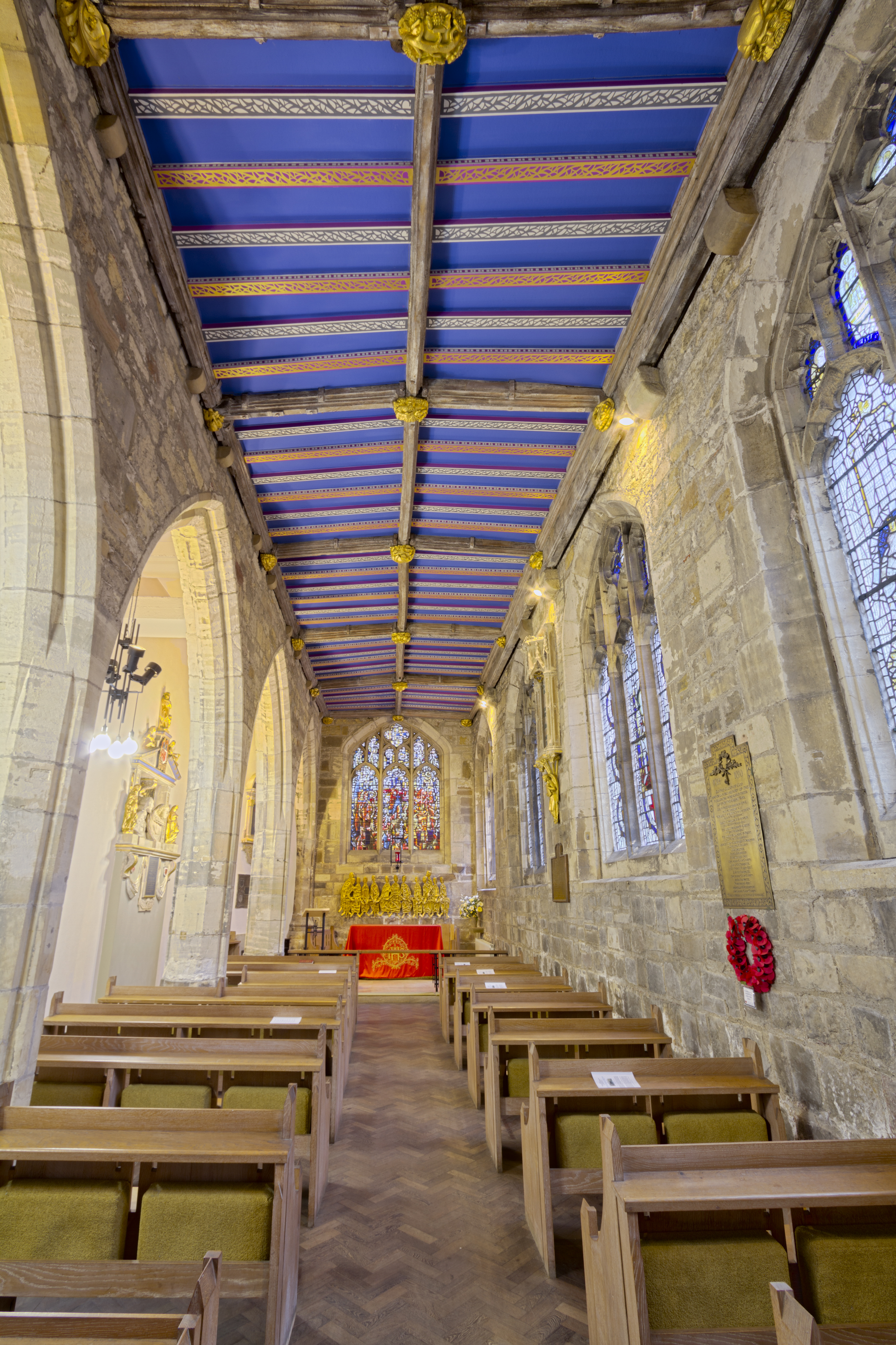
Inside St Martin's Church

Often known as St Martin le Grand, though this title was coined in the 1830s and is not the official name of the church. The earliest masonry is from c1080, though the church is thought to be older. The church was largely destroyed in a bombing raid on 29 April 1942, but the 15th-century tower and south aisle remain, with a new vestry and parish room at the west end of the site. The St Martin window of c. 1437 was removed before the raid for safety; now occupying a new transept opposite the south door, it is the largest medieval window in York outside the Minster. The church is most notable now for the restoration under the architect George Gaze Pace, completed in 1968, which is generally considered one of the most successful post-war church restorations in the country, successfully blending the surviving 15th-century remains with contemporary elements. The church is also known for the prominent clock overhanging the street, topped by the figure of a naval officer dating from 1778.

=== St Martin-cum-Gregory, Micklegate ===
Part of the nave of St Martin-cum-Gregory dates from the 13th century; the remaining building dates from the 14th and 15th centuries. This church is being developed as a stained glass centre and is an occasional arts venue.

=== St Mary Bishophill Junior ===
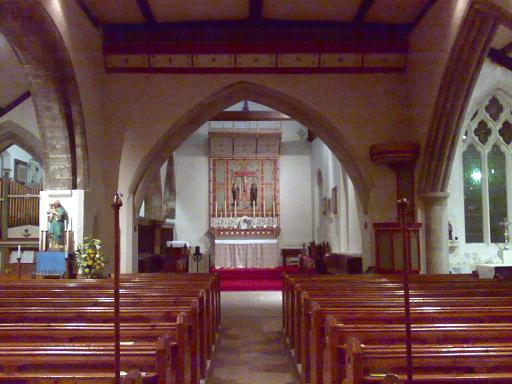
St. Mary Bishophill Junior. Easter

It is generally agreed that St Mary Bishophill Junior is the oldest surviving church within the city walls. The church is situated within what was the colonia or civil quarter of the Roman garrison of Eboracum and pieces of Roman tilework can be observed found in the Tower. The tower itself is of the late Anglo-Saxon period with masonry of very mixed materials, including blocks of brown sandstone and limestone blocks, some laid in herringbone fashion; the quoins are mainly of brown sandstone laid in a "side-alternate" fashion and with no buttresses, factors which often mark Anglo-Saxon architecture. Another typical feature is found in the double-arched belfry windows with a single round column dividing them, in this case outlined in strip-work, with the imposts on the columns projecting out from the wall. The rather plain lower section tapers slightly from base to top, with the decoration of the belfry section on each of the four sides. Inside the church is reported "the finest pre-Conquest tower arch". There are also fragments of pre-Conquest stonework inside this church. Adjacent to this site there was formerly St Mary Bishophill Senior, with early Anglo-Saxon features such as monolithic construction, on the base of a Romano-British wall which could possibly also have been a church. There is now no trace of this, although it was reported to stand as a ruin in 1961.

=== St Mary, Castlegate ===
St Mary's Castlegate is in use as an art space with changing exhibitions organised by York Museums Trust.

=== St Michael, Spurriergate ===
St Michael's, Spurriergate is run by St Michael's York Trust and is in use as a café (The Spurriergate Centre) and Christian Counselling centre. It has some important stained glass, and still has a peal of six bells which are occasionally rung.

=== St Michael-le-Belfrey, High Petergate ===
St Michael-le-Belfrey is included here for completeness, as, strictly speaking, this is not a medieval church. The original church was completely demolished and rebuilt between 1525 and 1536, and the only part of the building surviving from the old church is the fourteenth-century stained glass in the east window.

=== St Olave's, Marygate ===
St Olave's (pronounced Olive) is situated within the walls of St Mary's Abbey, which was ruined at the Dissolution. It is dedicated to Olaf, patron saint of Norway. Thought to have been founded by Earl Siward of Northumbria before the Conquest, the medieval church was restored in the 18th century. A new chancel was added in 1887–9 designed by George Fowler Jones, a York architect. This contains the five-light 15th-century east window.

=== St Sampson, Church Street ===
St Sampson's Church, on Church Street, has been adapted and is in use as a 'drop-in centre' for people who are over 60.

=== St Saviour, St Saviourgate ===
St Saviour's Church, York is now in use as a resource and teaching centre by the York Archaeological Trust. Called DIG: an archaeological adventure, it is open for visits by individuals or groups such as schools, and has changing exhibitions.

== Demolished medieval churches ==
=== All Saints, Fishergate ===
It was built in or before the eleventh century, and was located south of Paragon Street. It was given to Whitby Abbey in around 1095. After the dissolution of the monasteries, it seems to have quickly fallen into disuse, and by 1549 had disappeared.

=== All Saints (in the Marsh), Peasholme Green ===
Disused and partly demolished in 1586, although some remains are still visible on the map of York which is part of John Speed's map of Yorkshire of 1610, including York as the county town. It was adjacent to the Black Swan inn, which still exists. The church is being excavated by York Archaeological Trust (June 2012) as an extension to their five-year excavation of the adjacent Hungate dig. Dozens of children's and adult graves were located, covering some 400 years.

=== Holy Trinity (also known as Christ Church), King's Square ===
Largely rebuilt in the nineteenth century, closed in 1886 and fell into disuse (by 1896 it housed a small flock of sheep). It was demolished in 1937, but some of the gravestones from its churchyard can be seen in King's Square near the top of the Shambles, and at the Petergate end of the Square is a large inscribed paving stone commemorating the church.

=== St Andrew, Fishergate ===
Between Fishergate and the River Foss, the church was taken over in approximately 1195 by a Gilbertine Priory which was dissolved in 1538.

=== St Benet ===
The church, on the corner of Swinegate and Back Swinegate, was built before 1154 and demolished around 1300.

=== St Clement, Clementhorpe ===
It possibly dated back to pre-Conquest times, then became part of a 12th-century Benedictine nunnery which was closed in 1536. The church itself closed in 1547, but some ruins were still to be seen when Francis Drake published Eboracum. A new St Clement's Church was eventually built in Scarcroft Road in 1872–4.

=== St Edward the Martyr, Lawrence Street ===
This church (also known as St Edward the Martyr, Walmgate-Bar-Without) was built before 1213 but fell into decay in the sixteenth century. It was situated on the north side of Lawrence Street, near what is now Lansdowne Terrace. Over the years, construction workers in the area have uncovered burials under what was once the churchyard.

=== St George, Fishergate ===
This church was suppressed in the sixteenth century and ruinous by 1644. Its churchyard (with the supposed gravestone of Dick Turpin) survives, and across the road (now George Street) is the Roman Catholic Church of St George, built to serve the Irish community that settled in the Walmgate area after the Great Famine.

=== St Giles, Gillygate ===
St Giles, the church of the Skinners Guild, was situated at the north end of Gillygate, on the west side of the road near where The Salvation Army building is now. The first known mention of it was in the twelfth century. In 1586, the parish was amalgamated with that of St Olave, but when it was demolished is not known. The churchyard was still in use for the burial of plague victims in 1605, and it is possible that executed criminals were also buried there until 1693.

=== St Gregory, Barker Lane ===
This was a small church, located on the east side of Barker Lane (previously called Gregory Lane), between Micklegate and Toft Green. It was first mentioned in the twelfth century. In around 1548, the church of St Martin on Micklegate was scheduled for closure, but an agreement between Alderman John Beane and the Corporation resulted in the refurbishment of St Martin, the uniting of its parish with that of St Gregory and the demolition of the latter. The combined parish was designated as St Martin-cum-Gregory in 1586.

=== St Helen, Fishergate ===
St Helen, located in what is now Winterscale Street, east of Fishergate, was granted to Holy Trinity Priory by Ralph Paganel in 1086. The church fell into disuse in the late fifteenth century, and the parish was amalgamated with that of St Lawrence in 1586. Drake, in Eboracum (1736), noted that stone coffins had been recently discovered on the site where the church once stood.

=== St Helen-on-the-Walls, Aldwark ===
This church was located on or near the east corner of York's Roman walls. Its site was excavated by the York Archaeological Trust in the 1970s, and a number of phases of building or rebuilding were identified. The original church was a small rectangular building, with stone walls that included re-used Roman stones. It seems to have been built in the late 9th or early 10th century. There were four later building phases: a small chancel was added (probably in the 12th century), the chancel was lengthened and the nave walls rebuilt (possibly early fourteenth century), the whole church was rebuilt to make it wider, though the length was the same as the older building (around 1400), and finally, around 1500, the nave was lengthened and the north wall probably rebuilt. In 1549, the parish was added to that of St Cuthbert and the church started to decay. Some remains were still standing in 1580.

=== St John-del-Pyke, Ogleforth ===
The church's name relates to the adjacent turnpike (now Chapter House Street) that leads to York Minster Yard. It was situated on the north-east side of Ogleforth and was built before 1160. It was enlarged in the fifteenth century but, along with the churchyard and rectory, it was sold to Archbishop Holgate in 1553, probably becoming part of the nearby Archbishop Holgate's School, and the parish was then united with that of Holy Trinity, Goodramgate.

=== St John, Hungate ===
Known as St John the Baptist or St John's-in-the-Marsh. Demolished c.1550s. Much of the area was excavated by York Archaeological Trust in its Hungate dig, 2006–2013. The foundations were partly uncovered and its location established as part of that project in 2013.

=== St Mary ad Valvas ===
A small church at the east end of the Minster, described in 1332 as 'near the gate of St. Peter's Church'. Demolished between 1362 and 1376. No standing remains survive

=== St Mary, Bishophill Senior ===
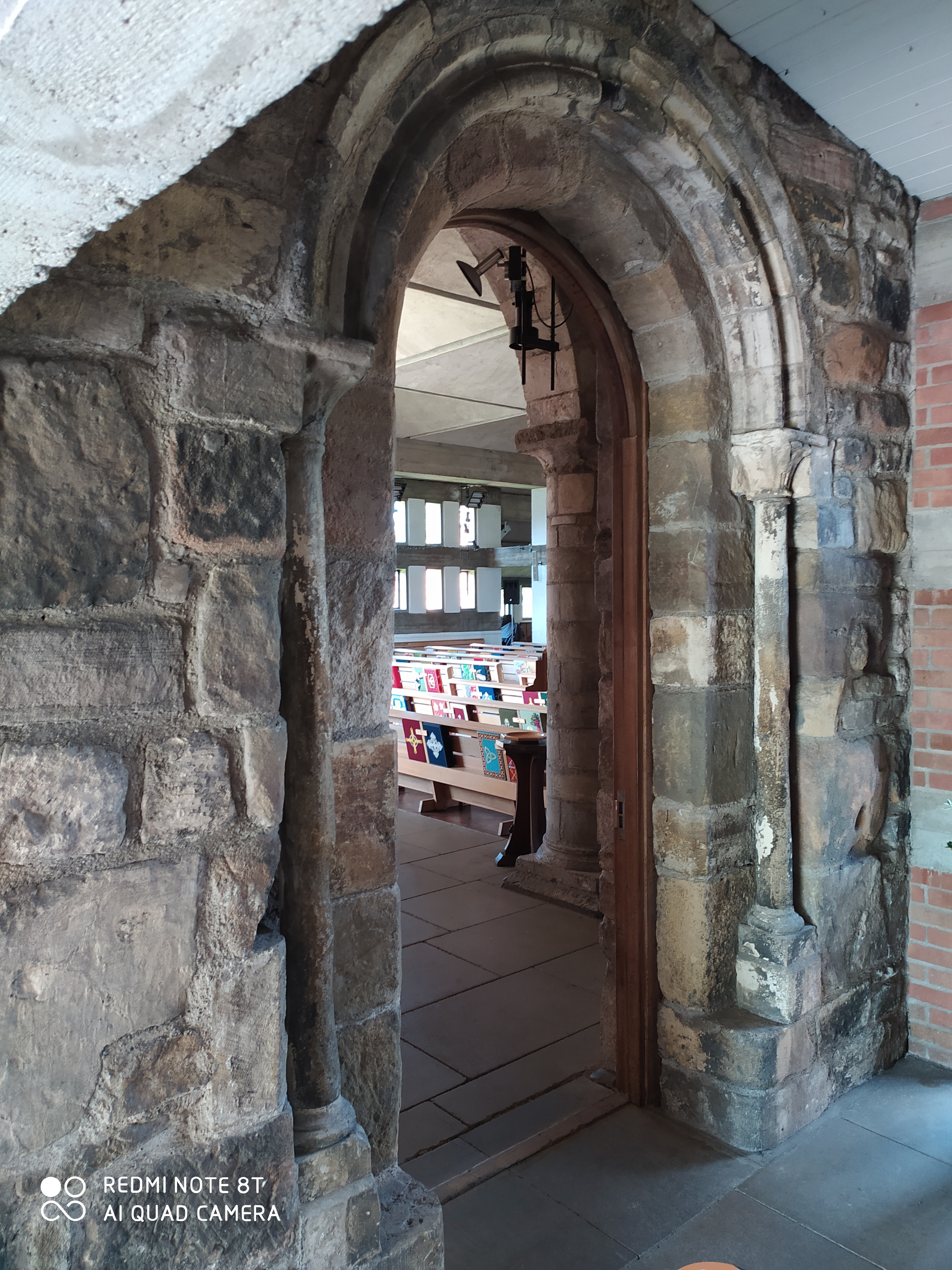
Doorway of St Mary, Bishophill Senior, now at Holy Redeemer Church, York in Boroughbridge Road

The mediaeval church in the Bishophill area was restored in 1866 by J. B. and W. Atkinson, but was derelict by the mid-20th century. Although listed at Grade I, it was demolished in 1963.

=== St Mary, Layerthorpe ===
First clear reference to this church is in 1331, though circumstantial evidence exists in a priest of 'Leirthorp' being witness to a charter in 1184–9. Closed in 1549 and parish united with St. Cuthbert, Peaseholme Green in 1586.

=== St Mary, Lounelithgate ===
This church is known only from a document of 1203, with Robert Vavasour as a patron. Lounelithgate is now known as Victor Street.

=== St Maurice, Monkgate ===
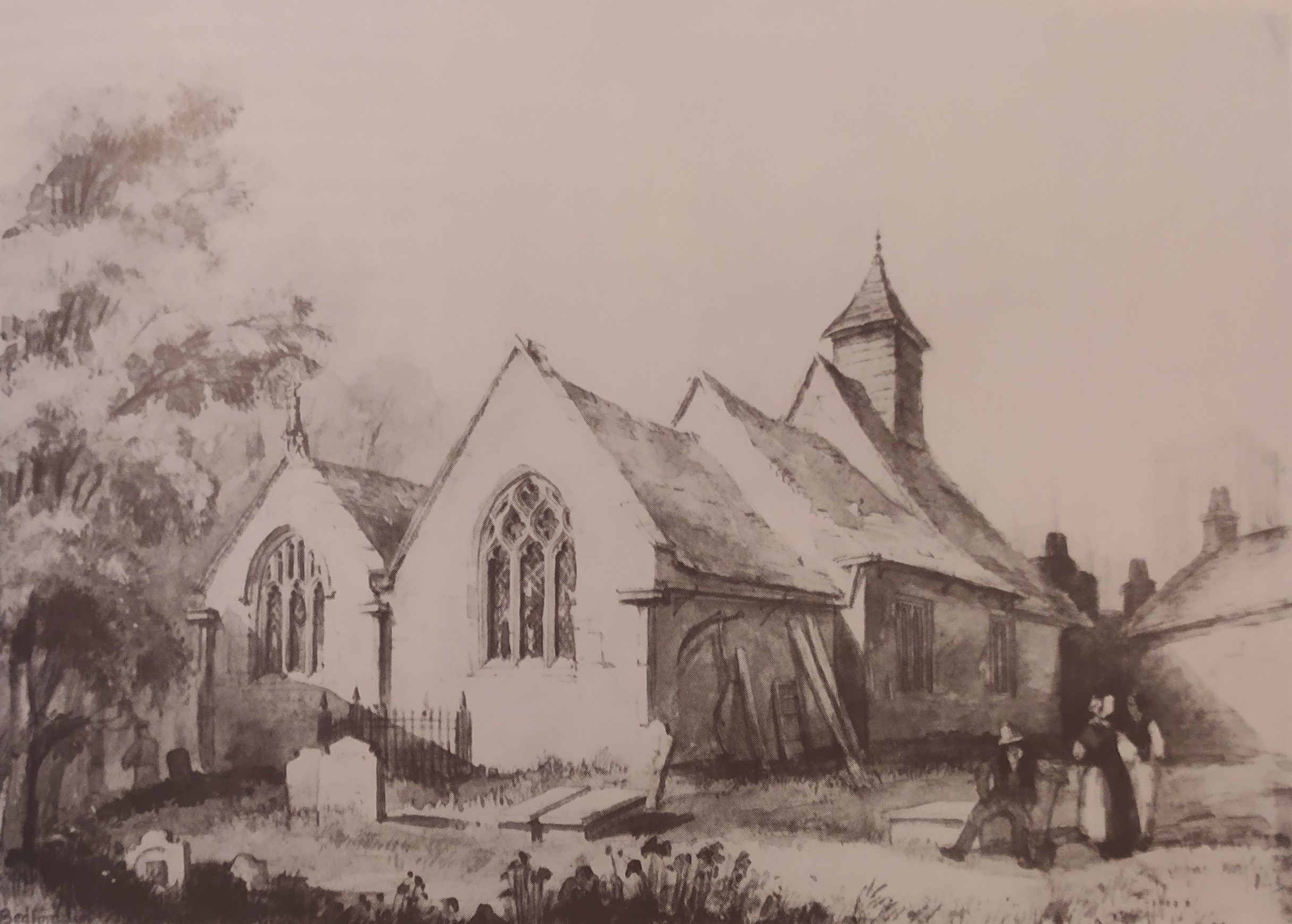
The Mediaeval church of St Maurice

Demolished in 1876 and replaced by a new church, which itself was demolished in 1966. Some of its graveyard is still to be seen on the corner of Lord Mayor's Walk.

=== St Michael, Walmgate-Bar-Without ===
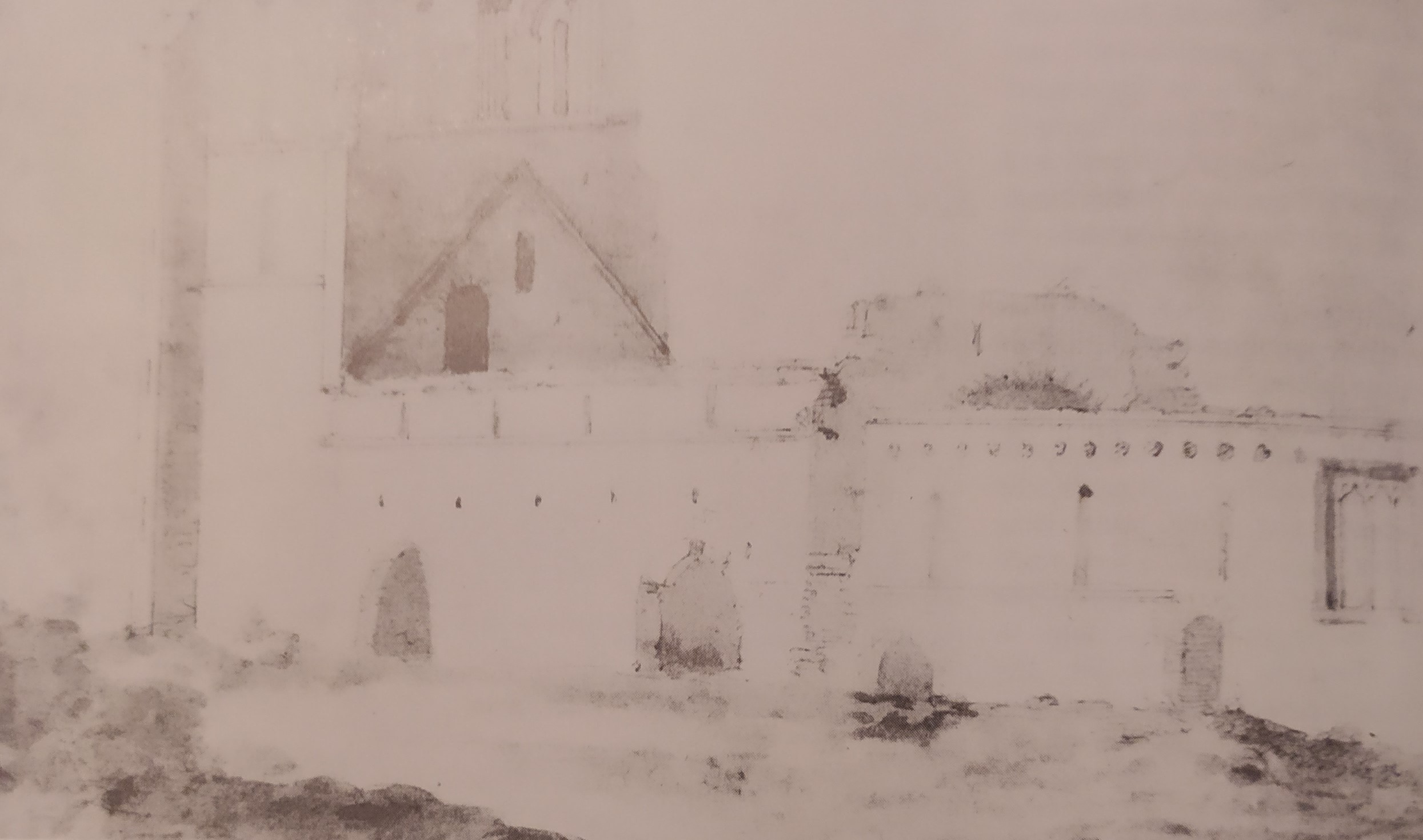
The ruins of St Michael, in about 1700

Existing by 1277 and united with St. Lawrence, Walmgate-Bar-Without in 1365. No standing remains.

=== St Nicholas, Lawrence Street ===
Part of the twelfth-century St Nicholas's Hospital, founded in 1142. Few references to the church survive, apart from a single bequest of a hive of bees, until it was used during the 1644 Siege of York during the English Civil War, when it was severely damaged by the Parliamentary forces' cannon fire from the city walls. The steeple and south wall were still standing in 1730, but other parts of the building were re-used or stolen; Lord Fairfax arranged for its Norman doorway to be re-erected at St Margaret, Walmgate. St Nicholas Fields is an old brickworks and landfill site which now has the St Nicholas Fields Environment Centre situated on it. The nature reserve has a modern stone circle which has used some of the stones from the church.

=== St Nicholas, Micklegate ===
St Nicholas adjoined Holy Trinity Priory but had its own parish. Its tower was rebuilt in the 1450s with funds from the priory, as the parishioners could not afford its repair. However, the church was demolished before 1550.

=== St Peter-le-Willows, Walmgate ===
South of Walmgate, near Walmgate Bar and first mentioned in 1279. Excavations in 1827 and 1945 uncovered wall footings and a graveyard.

=== St Peter-the-Little, Peter Lane ===
In 1548 it was proposed that the parish should be united with that of All Saints, Pavement, and in the following year the church and churchyard were sold to Miles Newton of York, who in his will dated 10 June 1550, bequeathed to his son "the church ground, churchyarde and walls of the late dissolved church called Peterlayne lyttil in York". Meanwhile, neither the parishioners of St Peter's nor those of All Saints would accept the union of the parishes until in 1583 they finally agreed to a decision to that effect of the Ecclesiastical Commissioners, and the church was officially suppressed in 1586.

=== St Stephen, Fishergate ===
The church originally stood near the end of Picadilly but no visible remains survive. First referenced in 1093-4 under William II, but it was annexed to St. Martin-le-Grand, Coney Street by 1331.

=== St Wilfrid, Blake Street ===
The church was suppressed in 1585. The dedication was restored in 1760 for a Catholic chapel on a different site, and in 1802 this was rebuilt on the site in Duncombe Place where the present Oratory church of Saint Wilfrid eventually replaced it in 1862–4.

== See also ==
- Grade I listed buildings in North Yorkshire
- Grade I listed churches in the East Riding of Yorkshire and the City of York
- Grade II* listed buildings in the City of York
- List of churches preserved by the Churches Conservation Trust in Northern England
- List of English abbeys, priories and friaries serving as parish churches
