= Dallara (disambiguation) =

Dallara or Dallara Automobili is an Italian chassis manufacturer for various motor racing series.

Dallara or Dall'Ara may also refer to:

- Stadio Renato Dall'Ara, a stadium in Bologna, Italy

== People with the surname ==
- Charles Dallara, American banker
- Giampaolo Dallara (born 1936), Italian businessman and motorsports engineer, owner of Dallara Automobili above
- Tony Dallara (1936–2026), stage name of Antonio Lardera, Italian singer, actor and television personality

== See also ==
- Ara (disambiguation)
- Dall (disambiguation)
- Dalla (disambiguation)
