= Elmfield College =

School in Heworth, York, England

Coordinates: 53.974°N 1.059°W

Elmfield College, York (1864–1932), originally called Connexional College or Jubilee College (or School) in honour of the Primitive Methodist Silver Jubilee in 1860, was a Primitive Methodist college on the outskirts of Heworth, York, England, near Monk Stray.

== Primitive Methodism in York ==
The college was a national venture, but tied in well with local developments. Key participants were Colin M'Kechnie, William Antliff, and Samuel Antliff.

William Clowes, the Primitive Methodist evangelist, first preached in York in May 1819. On this occasion, when he held his meeting in Pavement, 'the people drew up in considerable numbers'. Clowes announced that he would preach again in a fortnight's time but in fact his second visit was not made until some six weeks later when he preached in either St Sampson's Square or Pavement. As a result of these visits and with the encouragement of the 'friends' at Elvington, which was 'the base for the mission to York', a society of seven members was formed in 1819. This small society rented accommodation in Peasholme Green and was visited by itinerant preachers and by local preachers from Hull and Ripon.

The society remained in these premises for less than a year and in 1820 moved to Grape Lane Chapel which had been unoccupied for some time. This was rented for £20 a year and opened for worship on 2 July of that year. The society was at this time part of the Hull Circuit and regular services were held by ministers from that city and by lay preachers from the neighbourhood of York. The York branch expanded and in 1822 was formed into a separate circuit which included 32 preaching places in the surrounding villages. There was a resident minister and the circuit membership is said to have been 400. It has been suggested, however, that the York society was not then ready for independent status and that it at first met some difficulties. In addition the society suffered from local and apparently purposeless hooliganism. Complaint was made to the magistrates and the chapel was visited by the lord mayor and two cases were brought to the York sessions but the disturbances continued for almost two years.

The chapel was bought outright by the trustees in 1829 for £450, and a cottage converted for a caretaker. About 1821 a Sunday school was opened and accommodated in a room under the gallery which was separated from the chapel by sliding doors. The chapel is described in 1834 as accommodating 684 persons. Between 1836 and 1850 membership increased from 90 to 159 persons. Grape Lane Chapel was vacated in 1851 and later became a warehouse and furniture store; in 1956 it was derelict.

== pre-1860 ==
Elmfield House was built c.1832. It appears in the 1841, 1851 and 1861 censuses (and then from 1871 as the college). People who lived in the house prior to the foundation of the college included the musician Frederick Hill and the solicitor William Singleton (1809-1860).

== 1860s ==
The school opened in 1864 after much work by Samuel Antliff. John Petty was the first Governor, and James Kyle Dall the first Headmaster.

In 1865 the college had 92 boarders, 8 day pupils, and a staff of 6, with 3 part-time assistants. The average boarders' fee was £31. The school was enlarged in that year and 15 students for the ministry were admitted.

"In the valleys of the Allen mighty seasons of power from on high have been experienced from the days of Batty, Garner, Flesher, and Harland onwards. Such was the case in a marked degree in 1825, in 1831-2, in 1844, in 1852-3, in 1859-60, and so forth. Catton was baptised in a marvellous manner in 1831. During the next year at Keenley many were converted, Joseph Ritson among the number; his sweetheart, Jane Clemitson, and seven months afterwards she became his wife; and his companion, “Neddy” Henderson, who served Allendale and North Shields Circuits as a local preacher in after years. Joseph Ritson was subsequently the leading figure in Primitive Methodism in West Allen, and he gave to the Connexion one of its foremost ministers of the present time. Joseph commenced business at Ninebanks as builder and joiner, built up a prosperous trade, and was known and trusted all round as a man of character and probity. Frank, manly, free from cant, inclined to sternness and severity, yet having the heart of a child, his worldly success never cooled his devotion in the Lord’s service, and a revival was his joy. His house was the home of the preachers, and his attachment to them was very close. On a Sunday in July, 1878, he attended services at Corry Hill conducted by his son — the present editor — prayed with much fervour in the prayer meeting, and within a fortnight “passed on.” His eldest son Thomas is a local preacher in the Haltwhistle circult; John, the second son, was a class-leader at Ninebanks when he died some years ago; Ann, the second daughter, deeply spiritual, morally beautiful, cultured even, remarkable in many ways, became the devoted wife of Robert Clemitson, but was taken away in the fulness of her powers; Joseph, the youngest born, far and away the chiefest of them all, who, when a boy dedicated his life to the Lord, was made a local preacher at sixteen, when he returned home from Elmfield College, at seventeen returned to Elmfield as a teacher, at twenty went as a master to Woodhouse Grove, the Wesleyan school for ministers’ sons, simultaneously received invitations from both Connexions to become a minister, entered the Primitive Methodist itinerancy, used untiringly his versatile gifts of mind and soul by speech and pen in some of the leading circuits in the Connexion, administrator and evangelist, pastor and social reformer, preacher and politician, controversialist and novelist, and now Connexional Editor, influencing very many thousands of minds, and displaying an aptitude for the office which has brought to him commendations from the entire community."

From Northern Primitive Methodism; W.M. Paterson, E. Dalton, London (1909), pp. 171–183

== 1880s ==
With regard to Elmfield College, Dr Kenneth Lysons, in his book ‘’A Little Primitive’’ (Church in the Market Place Publications, Buxton, 2001), quoting the Primitive Methodist World for 17 May 1883 says: "The College was the outcome of the strong conviction that if the [Primitive Methodist] Connexion did not provide thorough and liberal education for the sons of our ministers and prosperous laymen, we should not retain them in communion with us. The blessing of God upon the industry and economy of our people has raised many of them into comfortable circumstamces, and enabled them to provide somewhat liberally for the education of their sons."

W.H.Balgarnie, the prototype for Mr Chips, studied and taught at Elmfield. Almost immediately thereafter, he was elected to the committee of the Old Boys Club and began writing articles and poems for the school magazine, some of them extolling "Elmfield, famed as Learning's blest abode, And situated on the Malton Road"

== 1890s ==
Bulmer's History and Directory of North Yorkshire (1890) described the college as " a large handsome building in this township (Heworth), pleasantly situated on the Malton road, just outside the city boundary. It is the property of the trustees of the Primitive New Connexion, and was erected in 1864, at a cost of £10,000. There is accommodation for 106 boys. The school-room, classrooms, dormitories, &c., are lofty and well lighted. The curriculum of studies includes all the subjects embraced in a high-class education."

Charles Baldwin Ferguson (b. Birmingham, 22 August 1875) B.A. Manchester (2nd class History), 1896; M.A., 1899, was at Elmfield 1899–1901. Then Assistant Master, Richmond Hill School, London, S.W.. 1896–1897. Second and House Master, Shebbear College, North Devon, 1897–1899. Now at Government School in Orange River Colony.

== 1900s ==
There were 61 boys enrolled in 1905. In the following year the school was closed by the trustees for the Connexion, because of financial difficulties, but was reopened in 1907 owned by a company formed by the old boys. A laboratory, workshop, and classroom costing £1,500 were added in 1909.

Of John Heath, Fond du Lac County, Wisconsin, Past and Present tells us that ‘John was reared in England, largely spending his boyhood and youth in Crewe, to which place his parents removed during his early childhood. His education, however, was obtained in Over, where he was born, and attended a private school.’ Thomas Henry's obituary in The Crewe & Nantwich Chronicle for 7 July 1900, says: ‘He had a liberal education, having attended Elmfield College, York.’ Samuel was clearly determined that at least two of his sons should have a better schooling than he had received.

== 1910s ==
Elmfield was transformed by the Great War. Indeed, its Golden Jubilee celebrations took place at Whit, just 4 weeks before the murder of the Archduke in Sarajevo. (See John Bibby's (2015) "From Golden Jubilee to the Armistice: Elmfield College from 'The Elmfieldian', 1914:1919".)

== 1920s ==
In 1928 Elmfield was taken over by the Wesleyan Methodist Secondary Schools Trust, with H.B. Workman playing a leading role.

Edwin Ridsdale Tate was asked to prepare sketches of educational institutions in York, including Elmfield.

== 1930s ==
There were over 100 boys, half of whom were boarders, enrolled in 1932, when the school was closed and merged with Ashville College. The buildings were subsequently demolished.

== 1940s and after ==
All that is left of the college now is numbers 1 (the former "Elm Field Villa"), and 9 Straylands Grove, next to Monk Stray, and a row of masters' houses along Elmfield Terrace (as far as the first bend). Domestic staff housing may have been down in Willow Grove, off Elmfield Terrace, although these terraced cottages predate the masters' housing and are associated with a large house, Eden Place, that occupied the Elmfield Terrace frontage onto Monk Stray until at least World War I. No 1 Willow Grove was the Tuck Shop. No 5 Willow Grove is larger than the other houses on this row and included the music school.

The present No. 9 Straylands Grove was built in the 1920s as the headmaster's house. (The owners have recently renamed the house to reflect this fact).

Number 1 used to have, in its garden, a very basic swimming pool of peculiar (triangular?) shape. Whether the head master allowed access to it by the pupils is unrecorded. Since closure of the college, the house has been an art gallery and a family home.

Elmfield Terrace and Willow Grove remained privately maintained streets until the 1950s when they were adopted by York City Council. Until this time, Elmfield Terrace was almost completely separated from Straylands Grove by a 6-foot wall (parallel to Straylands) with signs of the gate that must have existed to maintain its private status.

The area now covered by numbers 3-7 Straylands Grove, along with much of the surrounding land which was once belonged to the college, has now been built on.

== Headmasters and Governors ==
Initially the Headmaster was responsible for the teaching in the school, while the Governor was responsible for everything else, including the boys' moral welfare.

=== Governors ===
- 1864-1868: Rev John Petty (image and biography at ): in 1857 Petty undertook a history of the Connexion to be published to mark its Golden Jubilee in 1860. Between 1857 and 1863 he worked in Hull before the Connexion honoured Petty by asking him to assume the Governorship of Elmfield. (At one stage the new college was to have been based in Hull.) The following year it was decided to accept into Elmfield a number of young ministerial candidates and Petty added to his duties those of theological tutor.
- 1868-1879: Rev Thomas Smith (1814-1879) (image and biography at )
- 1879-1889: Rev Robert Smith (1815-1897) (image and biography at )
- 1889-1890: Rev Robert Harrison (1841-1927 (image and biography at )
- 1890-1896: Rev George Seaman (1839-1908)(image and biography at )
- 1896-1901: Rev John Gair
- 1901-1904: Rev William Edward Crombie, who married Emily Judith, the daughter of Samuel Antliff
- 1904-1906: Rev George F Fawcett (1875-1934)

After 1906 the management was changed so the Headmaster took on the Governor's responsibilities.

=== Headmasters ===
- 1864-1871: James Kyle Dall, LLD
- 1871-1878: William J Russell
- 1878-1879: John Marsden Raby, BA, BSC, LL.D. left Woodhouse Grove in 1875 to become Head Master of Elmfield College, York. Raby, went as a scholar to Woodhouse Grove in 1835, and remained there till 1843, being granted an ... He then became head master of Elmfield College, York; and in 1880 became the principal of Epworth College, Rhyl
- 1879-1886: Thomas Gough, BA, BSc. A graduate of London University (1st Class Hons. in Biology, 2nd Class Hons. in Geology). Subsequently, headmaster of King Edward VI School, Retford, Notts., 1886–1919. Born c1854 at Staunton on Arrow, Herefordshire; son of Thomas Gough, builder. Ordained priest in the Church of England, diocese of Southwell, 1889.
- 1886-1891: William Johnson, BA, BSc
- 1892-1906: Rowland George Heys (see above)
- 1907-1929: Stanley Radcliffe Slack (1870- ) was educated in Birmingham at private school and at Mason's Science College. He was Sheriff of York 1924-25 and Headmaster of Elmfield College from 1907 to 1929. He chaired the York and District Football Association for almost 30 years.
- 1929–1932: Herbert Douglas Anthony, MA (Cantab), BSc, PhD - graduate of Queens' College, Cambridge and author of a book on Isaac Newton

== Elmfield College Archives ==
The Elmfield College Archives are currently housed at www.aa42.com and at Ashville College, Harrogate, the college with which Elmfield merged in 1931.
