= Dala =

Dala may refer to:

== Places ==
- Dala Airport, Dalarna province, Sweden
- Dala, Angola
- Dala, Bhutan
- Dala, Kano, Nigeria
  - Dalla Hill, a hill in Kano, Nigeria
- Đala, Serbia
- Dalas, Khuzestan Province, Iran
- Dala Township, Yangon, Myanmar

== People ==
- Alfredo Junqueira Dala, Angolan politician
- Binnya Dala (disambiguation), several people
- Jacinto Muondo Dala (born 1996), Angolan footballer
- Junior Dala (born 1989), South African cricketer
- Nanyak Dala (born 1984), Canadian rugby union player
- Peter Dala, Canadian conductor

== Other uses ==
- Dala (band), a Canadian music duo
- Dala (game), a board game from Sudan
- Dala horse, traditional Swedish wooden horse statuettes
- Dala-fur sheep, a Swedish breed of sheep
- The Hawaiian dollar, which was in circulation between 1847 and 1898
- Dala Line, a single-track railway line in Sweden
- Dala (crustacean), a Cambrian crustacean from Sweden

== See also ==
- Betpak-Dala, a region in Kazakhstan
- Dala-Floda, Dalarna County, Sweden
- Dala dala, minibus share taxis in Tanzania
- Hagryd-Dala, Halland County, Sweden
