= Dall =

Dall may refer to:

== People ==
- Anders Bendssøn Dall (died 1607), Danish Lutheran bishop
- Bobby Dall (born 1963), American musician
- Caroline Healey Dall (1822–1912), American feminist writer
- Clarrie Dall (1887–1953), Australian footballer
- Curtis Bean Dall (1896–1991), American businessman and author
- Cynthia Dall (1971–2012), American musician
- Evelyn Dall (1918–2010), American singer and actress
- Ferdomhnach Dall (died 1110), Lector of Kildare and harpist
- James Kyle Dall, first headmaster of Elmfield College
- John Dall (1920–1971), American actor
- Horace Dall (1901-1986), British amateur astronomer and telescope maker
- Karl Dall (1941–2020), German television presenter
- Nicholas Thomas Dall (died 1777), Danish painter
- Niels Dall (born 1984), Danish archer
- Rose Datoc Dall (born 1968), Filipina-American artist
- William Healey Dall (1845–1927), American naturalist and malacologist
- Dall Fields (1889–1956), American bassoonist, composer, and music educator

== Places ==
- Dall Island, an island in the Alexander Archipelago
- Dall Lake, a lake in Alaska, United States
- Dall River Old Growth Provincial Park, a park in British Columbia, Canada

== Other ==
- Dall sheep, a wild sheep of North America
- Dall's porpoise, a species of porpoise
- Dallara, an automobile chassis manufacturer
- DALL, an acronym for Devine All Love and Live, a 2024 album by Artms
- Dall., legal citation abbreviation for Alexander J. Dallas (statesman) in U.S. Supreme Court reports
