= Dalla (disambiguation) =

Dalla is a band specialising in traditional Cornish music

Dalla may also refer to:

- The former name of Dala Township, Myanmar
- Dalla (skipper), a genus of skippers in the family Hesperiidae
- Dalla Hill, Nigeria
- Dalla people, indigenous Australian people from southern Queensland
- Lucio Dalla (1943–2012), an Italian singer-songwriter and musician
- Hadron Dalla, a character in the Paratime series
- "Dalla Dalla", a 2019 song by Itzy

== See also ==
- Dala (disambiguation)
- Dallah (disambiguation)
