= St Sampson's Church, York =

Listed church in York, England

St Sampson's Church
- St Sampson's Church, seen from Church Street

- Location within North Yorkshire
- 53°57′35″N 1°04′53″W
- OS grid reference: SE 60386 51911
- Location: Church street, York
- Country: England
- Denomination: Church of England
- Previous denomination: Roman Catholic
- Website: stsampsonscentre.co.uk

History
- Former name(s): Church of St Sampson, Girdlergate
- Status: Parish church

Architecture
- Functional status: Community centre
- Heritage designation: Grade II listed
- Designated: 14 June 1954
- Architect: Frederick Bell
- Architectural type: Parish church
- Style: Gothic
- Years built: 1845–1848
- Groundbreaking: Early 12th century
- Completed: 1480s
- Closed: 1969

St Sampson's Church is a former parish church in the city centre of York, England. It stands on Church Street, near St Sampson's Square.

The church sits across the line of the wall of Roman Eboracum, and the first church on the site was probably built before the Norman Conquest, as a fragment of an early 11th-century cross has been found in the wall of a house on Newgate, within the former churchyard. Foundations of a Norman wall have also been discovered underneath the present church. The church was first recorded in 1154, and from 1394 the advowson belonged to the Vicars Choral of York Minster. It is dedicated to Saint Sampson of York, the only church in England with this dedication.

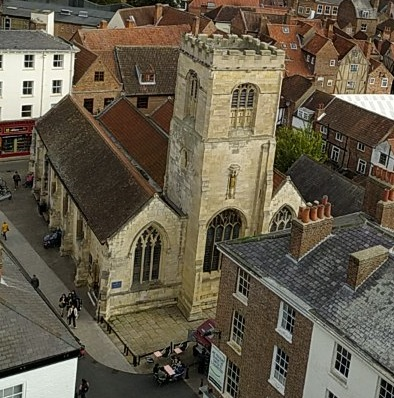
Aerial view of the church, from St Sampson's Square

The church was gradually rebuilt in the 15th century, the south aisle being rebuilt in the 1400s, and the north aisle dating in the 1440s, while the west tower was rebuilt in the 1480s. In the 1549, there was a plan to merge the parish with that of St Helen, Stonegate, and although this did not happen, St Sampson's did gain two bells from St Helen's. In 1644, the tower was damaged during the English Civil War, and the Parliamentarian troops subsequently destroyed most of the monuments in the church.

Between 1845 and 1848, most of the church was rebuilt by Frederick Bell but kept with the Gothic style, and a vestry was added. Because of this work, the church is considered to be more Victorian in construction than medieval. The tower survived, but was reduced in height, being heightened again in 1910. Other pre-Victorian elements of the church include the east window of the north aisle, some roof bosses, the bell-frame and bells, the north and south doors, the piscina, and various monuments. In 1969, the church closed, and many of its fittings were removed. However, it was restored by George Pace, and in 1974 it reopened as a centre for the elderly. He inserted a mezzanine floor over the north aisle, to give space for offices, and placed a kitchen in the south aisle. The sanctuary was converted into a chapel, with a reredos from All Saints, Falsgrove.

The church was designated a Grade II listed building in June 1954.

== See also ==
- Listed buildings in York (within the city walls, northern part)
