= James Kyle Dall =

James Kyle Dall was the first headmaster of Elmfield College, Heworth, York (Booth 1990:29). Born at Preston in Lancashire, the son of John Dall, he entered Trinity College Dublin in October 1845 at the age of 21, and graduated BA in 1850. He had been a schoolmaster in Leeds before moving to Elmfield, where he worked closely with John Petty, its first Governor.
