= Church Street (York) =

Street in York, England

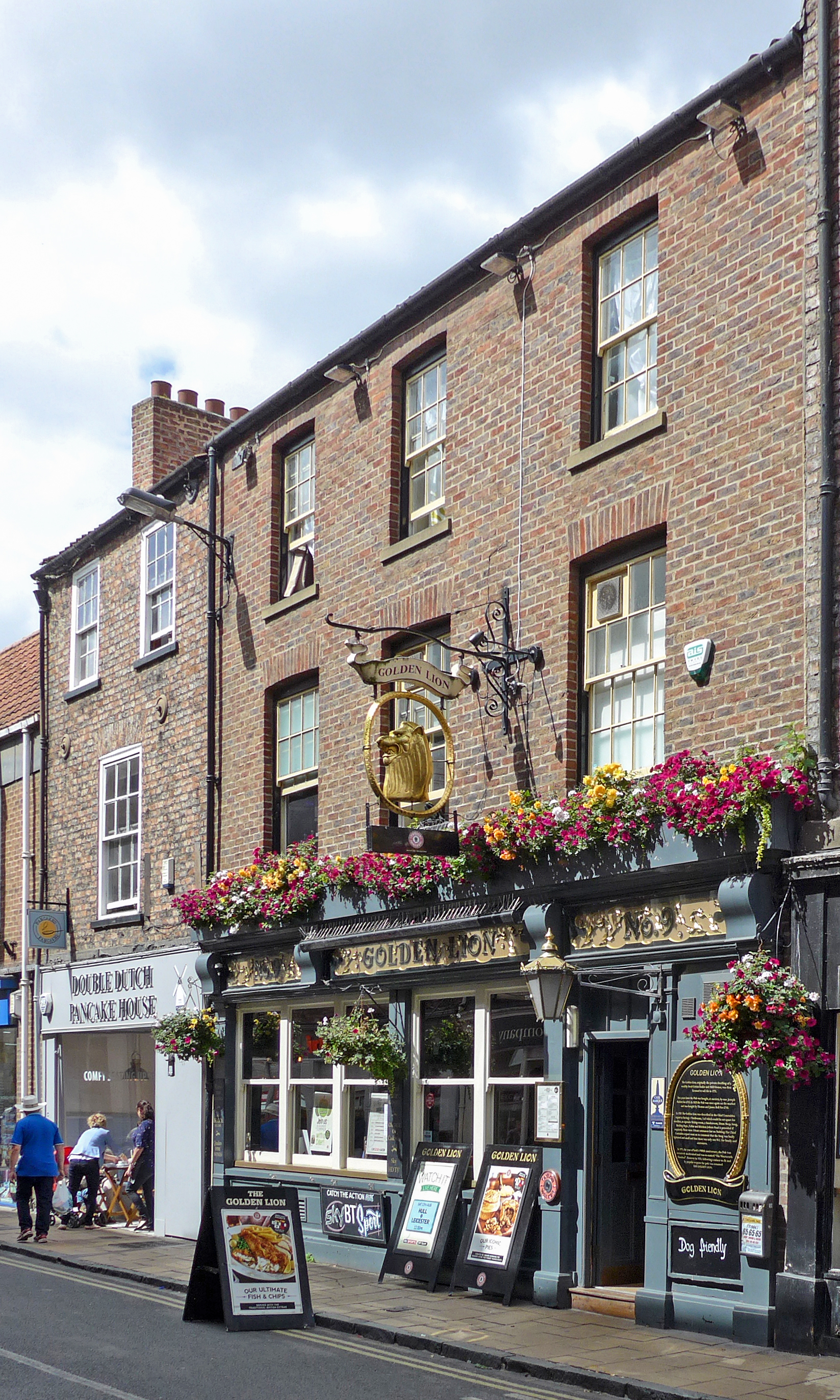
- Shops on Church Street
- Location within York
- Former name: Girdlergate
- Location: York, England
- Coordinates: 53.9599°N 1.0811°W
- North east end: King's Square
- Major junctions: Patrick Pool; Swinegate
- South west end: St Sampson's Square

Church Street is a street in the city centre of York, in England.

== History ==
The area now occupied by the street lay just inside the city walls of Roman Eboracum, and it roughly follows the line of the Intervallum street. In 1972, excavations on the street found part of the city's sewers, providing draining from the bathhouses.

The street was recorded under the name Girdlergate from the 14th-century, when it was known as a location for the manufacture of girdles. At that time, it was shorter, running only from Swinegate to Petergate. At the south-western end of the street lay the church of St Sampson, Girdlergate.

In 1835, the street was rebuilt. It was extended south-west, to reach the new St Sampson's Square and was renamed "Church Street". The street was also widened and, other than the church, all the buildings along its length were demolished and replaced over the next couple of years. All are of brick, and it is believed that some were designed by Pickersgill and Oates. The street now forms part of the city's central shopping area.

== Layout and architecture ==
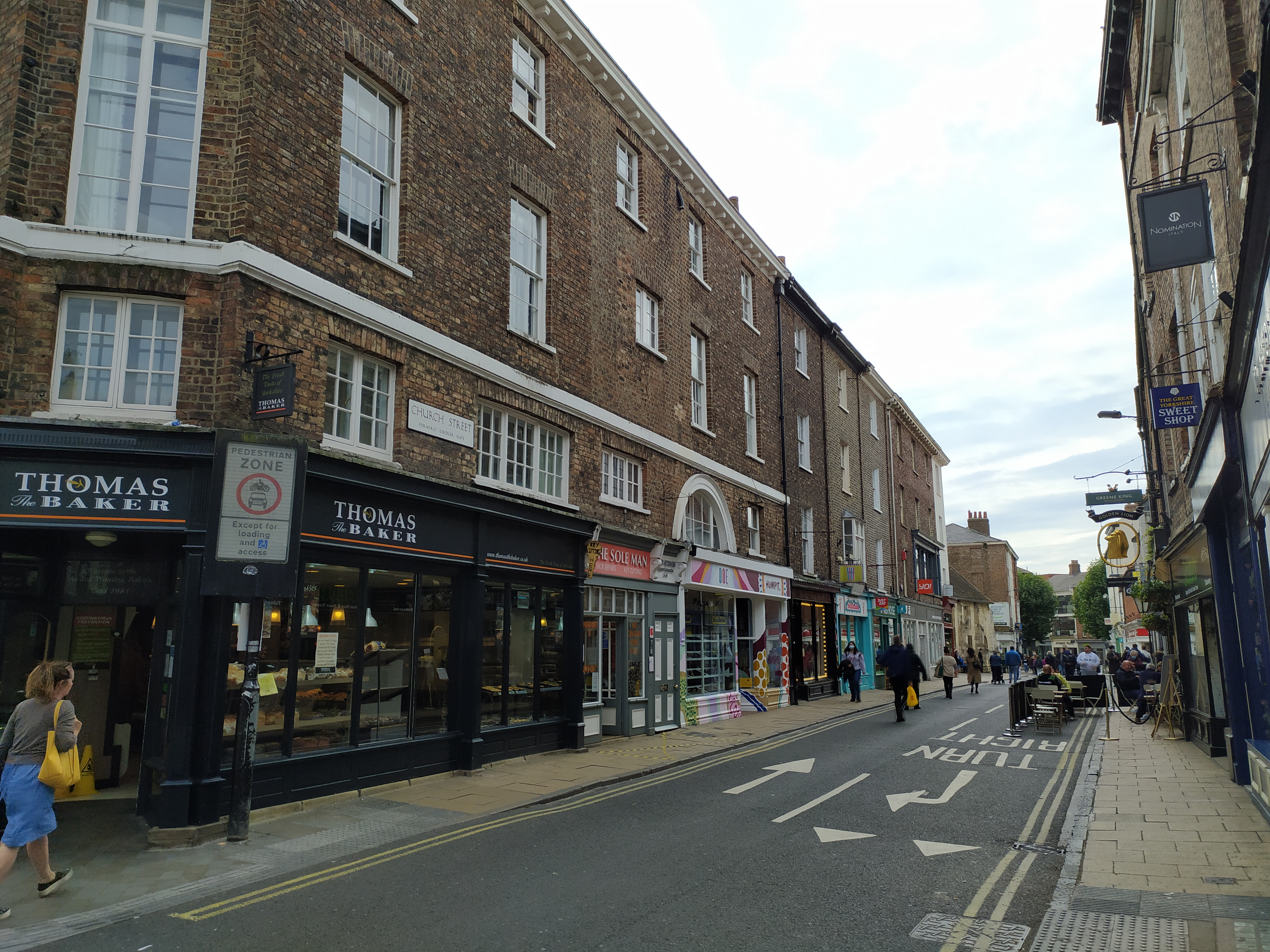
View south-west on Church Street

The street now runs north-east, from St Sampson's Square, where it meets Silver Street; to King's Square, where it meets Low Petergate and Goodramgate. Halfway along, Patrick Pool runs to the south, and Swinegate to the north.

Most of the buildings on the street date from the 1830s and are now listed buildings. On the north-west side, the listed buildings are 1A, 1, 2, 7, 10 and 11. The Golden Lion pub first received a licence in 1711, but it was rebuilt in the 1830s, and again in 1970. On the south-east side, 12 and 12A, 13, 14 and 14A, and 15–18 are all listed buildings, in addition to St Sampson's Church.
