= Herbert Douglas Anthony =

English mathematician (1892–1968)

Herbert Douglas Anthony ("H. Douglas Anthony") M.A., B.Sc., Ph.D., F.R.A.S., Lieut.-Colonel R.A.E.C., Chief Inspector of Army Education. ('b'. Fulham, 24 June 1892 – 10 June 1968) was an English mathematician, the headmaster of Elmfield College and of Kilburn Grammar School.

Anthony attended Latymer Upper School and was an open mathematics scholar at Queens' College, Cambridge. In the First World War, he served in the Loyal North Lancashire Regiment and the Royal Engineers. After the war, he became a Wesleyan minister, and taught mathematics at Richmond College (part of London University) and then Westminster College, London, which trained teachers. He became headmaster of Elmfield, near York, England, in 1929, and was later headmaster of the Kilburn Grammar School in London. After serving in the army again during the Second World War, he was promoted to Colonel and became Chief Inspector of Army Education at the War Office.

He wrote several books.

He left Elmfield in contentious circumstances - see his letter to the Yorkshire Herald (newspaper) on Saturday 2 April 1932 and reference in Elmfield archives. ["'Item 7.12: 4 April 1932: Letter to J.T.Lancaster. From (L.E.Legg)? of East Parade Chambers, Leeds.: Re Dr Anthony’s letter to the “York Herald” of the previous Saturday. Unfortunate lack of understanding between Dr Workman and Dr Anthony. The latter was not criticising the Governors of Ashville and “we cannot take exception”. Dr Anthony talked about his assistant masters preparing to do their best for the boys the next term and they would attend Ashville after the midsummer term. The writer said that the Headmaster of a Methodist school in a rather delicate position in dealing with the Headmaster of Archbishop Holgate’s Grammar School for a transfer of day boys as there is supposed to be a material difference between a school run in the interests of non-conformity and another that is part and parcel of the activities of an established church. Education matters not dealt with last week at the Union Committee because of the unfortunate accident to Dr Workman.']

== Publications ==
- Anthony, Herbert Douglas. 1927. Relativity and Religion. An Inquiry into the Implications of the Theory of Relativity with Respect to Religious Thought, Etc.
- ———. 1948. Science and Its Background. London : Macmillan & Co., Ltd., 1948. (Pp. x + 304, illustrated.)
- ———. 1961. Sir Isaac Newton. Collier.
