= Dall Lake =

Lake in the state of Alaska, United States

- Interactive map of Dall Lake
- Location: Bethel Census Area, Alaska, United States
- Coordinates: 60°21′06″N 163°40′16″W
- Basin countries: United States
- Max. length: 24 mi (39 km)
- Surface elevation: 13 feet (4.0 m)

Dall Lake is a 24-mile-long (39-kilometer) lake in the U.S. state of Alaska. It is located 70 miles (110 km) southwest of Bethel, and is named for naturalist W. H. Dall.

== Local Knowledge of Dall Lake ==
The Yupik village of Chefornak is down stream from Dall lake. The natives go to the lake to fish, hunt, pick berries, and search for fossilized bones. It is not well known for fishing, but it has been reported that a crustacean resembling a triops is found in the lake during the summer.
