= St Martin le Grand, York =

Listed church in England

St Martin le Grand
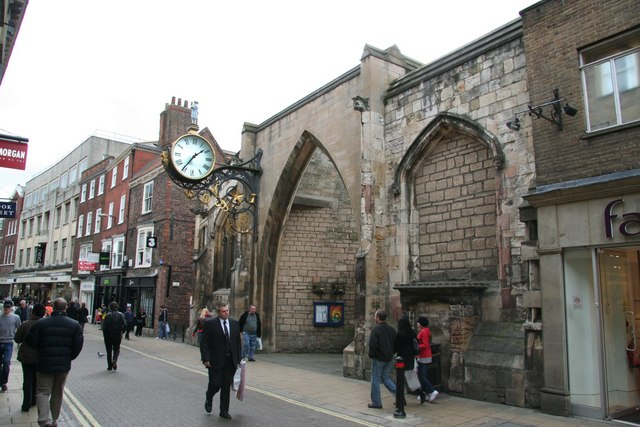
- St Martin le Grand, York
- St Martin le Grand
- 53°57′34.91″N 1°5′4.5″W
- OS grid reference: SE 60162 51856
- Location: York
- Country: England
- Denomination: Church of England
- Previous denomination: Roman Catholic
- Website: sthelenwithstmartinyork.org.uk

History
- Dedication: St Martin

Architecture
- Heritage designation: Grade II* listed

Administration
- Province: Province of York
- Diocese: Diocese of York
- Archdeaconry: York
- Deanery: York
- Parish: St Helen, Stonegate with St Martin, Coney Street

St Martin le Grand is a Grade II* listed parish church in the Church of England in York.

== History ==
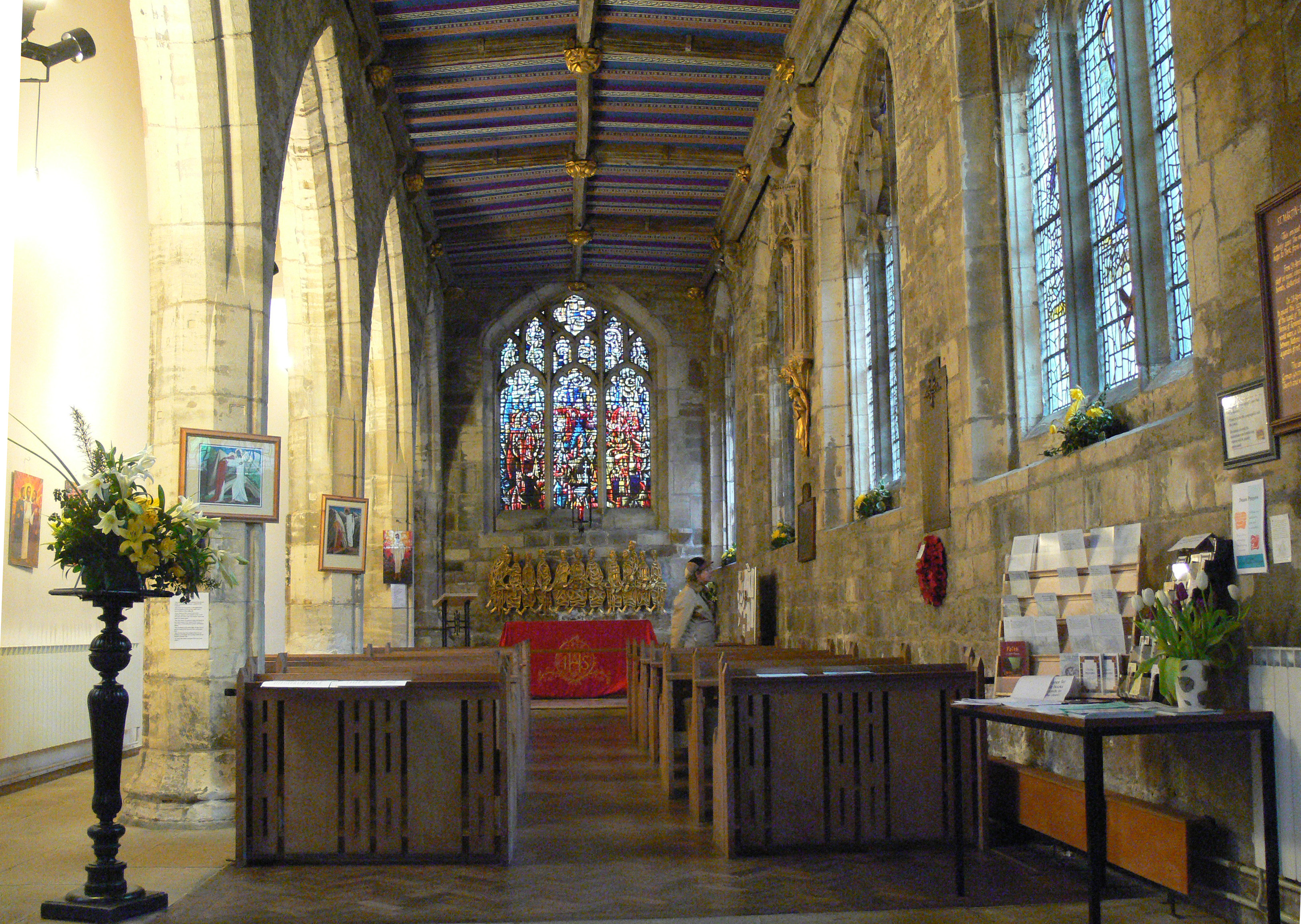
The former south aisle, now the nave

The church dates from the 11th century. The tower was built in the 15th century.

It was restored between 1853 and 1854 by J. B. and W. Atkinson of York. The south side and eastern ends of the aisles were rebuilt, and the pierced battlement was added, to replace one removed 40 years earlier. The porch was added at the east end into Coney Street, and a south porch also added near the tower. New stained glass windows by William Wailes were added.

It was badly damaged by bombing on 29 April 1942 during the so-called Baedeker Blitz. It was rebuilt between 1961 and 1968 under the supervision of George Pace.

== Clock ==
The clock on the east front was added in 1856 by Mr Cooke, with a carved figure of the 'Little Admiral' dating from 1778. It is supported by an iron bracket which originally had a gas apparatus for lighting at night.

== Stained glass and other fittings ==
The church is noted as having a large medieval window showing scenes from the life of St Martin of Tours. The 9-metre (30 ft) tall window was removed for safe keeping in 1940, and was not destroyed in the bombing of April 1942. When it returned it was set in the north wall rather than its original location in the west wall, as part of a wholesale reconstruction of the church by George Pace. As a result its monumental scale now dwarfs the size of the much reduced church.

The east window in the former south aisle, which following rebuilding functions as the nave, was designed and manufactured by Harry Stammers and installed in 1963. It commemorates the destruction of this and other churches in the bombing raid on York, the form of the red flames taking hold of the buildings, and the rising smoke above, creating an almost abstract appearance. The reredos screen below was designed by Frank Roper.

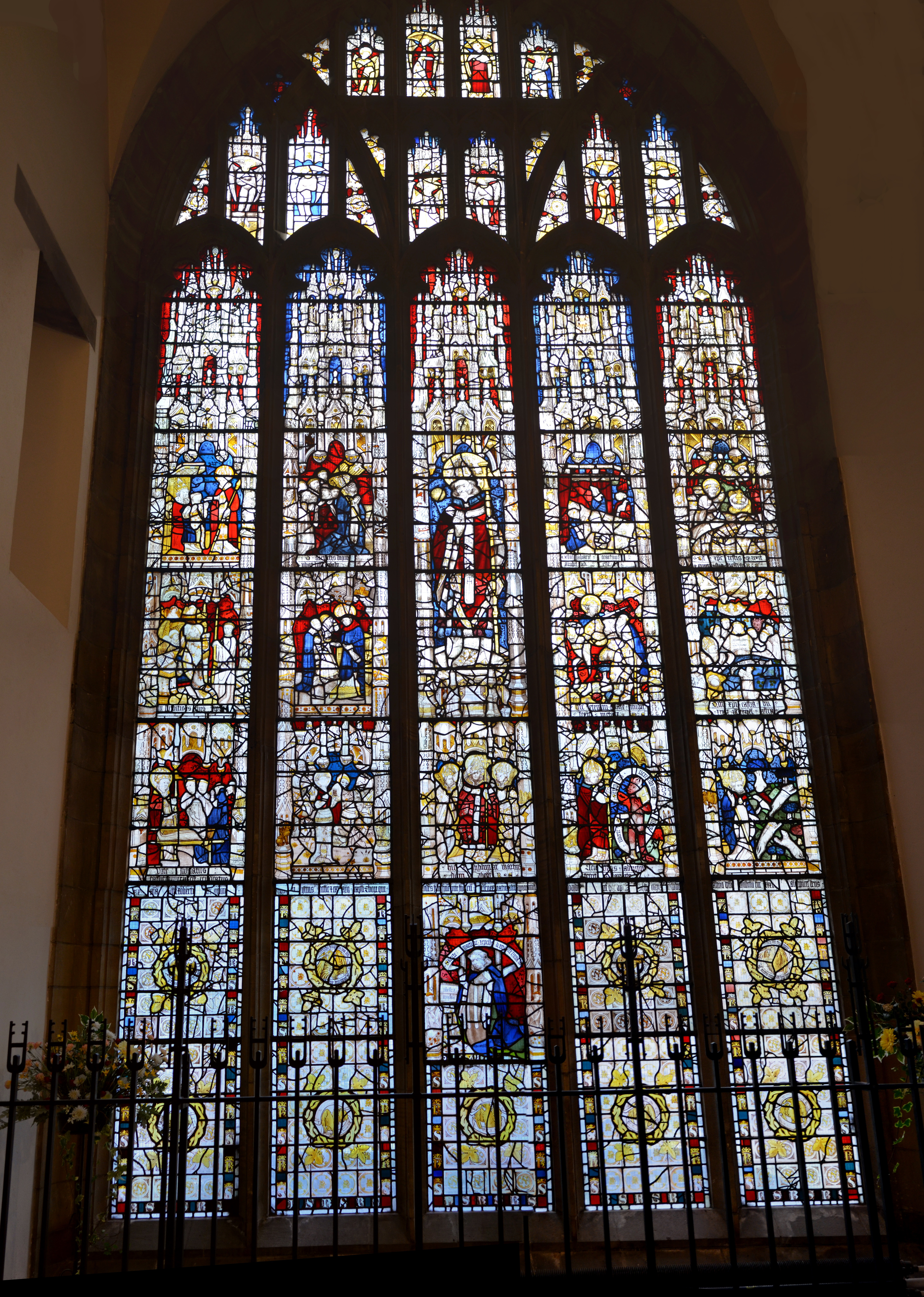
Window showing scenes from the Life of St Martin of Tours, c.1437

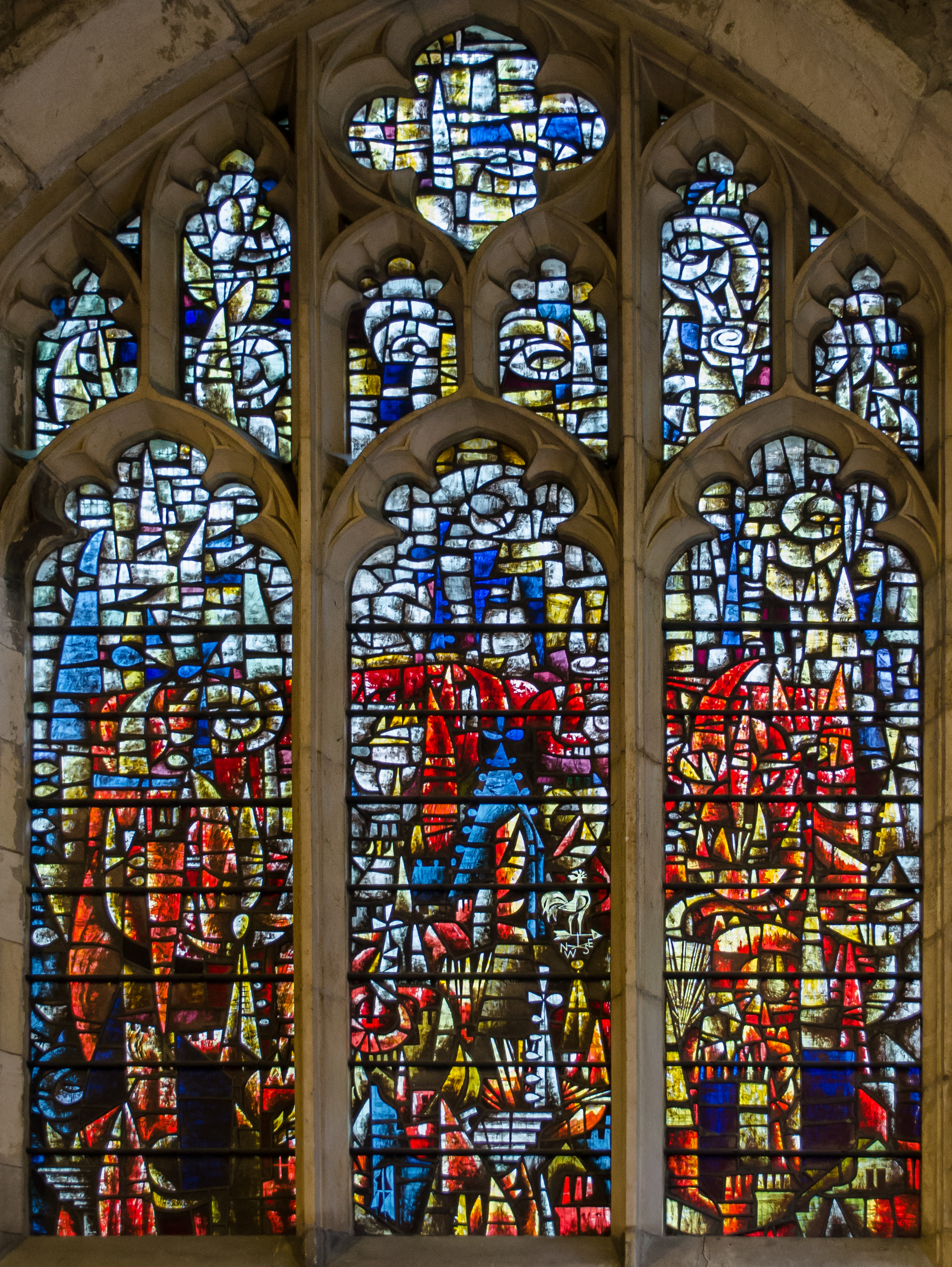
East window by Harry Stammers, 1963

== Parish status ==
The church is in a joint parish with St Helen's Church, Stonegate, York.

== Memorials ==
- Robert Horsfield (d. 1711)
- Thomas Colthurst (d. 1588)
- Lady Elizabeth Sheffield (d. 1633)
- John Kendall (d. 1823) and his wife (d. 1833)
- Valentine Nalson (d. 1722/3)

== Organ ==
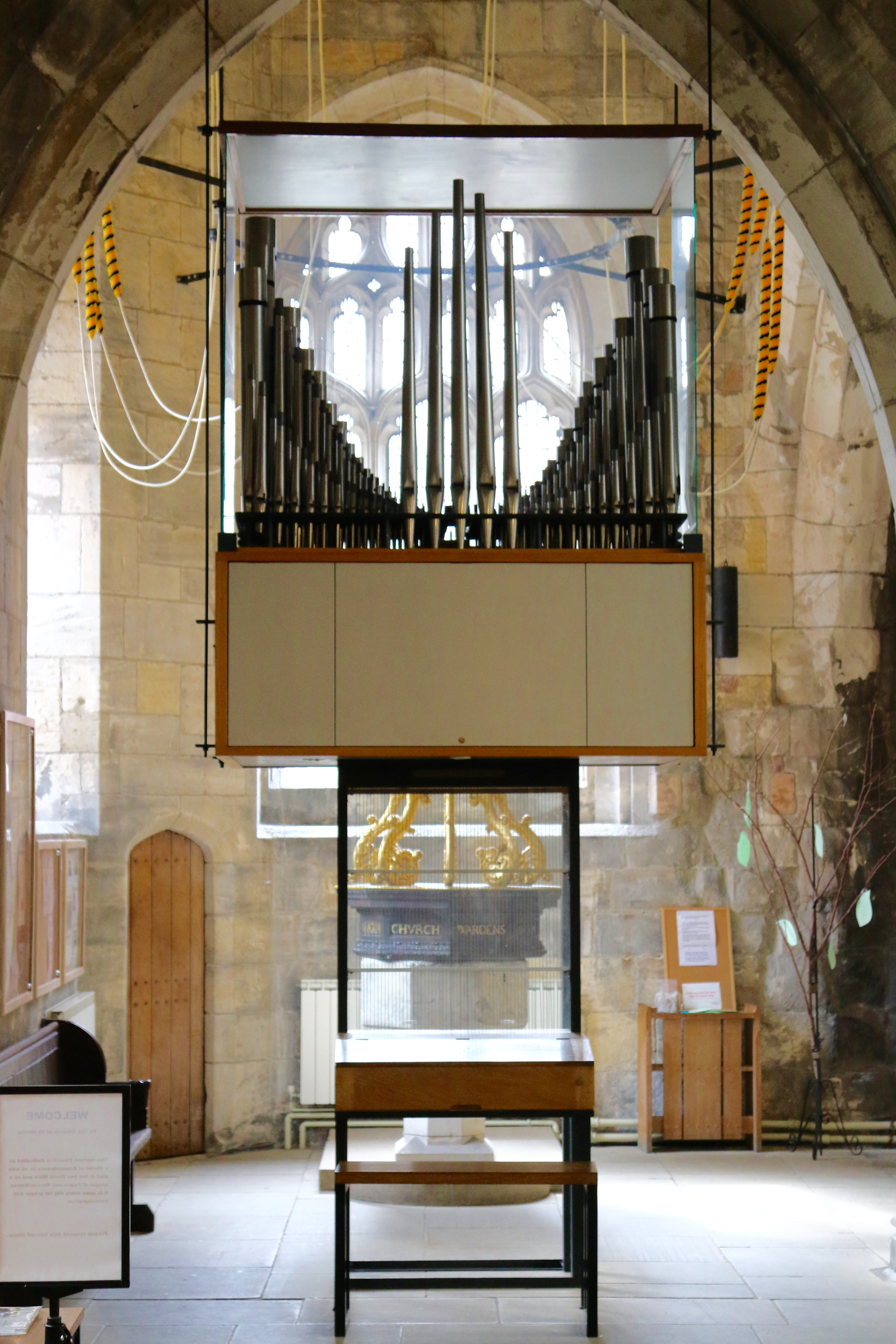
The organ by J. W. Walker & Sons Ltd of 1968

The pipe organ was built by J. W. Walker & Sons Ltd and dates from 1968. It was the gift of the West German government and the Evangelical Church. A specification of the organ can be found on the National Pipe Organ Register.

== See also ==
- Grade II* listed buildings in the City of York
- Listed buildings in York (within the city walls, northern part)
