= Binnya Dala (disambiguation) =

Binnya Dala or Banya Dala was a court title used at the courts of Hanthawaddy kingdom, Toungoo Dynasty and Restored Hanthawaddy Kingdom.

- Viceroy Binnya Kyan of Martaban: Binnya Dala was his title when he was governor of Dala (1414–1422)
- Binnya Dala (Hanthawaddy general): General of Hanthawaddy defeated in the Battle of Naungyo in 1538
- Binnya Dala (minister-general): Chief Minister and general of Toungoo (1559–1573)
- Viceroy Binnya Dala of Martaban (1600–1610s?); Siamese vassal (1600–1605)
- King Binnya Dala of Restored Hanthawaddy (r. 1747–1757)
