= Dala, Bhutan =

Dala
- Location in Bhutan
- Coordinates: 26°51′0″N 89°32′59″E
- Country: Bhutan
- District: Chukha District

Population (2005)
  - Total: 1,652

Dala also written as Tala or Darla is a town in southwestern Bhutan. It is located in Chukha District, 11 km from Gedu town.

At the 2005 census its population was 1,652.

The Bhutan Board Products Ltd. (BBPL) has a large particle board manufacturing plant in Darla.
