= John Petty (primitive Methodist minister) =

Reverend John Petty (1807 – 22 April 1868) was a 19th-century author and primitive Methodist minister, and the first governor of Elmfield College. He was born in Salterforth, Yorkshire and died at Elmfield School, York. Memorial services were held at the Little Stonegate Chapel, York Little Stonegate (Ebenezer) Chapel on 26 April and Petty was buried in York Cemetery on 27 April. In 1903 the Monkgate Primitive Methodist Church in York was officially opened, replacing the Ebenezer Chapel in Little Stonegate. The new building was to be used for the attendance at worship of the boys from Elmfield School. This link with Elmfield was one of the factors behind the naming of the new church the ‘John Petty Memorial Church’, which title surmounts the large window over the main entrance.

== Family ==
Petty was one of the ten children of Micah Petty and his wife Mary Nelson. Micah was a tailor and the grandson of Silvester Petty of Langbar near Ilkley. John Petty married Thirza Sproston (1808–1871) at Bradford in 1832 and they had eight children.

== Life and character ==
John had a taste for learning and in this his father encouraged him. He attended the school of John Driver, a Baptist minister, who, besides following his calling as a hand-loom weaver, undertook to instruct young Petty, a son of his own, and the son and daughter of the neighbouring squire. Primitive Methodist preachers began to visit Salterforth from 1822 and the Petty household was open to them for hospitality. It was under the influence of these preachers that Petty was persuaded to commit his life to Christ. From the time of his conversion at the age of sixteen he began to preach to local congregations. Within two years he was called to work as a hired (i.e. paid) local preacher in the Keighley Circuit, and in 1826 when he was eighteen he was called to the work of the itinerant ministry.

His first circuit (1826–1828) was the Pembrokeshire mission based on Haverfordwest, which was followed by a year at Stroud. In 1829 when he was twenty-one he was appointed to Tunstall, the mother circuit of the Primitive Methodist Connexion, and found that he was named on the plan as superintendent, an indication of the high regard in which he was held very early in his ministry. In 1831 he was transferred to Wearside and in 1832 to Guernsey to take over the Channel Islands mission. From 1835 to 1850 he worked in circuits on the Welsh border and in the Midlands until in 1850 he was moved to London to take responsibility for the publications of the PM Connexion. In 1857 he was asked to undertake a history of the Connexion to be published to mark its golden jubilee in 1860. Between 1857 and 1863 Petty was involved with work at Hull where he was behind building the Jubilee Chapel on Spring Bank. Then the connexion honoured Petty by asking him to assume the governorship of the Elmfield residential schools for boys opened at York early in 1864. The following year it was decided to accept into Elmfield a number of young ministerial candidates and Petty added to his duties those of theological tutor.

== Writings ==
Apart from his History of the Primitive Methodist Connexion published in 1860 Petty wrote many other books. He wrote a memoir of Thomas Batty, three catechisms for use with the young, several volumes of sermons, and a set of lectures, which had been delivered, to the ministerial candidates at Elmfield School.

- John Petty (1860) The History of the Primitive Methodist Connexion, from Its Origin to the Conference of 1859
- 'J.P.' (John Petty): The Primitive Methodist Catechisms; compiled by order of Conference, ..
- John Petty (1863) The constitution of the Primitive Methodist Connexion, or, The form of church government established in the denomination: A lecture delivered in Thornton-Street ... the Young Men's Mutual Improvement Society by John Petty
- John Petty (1873) Systematic theology: A series of lectures delivered to the ministerial students at the Primitive Methodist College, Elmfield, York
