= Swinegate =

Street in York, England

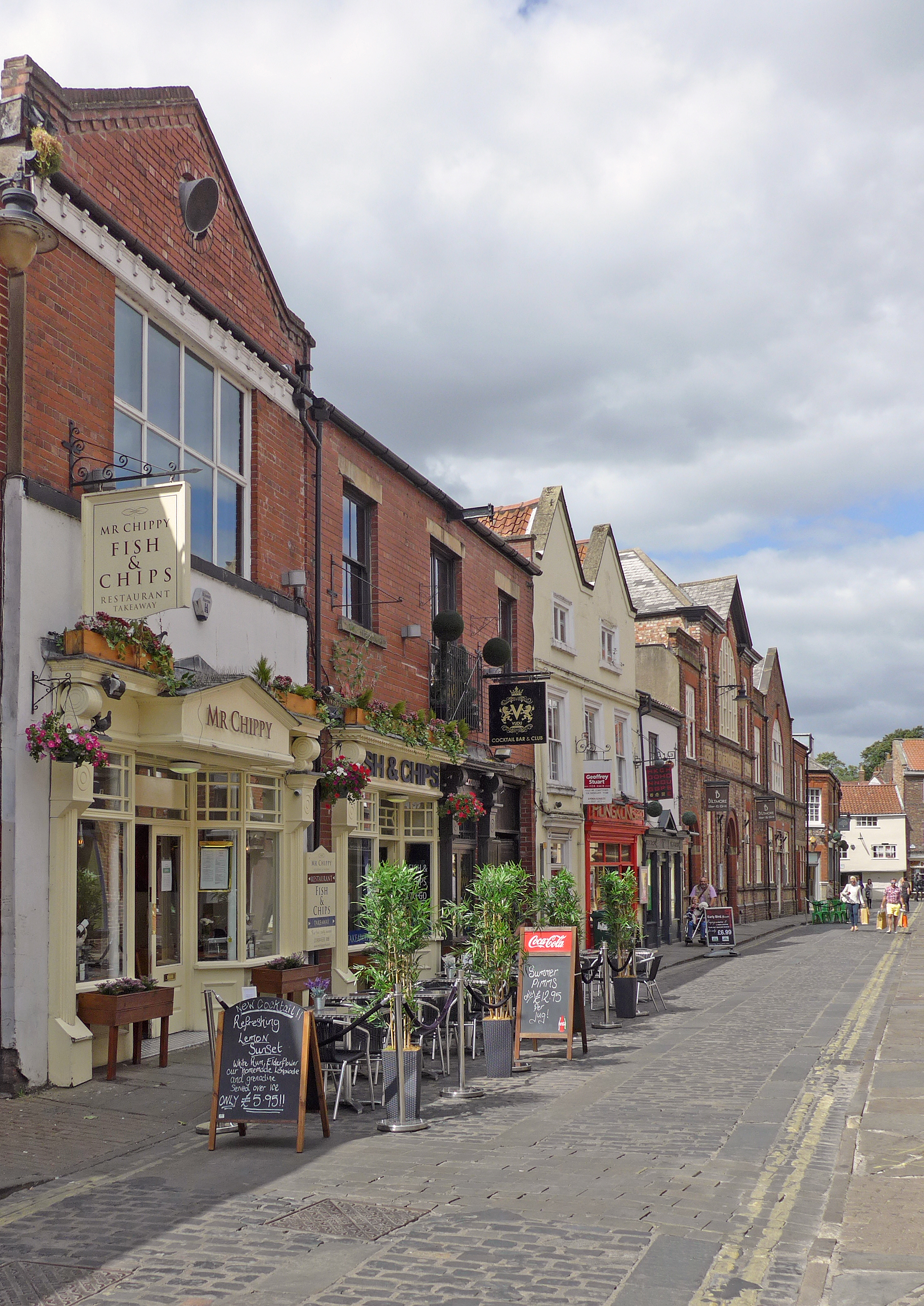
- View north on Swinegate
- Location within York
- Former name: Patrick Pool
- Location: York, England
- Coordinates: 53.9602°N 1.0812°W
- North west end: Grape Lane
- Major junctions: Back Swinegate
- South east end: Church Street; Patrick Pool

Swinegate is a street in the city centre of York, in England.

== History ==
The street lies within the area of Roman Eboracum, and remains of a late Roman building were found in excavations, along with part of a road surface, which may have been a parade ground.

The street was originally part of Patrick Pool, while the name "Swinegate" was given to what are now Little Stonegate and Back Swinegate. In about 1541, the street name was transferred, as pigs began being sold on the street, although this was considered inconvenient and was moved outside Fishergate Bar in 1605.

In the 1760s, the Sandemanians set up a meeting room on the street. St Sampson's Church Infant School opened on the street in 1861, but closed in 1873. The York Central Mission built a chapel on the street in 1910, which was later taken over by the Elim Pentecostal Church. The street is now lined with cafes, restaurants and designer shops.

== Layout and architecture ==
The street runs south-east from the junction of Grape Lane and Coffee Yard, to its junction with Church Street and Patrick Pool. Back Swinegate runs off the south-west side of the street, as does the snickelway Three Cranes Lane, while the Lund's Court snickelway runs off the north-east side.

Notable buildings on the south-west side of the street include the Elim Tabernacle, built in 1910; 31 Swinegate, built in the early-19th century; 33 Swinegate, from the second quarter of the 18th-century, but with some 17th-century structure; and 39 Swinegate, a modern building with some timber framing from around 1600 in the side wall. Part of the north-east side is taken up by Swinegate Court.
