= Dallah =

Dallah may refer to:

- Dallah (Mali), a town in Mali
- Dallah (coffee pot), a traditional pot with a long spout, used to make Arabic coffee
