= Grape Lane =

Street in York, England

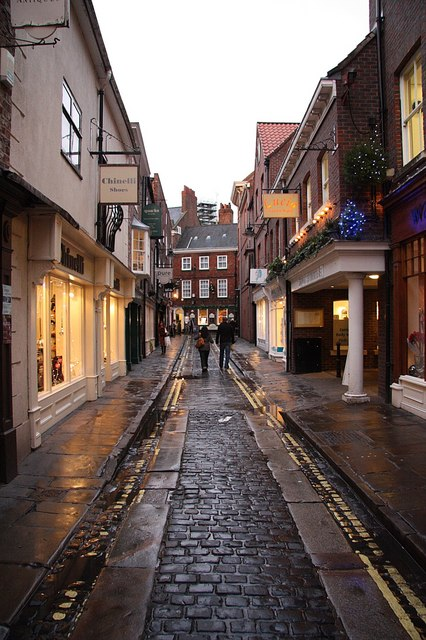
- Grape Lane, seen from Swinegate, in 2009
- Location within York
- Former name: Grapcunt Lane
- Location: York, England
- Coordinates: 53.9609°N 1.0820°W
- North west end: Low Petergate
- South east end: Swinegate

Grape Lane is a street in the city centre of York, in England.

== History ==
The site of the street lay within the city walls of Roman Eboracum, and Roman goods have been found under the soil. Remains of Mediaeval buildings have also been found.

The street was first recorded in 1276, as "venella Sancti Benedicti". By 1329, it was known as "Grapcunt Lane", believed to be in reference to prostitution in the area. St Benedict's Church, on the street, was built in 1154, but had been demolished by 1300. Its site was later given to the Vicars Choral of York Minster, and the site became known as "Benet's Rents".

The Grape Lane chapel was constructed in 1781 for the Countess of Huntingdon's Connexion. It was sold to the Methodist New Connexion in 1799, let to the Wesleyan Methodists in 1804, and then sold to a Calvinistic Baptist group in 1806, and on to the Primitive Methodists in 1820. Later serving as a furniture store, it survived until 1963, when it was demolished. Also in 1963, the Petergate end of the street was widened when 59 Low Petergate was demolished.

== Layout and architecture ==
The street runs south-west from Low Petergate to its junction with Swinegate and the snickelway Coffee Yard. Notable buildings on the north-west side include the Norman Court complex; 7 Grape Lane, built around 1600; the large mid-Victorian 13 Grape Lane; 15 Grape Lane, built about 1800; 17 Grape Lane, an early-19th-century building; 19 Grape Lane, an early-15th-century timber-framed building; and the early-19th century 21 Grape Street. The south-east side is occupied by Swinegate Court.
