= St Helen's Church, Stonegate, York =

Listed church in England

St Helen's Church
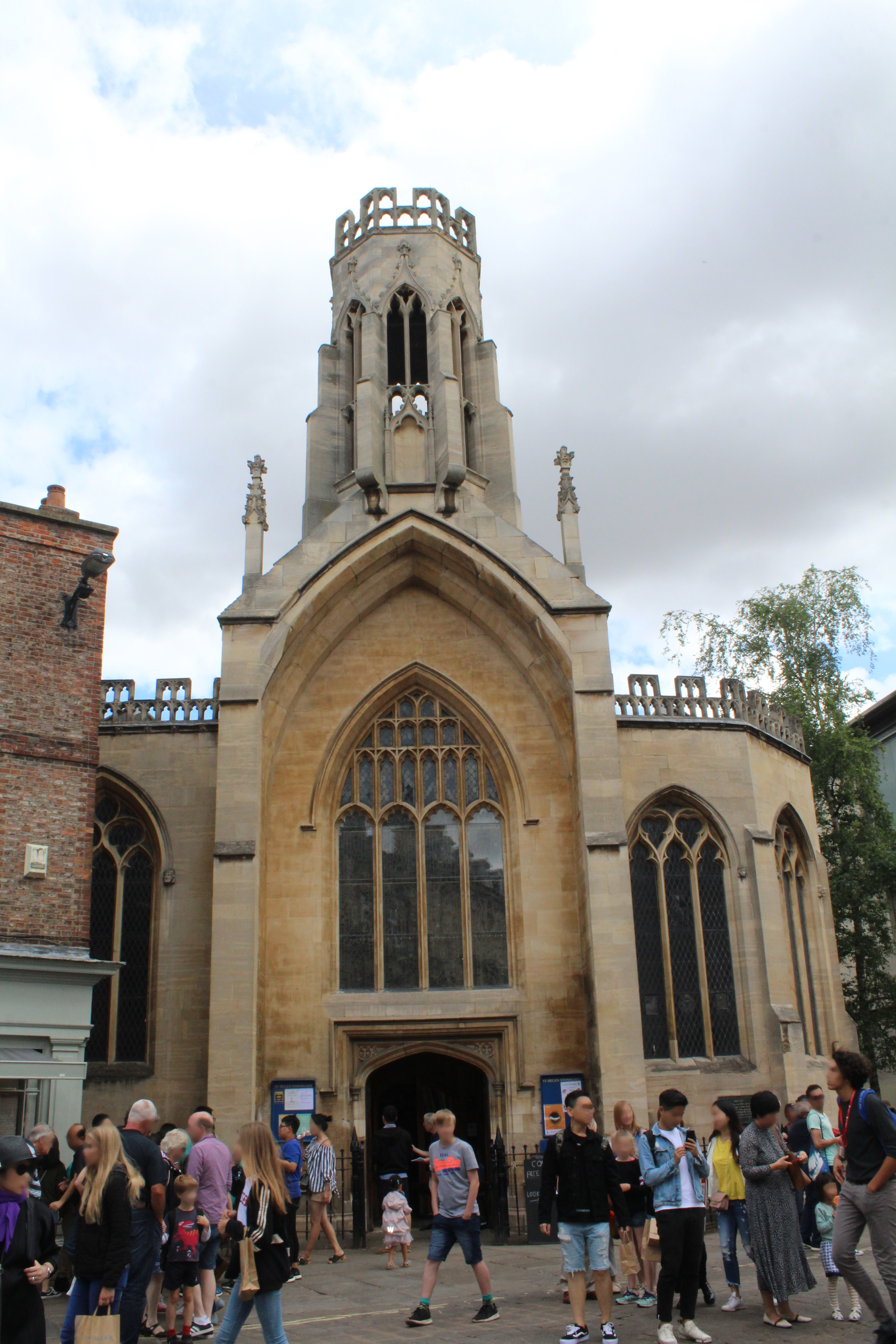
- The church in 2018
- St Helen's Church
- 53.960321°N 1.083969°W
- Location: Stonegate, York
- Country: England
- Denomination: Church of England
- Churchmanship: High Church
- Website: sthelenwithstmartinyork.org.uk

History
- Dedication: St Helen

Architecture
- Heritage designation: Grade II* listed

Administration
- Province: Province of York
- Diocese: Diocese of York
- Archdeaconry: York
- Deanery: York
- Parish: St Helen, Stonegate with St Martin, Coney Street

Clergy
- Rector: Interregnum
- Vicar: Revd. Kingsley Boulton

St Helen's Church is a Grade II* listed parish church in the Church of England on Stonegate in the city of York.

== History ==
The church dates from the 14th century. It was declared redundant in 1551 and partially demolished, but survived and was later brought back into use.

It was reconstructed between 1857 and 1858 by W. H. Dykes and reopened on 16 September 1858. The north, south and east walls were taken down and rebuilt, the roof was replaced, and pews were removed in favour of open seating. The chancel was rebuilt and extended by 10 feet (3 m). Gas lighting was installed, with standard gaseliers of polished brass and iron, and the chancel was fitted with a gas corona with 24 lights. The tower was rebuilt between 1875 and 1876 by W. Atkinson of York.

== Parish status ==
The church is in a joint parish with St Martin le Grand, York.

== Memorials ==
- John Stow (d. 1775)
- William Brooke (d. 1789)
- Ann Acaster (d. 1834)
- Thomas Hartley (d. 1808)
- James Atkinson (d. 1839)
- Ann Atkinson (d. 1840)
- Barbara Davyes (d. 1765)
- Elizabeth Davyes (d. 1767)
- Tobias Conyars (d. 1868)
- Elizabeth Acklam (d. 1722)

== Organ ==
The pipe organ was built by J. W. Walker & Sons Ltd and dates from 1959. A specification of the organ can be found on the National Pipe Organ Register.

== See also ==
- Grade II* listed buildings in the City of York
- Listed buildings in York (within the city walls, northern part)
