= Tourism in Yorkshire =

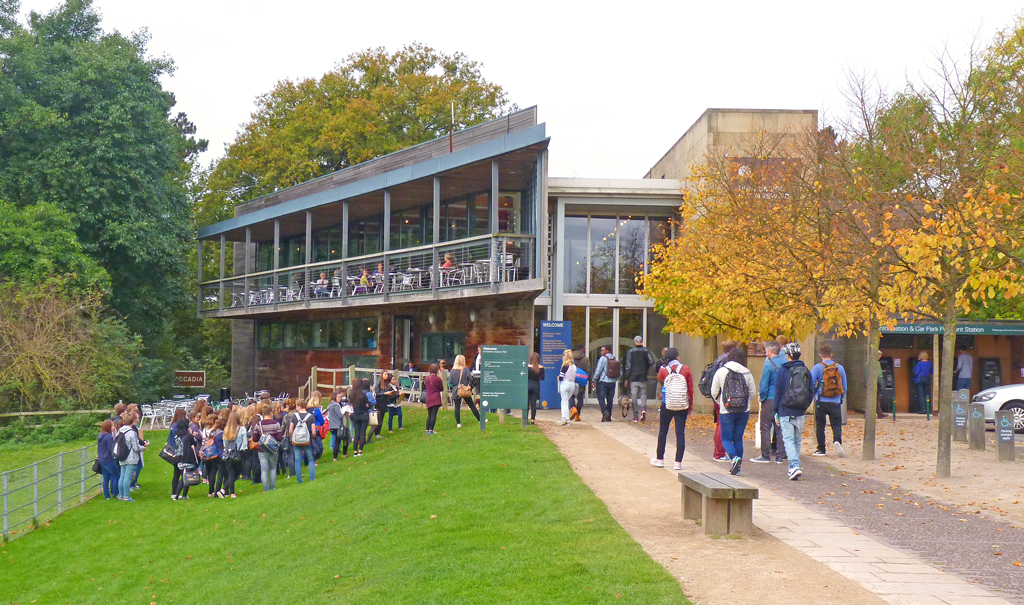
Tourists at Yorkshire Sculpture Park

Tourism in Yorkshire generates more than £9 billion per annum and supporting almost 225,000 jobs. During 2007 recorded 92 million day visitors and 12.8 million that stayed at least one night in the region. By 2015, the value of tourism was in excess of £7 billion. Yorkshire is around 6,000 square miles (16,000 km^{2}) in size. The official tourism body for the region was Welcome to Yorkshire until it became insolvent in 2022. As of December 2023, Local Visitor Economy Partnerships to manage tourism have been announced for Hull and East Yorkshire, York and North Yorkshire, and West Yorkshire.

== Places to stay ==
In the county of Yorkshire there is a choice of almost 4,800 hotels, guest houses, self-catering establishments and campsites. It is distributed unevenly throughout the region with the greatest numbers of beds to be found in the North York Moors, Yorkshire Dales and around Harrogate. West Yorkshire and South Yorkshire account for the largest stock of serviced accommodation, but offer very little in the way of camping or caravan accommodation.

== Getting around ==
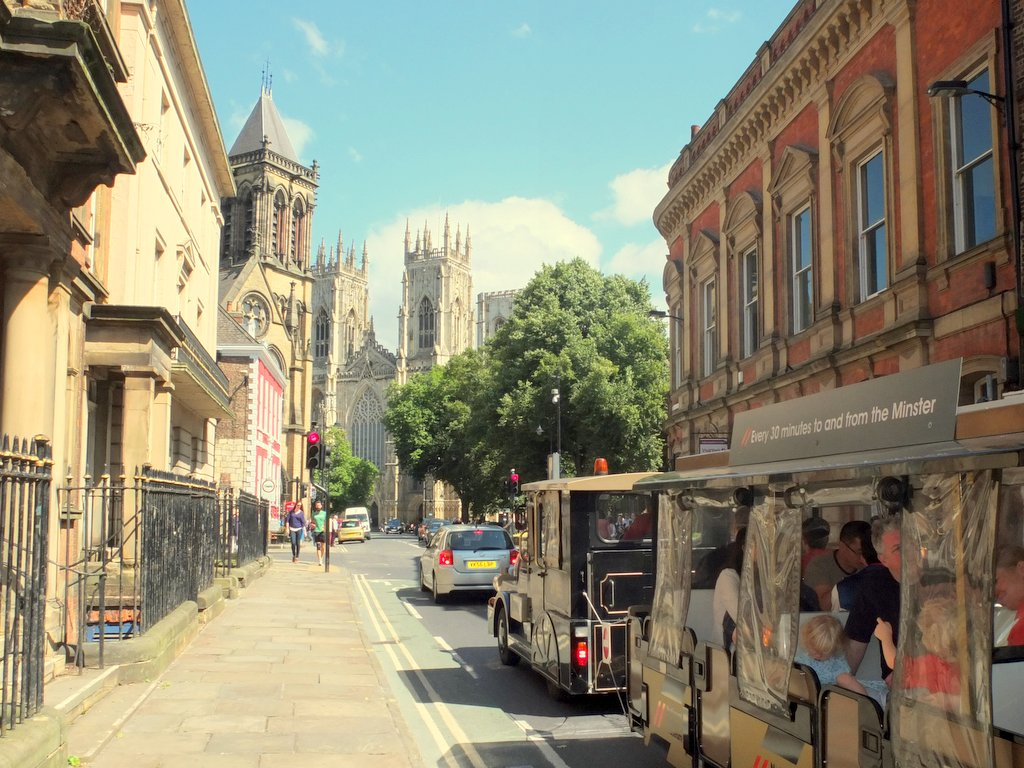
A trackless train service for tourists in central York

Major Yorkshire cities such as York, Leeds, Hull and Sheffield can be reached from London in less than two hours by train. Leeds Bradford Airport serves many destinations in Europe and Africa and the port of Hull offers services to major European ferry ports at Rotterdam and Zeebrugge.

Major road links include: the M62 from Hull to Manchester; the M1 from Leeds to London; the A1 and A1(M) which passes North to South through Yorkshire; the M18 which connects the M1, A1(M) and the M62, and the M180 which extends from the M18 to A180 at Grimsby.

== Tourist attractions in Yorkshire ==
=== City attractions ===
The city of York attracted 3.95 million visitors in 2004 of which 24 per cent were from overseas. Visitors spent a total of £283.6 million in the city during 2004. The walled city of is the county capital of Yorkshire and was founded by the Romans in AD 71 on a fortified site at the confluence of the River Foss and River Ouse. The city skyline is dominated by the medieval Gothic style York Minster, and has a rich heritage and culture developed over 2,000 years. York's top three tourist attractions are the National Railway Museum, York Minster and the Jorvik Viking Centre. Other attractions include Merchant Adventurers' Hall, The Shambles, Clifford's Tower and York's smallest street Whip-Ma-Whop-Ma-Gate. In the 2017 Condé Nast Traveler survey of readers, York rated 12th among The 15 Best Cities in the UK for visitors.

A 2014 report, based on 2012 data, stated that the city receives 6.9 million visitors annually; they contribute £564 million to the economy and support over 19,000 jobs.

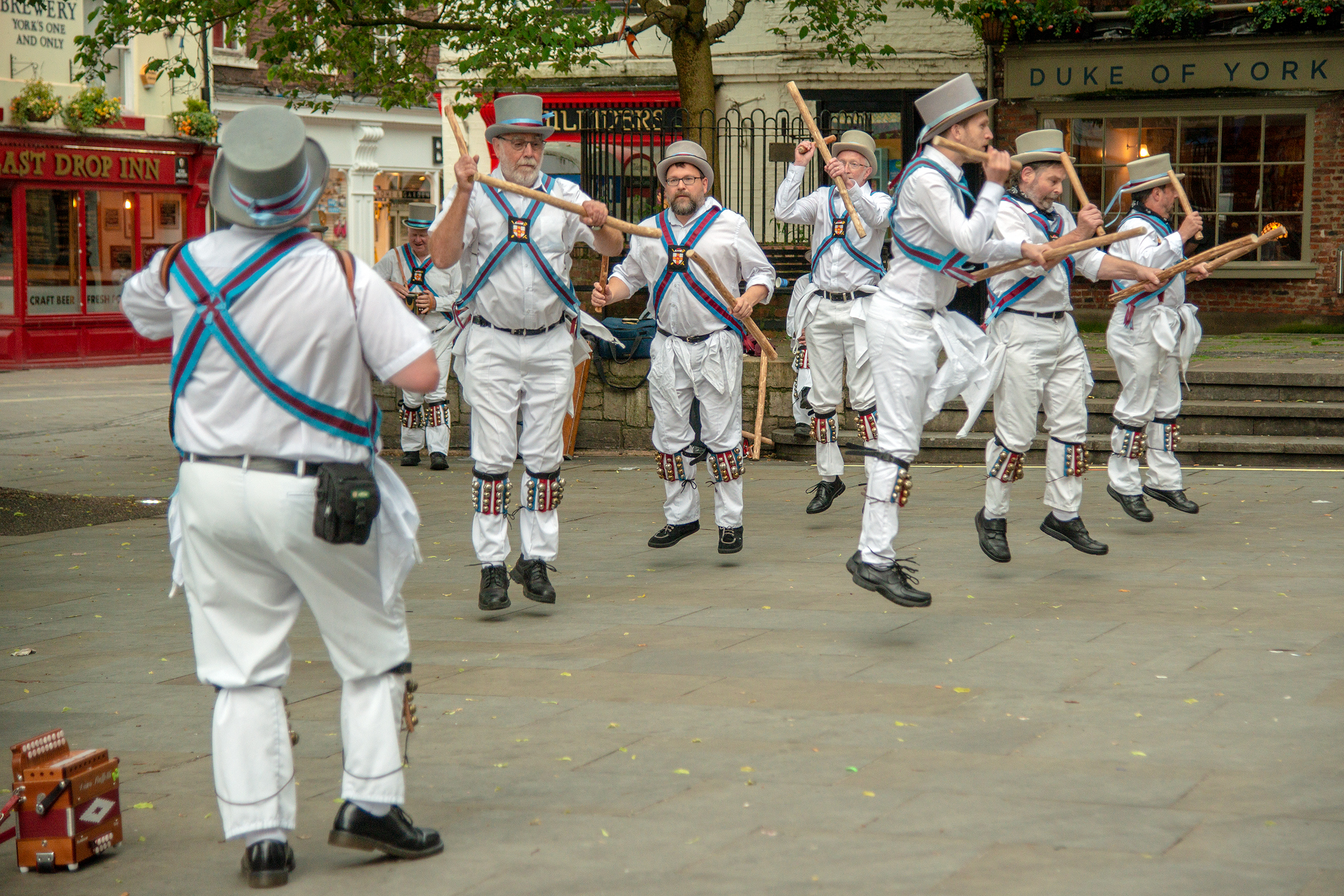
Morris dancers entertain tourists on a York street corner near The Shambles

Leeds is Yorkshire's largest city based on resident population. Attractions include Roundhay Park, Leeds City Museum, Leeds Art Gallery and the Henry Moore Institute. In the 2017 Condé Nast Traveler survey, Leeds rated sixth.

Sheffield is Yorkshire's second largest city based on resident population. Attractions include the Sheffield Winter Gardens which attracted 2.5 million visitors in 2008 making it the most visited tourist attraction in Yorkshire and placing it in the UK's top 20 list of attractions.

Yorkshire's third largest city of Bradford is home to the National Media Museum, which was the third most visited tourist attraction in Yorkshire in 2008.

Scarborough, Whitby and Bridlington are popular seaside towns located on the North Sea coast of Yorkshire and close to the picturesque Yorkshire Moors. All three towns have sandy beaches that attract many day trippers and holidaymakers during the summer months.

=== Major rural tourist attractions ===
Although North Yorkshire is the UK's largest county in size it is the second lowest population density in England. The Yorkshire Moors is an area of outstanding natural beauty designated as a National Park in 1952 and situated in the county of North Yorkshire. It contains one of the largest expanses of heather moorland in the UK.

The Yorkshire Dales National Park was established in 1954 and offers visitors outstanding scenery, a variety of wildlife and recreation options.

An area known as the 'Yorkshire Nature Triangle' comprises some of the county's most popular wildlife-watching locations and stretches from Bridlington in the north, to Spurn in the south eastern corner and across to the Vale of York. It includes popular sites like the RSPB's Bempton Cliffs, Spurn Point and more than 20 other nature reserves. Wildlife that draws many visitors to the area includes puffins, bitterns, whale-watching from Whitby, otters, avocets and red kites. The 2015 Easter Special edition of the Springwatch TV show was broadcast from the county's East Coast seabird colonies.

The moorland and the village of Haworth in Brontë Country are also popular tourist destinations owing to the work of the Brontë sisters.

The rural town of Holmfirth on the border of the Peak District National Park, famously the filming location for the world's longest-running comedy Last of the Summer Wine, is enjoyed by a great many tourists for its culture, cafes, restaurants and scenery.

=== Other major attractions ===
Other major tourist attractions in Yorkshire include:

- White Scar Cave, Ingleton: The Longest Show Cave in England and the UK.
- Xscape, Castleford: Artificial ski area, climbing zone and skate park.
- The Deep Aquarium, Hull: Aquarium that houses 40 sharks and over 3,500 fish.
- Sewerby Hall and Gardens, Bridlington: Grade II listed stately home with extensive gardens situated on the Yorkshire coast.

== See also ==
- Yorkshire
- Tourism in England
