= 22–23 The Shambles =

Listed building in York, England

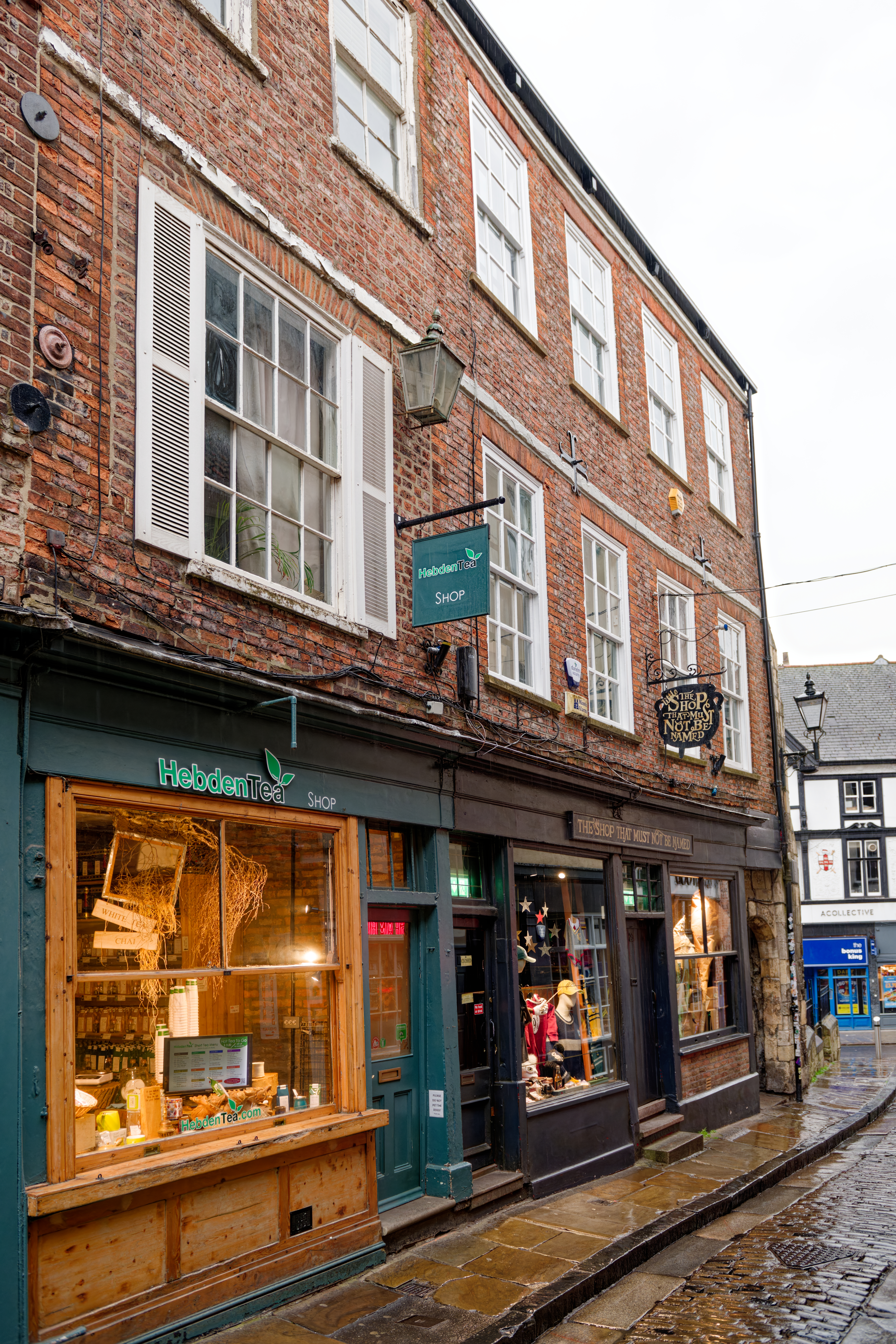
- The building in 2024
- Interactive map of the 22–23 The Shambles area

General information
- Location: The Shambles and Whip-Ma-Whop-Ma-Gate, York, England
- Coordinates: 53°57′33″N 1°04′47″W
- Completed: Early 18th century
- Renovated: 19th and 20th centuries (altered and shopfronts)

Design and construction
- Designations

Listed Building – Grade II
- Official name: 1A and 1½, Whip-Ma-Whop-Ma-Gate, 22 and 23, Shambles
- Designated: 14 June 1954
- Reference no.: 1256683

22–23 The Shambles (officially listed as 1A and 1½ Whip-Ma-Whop-Ma-Gate, 22 and 23 Shambles) is a historic pair of buildings on The Shambles and Whip-Ma-Whop-Ma-Gate in York, England. Grade II listed, parts of the buildings date to the early 18th century, with further alterations made over the following two hundred years.

== Architecture ==
The front is built in orange‑red brick, with the right side mixing limestone at lower levels with brick above, and the rear wing being brick throughout. Roofs are pantiled with brick chimneys.

The main front has three storeys and four windows, with a passage at the right leading to Whip‑Ma‑Whop‑Ma‑Gate. Two shopfronts sit beneath a shared cornice: No. 22 has a large glass window and a glazed, panelled door; No. 23 has a newer boarded door with a small iron‑grilled light above and a wide sash window. Upper floors have 12‑pane sash windows set on stone sills. A painted stone band marks the second floor, with a matching eaves cornice above.

At the rear, a flat‑arched passage sits beside a later small‑pane window. The right return incorporates part of the former St Crux Church, with two short attic sash windows.

The rear wing is three storeys with four windows. At the left is a six‑panel door under an elliptical brick arch, with a round‑arched staircase window above. To the right is a simple shopfront with small‑pane glazing and a margin‑glazed door. Some windows have been replaced with later small‑pane types, but most across the rear, return and wing are 12‑pane sashes with stone sills and elliptical brick heads. Raised brick bands run around the building at first‑floor, second‑floor and eaves level.

== See also ==
- Listed buildings in York (within the city walls, northern part)
