= 35 The Shambles =

Listed building in York, England

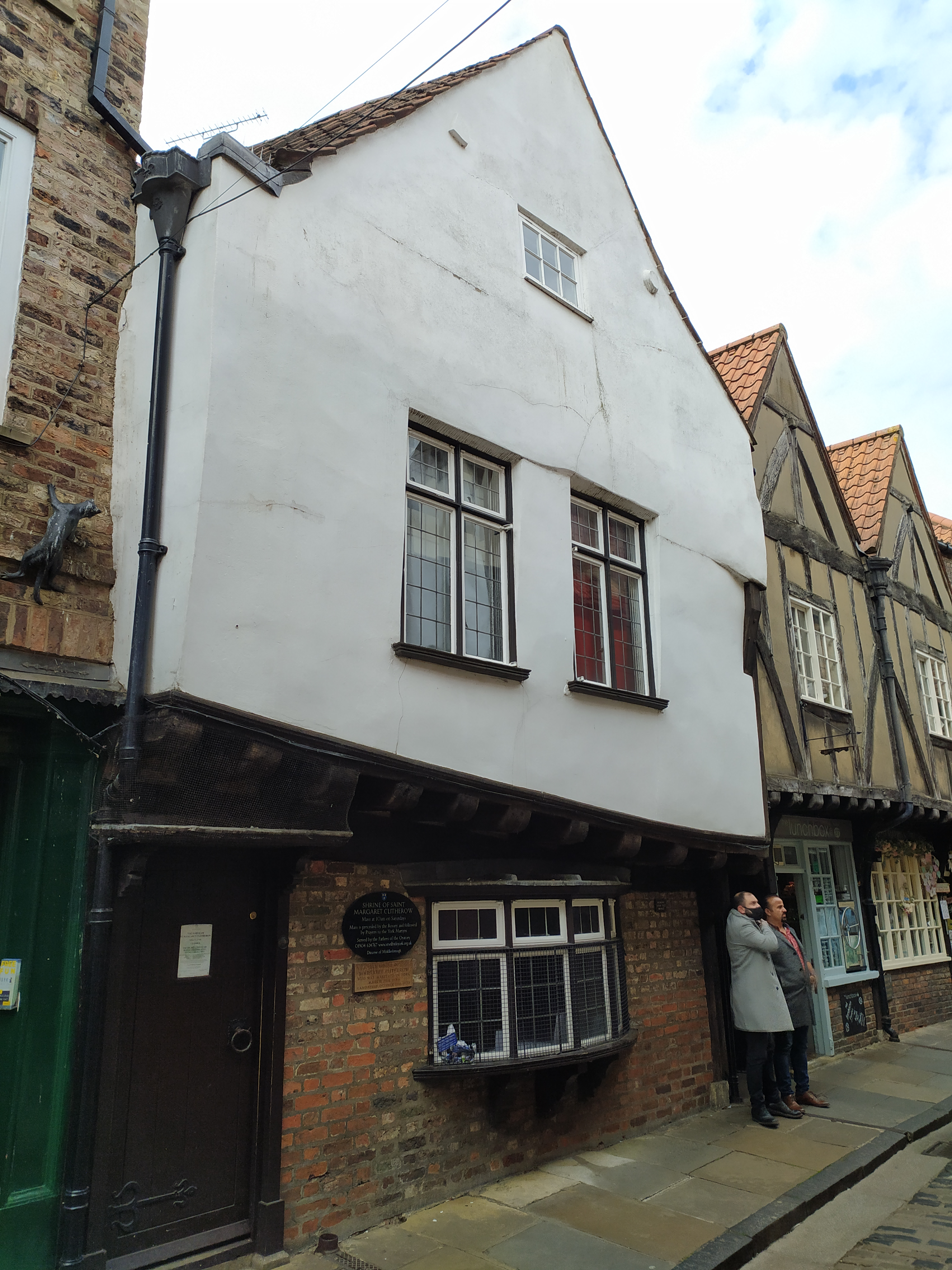
- The building in 2020

- Location within York Central
- Alternative names: Shrine of St Margaret Clitherow

General information
- Location: The Shambles, York, England
- Coordinates: 53.959276°N 1.080123°W
- Year built: Mid-14th century

Technical details
- Floor count: 3

Design and construction
- Designations

Listed Building – Grade II*
- Official name: Shrine of St Margaret Clitherow
- Designated: 14 June 1954
- Reference no.: 1256688

35 The Shambles is a historic building in York, England. A Grade II* listed building, part of the structure dates to the mid-14th century, with an extension added the following century. The ground floor was rebuilt in variegated brick in Flemish bond; the two upper levels are rendered. The building contains a priest-hole fireplace.

== St Margaret Clitherow ==
On the ground floor is a shrine to St Margaret Clitherow, who was married to a butcher who owned and lived in a shop in the street. Her home is thought to have been No. 10 Shambles, on the opposite side of the street to the shrine.

== See also ==
- Grade II* listed buildings in the City of York
- Listed buildings in York (within the city walls, northern part)
