= Margaret Middleton =

Margaret Middleton may refer to:

- Margaret Clitherow (1556–1586), née Middleton, English saint and martyr
- Yvonne De Carlo (1922–2007), actress, real name Margaret Middleton
