= 31–33 The Shambles =

Listed terrace in York, England

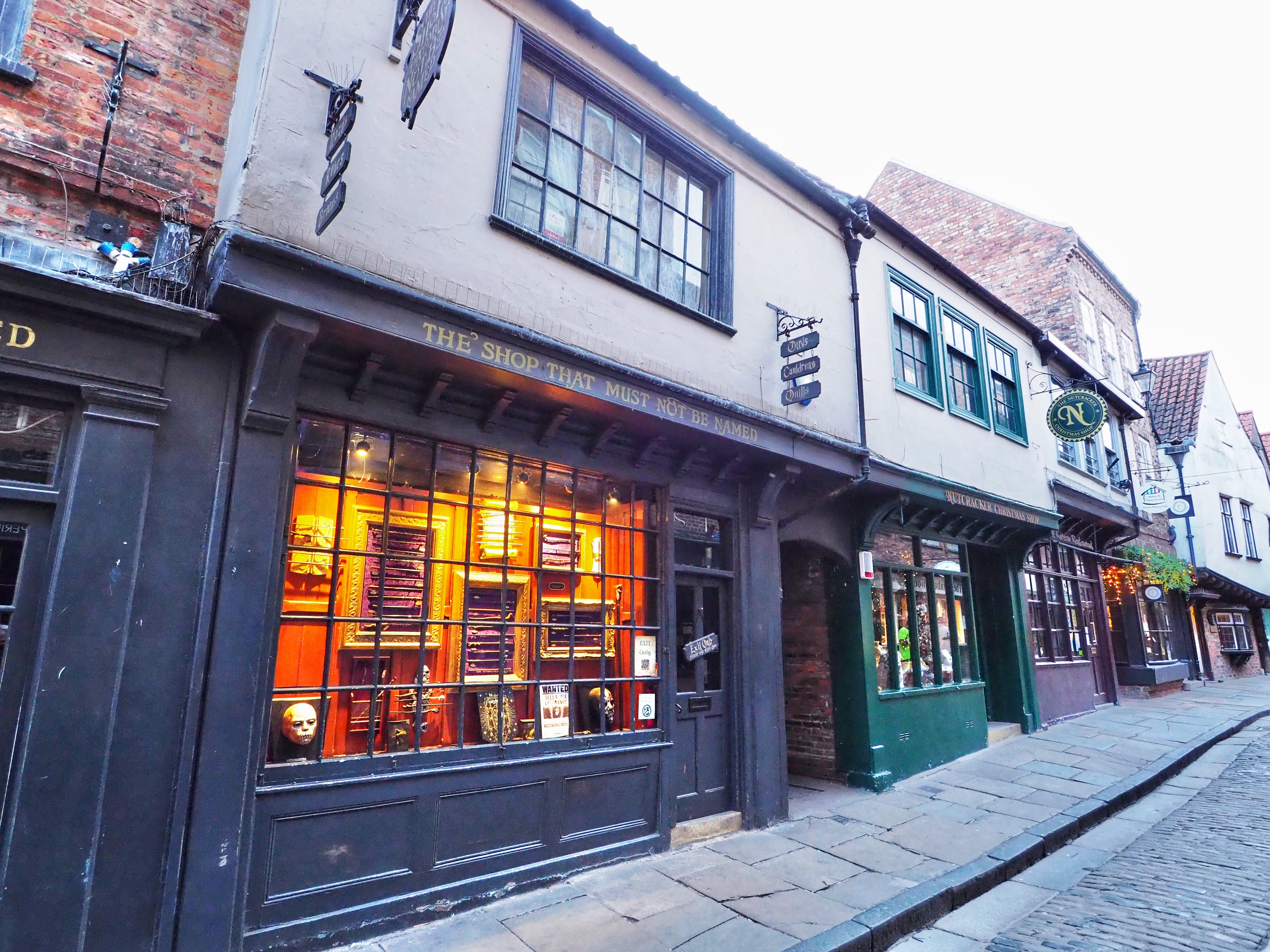
- The terrace in 2024
- Interactive map of the 31–33 The Shambles area

General information
- Location: The Shambles, York, England
- Coordinates: 53°57′33″N 1°04′48″W
- Completed: Early 15th century
- Renovated: 19th century (altered) c. 1960 (renovated)

Design and construction
- Designations

Listed Building – Grade II
- Official name: 31, 32 and 33, Shambles
- Designated: 14 June 1954
- Reference no.: 1256686

31–33 The Shambles is a historic terrace on The Shambles in York, England. Grade II listed, parts of the buildings date to the early 15th century, with further alterations in the 19th century and renovation around 1960.

As of 2023, No. 31 (and the adjacent No. 30) was occupied by The Shop That Must Not Be Named.

== Architecture ==
The building has a timber frame with a white‑washed front, and the rear was later rebuilt in mixed brick. It has pantile roofs. The front is two storeys and three bays wide. A passageway runs between Nos. 31 and 32, marked by a shaped lintel.

No. 31 has a small‑pane shop window above a panelled base, with a partly glazed four‑panel door and overlight to its right. The upper floor projects slightly on carved brackets, and its window is a horizontal sliding sash with two sets of small panes. At the rear, some of the original timber framing remains visible.

No. 32 has a similar shopfront, with a six‑light canted window and transom to the left of a recessed glazed door. The first‑floor windows are grouped in threes, each with unequal small panes set in raised surrounds. Both shopfronts share a plain fascia with hanging brackets.

No. 33 has a six‑panel door beside a three‑light small‑pane shop window with transoms, set under a boxed overhang on carved brackets. Its first‑floor window is a group of single‑pane sashes within a raised surround, and a hanging bar survives above the shopfront. The roofline has a moulded cornice on brackets.

== See also ==
- Listed buildings in York (within the city walls, northern part)
