= 27–28 The Shambles =

Listed building in York, England

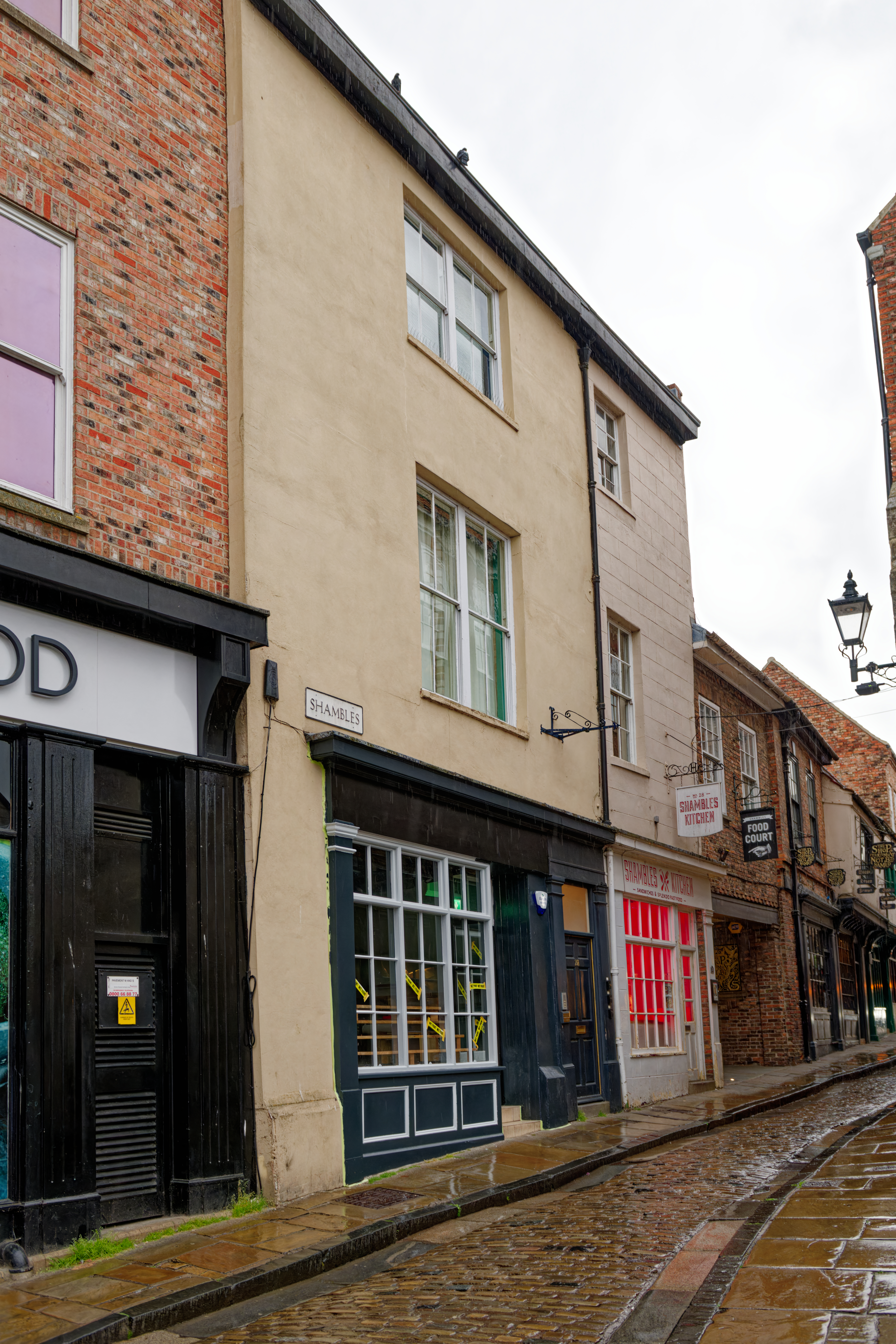
- The building in 2024
- Interactive map of the 27–28 The Shambles area

General information
- Location: The Shambles, York, England
- Coordinates: 53°57′32″N 1°04′48″W
- Completed: c. 1840
- Renovated: 20th century (shopfronts)

Technical details
- Floor count: 3

Design and construction
- Designations

Listed Building – Grade II
- Official name: 27 and 28, Shambles
- Designated: 14 June 1954
- Reference no.: 1256684

27–28 The Shambles is a historic pair of former houses on The Shambles in York, England. Now Grade II listed, parts of the buildings date from around 1840, with further alterations made over the following century.

As of 2026, No. 27 is occupied by a jeweller, and No. 28 houses Shambles Kitchen.

== Architecture ==
The front wall is finished in colour‑washed plaster, with scored render on the other sides, and the building has a timber eaves box and a slate roof edged in brick, with skylights and brick chimneys. It has three storeys with two windows across the front. The combined shopfront, set between plain uprights and a shaped top moulding, has a central panelled door with its overlight filled in. No. 27 has a panelled door and a plate‑glass shop window with sliding upper lights above a panelled base. No. 28 has a changed door and a small‑pane shop window. On the upper floors, No. 27 has pairs of four‑pane sash windows, while No. 28 has 12‑pane sash windows with narrow glazing bars.

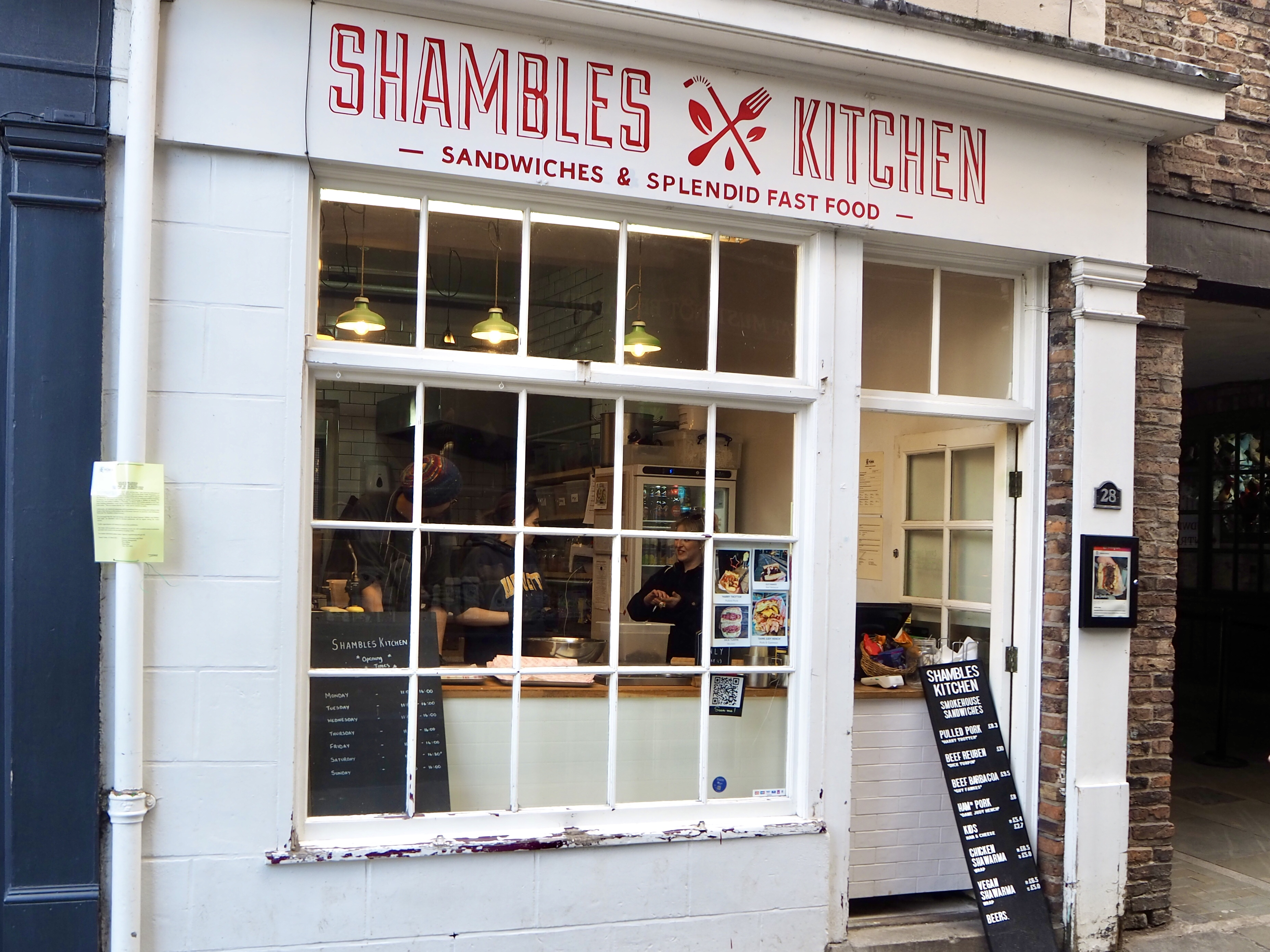
No. 28's shopfront in 2023

== See also ==
- Listed buildings in York (within the city walls, northern part)
