= 9 The Shambles =

Listed building in York, England

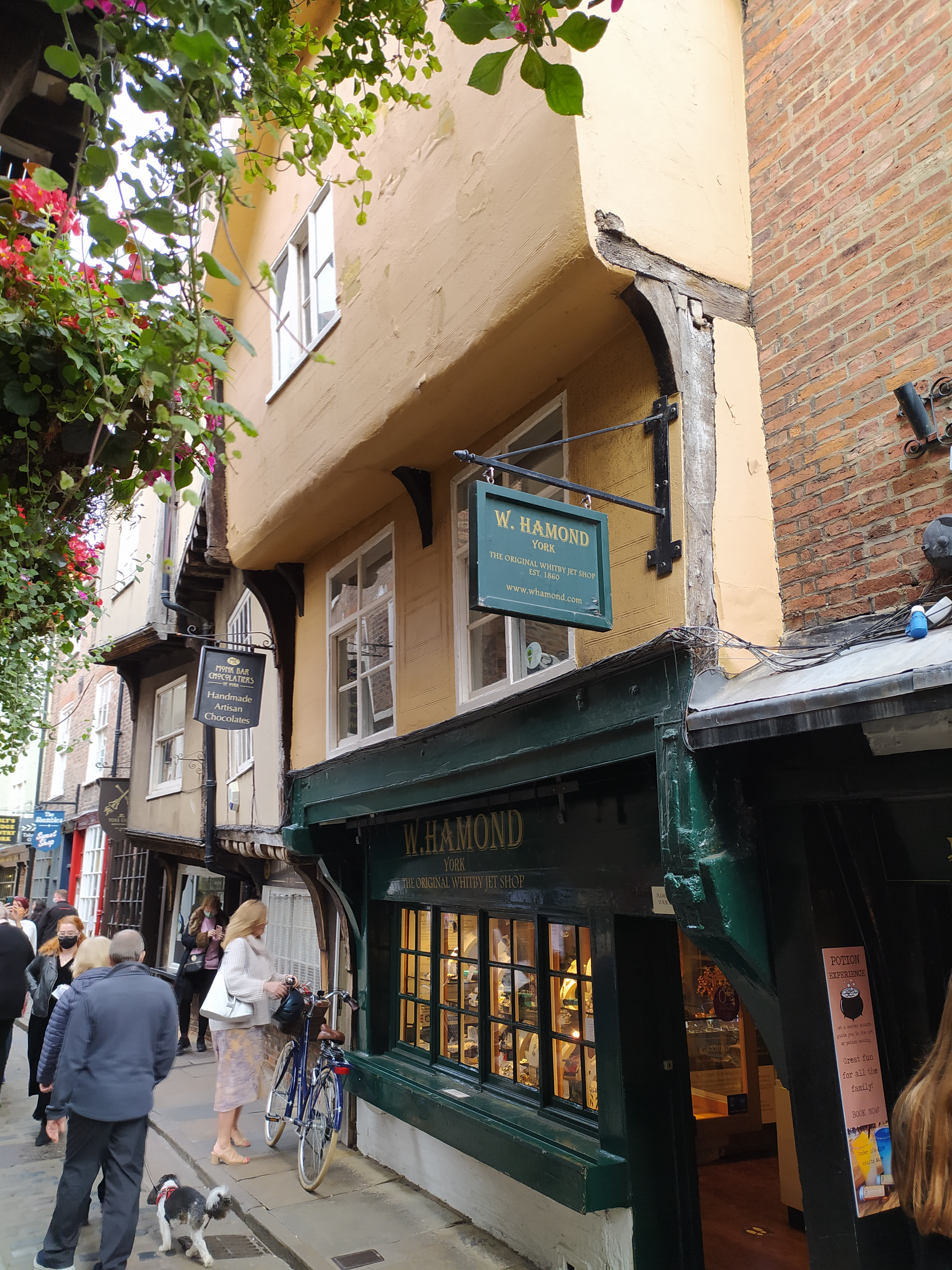
- The building in 2020, looking north
- Interactive map of the 9 The Shambles area

General information
- Location: The Shambles, York, North Yorkshire, England
- Coordinates: 53.959561°N 1.080139°W
- Year built: 15th century
- Renovated: 20th century

Technical details
- Material: Timber framed
- Floor count: 2

Design and construction
- Designations

Listed Building – Grade II*
- Official name: 9, Shambles
- Designated: 14 June 1954
- Reference no.: 1256675

9 The Shambles is a historic building in York, England.

The two-storey timber-framed building was constructed in the 15th century. Both the upper floor and the attic are jettied to The Shambles. The building might originally have been of three bays, but only two survive, and it now adjoins two roughly built bays, dating from the 16th century. The whole roof at the front also dates from this period. A brick chimney breast dates from the 17th century, with a contemporary fireplace in the attic. In the 18th century, the level of the first floor was raised, and the front was pargetted.

The building was Grade II* listed in 1954, and was restored from 1955 onwards. Since 2007, the shop has been the W. Hamond jewellers, which specialises in Whitby jet.

== Gallery ==
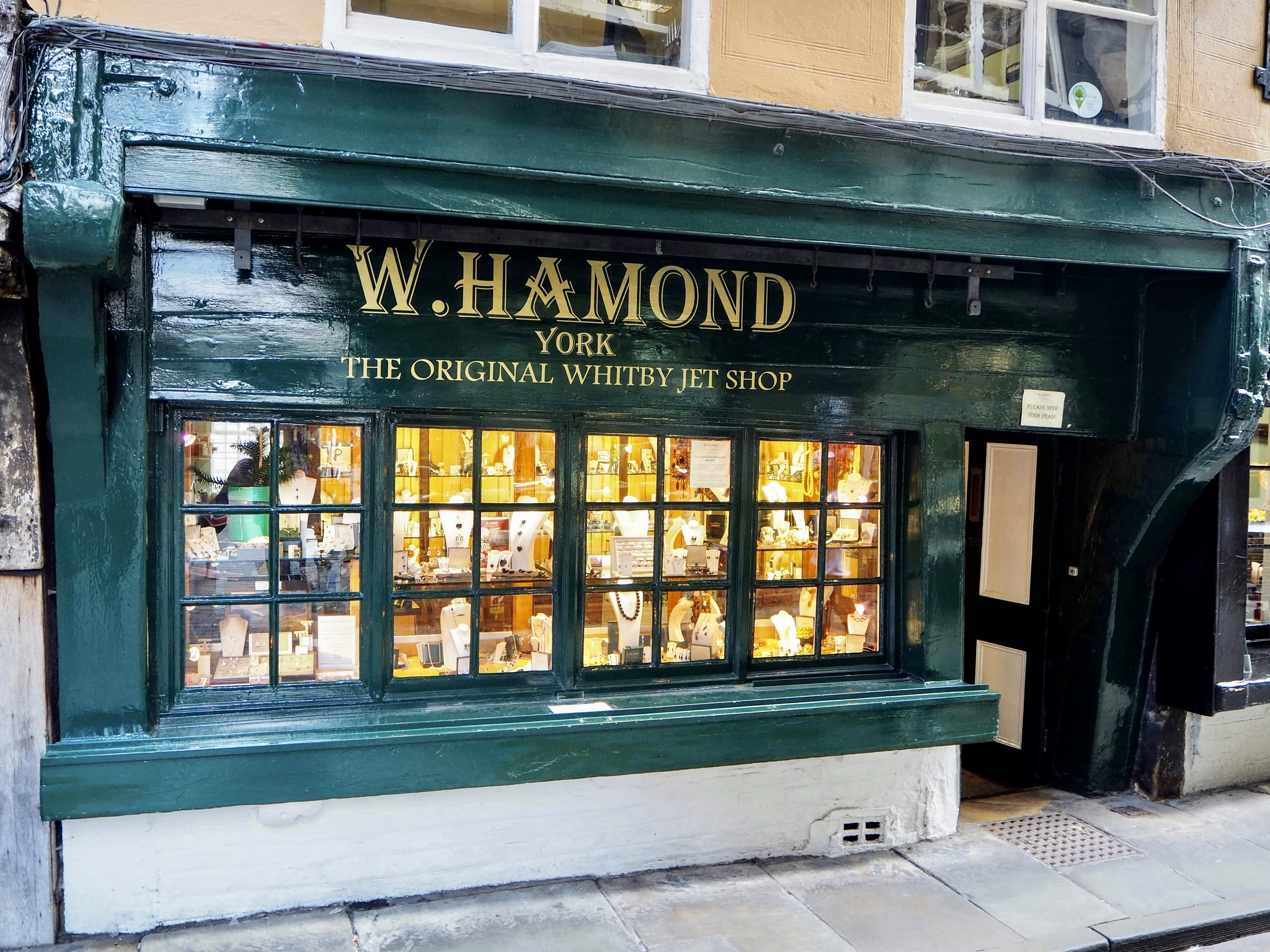
Shop frontage, 2019

== See also ==
- Grade II* listed buildings in the City of York
- Listed buildings in York (within the city walls, northern part)
