= 30 The Shambles =

Listed building in York, England

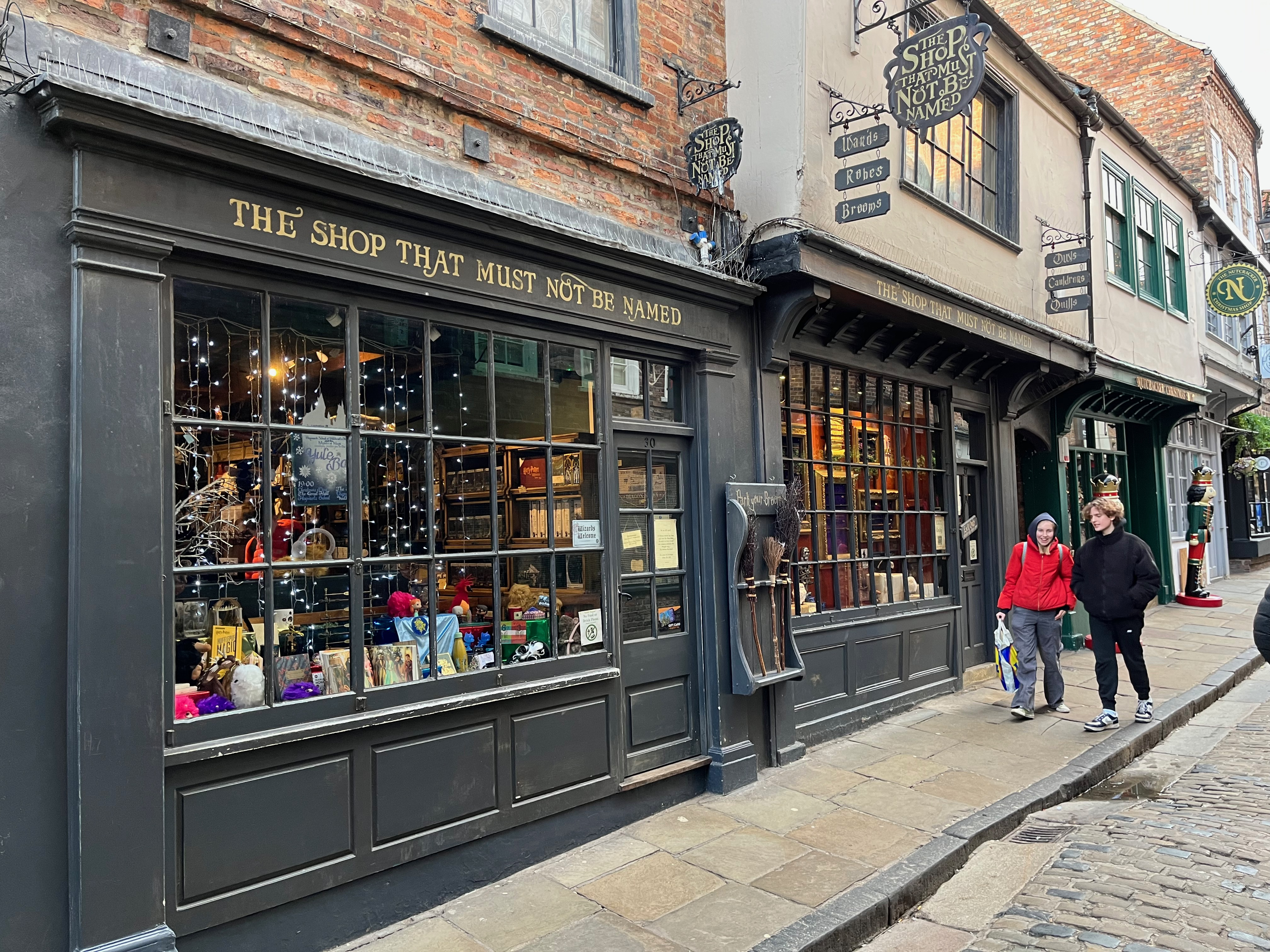
- The building (left) in 2023, when the same business also occupied No. 31
- Interactive map of the 30 The Shambles area

General information
- Location: The Shambles, York, England
- Coordinates: 53°57′33″N 1°04′48″W
- Completed: Mid-18th century
- Renovated: 1952 (partly rebuilt and restored)

Technical details
- Floor count: 2

Design and construction
- Designations

Listed Building – Grade II
- Official name: 30, Shambles
- Designated: 14 June 1954
- Reference no.: 1256685

30 The Shambles is a Grade II listed building on The Shambles in York, England. Part of the structure dates to the mid-18th century and part was rebuilt around 200 years later.

According to Historic England, the building is composed of orange brown brick "in a random bond". It features timber-boxed eaves and a pantile roof. To the left of its façade are a door and passage which lead to Shambles Market. The rainwater head is initialled "TC" and is dated 1763. The building's interior was not inspected.

As of 2023, No. 30 (and the adjacent No. 31) was occupied by The Shop That Must Not Be Named.

== See also ==
- Listed buildings in York (within the city walls, northern part)
