= 10–11 The Shambles =

Listed building in York, England

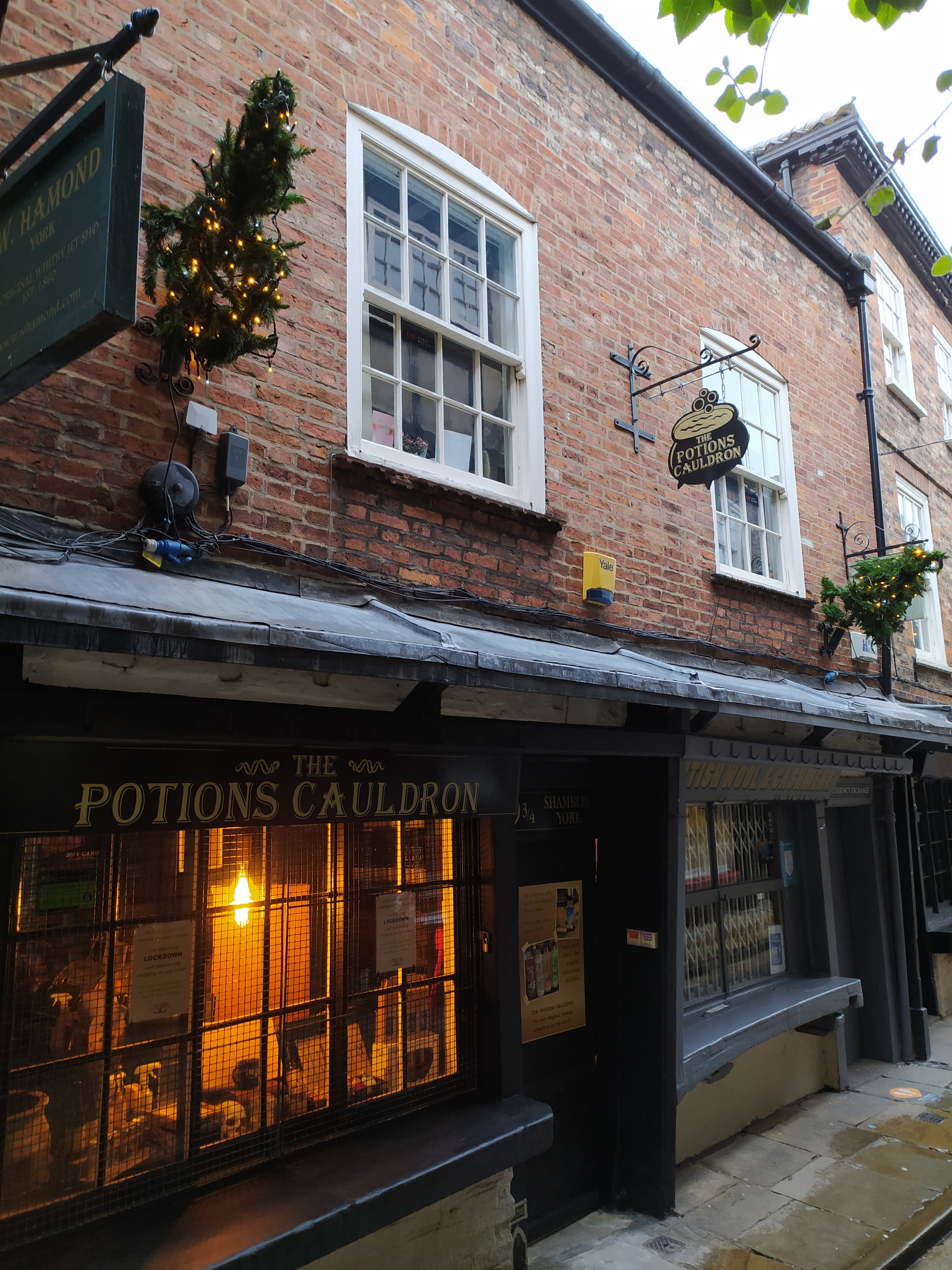
- The buildings in 2020
- Interactive map of the 10–11 The Shambles area

General information
- Location: The Shambles, York, North Yorkshire, England
- Coordinates: 53°57′35″N 1°04′48″W
- Completed: 15th century
- Renovated: Early 18th century (refronted); 20th century (renovated and extended)

Technical details
- Floor count: 2

Design and construction
- Designations

Listed Building – Grade II*
- Official name: 10 and 11, Shambles
- Designated: 14 June 1954
- Reference no.: 1256676

10–11 The Shambles is a historic pair of buildings in York, England. Grade II* listed buildings, they are located on The Shambles.

Originally one building, it was the 16th-century home of Margaret Clitherow, who was executed as a recusant in 1586 and canonised in 1970.

The buildings are two storeys with brick walls at the front and rear (the former rebuilt in the early 1800s). The original building was divided into two tenements around 1730. They were renovated internally around 60 years later, a process that included the installation of two new staircases to the first floor.

The buildings were modernised in 1956, including the removal of two staircases featuring Chinese fret balustrades, but some of the original timber framing still exists. The roof at the rear is partly 15th-century.

As of 2018, the buildings were occupied by The Potions Cauldron (jokingly as 9¾ Shambles, in reference to the Harry Potter series) and British Wool & Cashmere.

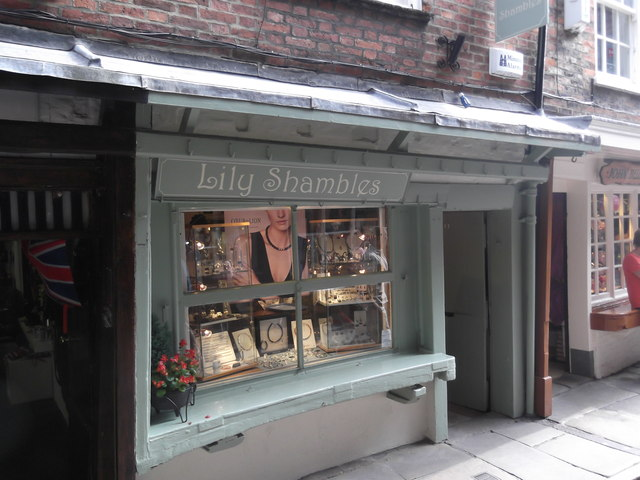
Detail of No. 11 (2014)

== See also ==
- Grade II* listed buildings in the City of York
- Listed buildings in York (within the city walls, northern part)
