= The Shambles =

Street in York, England

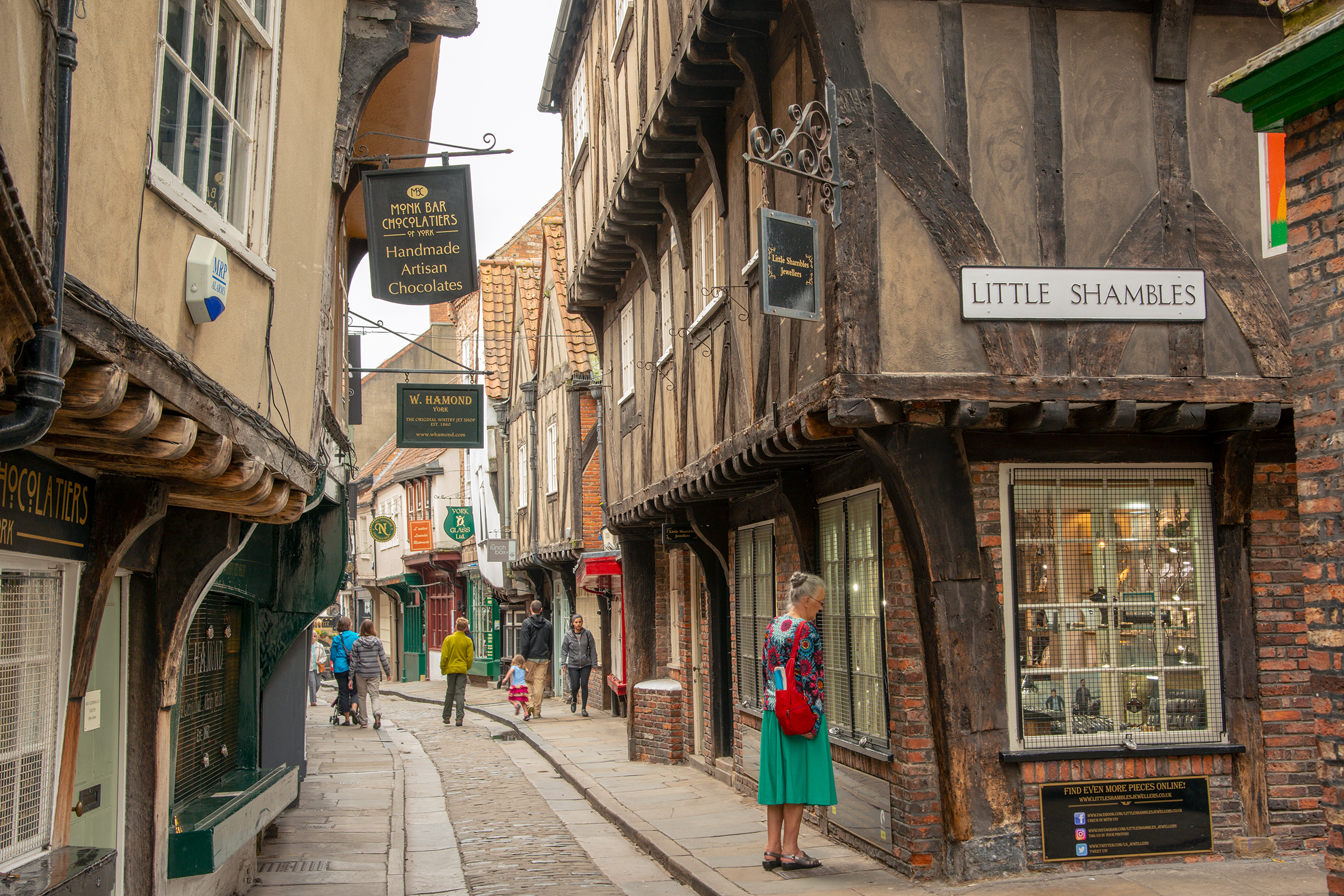
- Looking south from the intersection of Shambles and Little Shambles, 2018
- Location within York
- Former names: Haymongergate; Nedlergate; The Great Flesh Shambles
- Length: 400 ft (120 m)
- Location: York, England
- Coordinates: 53°57′33.85″N 1°4′48.40″W
- North end: Newgate, York
- South end: Pavement, York

The Shambles is a historic street in York, England, featuring preserved medieval buildings, some dating to the 14th century. Running between Newgate in the north and Pavement in the south, the street is narrow, with many timber-framed buildings with jettied floors which overhang the street by several feet. It was once known as the "Great Flesh Shambles", a name reflecting its historical use as a butchers' street. The word shambles derives from Old English sċeamol ("bench, stall"), referring to vendors' or butchers' stalls. In 1885, thirty-one butchers' shops were located along the street, but none remain today.

== Etymology ==
The area around the Shambles was known as Marketshire into the 14th century and included the streets of the Shambles and Pavement. The Shambles itself had several names: by 1240 it was referred to as Haymongergate, and it was called Nedlergate in 1394, both thought to be references to other trades and crafts which took place in the street. By 1426 it had become more commonly known as the "Great Flesh Shambles", a name reflecting its function as a butchers' street, which was eventually shortened to the current name.

== History ==
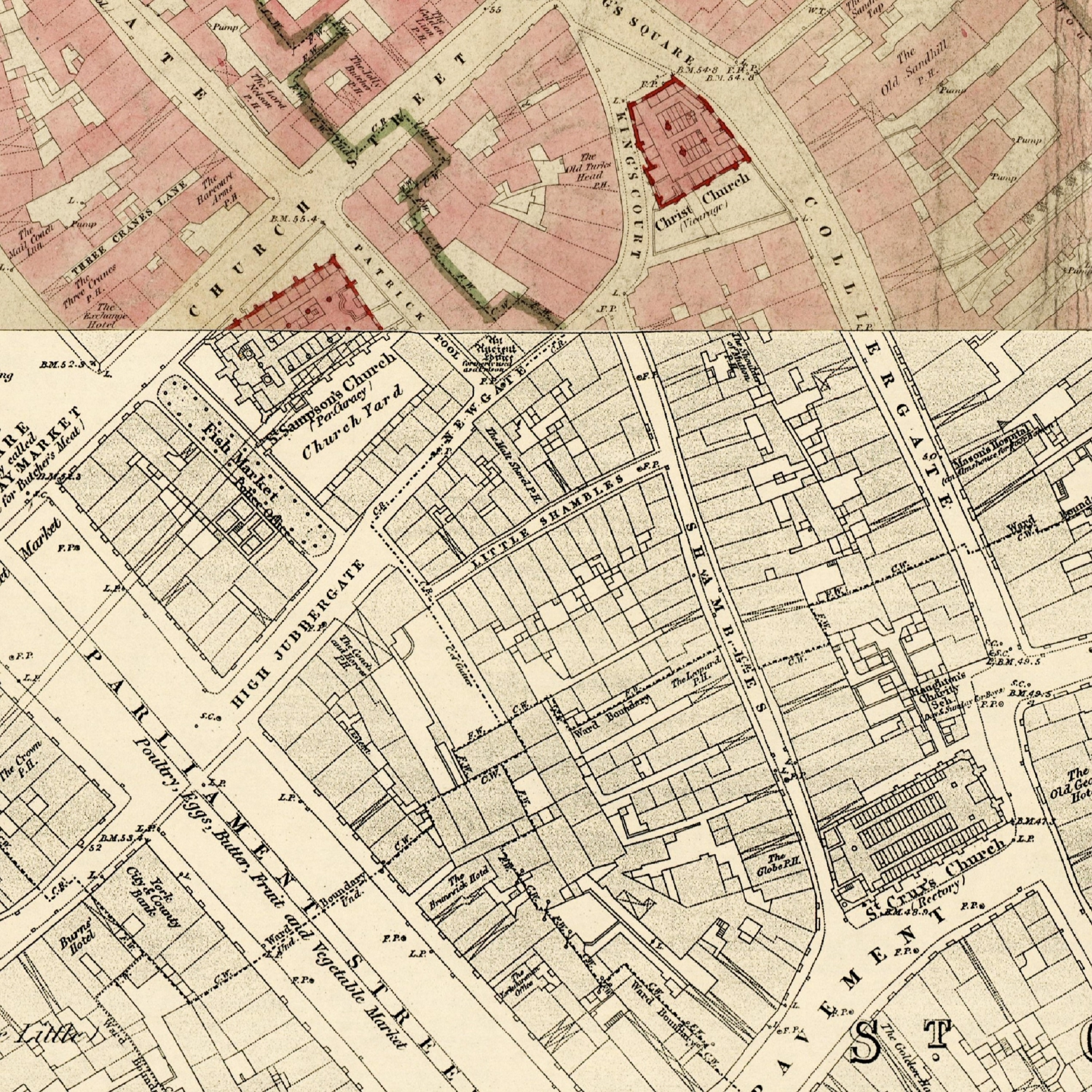
The Shambles on an 1852 map (centre)

Although not named in the Domesday Book of 1086, it has been identified through an entry which lists two butchers' stalls near the church of St Crux (ii bancos in macello nr ecclesiam St Crucis) being in the ownership of the Count of Mortain.

The naming of the street after butcher stalls has remained since the 14th century because the association of the street with butchers has been a large part of its history and character. This was because of a continuous tradition of butchers occupying the street that was upheld for centuries. This is probably in large part due to the favourable architecture of the street towards butcher practices of centuries past. The rears of the shops were slaughterhouses and the fact the buildings shade the narrow street from direct sunlight meant that the meat on display could stay fresh for longer. Also, when butchering took place, the guts, offal, and blood were thrown into the street runnels that had a natural slope which helped it wash away after rain. These butchering practices long predated basic modern standards of hygiene and the street would have been incredibly unhygienic in these days. The last butcher shops on the street closed in the early 20th century and although the butchers have now vanished, a number of the shops on the street still have meat-hooks hanging outside and, below them, shelves on which meat was displayed. The shops include restaurants and shops as well as a bookshop and a bakery.

In medieval times, many streets in York had a similar appearance to the Shambles, such as The Water Lanes. The Shambles preserves a large amount of original medieval-built fabric, with many buildings dating from circa 1350–1475. Along with this, the picturesque qualities of the narrow street with its timber-framed jettied houses have meant that, since as early as the 19th century, it has been recognised as a major attraction of the city of York.

The 1940s and 1950s were a period when the Shambles was subject to a lot of change. After the Second World War, the street was targeted by city planners who wanted to make improvements to the buildings which by that time were in urgent need of restoration. York City Council purchased numerous properties from private owners and, during the 1950s, they extensively altered and rebuilt many buildings and demolished large sections of the area, including the entirety of Little Shambles, a short street that led west off the centre which was considered to be beyond repair. A chapel called Holy Trinity Christ Church was at the heart of King's Square until it was demolished in 1937. Today, some of these restorations are seen as insensitive, since a great deal of historic fabric, including slaughterhouses and outbuildings at the rear of the properties, was demolished. The Yorkshire Architectural and York Archaeological Society's annual report of 1949 contains plans of The Shambles showing the buildings to be removed.

Five "snickelways" lead off the Shambles because they used to be small alleyways in the backs of the buildings, but since these back buildings were demolished in the 1950s, they now open out onto a big open space with market stalls known as Shambles Market. The market was previously known as Newgate Market, after the street on which it is located, but was renamed in 2015.

The Shambles is one of a number of locations, along with streets in Chepstow, Edinburgh, Exeter and London, for which claims have been made to have been the inspiration for Diagon Alley in the Harry Potter franchise. However, the author, J. K. Rowling, has denied this, stating that she had never been to The Shambles. Since 2017, four wizard-themed shops have opened in the street.

== Notable buildings ==
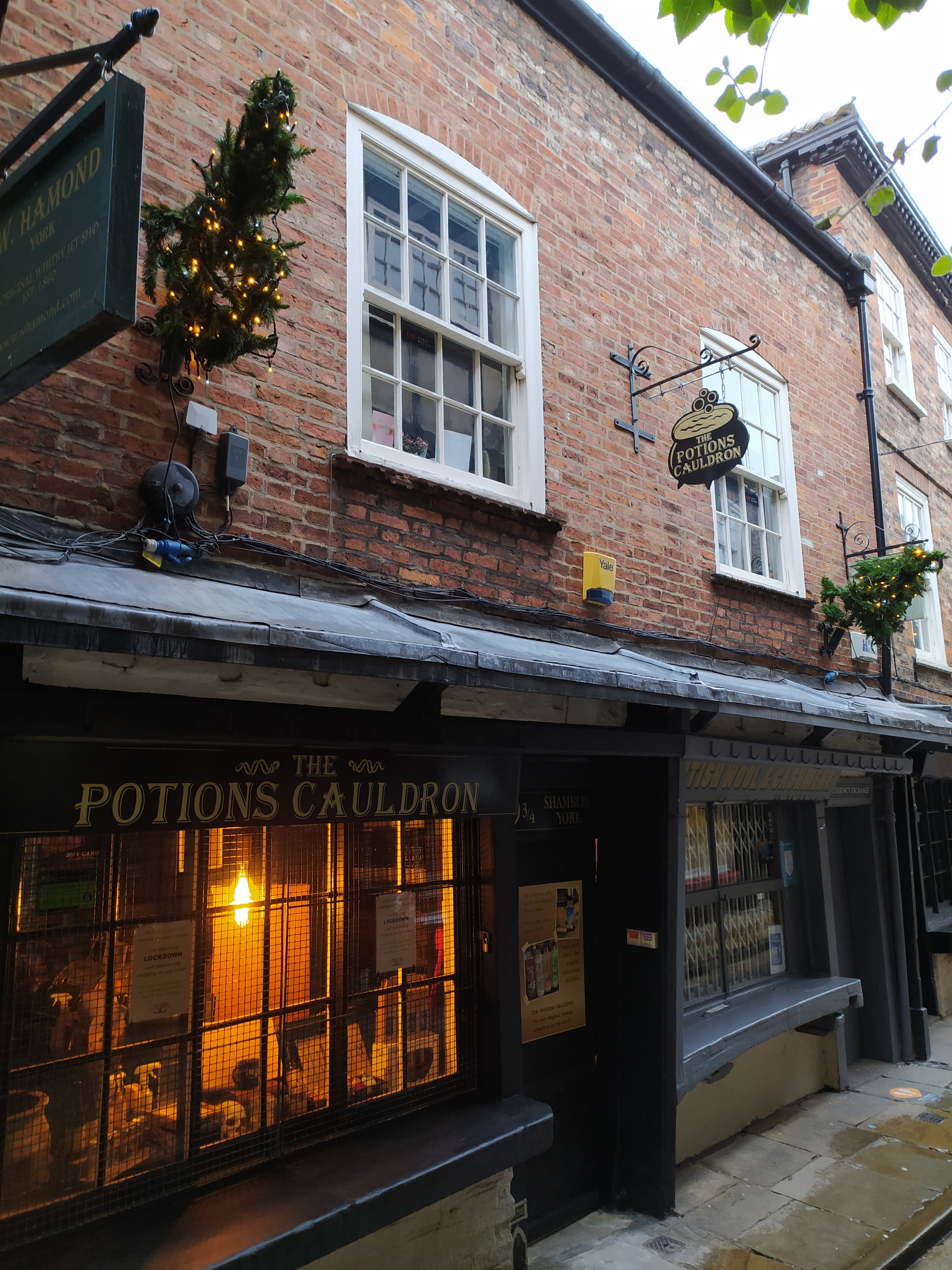
10–11 Shambles, a Grade II* listed building

Almost all the buildings on the street are listed. On the east side, 1 Shambles is timber-framed and probably 14th century; 2 Shambles is early 18th century; and 3–5 Shambles are all 19th century, one of them initially serving as the former Shoulder of Mutton pub. 6 Shambles is late 18th century, with a 20th-century renovation and shopfront. 7–8 Shambles are late and early 15th century respectively, and 9 Shambles is also 15th century. 10–11 Shambles originated as a single 15th-century house, and 12 Shambles has some parts probably dating from the 14th century. 13 Shambles is early 17th century, while 14 Shambles was originally timber-framed but is of unclear date. 19 Shambles was built in the early 16th century; 20 Shambles is mid-18th century; and 21 Shambles and 22–23 Shambles were each built in the early 18th century. At the end of the street is the parish room of St Crux.

On the west side, 27–28 Shambles were built in the early 19th century; 30 Shambles is 18th-century but was largely rebuilt in 1952; and 31–33 Shambles were built as a terrace in about 1436.

Among the structures of The Shambles is a shrine to Saint Margaret Clitherow, who was married to a butcher who owned and lived in a shop on the street. Her home is thought to have been 10 Shambles, on the opposite side of the street from the shrine at number 35, which has a priest-hole fireplace. These are also listed. 37–38 Shambles are late 15th century, and 39 Shambles includes a 15th-century timber frame. 40 Shambles is early 18th century; 41–42 Shambles is 15th century; and 43 Shambles was built in 1775. 44 Shambles is 15th century; 45 Shambles is early 18th century; and 46–47 Shambles were built in about 1740.

== Gallery ==
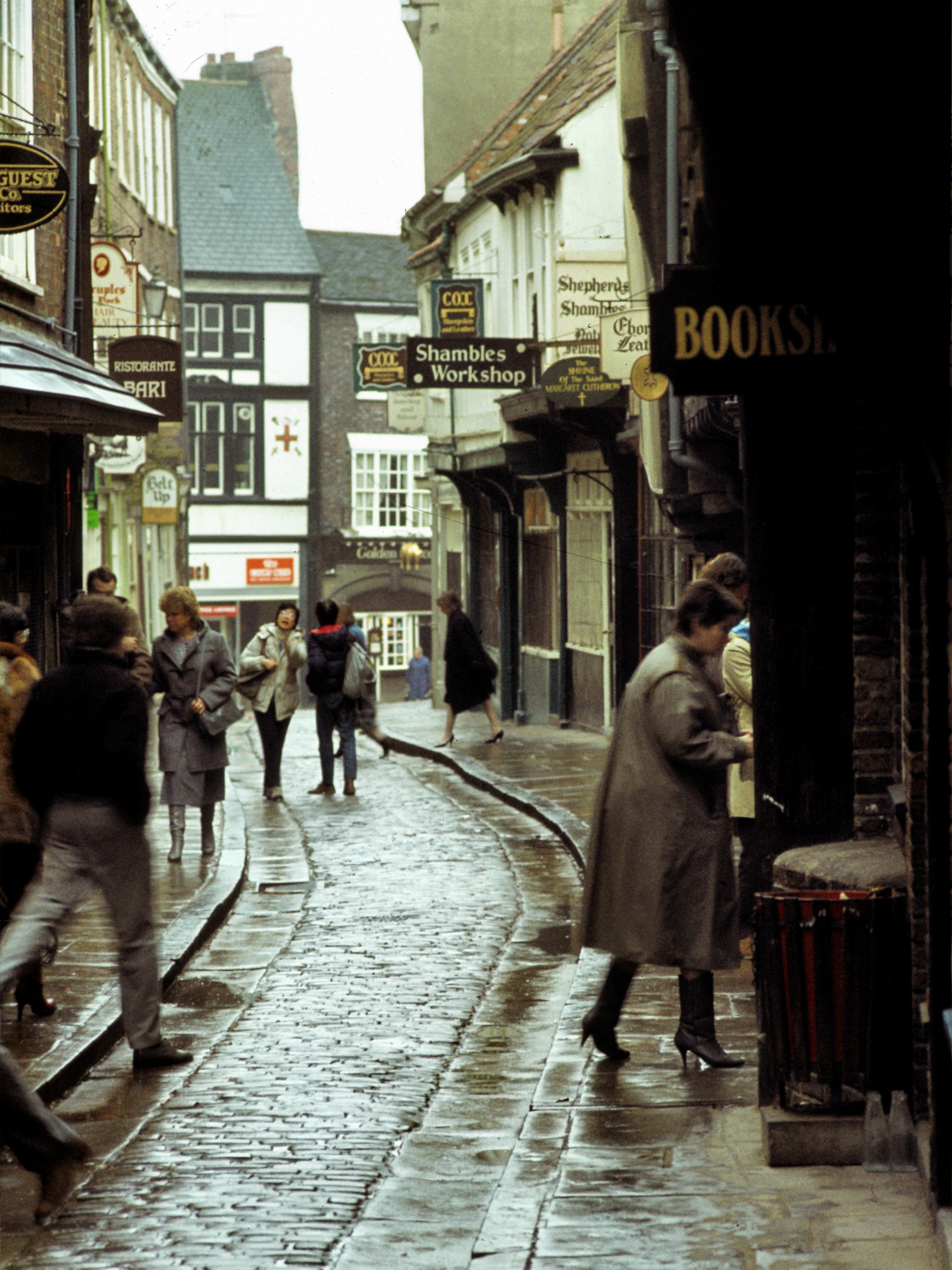
A view looking south towards Pavement, 1985

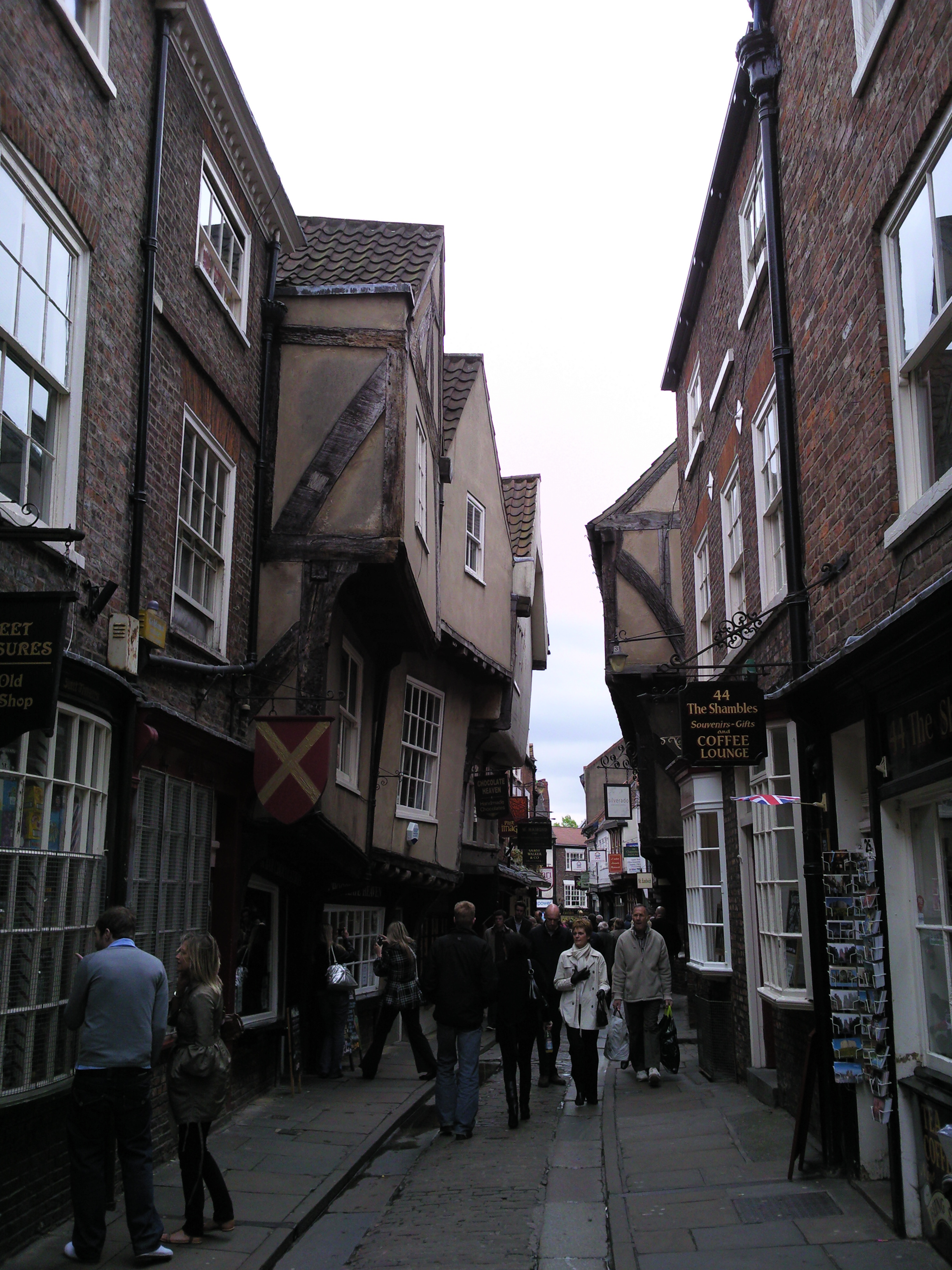
Jettied buildings overhang the street by several feet

The Shambles is now a tourist destination, 2026

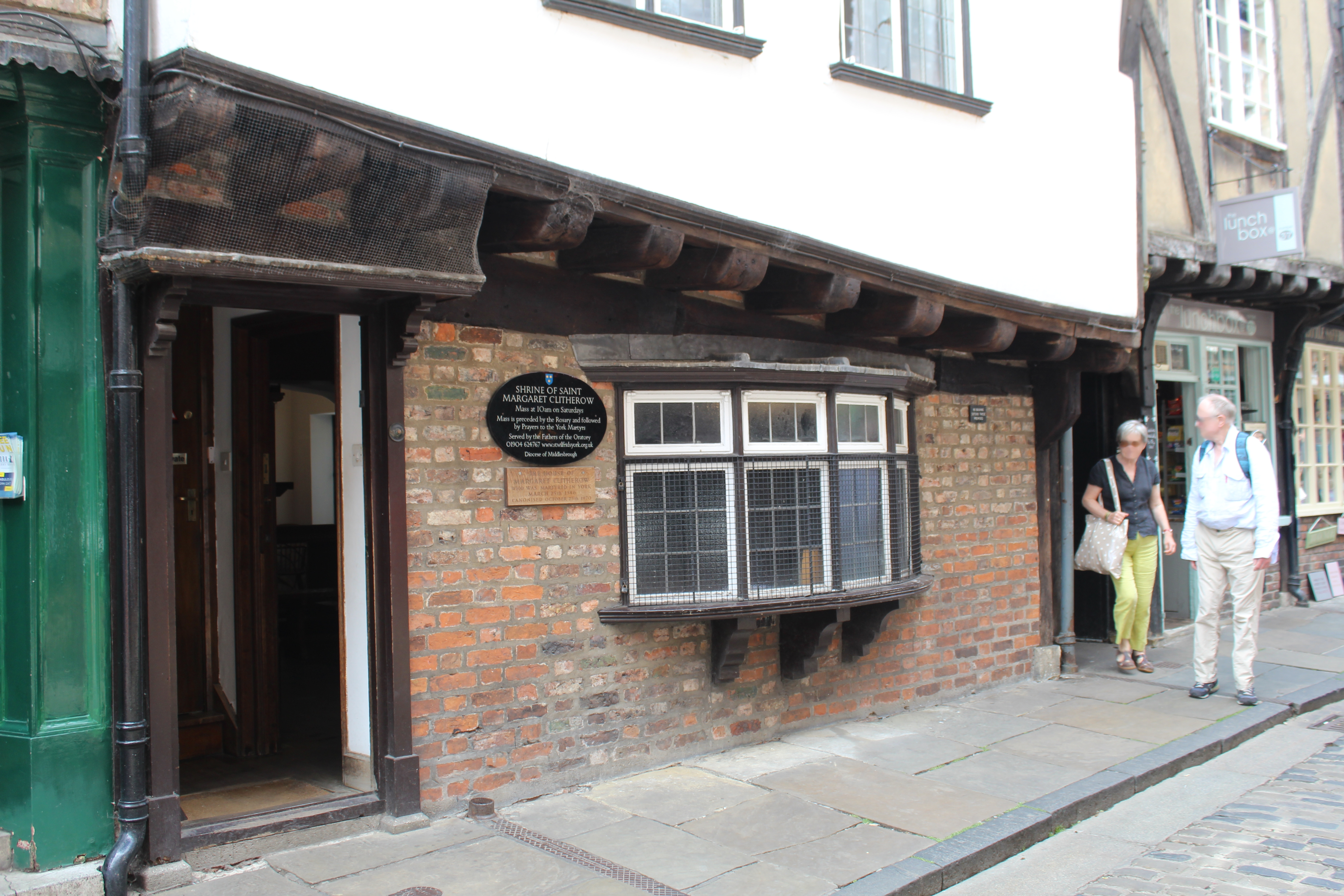
The shrine to Saint Margaret Clitherow, 2018

== See also ==
- List of butcher shops

== Sources ==
- Pevsner, Nikolaus; revised by Neave, David (1995) [1972]. The Buildings of England Yorkshire: York and the East Riding (2nd ed.). Harmondsworth: Penguin Books. ISBN 978-0-14-071061-8.
