= St Crux Church, York =

Listed building in York, England

St Crux
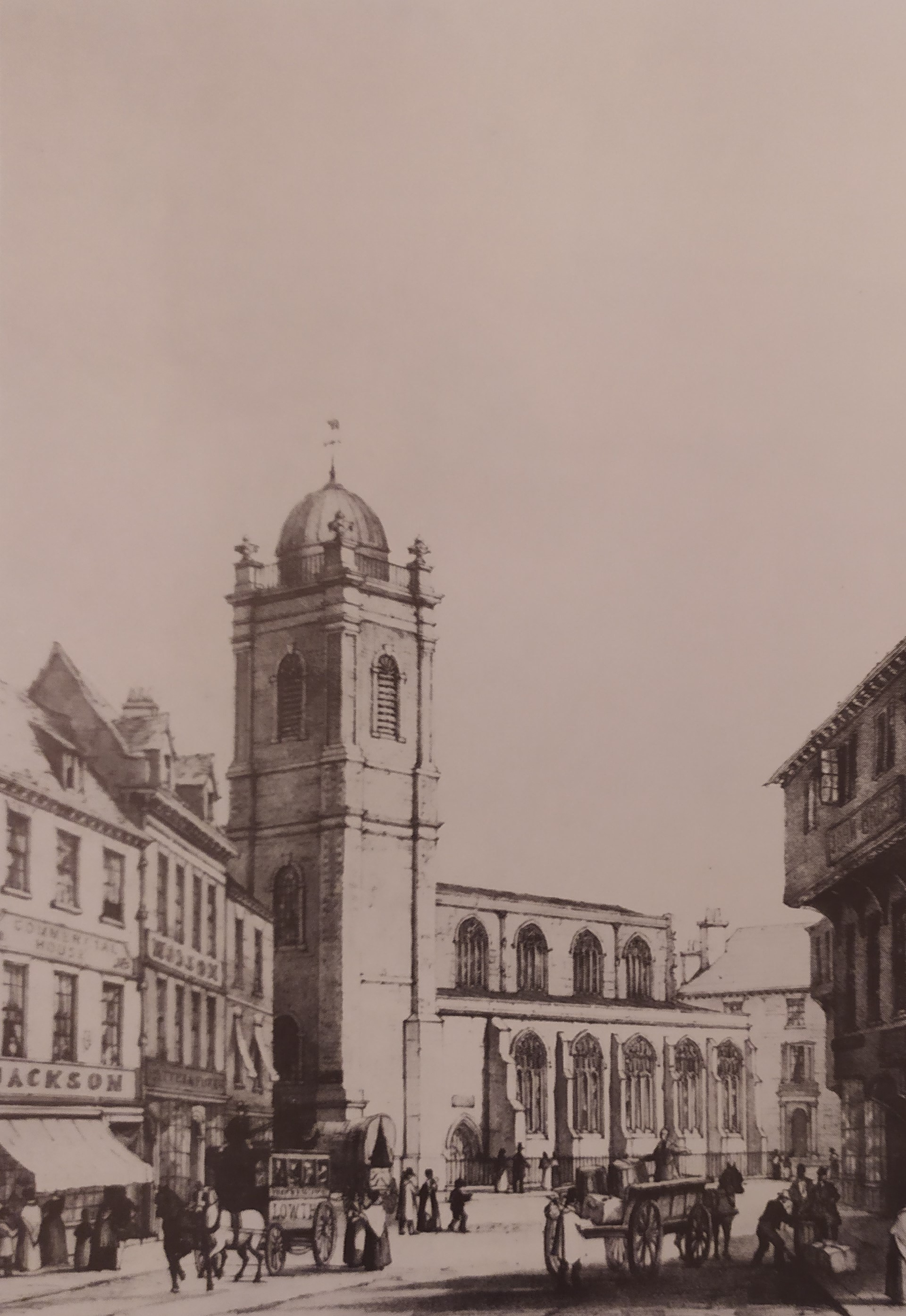
- St Crux in about 1843

- Location within York City Centre

General information
- Location: Pavement, York, England
- Coordinates: 53°57′33″N 1°04′46″W
- Year built: 1888

Design and construction
- Designations

Listed Building – Grade II*
- Official name: Parish room of St Crux and wall attached to north west corner
- Designated: 14 June 1954
- Reference no.: 1256664

St Crux is a parish hall in the city of York, England, which incorporates the remains of a medieval church.

== History ==
The building is on Pavement, although it is entered from The Shambles, while it backs onto Whip-Ma-Whop-Ma-Gate.

St Crux was first mentioned in the Domesday Book, at which time it belonged to the Count of Mortain, later passing to St Mary's Abbey. The church was rebuilt between 1402 and 1424, incorporating a Saxon carved stone into the north wall. The tower was rebuilt from 1697, and Francis Drake described the Italianate tower as "a handsome new steeple of brick coined with stone". Although the church was regarded as one of the finest in the city, by the 19th century, it was in a poor condition, and it was closed in 1880; the parish was soon merged into that of All Saints' Church. Fisher and Hepper drew up plans in 1884 to restore the church, but it was instead demolished three years later, over the objections of the Society for the Protection of Ancient Buildings. Despite the poor condition of the tower, it proved sturdy enough that it had to be dynamited. The Press has described it as "perhaps the most famous" lost church of York.

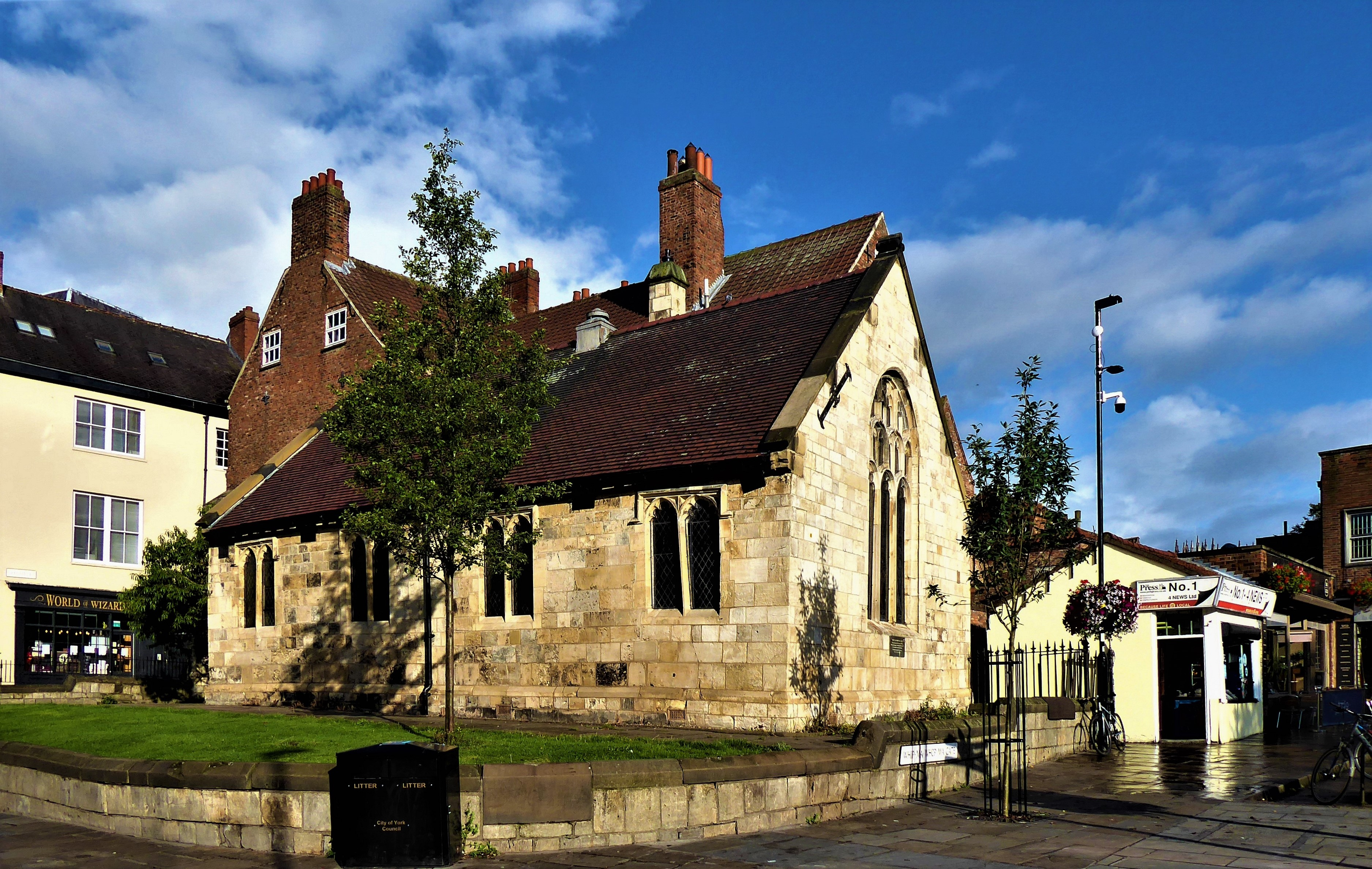
St Crux Parish Hall

In 1888, a parish hall was built on the site of St Crux, reusing materials from the church, including much of its north wall, and the Perpendicular east window. Inside are many of the monuments and fixtures from the former church. Burials include Thomas Percy, 7th Earl of Northumberland, Sir Thomas Herbert, and two Lord Mayors of York: Thomas Bowes and Robert Welles.

Location within York

The building was Grade II* listed in 1954. It is used as a tea room, and for charity markets.

== See also ==
- Grade II* listed buildings in the City of York
- Listed buildings in York (within the city walls, northern part)
