= Margaret Clitherow =

English saint and martyr (1556–1586)

Saint Margaret Clitherow
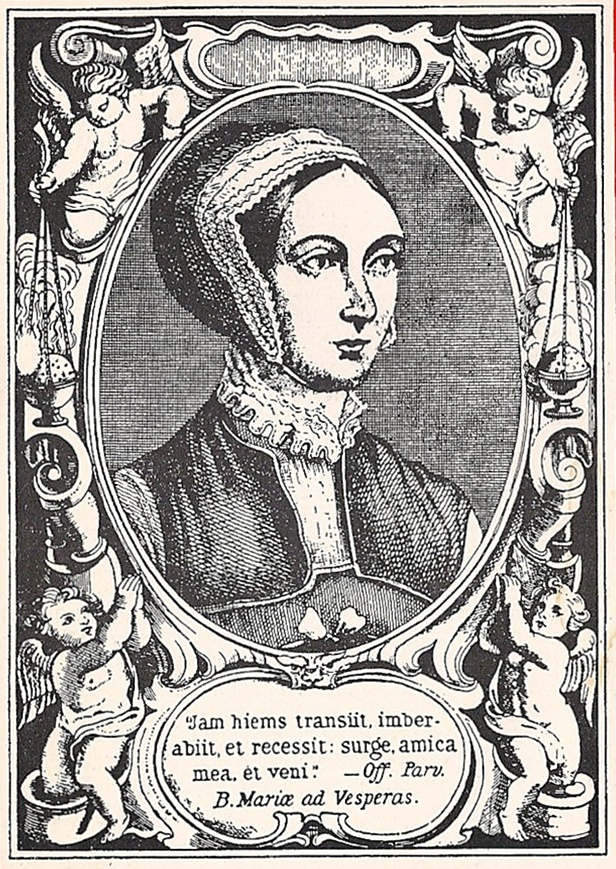

One of the Forty Martyrs of England and Wales
- Born: c. 1556; York, Yorkshire, England
- Residence: York, Yorkshire, England
- Died: 25 March 1586 (aged 29–30); York, Yorkshire, England
- Cause of death: pressed to death under 7 or 8 hundredweight
- Venerated in: Roman Catholic Church; Anglican Communion
- Beatified: 15 December 1929 by Pope Pius XI
- Canonized: 25 October 1970 by Pope Paul VI
- Major shrine: The Shambles, York, North Yorkshire, England
- Feast: 25 October (together with the Forty Martyrs of England and Wales, in Wales) 4 May (together with the Forty Martyrs of England and Wales, in England) 30 August (together with Anne Line and Margaret Ward) 27 February (together with Anne Line and Margaret Ward in the Diocese of Nottingham)
- Attributes: Door, Bible, martyr's palm, rosary
- Patronage: Businesswomen, converts, martyrs, Catholic Women's League, Latin Mass Society

Margaret Clitherow (née Middleton, c. 1556 – 25 March 1586) was an English Catholic recusant known as The Pearl of York. She was pressed to death for refusing to enter a plea to the charge of harbouring Catholic priests. She was canonised in 1970 by Pope Paul VI.

== Life ==
Margaret Clitherow was born in 1556, the youngest child of Thomas and Jane Middleton née Turner. Her father, a respected freeman, was a businessman who worked as a wax-chandler. He also held the office of Sheriff of York, in 1564, and was churchwarden of St Martin's Church, Coney Street between 1555 and 1558. He died when Margaret was fourteen.

On 1 July 1571, she married John Clitherow, a wealthy butcher and chamberlain of the city, who was also a widower with two sons. She gave birth to three children, and the family lived at today's 10–11 The Shambles.

She converted to Roman Catholicism in 1574. Although her husband, John Clitherow, belonged to the Established Church, he was supportive as his brother William was a Roman Catholic priest. He paid her fines for not attending church services. She was first imprisoned in 1577 for failing to attend church, and two more incarcerations at York Castle followed. Her third child, William, was born in prison and she learned to read and write while incarcerated.

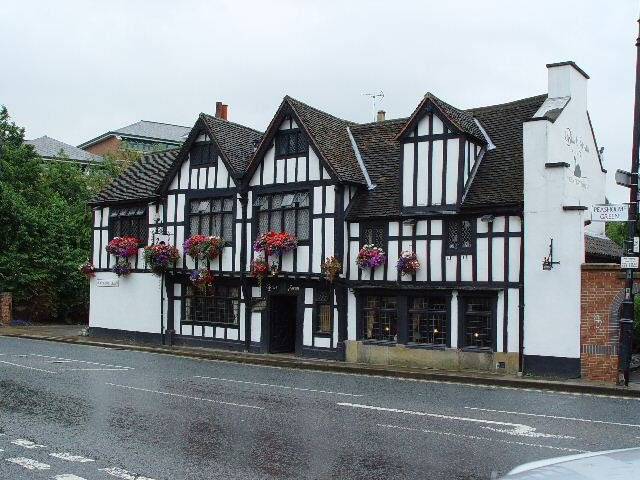
The Black Swan, Peasholme Green, York

Margaret risked her life by harbouring and maintaining priests, which was made a capital offence by the Jesuits, etc. Act 1584. She provided two chambers, one adjoining her house and, with her house under surveillance, she rented a house some distance away, where she kept priests hidden and Mass was celebrated through the thick of the persecution. Her home became one of the most important hiding places for fugitive priests in the north of England. Local tradition holds that she also housed her clerical guests in The Black Swan at Peasholme Green, where the Queen's agents were lodged.

She sent her eldest son, Henry, to the English College, relocated in Reims, France, to train for the priesthood. Her husband was summoned by the authorities to explain why his eldest son had gone abroad. On 10 March 1586 the Clitherow house was searched. A frightened boy revealed the location of the priest hole.

Margaret was arrested and called before the York assizes for the crime of harbouring Catholic priests. She refused to plead, thereby preventing a trial that would entail her three children being made to testify, and being subjected to torture. She was sentenced to death.

Although pregnant with her fourth child, she was executed on Lady Day, 1586, (which also happened to be Good Friday that year) in the Toll Booth at Ouse Bridge, York, by being crushed to death (peine forte et dure), the standard inducement to force a plea.

The two sergeants who should have carried out the execution hired four desperate beggars to do it instead. She was stripped and had a handkerchief tied across her face. She was then laid across a sharp rock the size of a man's fist. The door from her own house was put on top of her and loaded with 7 or 8 hundredweight of rocks and stones, so that the sharp rock would break her back. Her death occurred within fifteen minutes, but her body was left for six hours before the weight was removed. Her body was buried secretly in accordance with Catholic rites.

After the execution, John Clitherow remarried for a third time and remained a Protestant.

== Veneration ==
Clitherow's life was recorded in John Mush's Trewe Reporte of the Lyfe and Marterdome of Mrs Margarete Clitherowe, which he wrote within three months of her death. The English poet and Jesuit priest Gerard Manley Hopkins wrote a poem honouring "God's daughter Margaret Clitheroe." The poem, entitled "Margaret Clitheroe" was among fragments and unfinished poems of Hopkins discovered after his death and has been called "a tribute to the woman, to her faith and courage, and to the manner of her death".

Clitherow was beatified in 1929 by Pope Pius XI and canonised on 25 October 1970 by Pope Paul VI among the Forty Martyrs of England and Wales. Their feast day in the current Roman Catholic calendar is 4 May in England and 25 October in Wales. She is also commemorated in England on 30 August, along with martyrs Anne Line and Margaret Ward. The three were officially added to the Episcopal Church liturgical calendar with a feast day on 30 August.

A relic, said to be her hand, is housed in the Bar Convent in York.

St. Margaret's Shrine is at 35–36 The Shambles. John Clitherow had his butcher's shop at 35. However, the street was re-numbered in the 18th century, so it is thought their house was actually opposite.

== Legacy ==
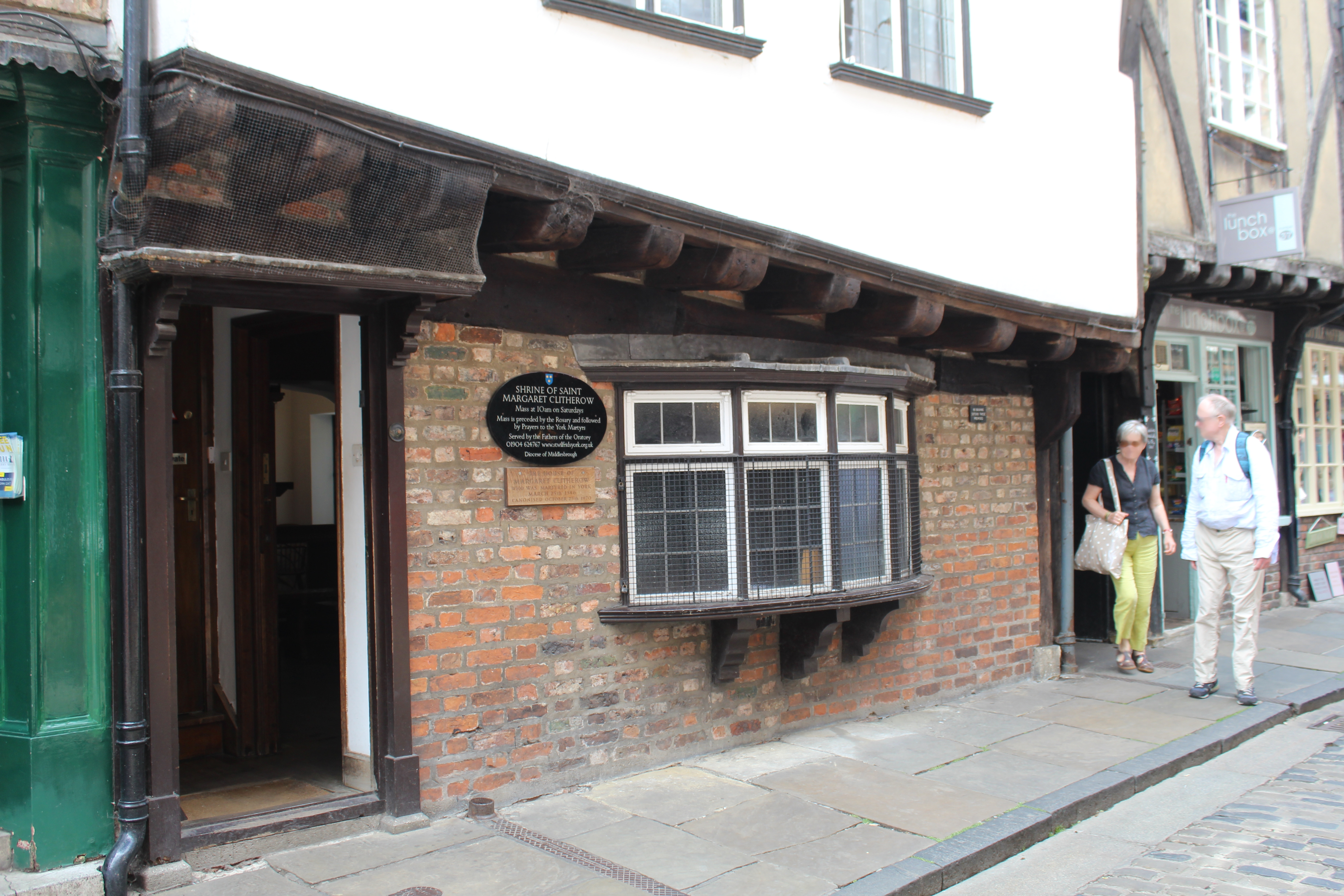
The shrine to Saint Margaret on The Shambles, York, 2018

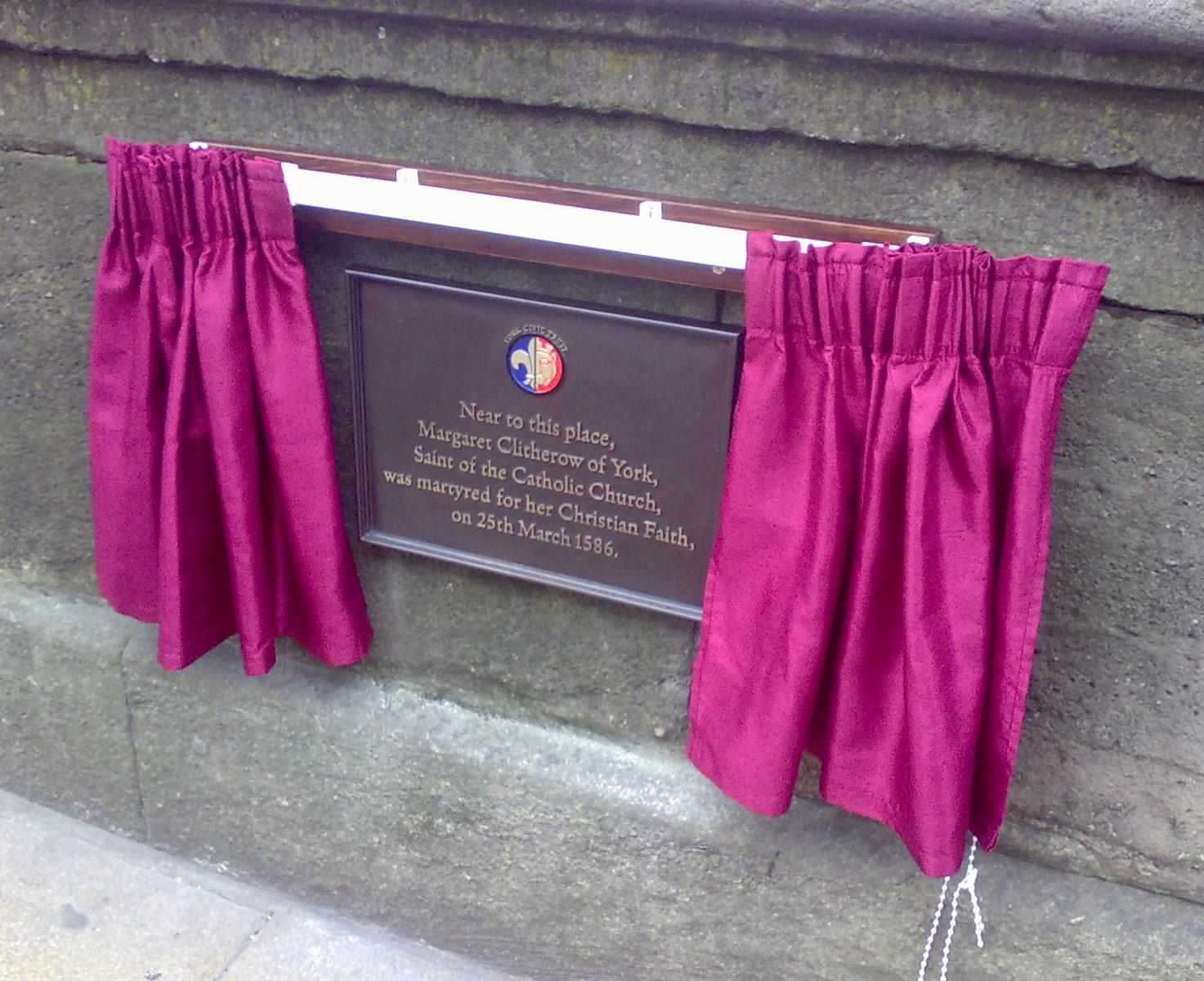
Commemorative plaque on the Ouse Bridge, York

Margaret Clitherow is the patroness of the Catholic Women's League.

Several schools in England are named after her, including those in Bracknell, Brixham, Manchester, Middlesbrough, Thamesmead SE28, Brent, London NW10 and Tonbridge. The Roman Catholic primary school in Nottingham's Bestwood estate is named after Clitherow. Another school named after her is St Margaret Clitherow RC Primary School, located next to Stevenage Borough Football Club.

The York Catholic secondary school, All Saints, has a form named after the martyr. As it shares its chapel with the Bar Convent also houses her left hand, the school was the first English school founded exclusively to educate Catholic girls. It fulfils St Margaret Clitherow's ambition to educate in the word of God, as she associated with the virtue of truth.

In the United States, St Margaret of York Church and School in Loveland, a suburb of Cincinnati, Ohio, is also named after her.

She is a co-patroness of the Latin Mass Society, which organises an annual pilgrimage to York in her honour. A group of parishes in the Roman Catholic Archdiocese of Liverpool, Sacred Heart in Hindsford, St Richard's in Atherton, Holy Family in Boothstown, St Ambrose Barlow in Astley, St Gabriel's and Higher Folds in Leigh are now united as a single community with St Margaret Clitherow as its patron. The former parishes of Sacred Heart and Holy Family in Rochdale in the Diocese of Salford have also been united under the patronage of St Margaret.

In 2008, a commemorative plaque was installed at the Micklegate end of York's Ouse Bridge to mark the site of her martyrdom. The Bishop of Middlesbrough unveiled it in a ceremony on 29 August 2008.

Clitherow is the subject of the play Design for a Stained Glass Window by William Berney and Howard Richardson, which played briefly on Broadway in 1950. Martha Scott played Clitherow, with Charlton Heston as her husband and Charles Nolte as her brother-in-law William.

== See also ==
- Bar Convent
- Forty Martyrs of England and Wales
