= Whip-Ma-Whop-Ma-Gate =

Street in York, England

Coordinates: 53.959180°N 1.079240°W

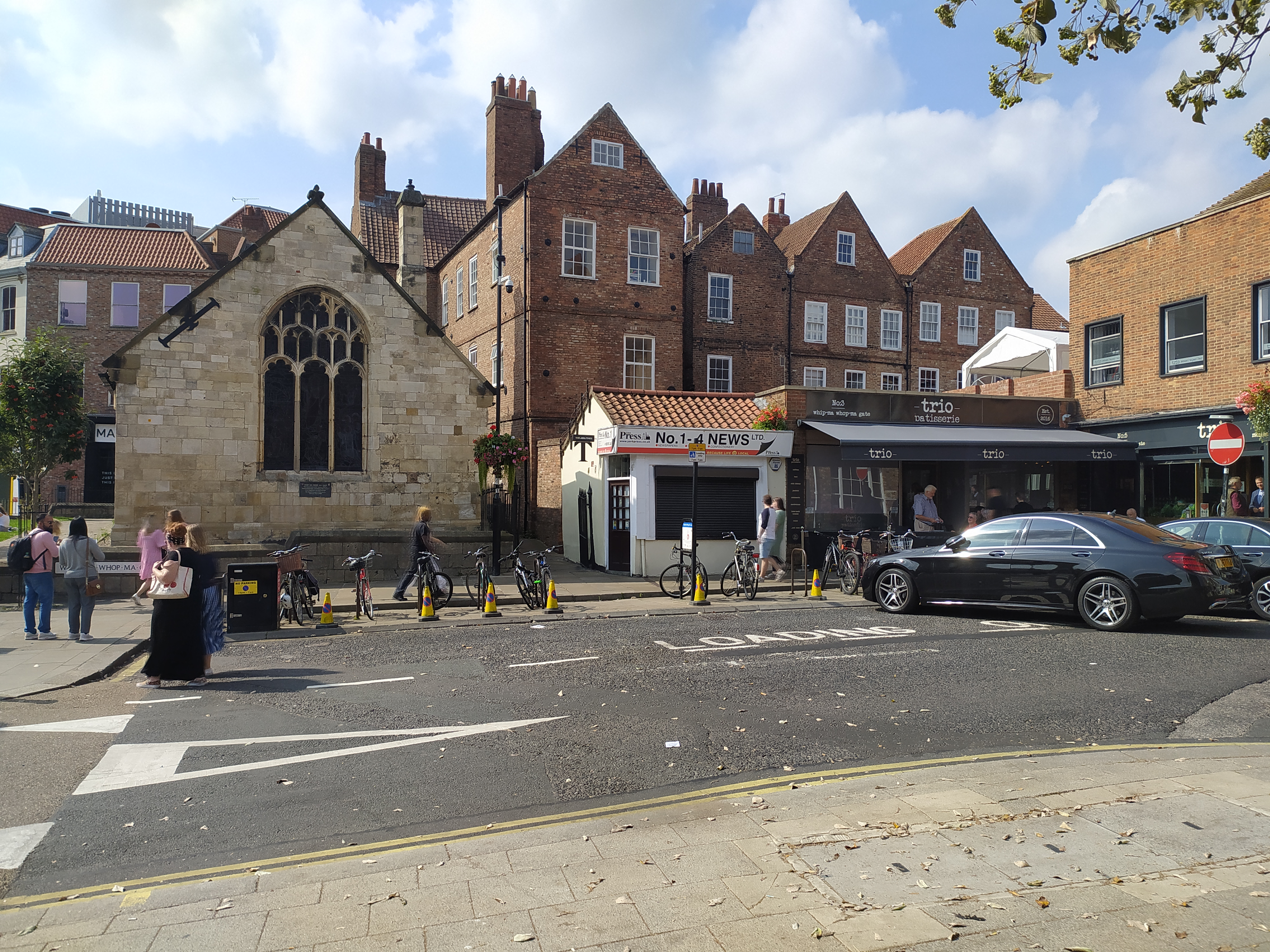
The entire length of the street, seen from the eastern side

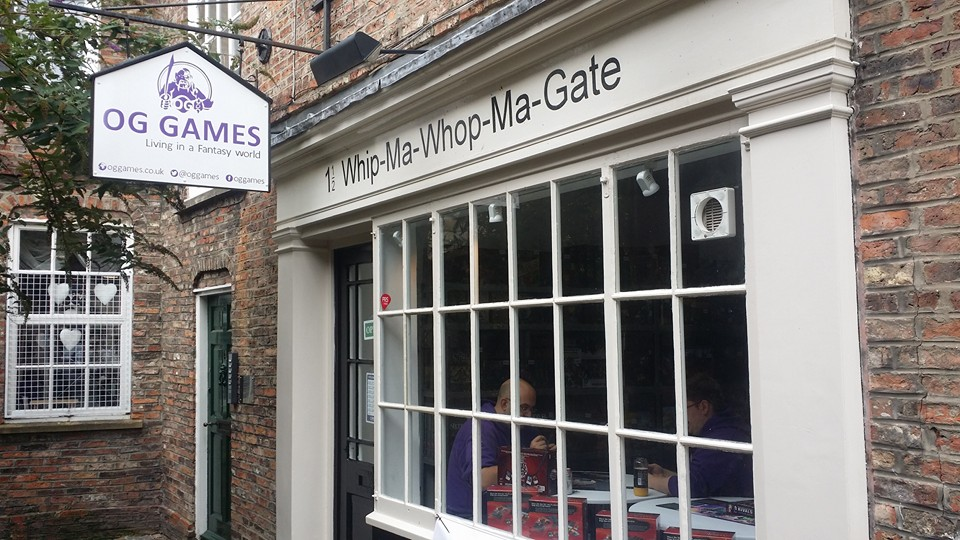
No. 1 1/2 Whip-Ma-Whop-Ma-Gate

Whip-Ma-Whop-Ma-Gate is a street in York, England, known for its short length and unusual name. A continuation of Colliergate, it runs south to meet Pavement, Fossgate, and the Stonebow, a distance of perhaps 80 feet (24 m), and is adjoined by St Saviourgate on its eastern side. St Crux Parish Hall, originally one of York's medieval churches, backs onto it.

The street's name was first recorded in 1505 as Whitnourwhatnourgate, and later appears as Whitney Whatneygate. It seems to mean "neither-one-thing-nor-the-other street", although a plaque on the end of the parish hall suggests the meaning "what a street!". In 17th and 18th century documents, the alternative name Salvey Rents or Salvegate is also found.

Whip-Ma-Whop-Ma is the title of a novel by York author Martyn Clayton.
