= English Martyrs Church =

English Martyrs Church may refer to:

- English Martyrs' Catholic Church, Goring-by-Sea, West Sussex, England
- English Martyrs Church, Tower Hill, London, England
- English Martyrs' Church, Wallasey, Merseyside, England
- English Martyrs Church, York, England

== See also ==
- Church of St Thomas of Canterbury and the English Martyrs, Preston, Lancashire, England
- Our Lady and the English Martyrs Church, Cambridge, England
- St Austin's and English Martyrs Parish, Wakefield
