= St Chad's Church, York =

Listed church in York, England

St Chad's Church
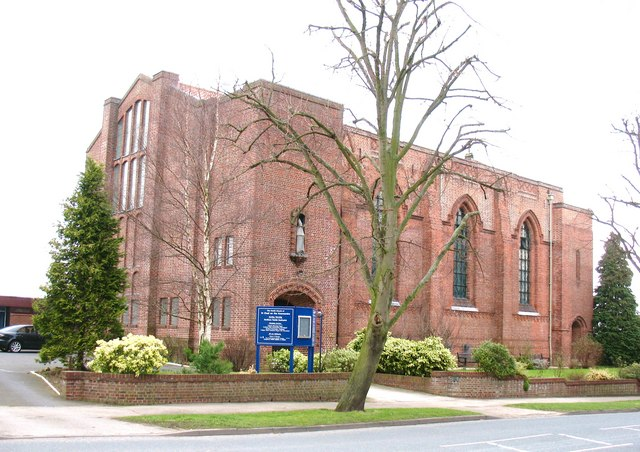
- The church in 2009
- St Chad's Church
- 53.94348°N 1.09088°W
- OS grid reference: SE 59778 50091
- Location: Campleshon Road, South Bank, York
- Country: England
- Denomination: Church of England
- Website: stchadsyork.org

History
- Status: Active
- Dedication: Chad of Mercia
- Consecrated: 1966

Architecture
- Heritage designation: Grade II listed
- Architect(s): Walter Brierley, Francis Johnson
- Style: Gothic Revival
- Groundbreaking: 1925; 101 years ago
- Completed: 1966; 60 years ago

Specifications
- Materials: Brick, concrete

Administration
- Province: York
- Diocese: York
- Archdeaconry: York
- Deanery: York

St Chad's Church, sometimes known as St Chad on the Knavesmire, is a parish church on Campleshon Road in the South Bank area of York, England.

In the early 20th century, the South Bank area fell within the parish of St Clement's Church, but it had a small mission church on South Bank Avenue. A new church building on Campleshon Road was planned as a memorial to G. Argles, rector of St Clement's, and was designed by Walter Brierley. Construction began in 1925 but was left unfinished when Brierley died the following year. A vestry was added in 1928, when the church was given its own parish. The building was finally completed by Francis Johnson in 1966, with only about half the original plan having been constructed. The building was Grade II listed in 2004.

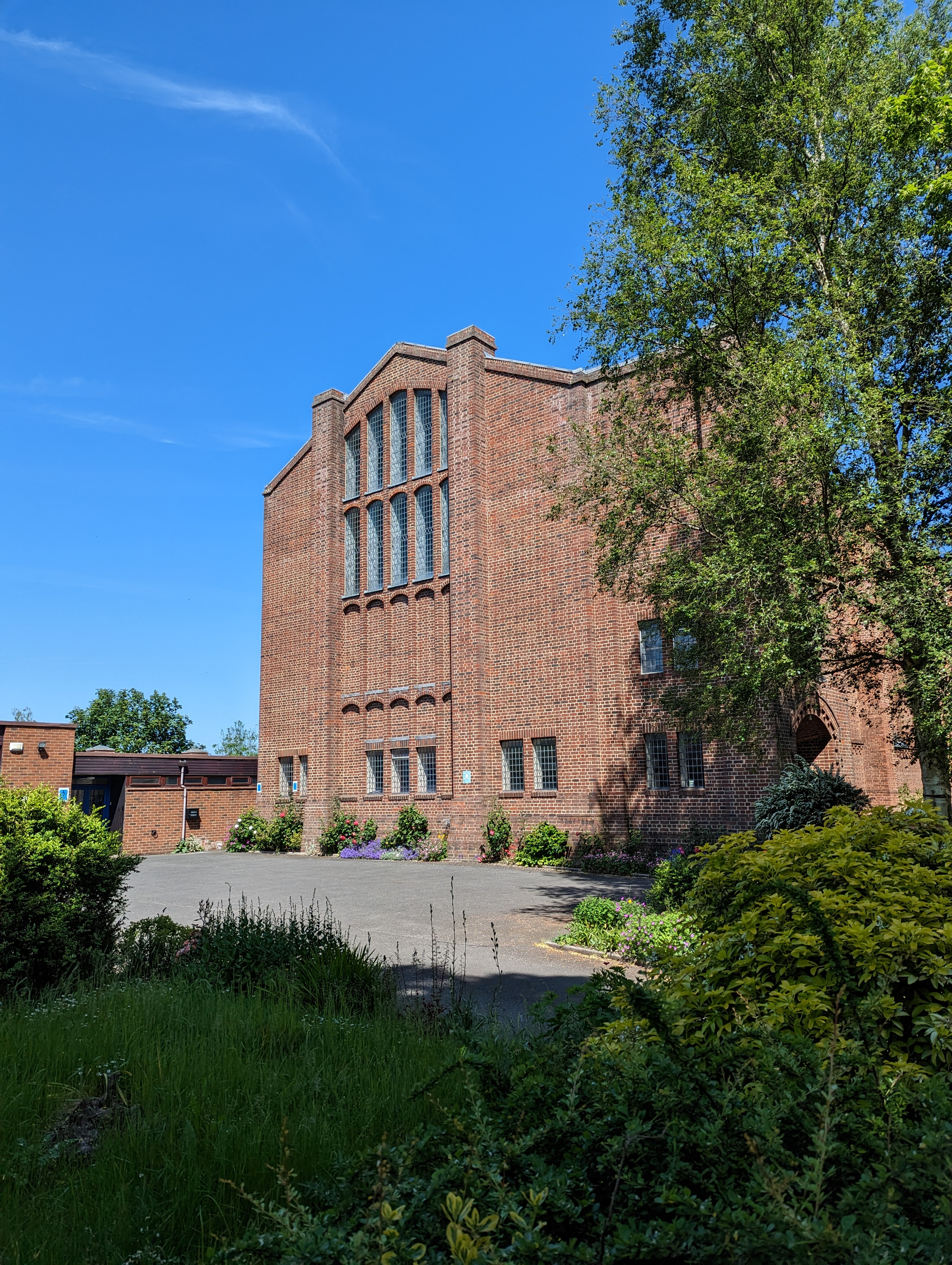
West end of the church, in 2023

The building is constructed of concrete, with brick facades and a concrete roof vault. The main part of the church consists of a single space serving as both nave and chancel, with side aisles, a narthex at the west end with stairs leading to an organ gallery, and a chapel at the east end. There is a tower at the north-west, incorporating a porch. The tower has a flat roof and has a brick niche containing a statue of Saint Chad. Externally, the building is divided into bays by full-height buttresses, and the walls are topped with a parapet of moulded brick. There is a priest's doorway at the south-east corner, with its own small tower. The windows are lancets, arranged in multiple tiers at the west end.

Inside, the nave and chancel are divided by a screen with piers that support a piscina and an aumbry. The pulpit is hexagonal and was constructed in 1940.

== See also ==
- Listed buildings in York (outside the city walls, southern part)
