= St Edward the Confessor's Church, Dringhouses =

Listed church in York, England

St Edward the Confessor's Church
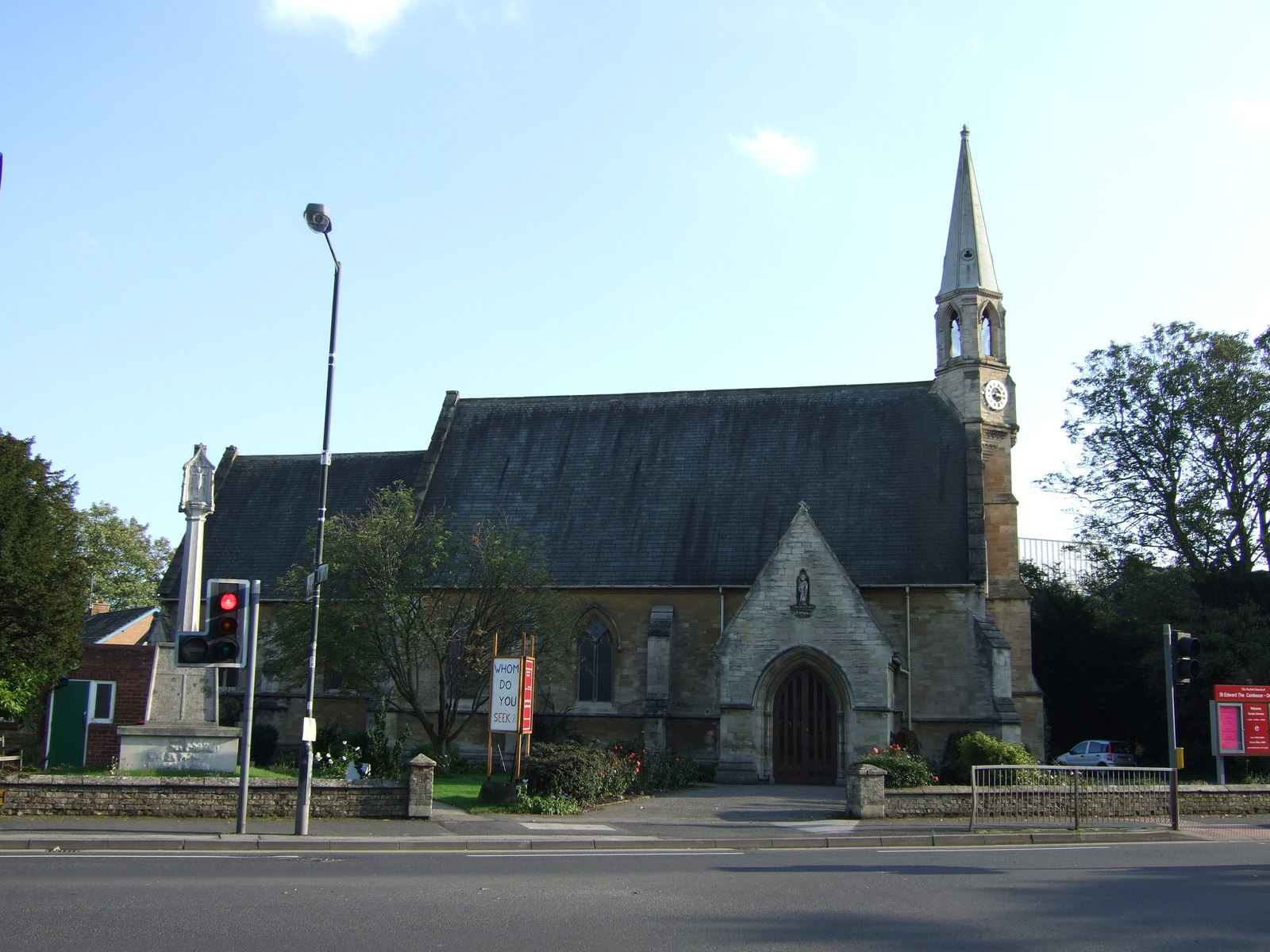
- The church in 2021
- St Edward the Confessor's Church
- 53.94002°N 1.10619°W
- OS grid reference: SE 58771 49689
- Location: Tadcaster Road, Dringhouses, York
- Country: England
- Denomination: Church of England
- Website: stedsdringhouses.org

History
- Status: Active
- Dedication: Edward the Confessor
- Consecrated: 1849; 177 years ago

Architecture
- Heritage designation: Grade II listed
- Architect(s): Vickers and Hugall
- Style: Gothic Revival
- Groundbreaking: 1847

Specifications
- Materials: Limestone

Administration
- Province: York
- Diocese: York
- Archdeaconry: York
- Deanery: York

St Edward the Confessor's Church is an Anglican church on Tadcaster Road in Dringhouses, a suburb of York, England.

During the medieval period, Dringhouses lay within the parish of Holy Trinity Church, Micklegate, although local parishioners preferred to worship at St Stephen's Church, Acomb, which was closer. Around 1472, a chapel dedicated to Saint Helen was built in the village, on the site later occupied by the library. It was demolished in 1725, and a new chapel was constructed on the opposite side of the main road; only its foundations survive. Between 1847 and 1849, the present church was built immediately south-west of its predecessor. Designed by Vickers and Hugall, it was intended to resemble the Church of St Mary and St Nicholas, Littlemore, reflecting the Oxford Movement sympathies of its benefactor, Mrs Trafford Leigh. An organ was installed in 1868, and a chancel screen designed by C. Hodgson Fowler in 1892. The vestry was enlarged in 1902, and the spire was removed and replaced with a fibreglass replica in 1970. The building was Grade II listed in 1983.

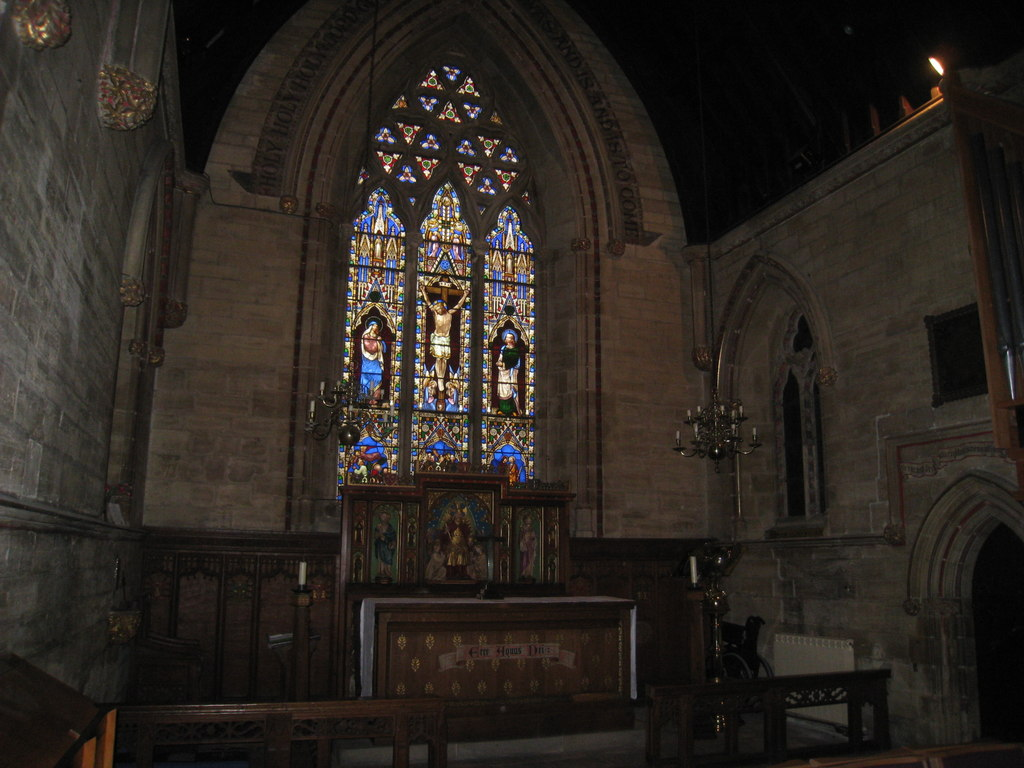
The chancel in 2012

The church is built of limestone with green slate roofs. It consists of a four-bay nave, a lower chancel and a north porch. The west wall has diagonal buttresses and a central buttress flanked by two-light geometrical windows. At the gable stands a four-sided bell turret, set diagonally, with a clock facing north-west and pointed bell openings above. The porch contains a statue of Edward the Confessor. The interior is painted and gilded, with a floor of Minton tiles.

Inside, the octagonal stone pulpit and font survive, along with wooden pews and choir stalls. The stained glass is by William Wailes. In the vestry is a white and grey marble monument to Samuel Francis Barlow, dating from 1800, which was moved from the earlier chapel.

== See also ==
- Listed buildings in York (outside the city walls, southern part)
