= York City Arms Sports Club =

Listed former sports club in York, England

- The building in 2023
- Interactive map of the York City Arms Sports Club area
- Former names: City Arms

General information
- Status: Converted into flats
- Type: Sports club (former); originally public house
- Location: Fawcett Street, York, England
- Coordinates: 53.9536°N 1.0751°W
- Year built: c. 1830
- Renovated: c. 1976 and c. 2001 (converted)
- Closed: Mid-1970s (as a pub); 2001 (as a club)

Design and construction
- Designations

Listed Building – Grade II
- Official name: York City Arms Sports Club
- Designated: 14 March 1997
- Reference no.: 1257864

York City Arms Sports Club is a Grade II listed former sports club, originally a public house, on Fawcett Street in York, England. The building is dated to around 1830 in its official listing, and The Press reports that it opened as the City Arms pub in 1829. After operating for more than a century, it was taken over by local sports clubs in 1976 and used as their headquarters until its closure in 2001, after which it was converted into flats.

== History ==
The building's official listing gives a construction date of around 1830. The Press reports that it opened on Fawcett Street in 1829, when it was known as the City Arms public house.

In 1968 the site was included within the newly established Central Historic Core conservation area. The following year, John Smith's Brewery announced that it would not renew the lease. At that time the pub had been run for ten years by David Chapman and his wife, Dorothy Dunne. The lease was taken over in November 1969 by Ray Dickinson, who had previously managed the Waggon and Horses on Lawrence Street and the Coach and Horses on Micklegate. He ran the pub for several years, but in 1972 it attracted attention when it was targeted by arsonists four times in a single month.

In 1976 the York Amalgamation of Anglers and the York City Baths Club joined forces to purchase the then‑derelict building for £19,000, establishing it as the headquarters of the newly formed York City Arms Sports Club. It was converted and refurbished and eventually contained a main bar, a disco room, four meeting rooms, a restaurant, an office and a flat.

On 14 March 1997, York City Arms Sports Club was designated a Grade II listed building. In January 2001 the sports club closed, after which the building was converted into flats.

== Architecture ==
Entrance detail in 2022

The building is of brick with a painted porch and has a hipped roof of slate. The main front is two storeys and seven bays wide. The upper windows are sashes set beneath painted lintels. One bay contains a low former doorway, now blocked and fitted with a window, with a small extra window beside it. Another bay has a tall single‑storey porch with square columns and pilasters, and above it is a large painted carving of the York City arms with civic regalia. The entrance door is panelled and has an overlight. The guttering is carried on rectangular timber brackets. To the right is an additional bay with lower eaves and an altered first‑floor casement window, and beyond that a single‑storey three‑bay wing that has been changed by the insertion of a 20th‑century door and surround in the centre bay.

== See also ==
- Listed buildings in York (outside the city walls, southern part)
