= Joseph Rowntree =

Joseph Rowntree may refer to:

- Joseph Rowntree (Senior) (1801–1859), English grocer and educational reformer
- Joseph Rowntree (philanthropist) (1836–1925), son of the above, English chocolate manufacturer and philanthropist
- Joseph Rowntree (Canadian) (fl. 1843), Canadian pioneer and mill owner
