= Wellington Inn =

Listed pub in York, England

- The pub in 2025
- Interactive map of the Wellington Inn area
- Former names: Lawson's Beerhouse; Sir Colin Campbell
- Alternative names: The Welly

General information
- Type: Public house
- Location: 47 Alma Terrace, York, England
- Coordinates: 53.94732°N 1.07694°W
- Years built: c. 1850 (pub); 1897 (stable)
- Opening: August 2026
- Closed: November 2024
- Owner: Samuel Smith's

Design and construction
- Designations

Listed Building – Grade II
- Official name: The Wellington Inn
- Designated: 9 March 1994
- Reference no.: 1259535

Listed Building – Grade II
- Official name: Stable approximately 10 metres to rear of number 47 the Wellington Inn
- Designated: 9 March 1994
- Reference no.: 1259536

The Wellington Inn is a Grade II listed public house on Alma Terrace in York, England. Dating from around 1850, it is a mid‑terrace back‑street pub a short walk from the River Ouse, and was designated in 1994 as part of a joint Campaign for Real Ale (CAMRA) and English Heritage pilot study on historic pub interiors. CAMRA describes its largely intact interior as being of "very special national historic interest", and it is considered the oldest purpose‑built York pub to remain substantially unchanged. The pub has been owned by Samuel Smith's since 1887.

== History ==
The public house, on Alma Terrace, is a mid‑terrace back‑street house dating from around 1850. It stands within a short walk of the River Ouse and has long served as a small neighbourhood local. In 1867 it traded as Lawson's Beerhouse, and by 1887 it was known as the Sir Colin Campbell. It was acquired by Samuel Smith's in the same year.

On 9 March 1994, the Wellington Inn was designated a Grade II listed building, one of the first statutory listings arising from the joint Campaign for Real Ale (CAMRA) and English Heritage pilot study undertaken that year.

CAMRA regards the Wellington Inn as having an interior of "very special national historic interest", and it is rated two stars in the organisation's grading scheme. It is considered the oldest purpose‑built York pub to remain largely unchanged. The only notable alterations are the insertion of the large rectangular opening to the servery and the addition of a modern counter in the 1980s.

The pub closed in November 2024. At the time, its owner, Humphrey Smith of Samuel Smith's, was known for abrupt management changes and pub closures. Following his death, several Sam Smith's houses reopened; the Wellington Inn returned to operation in August 2026.

== Architecture ==
The building is made of buff‑brown brick with painted stone details and has a slate roof at the front and a tiled roof at the back. It has two storeys and a symmetrical three‑bay front, with an extra bay on the right above a carriage entrance. The central doorway has double doors and a decorative surround, and the windows on either side have matching frames with upper opening lights over larger panes. The carriage arch is elliptical and fitted with boarded doors. The first‑floor windows are sashes with four panes over four, all set on painted stone sills.

At the rear, part of the ground floor is hidden by later additions. There is a central door with glazing and panelling, and a sash window to the left, both sheltered by a small glazed porch on iron supports. The first‑floor windows are 12‑pane sashes with painted stone sills and simple brick arches.

The front lounge in 2023

=== Interior ===
The inside follows a traditional beerhouse layout, with a central passage. On one side are the public bar, with a serving hatch, and a small private room; on the other are two compact lounges. The front rooms retain their original fireplaces, and the rear right room is lined with timber boarding. The entrance passage has a stone floor. The staircase has shaped step ends, slim turned balusters and a curved handrail that sweeps around at the base. Some of the bench seating may be original.

== Associated stable ==
A former stable and loft, now used as a store, is a small brick outbuilding dating from 1897 and is separately Grade II listed. It has a single‑storey front with an upper loft and a simple two‑bay plan. The yard side has a stable door with a small window beside it, while the outer elevation includes two high-level openings and a former loading hatch now boarded over. Inside, a timber partition between two stalls survives, along with a loft ladder made from planks cut with stirrup‑shaped footholds.

== See also ==
- Listed buildings in York (outside the city walls, southern part)
