= 22–26 Blossom Street =

Listed building in York, England

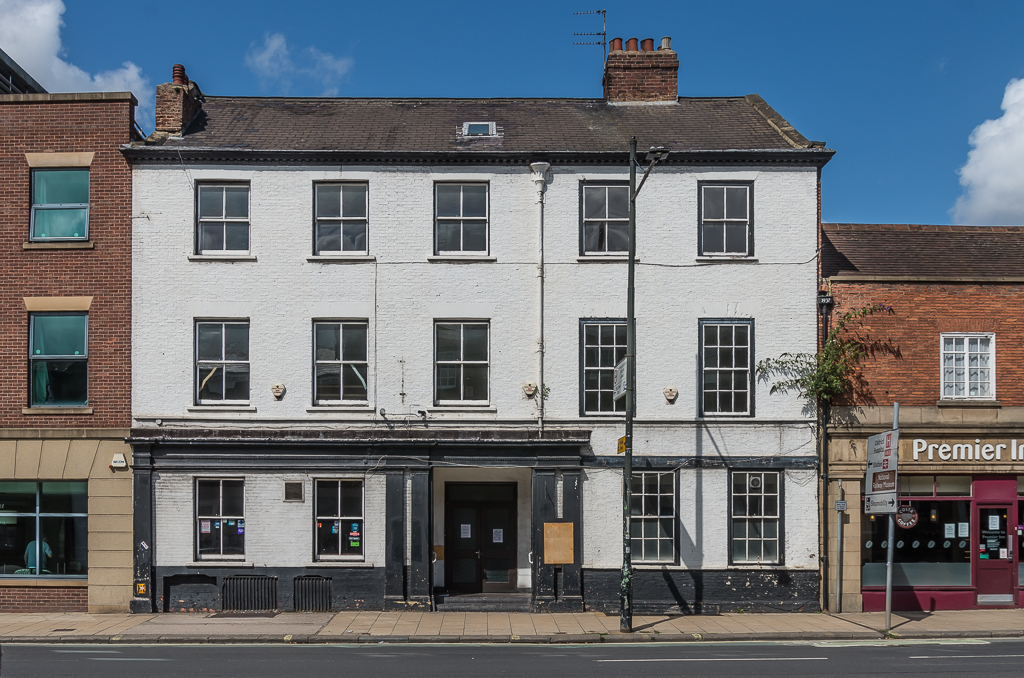
- The building in 2019, prior to conversion
- Interactive map of the 22–26 Blossom Street area
- Former names: Railwaymen's Club and Institute; New York Working Men's Club

General information
- Status: Converted to residential use
- Type: Working men's club (former); originally houses and a warehouse
- Location: Blossom Street, York, England
- Coordinates: 53°57′18″N 1°05′34″W
- Year built: 1789; 237 years ago
- Renovated: Early 19th century (altered); 1934 (altered)
- Client: John Horner

Design and construction
- Designations

Listed Building – Grade II
- Official name: Railwaymens Club and Institute
- Designated: 19 August 1971
- Reference no.: 1259530

22–26 Blossom Street is a historic building on Blossom Street immediately west of the city centre of York, England.

The building was constructed in 1789 for the wine merchant John Horner as a pair of houses, with a central passageway leading to a warehouse at the rear. Horner lived in the smaller house, and leased the larger to another wine merchant. The building was altered in the early 19th century. Later residents included the architects Charles Watson and James Pigott Pritchett, and the shopkeeper Joseph Rowntree and his family. In 1888, it was purchased by the North Eastern Railway (NER), which used the larger house as the residence of the stationmaster at York railway station and the smaller house for one of its inspectors.

In 1934, the NER's successor sold the property for conversion into the York Railwaymen's Club. The two houses were combined, with the dividing walls on the ground floor of the larger house demolished, along with all the first-floor dividing walls. The entire property was Grade II listed in 1971. The building was later used as the New York Working Men's Club. This closed in 2019, and the building was converted into seven holiday lets, with a further seven in a newly constructed block at the rear.

The building is constructed of painted brick, with a slate roof. It has three storeys and is five bays wide, and almost all the windows are sashes. A timber entablature runs across bays 1 to 3, supported on the left by a pilaster and on the right by pilasters flanking the entrance. To the left are three cellar entrances, now partly blocked. Other features include a lead rainwater head and downpipe, a dentilled and modillioned cornice gutter, and two chimneys. Inside, some Regency-style fittings survive, probably designed by Watson or Pritchett.

== See also ==
- Listed buildings in York (outside the city walls, southern part)
