= Fishergate Primary School =

Listed school in York, England

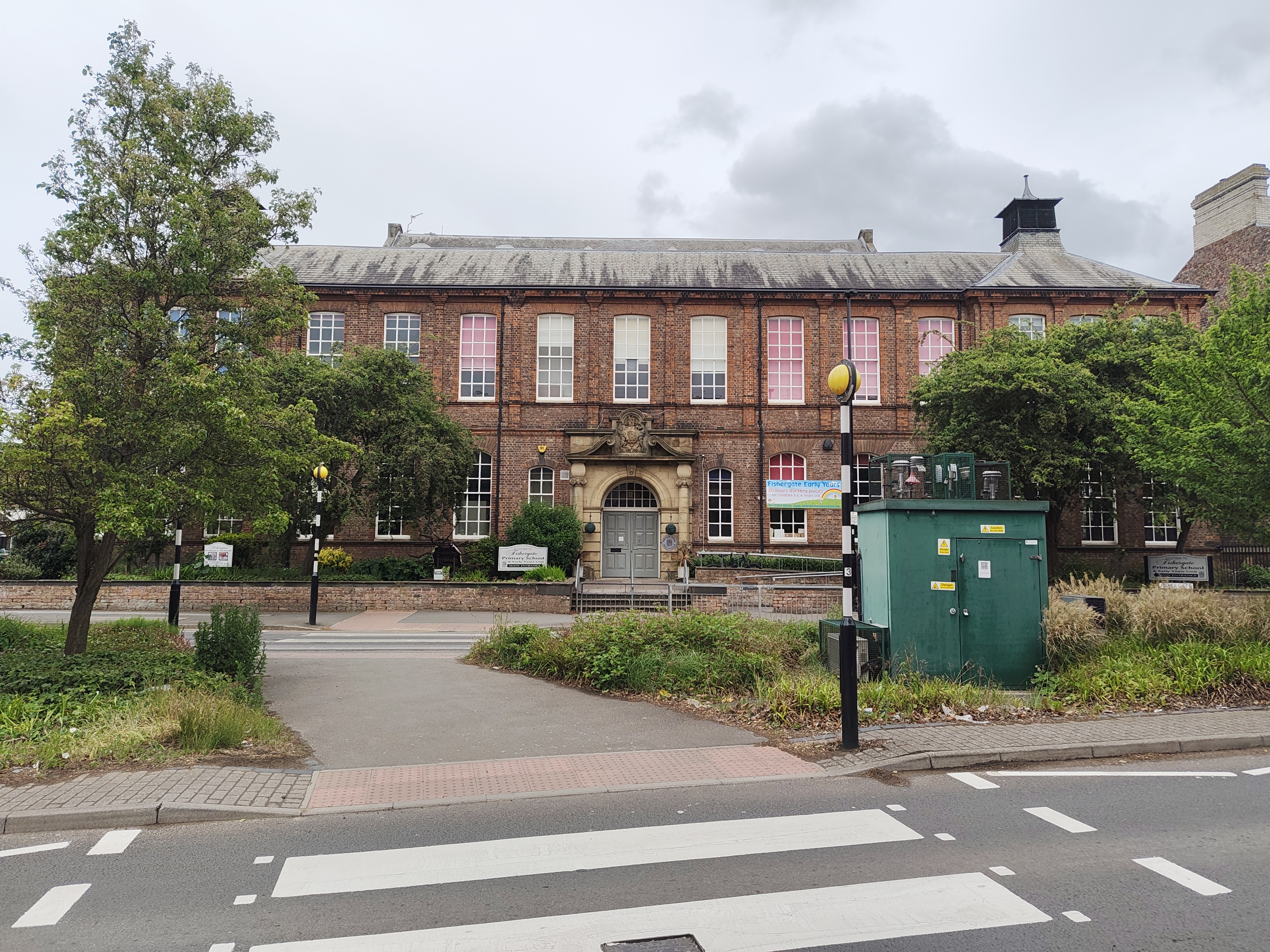
- The school in 2025
- Interactive map of the Fishergate Primary School area

General information
- Location: Fishergate, York, England
- Coordinates: 53°57′07″N 1°04′31″W
- Year built: 1893–1895
- Client: York School Board

Design and construction
- Architect: Walter Brierley

Website
- fishergateschool.com

Listed Building – Grade II
- Official name: Fishergate County Primary School
- Designated: 14 March 1997
- Reference no.: 1257844

Fishergate Primary School is a historic school on Fishergate, immediately south of York city centre, England.

The York School Board commissioned Walter Brierley to design a new school building on Fishergate, to accommodate 180 pupils. Work started in 1893, and the school opened in August 1895. The school building was Grade II listed in 1997. In 2022, two Victorian rocking horses were discovered in the school's basement, then restored for the use of current pupils. By that time, the roll had risen to 300 children. In 2025, it was the first primary school in York to be designated as a School of Sanctuary.

The building is constructed of orange-brown brick, with dressings in orange brick, some of which is moulded, and slate roofs. It has two storeys and the front has a nine-bay central wing, with three-bay crosswings either side. Behind is a tall six-bay hall range, and at the rear is a 16-bay two-storey range. Most of the windows are sashes, while the hall has dormer windows. The first floor windows at the front are separate by brick pilasters, with a brick frieze and cornice above. The central entrance has a round arch with a lion keystone and a panel above with the Royal Arms and the date "1894".

== See also ==
- Listed buildings in York (outside the city walls, southern part)
