= Pikeing Well =

Listed well in York, England

- The wellhead in 2023
- Interactive map of the Pikeing Well area
- Alternative names: Lady Well

General information
- Location: New Walk, York, England
- Coordinates: 53°56′55″N 1°04′42″W
- Completed: 1752; 274 years ago
- Renovated: 2000 (restored)

Design and construction
- Architect: John Carr
- Designations

Listed Building – Grade II*
- Official name: Pikeing Well
- Designated: 14 June 1954
- Reference no.: 1257053

The Pikeing Well, occasionally known as Lady Well, is a well in the city of York, England.

The well lies on New Walk, which runs along the east bank of the River Ouse, Yorkshire, running south from the city centre. The walk was laid out in the 1730s, as an attraction for visitors to the city. By the 1750s, mineral water spas were popular places to visit. York did not have mineral water springs, so the city council instead decided to commission a decorative wellhead over an existing well. It claimed that the water was useful for healing illness related to the eye.

The wellhead was designed by John Carr, its form inspired by grottos. He reused medieval stonework, which is sometimes said to have come from the chancel of All Saints' Church, but must have come from another source, as the chancel was not demolished until 1782. The commission was for £88 13 shillings, but Carr's fee was reduced by £25 in exchange for granting him the Freedom of the City.

The building is small and rectangular, with a semicircular niche at the rear, and a round-headed door facing the river. It is built of a mixture of limestone and sandstone. There is a parapet, which incorporates a broken 12th-century capital. There is a barrel roof, now covered in asphalt. Inside, the floor is covered in flagstones, and in the centre is a stone-lined pool, with steps down to it.

The well was closed by the Ministry of Health in 1929, at which time, an iron gate was placed over the pool. The building was Grade II* listed in 1954, and it was restored in 2000.

== See also ==
- Grade II* listed buildings in the City of York
- Listed buildings in York (outside the city walls, southern part)
