= The Swan, York =

Listed pub in York, England

The Swan
- The pub in 2023
- Interactive map of the The Swan area

General information
- Type: Public house
- Location: 16 Bishopgate Street, Clementhorpe, York, England
- Coordinates: 53°57′09″N 1°05′02″W
- Completed: 1861; 165 years ago
- Renovated: 1936 (remodelled)

Design and construction
- Designations

Listed Building – Grade II
- Official name: The Swan public house
- Designated: 14 April 2010
- Reference no.: 1393749

Renovating team
- Architects: Kitson, Parish, Ledgard and Pyman

The Swan is a Grade II listed historic pub on Bishopgate Street in the suburb of Clementhorpe, immediately south-west of the city centre of York, England.

It was built as a beerhouse and grocery in 1861, at the end of a terrace on the northern extension of Bishopthorpe Road. In 1899, it was purchased by the brewery Joshua Tetley's & Son, which in 1936 decided to remodel it. The redesign was carried out by the Leeds architecture firm Kitson, Parish, Ledgard and Pyman, and survives largely intact.

The layout centres on a large drinking lobby, with two rooms leading off it: the public bar at the front and the grander smoke room at the rear. Each has a hatch for bar service. There is also a hatch from the servery to Clementhorpe, formerly used for take-out sales but now disused. At the rear are stairs up to first-floor accommodation and down to the cellar.

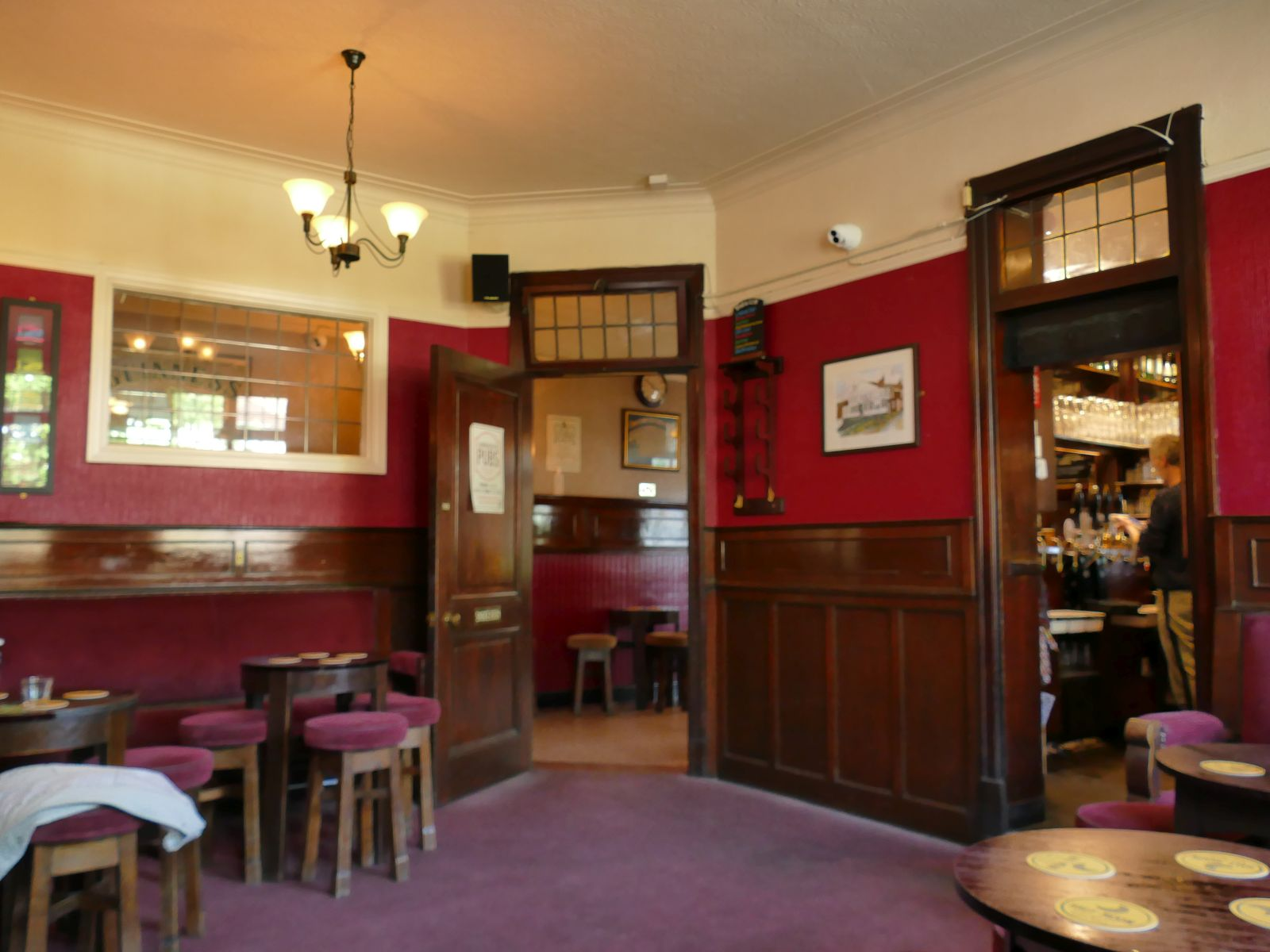
The rear lounge

Surviving features from the 1936 redesign include fitted seating, a terrazzo floor, bell pushes and toilets. The pub was designated a Tetley's heritage pub in 1985 and was listed in 2010 following a campaign by the Campaign for Real Ale (CAMRA), which describes it "one of the best preserved interiors of its kind in the country".

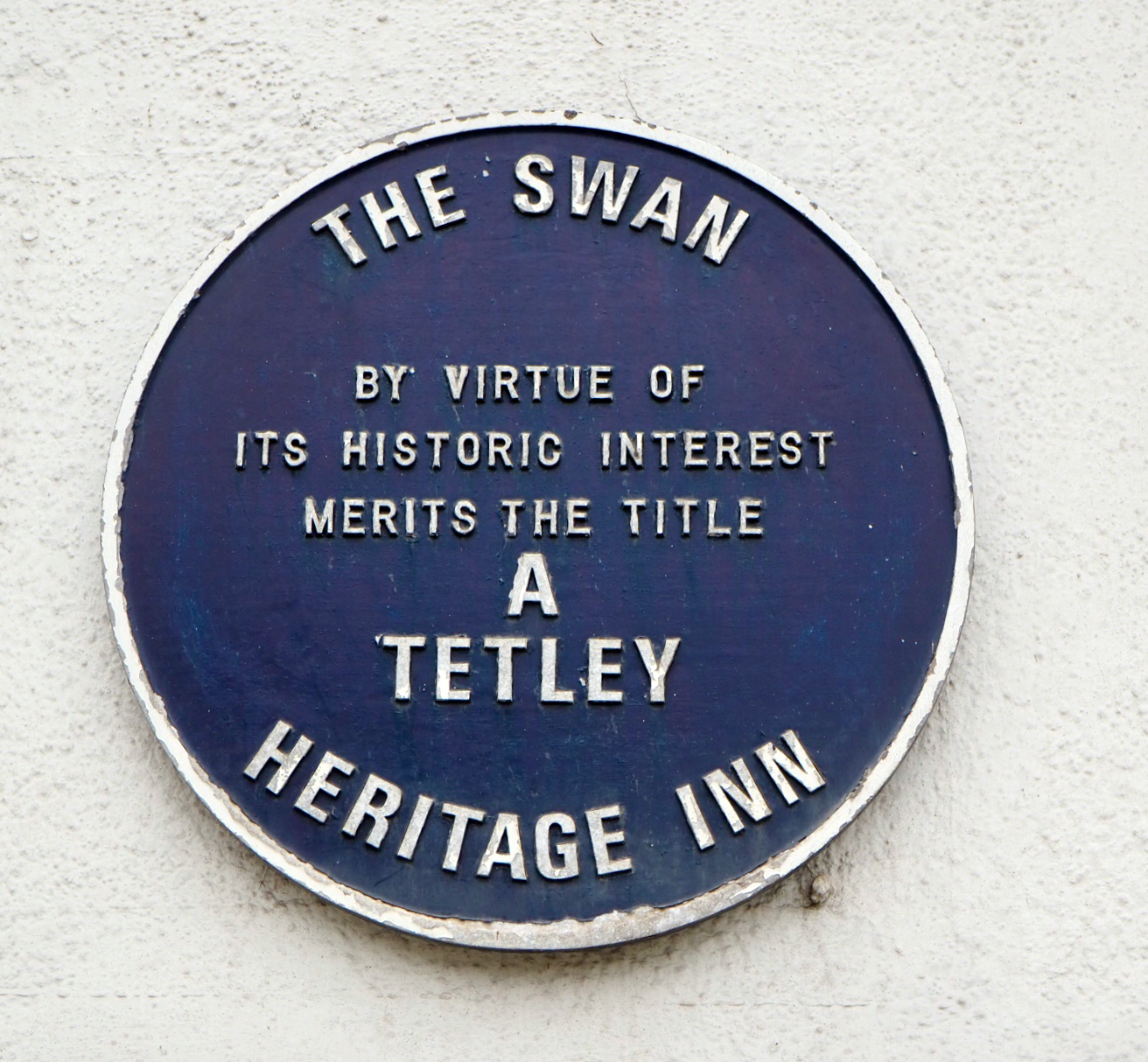
The heritage plaque

In 2009, CAMRA named The Swan its York Pub of the Year. By 2017, it was owned by Punch Taverns, and that year the landlord used the Pubs Code Regulations 2016 to move from being a tied house to operating on a market-rent-only basis. In 2020, the pub was one of 14 in the city to appear in the Good Beer Guide.

== See also ==
- The Black Swan, York, a pub on Peasholme Green in York city centre
- Listed buildings in York (outside the city walls, southern part)
