= Acomb House =

Listed building in York, England

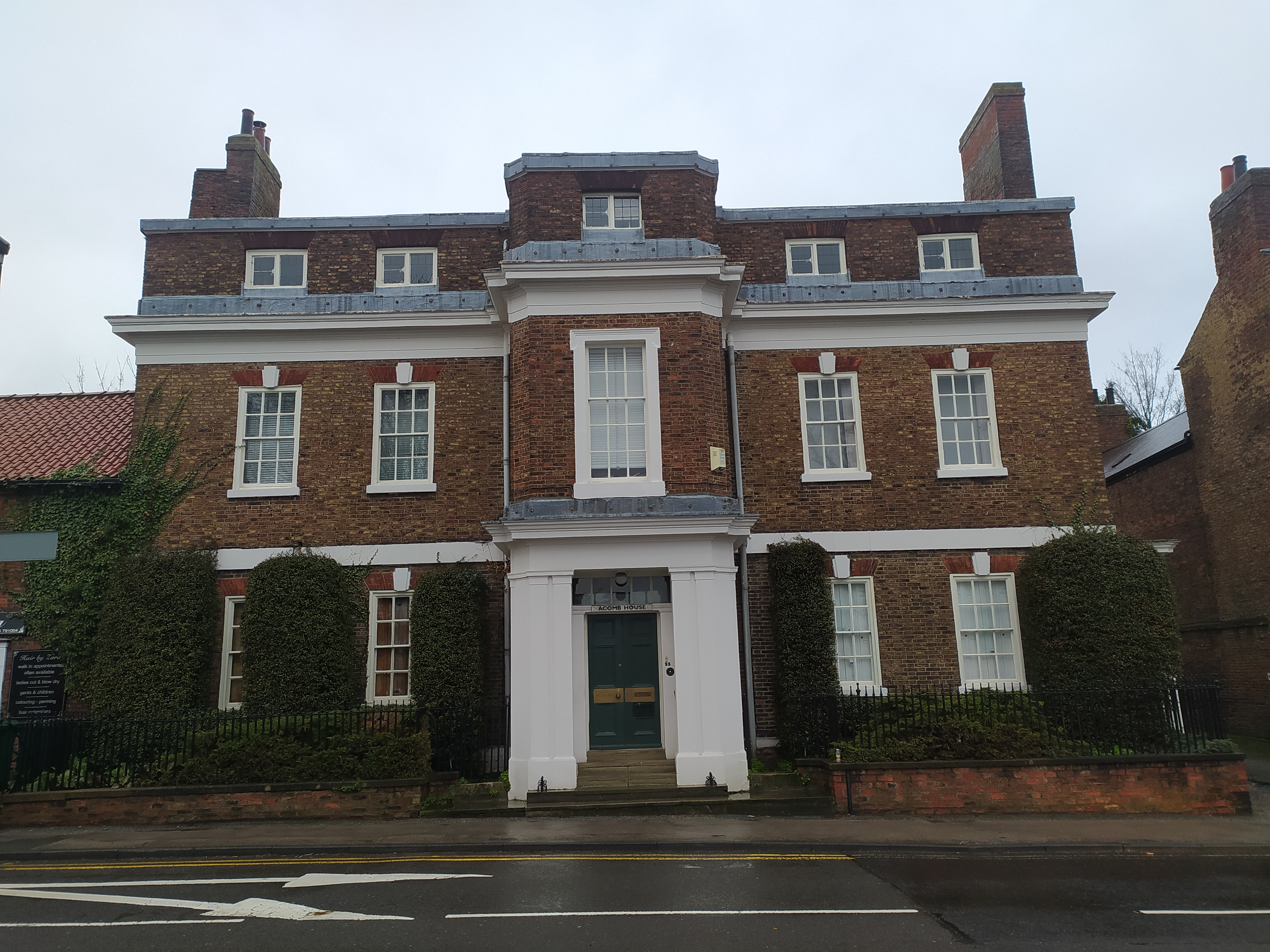
- The house in 2022
- Interactive map of the Acomb House area

General information
- Location: Front Street, Acomb, York, England
- Coordinates: 53°57′17″N 1°07′37″W
- Completed: Early 18th century
- Renovated: Late 18th and early 19th centuries (altered and added)

Technical details
- Floor count: 3

Design and construction
- Designations

Listed Building – Grade II*
- Official name: Acomb House and railings and gates attached to front
- Designated: 14 June 1954
- Reference no.: 1257795

Acomb House is a historic building on Front Street in the Acomb suburb of York, England.

Its site is believed to have been previously occupied by an earlier house belonging to the Blanshard family, described in 1733 as ancient. The present house was constructed in the first half of the 18th century to a symmetrical plan, apart from a small scullery block on the north side. It was altered in the late 18th century, probably when its porch and attic storey were added. Further alterations took place in the early 19th century, including changes to external parts of the ground floor and the addition of a new porch and staircase on the north side.

The house was Grade II* listed in 1954, and the small wall in front, topped with cast-iron railings, is also listed.

The building is of brick with some stone dressings. It has three storeys and is five bays wide. Inside, the ground floor retains much 18th-century plasterwork. The front east room has a late-18th-century fireplace and an early-19th-century built-in cupboard. The front west room is panelled from floor to ceiling, while the dining room contains another late-18th-century iron fireplace with a marble surround. The main staircase is original, while the servants' staircase has been rebuilt at first-floor level. The four principal first-floor rooms also retain early plasterwork, with the saloon having the most elaborate decoration.

== See also ==
- Grade II* listed buildings in the City of York
- Listed buildings in York (outside the city walls, southern part)
