= Crystal Palace, York =

Listed pub in York, England

Crystal Palace
- The pub in 2023
- Interactive map of the Crystal Palace area

General information
- Type: Public house
- Location: 66–68 Holgate Road, York, England
- Coordinates: 53.9539°N 1.0969°W
- Year built: c. 1845–1850
- Owner: Samuel Smith's

Design and construction
- Designations

Listed Building – Grade II
- Official name: The Crystal Palace public house
- Designated: 24 June 1983
- Reference no.: 1257592

The Crystal Palace is a Grade II listed public house on Holgate Road in York, England. Built around 1845 to 1850 and named after the structure created for the 1851 Great Exhibition, it lies within the Central Historic Core conservation area and remains in use today as a Samuel Smith's establishment.

== History ==
The public house was constructed on Holgate Road around 1845 to 1850 and has remained in use since. The pub takes its name from the Crystal Palace, the temporary structure built for the 1851 Great Exhibition in London.

The pub sign in 2014

In 1968 the site was included within the newly established Central Historic Core conservation area, and on 24 June 1983, the Crystal Palace was designated a Grade II listed building. As of June 2025, the freehold is owned by Samuel Smith's.

== Architecture ==
The building is of brick with some stone detailing and a slate roof. The front is symmetrical, with two storeys and three window bays. The windows are traditional sash types with small horns, set beneath stone lintels. Above the main entrance there is a shallow window. The doorway has a painted surround with simple mouldings. The eaves and gable ends project slightly, and there are chimneys on the gables. Single‑storey wings stand to either side; the one on the left is modern brickwork, while the one on the right has later two‑storey additions behind it.

== See also ==
- Listed buildings in York (outside the city walls, southern part)
