= Listed buildings in York (outside the city walls, southern part) =

York is a city in the City of York district, within the ceremonial county of North Yorkshire, England. It contains 65 Grade I, 161 Grade II*, and 1,004 Grade II listed buildings recorded in the National Heritage List for England.

This list is based on information retrieved from Historic England.

Because York has a large number of listed buildings, the subject is divided into geographically defined lists. This list covers all listed buildings outside the city walls, south and southwest of the inner city.

== Key ==
Grade	Criteria
I	Buildings that are of exceptional interest
II*	Particularly important buildings of more than special interest
II	Buildings that are of special interest

== Buildings ==
Name	Grade	Location	Type	Completed (Note: The date given is the date used by Historic England as significant for the initial building or that of an important part in the structure's description.)	Date designated	Grid ref. (Note: The grid reference is based on the British national grid reference system, sometimes known as OSGB36, used by the Ordnance Survey.) Geo-coordinates	Entry number (Note: The "List Entry Number" is a unique number assigned to each listed building and scheduled monument by Historic England.)	Image	Wikidata
West tower of the Old Church of St Lawrence	I	Lawrence Street	Tower	Late 12th century	14 June 1954	SE6122551303; 53°57′15″N 1°04′07″W	1257511	West tower of the Old Church of St Lawrence More images	Q17530609
Hob's Stone at NGR SE 589 504	II	Tadcaster Road	Coffin lid	Early 14th century (probable)	19 August 1971	SE5891450417; 53°56′47″N 1°06′14″W	1256501	Hob's Stone at NGR SE 589 504	Q26548003
Fulford Cross	II	Fulford Road	Boundary cross	15th century	19 August 1971	SE6086950130; 53°56′37″N 1°04′27″W	1257807	Fulford Cross More images	Q17662344
Acomb Manor House	II	14–14A Front Street, Acomb	House	Late 15th century	20 September 1974	SE5735651264; 53°57′15″N 1°07′39″W	1257792	Acomb Manor House	Q26549116
16 Front Street	II	Acomb	House	c. 1500	20 September 1974	SE5732251251; 53°57′15″N 1°07′41″W	1257793	16 Front Street More images	Q26549117
Boundary stone at NGR SE 5906 5037	II	Tadcaster Road	Boundary stone	Medieval (probable)	14 March 1997	SE5905750376; 53°56′46″N 1°06′06″W	1256499	Boundary stone at NGR SE 5906 5037	Q26548001
17 Tadcaster Road	II	Dringhouses	House	17th century	19 August 1971	SE5882849819; 53°56′28″N 1°06′19″W	1256503	17 Tadcaster Road	Q26548005
23 Tadcaster Road	II	Dringhouses	House	17th century	8 January 1982	SE5881649784; 53°56′27″N 1°06′20″W	1256504	23 Tadcaster Road	Q26548006
Windmill Hotel	II	14–16 Blossom Street	Public house	Late 17th century	1 July 1968	SE5970251424; 53°57′20″N 1°05′30″W	1259525	Windmill Hotel More images	Q26550632
Bay Horse Inn	II	55 Blossom Street	Public house	Late 17th century	24 June 1983	SE5960751272; 53°57′15″N 1°05′35″W	1259498	Bay Horse Inn More images	Q26550607
82, 84 and 86 The Mount	II		House	Late 17th century	24 June 1983	SE5952051231; 53°57′14″N 1°05′40″W	1256448	82, 84 and 86 The Mount More images	Q26547961
8 and 10 Lawrence Street	II		House	Late 17th century and early 19th century	24 June 1983	SE6110551377; 53°57′18″N 1°04′13″W	1257496	8 and 10 Lawrence Street More images	Q26548845
The Lodge	II	21 Front Street, Acomb	House	Late 17th or early 18th century	14 June 1954	SE5740051322; 53°57′17″N 1°07′36″W	1257794	The Lodge	Q26549118
6 Front Street	II	Acomb	House	Early 18th century	1 April 1982	SE5743951312; 53°57′17″N 1°07′34″W	1257790	6 Front Street	Q26549114
8 Front Street	II	Acomb	House	Early 18th century	14 June 1954	SE5743251306; 53°57′17″N 1°07′35″W	1257791	8 Front Street	Q26549115
Acomb House and railings and gates attached to front	II*	23 Front Street, Acomb	House	Early 18th century	14 June 1954	SE5738051315; 53°57′17″N 1°07′37″W	1257795	Acomb House and railings and gates attached to front More images	Q17549909
Rose and Crown public house	II	13 Lawrence Street	Public house	Early 18th century	4 January 1996	SE6115651396; 53°57′18″N 1°04′10″W	1257497	Rose and Crown public house More images	Q26548846
Nunroyd	II	1 Mill Mount	House	Early 18th century	14 June 1954	SE5944851070; 53°57′08″N 1°05′44″W	1256457	Nunroyd More images	Q26547970
Cross Keys Hotel	II	32 Tadcaster Road, Dringhouses	Hotel	Early 18th century	24 June 1983	SE5874049741; 53°56′26″N 1°06′24″W	1256462	Cross Keys Hotel More images	Q26547974
64 and 66 Tadcaster Road	II	Dringhouses	House	Early 18th century	19 August 1971	SE5863849543; 53°56′19″N 1°06′30″W	1256465	64 and 66 Tadcaster Road	Q26547977
Rowntree Park Memorial Gates	II*	Terry Avenue	Gate	Early 18th century	24 June 1983	SE6045950621; 53°56′53″N 1°04′49″W	1256477	Rowntree Park Memorial Gates More images	Q17549275
169 Holgate Road	II		House	Early to mid-18th century	24 June 1983	SE5870851382; 53°57′19″N 1°06′25″W	1257541	169 Holgate Road More images	Q26548883
19 and 21 Blossom Street	II		House	Mid-18th century	14 June 1954	SE5971051377; 53°57′18″N 1°05′30″W	1259526	19 and 21 Blossom Street More images	Q26550633
27 Front Street	II	Acomb	House	Mid-18th century	14 March 1997	SE5736551305; 53°57′17″N 1°07′38″W	1257797	27 Front Street	Q26549120
103 Front Street	II	Acomb	House	Mid-18th century	24 June 1983	SE5708151164; 53°57′12″N 1°07′54″W	1257800	103 Front Street More images	Q26549123
Gale Farm	II	1 Gale Lane, Acomb	House	Mid-18th century	19 August 1971	SE5708951092; 53°57′10″N 1°07′54″W	1257809	Gale Farm	Q26549132
Gate piers to number 23 (Acomb House)	II	Front Street, Acomb	Gate piers	18th century	24 June 1983	SE5739651314; 53°57′17″N 1°07′37″W	1257796	Upload Photo	Q26549119
Two boundary stones at NGR SE 5923 5075	II	Knavesmire Road	Boundary stone	18th century	24 June 1983	SE5923150754; 53°56′58″N 1°05′56″W	1257534	Two boundary stones at NGR SE 5923 5075 More images	Q26548878
Mounting block approximately 66 metres south of junction with St George's Place	II	Tadcaster Road	Mounting block	18th century (probable)	24 June 1983	SE5913550580; 53°56′53″N 1°06′02″W	1256502	Mounting block approximately 66 metres south of junction with St George's Place	Q26548004
Pikeing Well	II*	New Walk	Wellhead	1752	14 June 1954	SE6058250661; 53°56′55″N 1°04′42″W	1257053	Pikeing Well More images	Q17549610
Guinness bar in the Old Grandstand at York Racecourse	II*	Knavesmire	Stand	1755	14 June 1954	SE5966049908; 53°56′31″N 1°05′33″W	1257530	Upload Photo	Q17549836
167 and 167A Holgate Road	II		House	Mid to late 18th century	24 June 1983	SE5871951375; 53°57′19″N 1°06′24″W	1257539	167 and 167A Holgate Road More images	Q26548881
Holgate Windmill	II	Windmill Rise	Windmill	1770–1792	14 June 1954	SE5841951477; 53°57′22″N 1°06′40″W	1256229	Holgate Windmill More images	Q5880199
The Waggon and Horses public house (number 19)	II	Lawrence Street	Public house	1773	24 June 1983	SE6117651384; 53°57′18″N 1°04′09″W	1257498	The Waggon and Horses public house (number 19) More images	Q26548847
Summerhouse approximately 75 metres south west of the Mount School	II*	Dalton Terrace	Summerhouse	c. 1774	24 June 1983	SE5920251047; 53°57′08″N 1°05′58″W	1257913	Upload Photo	Q17549959
Collingwood Hotel	II*	163 Holgate Road	Hotel	c. 1775	24 June 1983	SE5875051344; 53°57′18″N 1°06′22″W	1257537	Collingwood Hotel More images	Q17549846
2 Front Street	II	Acomb	House	Late 18th century	14 June 1954	SE5747951338; 53°57′18″N 1°07′32″W	1257830	2 Front Street	Q26549149
St Lawrence Working Men's Club	II	29–31 Lawrence Street	House	Late 18th century	19 August 1971	SE6123351394; 53°57′18″N 1°04′06″W	1257500	St Lawrence Working Men's Club More images	Q26548849
The Old Convent	II	29 Fishergate	House	Late 18th century, 1902	14 June 1954	SE6074851142; 53°57′10″N 1°04′33″W	1257840	The Old Convent More images	Q26549159
1 Fawcett Street	II		House	Late 18th century (probable)	14 March 1997	SE6076451242; 53°57′13″N 1°04′32″W	1257860	1 Fawcett Street More images	Q26549175
Railwaymen's Club and Institute	II	22–26 Blossom Street	House	1789	19 August 1971	SE5967151393; 53°57′19″N 1°05′32″W	1259530	Railwaymen's Club and Institute More images	Q26550637
The Retreat and boundary walls	II*	Heslington Road	Hospital	1793–1797	14 June 1954	SE6158350944; 53°57′03″N 1°03′47″W	1257679	The Retreat and boundary walls More images	Q2146269
5 The Green	II	Acomb	House	c. 1800	14 June 1954	SE5726151368; 53°57′19″N 1°07′44″W	1256479	5 The Green	Q26547989
30 Lawrence Street	II		Mill	c. 1804	13 June 1988	SE6112451316; 53°57′16″N 1°04′12″W	1257502	30 Lawrence Street More images	Q26548851
100, 102 and 104 The Mount	II		House	1807–08	14 June 1954	SE5948451188; 53°57′12″N 1°05′42″W	1256454	100, 102 and 104 The Mount More images	Q26547967
Fulford Conservative Club	II	103 Fulford Road	House	c. 1810	24 June 1983	SE6088650732; 53°56′57″N 1°04′26″W	1257802	Fulford Conservative Club More images	Q26549125
Number 11 and attached wall and railings	II	Acomb Road	House	c. 1820	24 June 1983	SE5865451399; 53°57′19″N 1°06′28″W	1259567	Number 11 and attached wall and railings More images	Q26550669
29 Blossom Street	II		House	c. 1820	14 June 1954	SE5968651353; 53°57′17″N 1°05′31″W	1259492	29 Blossom Street More images	Q26550601
218 Mount Vale	II		House	c. 1820	14 March 1997	SE5915050717; 53°56′57″N 1°06′01″W	1257155	218 Mount Vale	Q26548554
56 and 58 The Green	II	Acomb	House	c. 1820 and c. 1830	24 June 1983	SE5707051239; 53°57′15″N 1°07′55″W	1256481	56 and 58 The Green	Q26547991
92 and 94 The Mount	II		House	1821	14 June 1954	SE5950351205; 53°57′13″N 1°05′41″W	1256451	92 and 94 The Mount	Q26547964
Newington Hotel	II	147–153 Mount Vale	House	1823 (Nos. 149 and 151); 1827 (No. 147)	24 June 1983	SE5924950765; 53°56′59″N 1°05′55″W	1257141	Newington Hotel More images	Q26548541
1 and 2 Mount Parade	II		House	1823–1828	14 June 1954	SE5939551140; 53°57′11″N 1°05′47″W	1257191	1 and 2 Mount Parade	Q26548589
3 and 4 Mount Parade	II		House	1823–1828	14 June 1954	SE5939051145; 53°57′11″N 1°05′47″W	1257197	3 and 4 Mount Parade	Q26548596
5, 6 and 7 Mount Parade	II		House	1823–1828	19 August 1971	SE5937851158; 53°57′11″N 1°05′48″W	1257198	5, 6 and 7 Mount Parade	Q26548597
Numbers 136–144 (even) and attached walls and railings	II	The Mount	House	1824	14 June 1954	SE5940451098; 53°57′09″N 1°05′47″W	1256437	Numbers 136–144 (even) and attached walls and railings	Q26547951
13–17 New Walk Terrace	II		House	c. 1825	14 June 1954	SE6066350796; 53°56′59″N 1°04′38″W	1257057	13–17 New Walk Terrace More images	Q26548473
18 New Walk Terrace	II		House	c. 1825	14 June 1954	SE6063350797; 53°56′59″N 1°04′39″W	1257058	Upload Photo	Q26548474
Ivy Cottage	II	33 Fishergate	House	Early 19th century	24 June 1983	SE6075151111; 53°57′09″N 1°04′33″W	1257842	Ivy Cottage More images	Q26549161
61 Lawrence Street	II		Shop	Early 19th century	24 June 1983	SE6133951361; 53°57′17″N 1°04′00″W	1257504	61 Lawrence Street More images	Q26548853
Garden railings, gate standards and gate to number 6 fronting Holgate Road	II	Mount Terrace	Railings	Early 19th century	24 June 1983	SE5927151225; 53°57′13″N 1°05′54″W	1257139	Upload Photo	Q26548539
Pinfold approximately 30 metres south of Fox Hotel (hotel not included)	II	Tadcaster Road, Dringhouses	Pound	Early 19th century	24 June 1983	SE5866649541; 53°56′19″N 1°06′28″W	1256468	Pinfold approximately 30 metres south of Fox Hotel (hotel not included) More images	Q26547980
Number 34 and attached railings	II	Tadcaster Road, Dringhouses	House	Early 19th century	14 June 1954	SE5873249708; 53°56′25″N 1°06′24″W	1256463	Number 34 and attached railings	Q26547975
3–20 South Parade, 43 Blossom Street	II		House	1825–1828	14 June 1954	SE5970051278; 53°57′15″N 1°05′30″W	1256614	3–20 South Parade, 43 Blossom Street More images	Q26548096
Mount Terrace House	II	6 Mount Terrace	House	c. 1827	1 July 1968	SE5927851213; 53°57′13″N 1°05′53″W	1257137	Mount Terrace House	Q26548537
Number 2 and attached walls, railings and gate	II	Mount Terrace	House	1827–28	14 June 1954	SE5929751197; 53°57′13″N 1°05′52″W	1257172	Upload Photo	Q26548570
3 and 4 Mount Terrace	II		House	1827–28	14 June 1954	SE5928951204; 53°57′13″N 1°05′53″W	1257175	3 and 4 Mount Terrace	Q26548573
5 Mount Terrace	II		House	1827–28	14 June 1954	SE5928551208; 53°57′13″N 1°05′53″W	1257178	5 Mount Terrace	Q26548576
15 and 16 Dove Street	II		House	1827–1830	14 March 1997	SE5993051162; 53°57′11″N 1°05′18″W	1257887	15 and 16 Dove Street More images	Q26549197
21 and 22 Dove Street	II		House	1827–1830	14 March 1997	SE5993551122; 53°57′10″N 1°05′17″W	1257888	21 and 22 Dove Street More images	Q26549198
23 and 24 Dove Street	II		House	1827–1830	14 March 1997	SE5994451134; 53°57′10″N 1°05′17″W	1257889	23 and 24 Dove Street More images	Q26549199
25 and 26 Dove Street	II		House	1827–1830	14 March 1997	SE5994751139; 53°57′10″N 1°05′17″W	1257890	25 and 26 Dove Street More images	Q26549200
27, 28 and 29 Dove Street	II		House	1827–1830	14 March 1997	SE5995251146; 53°57′11″N 1°05′17″W	1257891	27, 28 and 29 Dove Street More images	Q26549201
39 Blossom Street	II		Public house	1828	24 June 1983	SE5967151334; 53°57′17″N 1°05′32″W	1259497	39 Blossom Street More images	Q26550606
77 Holgate Road	II		House	c. 1828–1830	19 August 1971	SE5932651208; 53°57′13″N 1°05′51″W	1257559	77 Holgate Road More images	Q26548900
8 Mount Parade	II		House	1829–30	19 August 1971	SE5937551161; 53°57′11″N 1°05′48″W	1257158	8 Mount Parade	Q26548556
9 Mount Parade	II		House	1829–30	19 August 1971	SE5937051166; 53°57′11″N 1°05′48″W	1257159	9 Mount Parade	Q26548557
10 Mount Parade	II		House	1829–30	19 August 1971	SE5936551170; 53°57′12″N 1°05′49″W	1257160	10 Mount Parade	Q26548558
11 Mount Parade	II		House	c. 1830	19 August 1971	SE5936051174; 53°57′12″N 1°05′49″W	1257163	11 Mount Parade	Q26548561
19 Mount Parade	II		House	c. 1830	19 August 1971	SE5932151210; 53°57′13″N 1°05′51″W	1257167	19 Mount Parade More images	Q26548565
7 Bishopgate Street	II		House	c. 1830	24 June 1983	SE6023251151; 53°57′11″N 1°05′01″W	1259546	7 Bishopgate Street More images	Q26550651
St Clement's Church House	II	16 Cygnet Street	House	c. 1830	14 March 1997	SE5988051139; 53°57′10″N 1°05′20″W	1257909	St Clement's Church House More images	Q26549215
York City Arms Sports Club	II	Fawcett Street	Public house	c. 1830	14 March 1997	SE6079651224; 53°57′13″N 1°04′30″W	1257864	York City Arms Sports Club More images	Q26549179
16 and 16A Fishergate	II		Shop	c. 1830	14 March 1997	SE6065651259; 53°57′14″N 1°04′38″W	1257838	16 and 16A Fishergate More images	Q26549157
The Edinburgh Arms	II	25 Fishergate	Public house	c. 1830	14 March 1997	SE6074051165; 53°57′11″N 1°04′33″W	1257839	The Edinburgh Arms More images	Q26549158
Numbers 63 and 65 and attached walls and railings	II	Holgate Road	House	c. 1830	24 June 1983	SE5937251206; 53°57′13″N 1°05′48″W	1257590	Numbers 63 and 65 and attached walls and railings More images	Q26548930
71 and 73 Holgate Road	II		House	c. 1830	19 August 1971	SE5934451208; 53°57′13″N 1°05′50″W	1257596	71 and 73 Holgate Road More images	Q26548936
75 Holgate Road	II		House	c. 1830	19 August 1971	SE5933351208; 53°57′13″N 1°05′50″W	1257558	75 Holgate Road More images	Q26548899
171 Holgate Road	II		House	c. 1830	24 June 1983	SE5870151384; 53°57′19″N 1°06′25″W	1257542	171 Holgate Road	Q26548884
Millfield House (number 153A) and Tall Timbers (number 165A)	II	Hull Road	House	c. 1830	24 June 1983	SE6261251359; 53°57′16″N 1°02′50″W	1257547	Upload Photo	Q26548889
85 and 87 Lawrence Street	II		House	c. 1830	19 August 1971	SE6143951351; 53°57′17″N 1°03′55″W	1257506	85 and 87 Lawrence Street More images	Q26548855
93 Lawrence Street	II		House	c. 1830	1 July 1968	SE6146251355; 53°57′17″N 1°03′54″W	1257508	93 Lawrence Street More images	Q26548857
25 The Green	II	Acomb	House	c. 1830	24 June 1983	SE5714751402; 53°57′20″N 1°07′50″W	1256480	25 The Green	Q26547990
69 The Mount	II		House	c. 1830	14 June 1954	SE5957151229; 53°57′13″N 1°05′37″W	1256443	69 The Mount More images	Q26547956
71 The Mount	II		House	c. 1830	14 June 1954	SE5956651223; 53°57′13″N 1°05′38″W	1256444	71 The Mount More images	Q26547957
73 and 75 The Mount	II		House	c. 1830	14 June 1954	SE5956151219; 53°57′13″N 1°05′38″W	1256446	73 and 75 The Mount More images	Q26547959
96 and 98 The Mount	II		House	c. 1830	24 June 1983	SE5949351196; 53°57′12″N 1°05′42″W	1256452	Upload Photo	Q26547965
Number 130 and attached walls and railings	II	The Mount	House	c. 1830	10 September 1970	SE5942651121; 53°57′10″N 1°05′45″W	1256433	Number 130 and attached walls and railings	Q26547947
132 The Mount	II		House	c. 1830	10 September 1970	SE5941951120; 53°57′10″N 1°05′46″W	1256435	132 The Mount	Q26547949
4 Bishopgate Street	II		House	1830–1835	24 June 1983	SE6024651170; 53°57′11″N 1°05′00″W	1259543	4 Bishopgate Street More images	Q26550648
5 Bishopgate Street	II		House	1830–1835	24 June 1983	SE6024251166; 53°57′11″N 1°05′01″W	1259544	5 Bishopgate Street More images	Q26550649
6 Bishopgate Street	II		House	1830–1835	19 August 1971	SE6023751158; 53°57′11″N 1°05′01″W	1259545	6 Bishopgate Street More images	Q26550650
Number 37 and Fulford Grange and the Croft	II	Grange Garth	House	c. 1830–1840	19 August 1971	SE6071850720; 53°56′57″N 1°04′35″W	1257661	Number 37 and Fulford Grange and the Croft More images	Q26548996
Former Abbey Park Hotel	II	77–79 The Mount	House	1831–32	14 June 1954	SE5954551194; 53°57′12″N 1°05′39″W	1256447	Former Abbey Park Hotel	Q26547960
Church of St Stephen	II	York Road, Acomb	Church	1831–32	24 June 1983	SE5725551444; 53°57′21″N 1°07′44″W	1256233	Church of St Stephen More images	Q26547771
306 Tadcaster Road	II		House	1833	24 June 1983	SE5891050128; 53°56′38″N 1°06′14″W	1256497	306 Tadcaster Road	Q26547999
121 The Mount	II		House	1833	21 April 1983	SE5938650969; 53°57′05″N 1°05′48″W	1256421	Upload Photo	Q26547935
Ambassador Hotel	II	123–125 The Mount	House	1833	21 April 1983	SE5937250948; 53°57′04″N 1°05′48″W	1256423	Ambassador Hotel More images	Q26547937
127 The Mount	II		House	1833	21 April 1983	SE5935650931; 53°57′04″N 1°05′49″W	1256426	127 The Mount More images	Q26547940
117 and 119 The Mount	II		House	1833–34	21 April 1983	SE5941751002; 53°57′06″N 1°05′46″W	1256455	117 and 119 The Mount More images	Q26547968
Cumberland House	II	20 Mount Parade	House	c. 1834	14 June 1954	SE5931251181; 53°57′12″N 1°05′52″W	1257169	Cumberland House	Q26548567
The Lodge	II	2 Grange Garth	House	c. 1835	19 August 1971	SE6078150817; 53°57′00″N 1°04′31″W	1257701	The Lodge More images	Q26549033
Garrow Hill	II	Heslington Road	House	c. 1835	24 June 1983	SE6170750980; 53°57′04″N 1°03′40″W	1257648	Upload Photo	Q26548983
130 Holgate Road	II		House	c. 1835	24 June 1983	SE5896751284; 53°57′15″N 1°06′10″W	1257574	130 Holgate Road	Q26548915
17–20 Queen Street	II		House	c. 1835	24 June 1983	SE5964551493; 53°57′22″N 1°05′33″W	1256826	17–20 Queen Street More images	Q26548264
Gate piers, walls and railings to north west of numbers 117 and 119	II	The Mount	Gate piers	c. 1835	14 March 1997	SE5939551015; 53°57′07″N 1°05′47″W	1256458	Upload Photo	Q26547971
The Punch Bowl Hotel	II	2 Nunnery Lane	Public house	c. 1835 and c. 1863	19 August 1971	SE5975351431; 53°57′20″N 1°05′27″W	1259524	The Punch Bowl Hotel More images	Q26550631
126 Holgate Road	II		House	c. 1835–1840	24 June 1983	SE5900551279; 53°57′15″N 1°06′08″W	1257573	126 Holgate Road	Q26548914
Priory House	II	46 St Paul's Square	House	c. 1835–1840	24 June 1983	SE5901651281; 53°57′15″N 1°06′08″W	1256754	Priory House	Q26548207
89 The Mount	II		House	Early to mid-19th century	2 February 1972	SE5952151156; 53°57′11″N 1°05′40″W	1256449	89 The Mount More images	Q26547962
9 and 11 Park Street	II		House	1835–1840	24 June 1983	SE5962651157; 53°57′11″N 1°05′34″W	1257016	Upload Photo	Q26548435
7 Park Street	II		House	1836	24 June 1983	SE5961151170; 53°57′12″N 1°05′35″W	1257014	Upload Photo	Q26548433
York Cemetery Chapel	II*	Cemetery Road	Chapel	1837	1 July 1968	SE6107550824; 53°57′00″N 1°04′15″W	1259304	York Cemetery Chapel More images	Q17550038
York Cemetery railings, gates, gate piers and terminal piers on west boundary	II	Cemetery Road	Railings	1837	24 June 1983	SE6094950811; 53°56′59″N 1°04′22″W	1259306	Upload Photo	Q26550437
York Cemetery Lodge	II	49 Cemetery Road	Lodge	1837	24 June 1983	SE6097650865; 53°57′01″N 1°04′21″W	1259303	Upload Photo	Q26550435
York Cemetery plot number 11847 Gray monument	II	Cemetery Road	Monument	1837	14 March 1997	SE6117550823; 53°57′00″N 1°04′10″W	1259309	York Cemetery plot number 11847 Gray monument More images	Q26550440
Fishergate House	II	Fishergate	House	1837	17 January 1980	SE6068850969; 53°57′05″N 1°04′36″W	1257845	Fishergate House More images	Q26549163
York and North Midland Railway Company workshops and water tank at NGR SE 5951 5144	II	Queen Street	Workshop	1839	14 March 1997	SE5955051456; 53°57′21″N 1°05′38″W	1256827	York and North Midland Railway Company workshops and water tank at NGR SE 5951 5144 More images	Q26548265
27 Blossom Street	II		House	c. 1840	24 June 1983	SE5969351359; 53°57′18″N 1°05′31″W	1259491	27 Blossom Street More images	Q26550600
Garden Cottage	II	32 Grange Garth	House	c. 1840	24 June 1983	SE6062650770; 53°56′58″N 1°04′40″W	1257702	Garden Cottage More images	Q26549034
26 Holgate Road	II		House	c. 1840	24 June 1983	SE5948851287; 53°57′15″N 1°05′42″W	1257583	26 Holgate Road More images	Q26548923
County stand at York Racecourse	II	Knavesmire	Stand	c. 1840	11 January 1995	SE5966649806; 53°56′27″N 1°05′33″W	1257527	County stand at York Racecourse More images	Q26548873
16 and 17 Mount Parade	II		House	c. 1840	19 August 1971	SE5934251187; 53°57′12″N 1°05′50″W	1257165	16 and 17 Mount Parade	Q26548563
Mount House	II	18 Mount Parade	House	c. 1840	19 August 1971	SE5933051193; 53°57′12″N 1°05′51″W	1257166	Mount House	Q26548564
Garden wall, railings, gate and gate posts fronting number 20 (Cumberland House)	II	Mount Parade	Wall	c. 1840	14 March 1997	SE5931651189; 53°57′12″N 1°05′51″W	1257170	Garden wall, railings, gate and gate posts fronting number 20 (Cumberland House)	Q26548568
Herdsman's Cottage	II	159 Mount Vale	House	c. 1840	24 June 1983	SE5921950730; 53°56′57″N 1°05′57″W	1257144	Herdsman's Cottage More images	Q26548544
216 Mount Vale	II		House	c. 1840	14 March 1997	SE5916450718; 53°56′57″N 1°06′00″W	1257154	216 Mount Vale	Q26548553
4 Scarcroft Lane	II		House	c. 1840	24 June 1983	SE5982551211; 53°57′13″N 1°05′23″W	1256666	4 Scarcroft Lane More images	Q26548138
Number 116 and attached walls and railings	II	The Mount	House	c. 1840	10 September 1970	SE5945951156; 53°57′11″N 1°05′44″W	1256453	Number 116 and attached walls and railings	Q26547966
118 The Mount	II		House	c. 1840	10 September 1970	SE5945151152; 53°57′11″N 1°05′44″W	1256459	118 The Mount	Q26547972
126 The Mount	II		House	c. 1840	10 September 1970	SE5943151134; 53°57′10″N 1°05′45″W	1256425	126 The Mount	Q26547939
128 The Mount	II		House	c. 1840	10 September 1970	SE5942751129; 53°57′10″N 1°05′45″W	1256427	128 The Mount	Q26547941
103 Heslington Road	II		House	c. 1840–1850	24 June 1983	SE6139551049; 53°57′07″N 1°03′57″W	1257678	103 Heslington Road More images	Q26549013
York Cemetery plot number 13092 Leadbetter monument	II	Cemetery Road	Monument	1841	14 March 1997	SE6103250815; 53°56′59″N 1°04′18″W	1259311	Upload Photo	Q26550442
120 The Mount	II		House	1842–43	10 September 1970	SE5944751148; 53°57′11″N 1°05′44″W	1256460	120 The Mount	Q26547973
124 The Mount	II		House	1843	10 September 1970	SE5943751139; 53°57′11″N 1°05′45″W	1256424	124 The Mount More images	Q26547938
The Woolpack public house	II	6 Fawcett Street	Public house	c. 1845	24 June 1983	SE6075151177; 53°57′11″N 1°04′33″W	1257862	The Woolpack public house More images	Q26549177
Mill Mount Lodge	II	Mill Mount, Micklegate	House	c. 1845	4 August 2003	SE5947351021; 53°57′07″N 1°05′43″W	1390549	Mill Mount Lodge More images	Q26669940
The Hill Hotel	II	60 York Road, Acomb	House	c. 1845	25 November 1980	SE5733051385; 53°57′19″N 1°07′40″W	1256231	The Hill Hotel	Q26547769
Number 28 and attached wall and railings	II	Holgate Road	House	c. 1845–1850	24 June 1983	SE5948051278; 53°57′15″N 1°05′42″W	1257584	Number 28 and attached wall and railings More images	Q26548924
40 and 42 Holgate Road	II		House	c. 1845–1850	14 March 1997	SE5944751263; 53°57′15″N 1°05′44″W	1257586	40 and 42 Holgate Road More images	Q26548926
62 Holgate Road	II		House	c. 1845–1850	4 March 1997	SE5938251242; 53°57′14″N 1°05′48″W	1257589	62 Holgate Road More images	Q26548929
64 Holgate Road	II		House	c. 1845–1850	14 March 1997	SE5937651243; 53°57′14″N 1°05′48″W	1257591	64 Holgate Road More images	Q26548931
The Crystal Palace public house	II	66 Holgate Road	Public house	c. 1845–1850	24 June 1983	SE5937051248; 53°57′14″N 1°05′48″W	1257592	The Crystal Palace public house More images	Q26548932
74 and 76 Holgate Road	II		House	c. 1845–1850	24 June 1983	SE5932751254; 53°57′14″N 1°05′51″W	1257597	74 and 76 Holgate Road More images	Q26548937
78 Holgate Road	II		House	c. 1845–1850	24 June 1983	SE5931751254; 53°57′14″N 1°05′51″W	1257560	78 Holgate Road More images	Q26548901
80 Holgate Road	II		House	c. 1845–1850	24 June 1983	SE5931151254; 53°57′14″N 1°05′52″W	1257561	80 Holgate Road More images	Q26548902
88 and 90 Holgate Road	II		House	c. 1845–1850	24 June 1983	SE5928451252; 53°57′14″N 1°05′53″W	1257563	Upload Photo	Q26548904
Numbers 70, 70A and 72 and walls and railings attached numbers 70A and 72	II	Holgate Road	House	1846–47	24 June 1983	SE5934351251; 53°57′14″N 1°05′50″W	1257595	Numbers 70, 70A and 72 and walls and railings attached numbers 70A and 72 More images	Q26548935
Holgate Terrace (part)	II	96–110 Holgate Road	House	1846–1851	24 June 1983	SE5909451262; 53°57′15″N 1°06′04″W	1257568	Holgate Terrace (part)	Q26548909
Holgate Terrace (part)	II	112–118 Holgate Road	House	1846–1851	24 June 1983	SE5908551267; 53°57′15″N 1°06′04″W	1257569	Holgate Terrace (part)	Q26681824
Church of St Edward the Confessor	II	Tadcaster Road, Dringhouses	Church	1847–1849	24 June 1983	SE5877149689; 53°56′24″N 1°06′22″W	1256466	Church of St Edward the Confessor More images	Q26547978
13 and 15 Park Street	II		House	c. 1847–1850	24 June 1983	SE5963051152; 53°57′11″N 1°05′34″W	1257018	Upload Photo	Q26548437
Number 17 and attached railings	II	Park Street	House	c. 1847–1850	24 June 1983	SE5963851141; 53°57′11″N 1°05′34″W	1257021	Upload Photo	Q26548440
19 Park Street	II		House	c. 1847–1850	24 June 1983	SE5965151132; 53°57′10″N 1°05′33″W	1257022	Upload Photo	Q26548441
62 York Road	II	Acomb	School	1848	24 June 1983	SE5729751397; 53°57′20″N 1°07′42″W	1256232	62 York Road	Q26547770
122 The Mount	II		House	1848–49	10 September 1970	SE5944251143; 53°57′11″N 1°05′45″W	1256422	122 The Mount More images	Q26547936
The Wellington Inn	II	47 Alma Terrace	Public house	c. 1850	9 March 1994	SE6068450528; 53°56′50″N 1°04′37″W	1259535	The Wellington Inn More images	Q26550642
The Rise	II	Belle Vue Terrace	House	c. 1850	24 June 1983	SE6129651040; 53°57′07″N 1°04′03″W	1259540	The Rise More images	Q26550645
31 and 33 Blossom Street	II		Shop	c. 1850	19 August 1971	SE5968251348; 53°57′17″N 1°05′31″W	1259493	31 and 33 Blossom Street More images	Q26550602
The Mount School nineteenth century block	II	Dalton Terrace	School	c. 1850	24 June 1983	SE5931151071; 53°57′08″N 1°05′52″W	1257912	The Mount School nineteenth century block More images	Q26549218
York Cemetery plot number 1977 Terry monument	II	Cemetery Road	Monument	c. 1850	14 March 1997	SE6114550904; 53°57′02″N 1°04′11″W	1259308	Upload Photo	Q26550439
120 and 122 Holgate Road	II		House	c. 1850	24 June 1983	SE5906351274; 53°57′15″N 1°06′05″W	1257570	Upload Photo	Q26548911
Holgate Hill Hotel	II	124 Holgate Road	House	c. 1850	24 June 1983	SE5904151287; 53°57′16″N 1°06′06″W	1257572	Upload Photo	Q26548913
All Saints School	II*	Mill Mount	House	c. 1850	24 June 1983	SE5951150967; 53°57′05″N 1°05′41″W	1257280	All Saints School More images	Q17549683
Former coach house and attached stableyard gateway	II	Mill Mount	Coach house	c. 1850	24 June 1983	SE5950551002; 53°57′06″N 1°05′41″W	1257282	Upload Photo	Q26548660
Forecourt walls, gates and railings to numbers 9–15 (odd)	II	Park Street	Wall	c. 1850	24 June 1983	SE5962251146; 53°57′11″N 1°05′35″W	1257019	Upload Photo	Q26548438
92 Holgate Road	II		House	1850–51	24 June 1983	SE5927551251; 53°57′14″N 1°05′54″W	1257564	Upload Photo	Q26548905
Church of St Paul	II	Holgate Road	Church	1850–51	14 March 1997	SE5917251249; 53°57′14″N 1°05′59″W	1257544	Church of St Paul More images	Q26548886
Forecourt walls, railings and gates to numbers 90 and 92 Holgate Road	II		Wall	Mid-19th century	24 June 1983	SE5927751238; 53°57′14″N 1°05′53″W	1257565	Upload Photo	Q26548906
97 Heslington Road, 2 and 3 Belle Vue Terrace	II		House	Mid-19th century	24 June 1983	SE6126251061; 53°57′07″N 1°04′05″W	1259539	97 Heslington Road, 2 and 3 Belle Vue Terrace More images	Q26550644
Sea Horse Hotel	II	4 Fawcett Street	Public house	Mid-19th century	24 June 1983	SE6074551199; 53°57′12″N 1°04′33″W	1257861	Sea Horse Hotel More images	Q26549176
The Swan public house	II	16 Bishopgate Street	Public house	Mid-19th century	14 April 2010	SE6022351108; 53°57′09″N 1°05′02″W	1393749	The Swan public house More images	Q26672893
180 Fulford Road	II		House	Mid-19th century	24 June 1983	SE6085450573; 53°56′52″N 1°04′27″W	1257804	180 Fulford Road More images	Q26549127
200 and 202 Fulford Road	II		House	Mid-19th century	24 June 1983	SE6086150497; 53°56′49″N 1°04′27″W	1257805	200 and 202 Fulford Road More images	Q26549128
Holly Lodge	II	204–206 Fulford Road	House	Mid-19th century	24 June 1983	SE6086150483; 53°56′49″N 1°04′27″W	1257806	Holly Lodge More images	Q26549129
23 and 25 Blossom Street	II		House	Mid-19th century	14 June 1954	SE5970051368; 53°57′18″N 1°05′30″W	1259534	23 and 25 Blossom Street More images	Q26550641
35 Blossom Street	II		Shop	Mid-19th century	24 June 1983	SE5967851343; 53°57′17″N 1°05′31″W	1259495	35 Blossom Street More images	Q26550604
24 Holgate Road	II		House	Mid-19th century	14 March 1997	SE5948851297; 53°57′16″N 1°05′42″W	1257582	24 Holgate Road More images	Q26548922
67 Holgate Road	II		House	Mid-19th century	24 June 1983	SE5935951209; 53°57′13″N 1°05′49″W	1257594	67 Holgate Road More images	Q26548934
Forecourt walls, gates and railings to numbers 74 and 76 Holgate Road	II		Wall	Mid-19th century	24 June 1983	SE5932651239; 53°57′14″N 1°05′51″W	1257557	Forecourt walls, gates and railings to numbers 74 and 76 Holgate Road More images	Q26548898
137 Holgate Road	II		House	Mid-19th century	14 March 1997	SE5889451266; 53°57′15″N 1°06′14″W	1257575	137 Holgate Road	Q26548916
Gate, gate piers and front garden wall to number 137 Holgate Road	II		Gate	Mid-19th century	14 March 1997	SE5886451322; 53°57′17″N 1°06′16″W	1257576	Upload Photo	Q26548917
Mill Mount House and attached railings	II	Mill Mount	House	Mid-19th century	24 June 1983	SE5944851037; 53°57′07″N 1°05′44″W	1257283	Mill Mount House and attached railings More images	Q26548661
12–15 Mount Parade	II		House	Mid-19th century	19 August 1971	SE5934751184; 53°57′12″N 1°05′50″W	1257164	12–15 Mount Parade	Q26548562
Forecourt wall, railings and gate to number 19	II	Park Street	Wall	Mid-19th century	24 June 1983	SE5964551126; 53°57′10″N 1°05′33″W	1257025	Upload Photo	Q26548444
Numbers 4–7 (consecutive) and attached walls and railings	II	St Paul's Square	House	Mid-19th century	24 June 1983	SE5912251349; 53°57′18″N 1°06′02″W	1256737	Numbers 4–7 (consecutive) and attached walls and railings	Q26548190
Numbers 8–11 (consecutive) and attached walls and railings	II	St Paul's Square	House	Mid-19th century	24 June 1983	SE5913351368; 53°57′18″N 1°06′01″W	1256739	Numbers 8–11 (consecutive) and attached walls and railings	Q26548192
Number 12 and attached walls and railings	II	St Paul's Square	House	Mid-19th century	24 June 1983	SE5913651375; 53°57′18″N 1°06′01″W	1256740	Number 12 and attached walls and railings	Q26548193
Numbers 15, 16 and 17 and attached walls and railings	II	St Paul's Square	House	Mid-19th century	24 June 1983	SE5912351396; 53°57′19″N 1°06′02″W	1256742	Numbers 15, 16 and 17 and attached walls and railings	Q26548195
Numbers 19–25 (consecutive) and attached walls and railings	II	St Paul's Square	House	Mid-19th century	24 June 1983	SE5907851439; 53°57′20″N 1°06′04″W	1256745	Numbers 19–25 (consecutive) and attached walls and railings	Q26548198
Numbers 28 and 29 and attached walls and railings	II	St Paul's Square	House	Mid-19th century	24 June 1983	SE5904951410; 53°57′20″N 1°06′06″W	1256746	Numbers 28 and 29 and attached walls and railings	Q26548199
Numbers 30 and 31 and attached walls and railings	II	St Paul's Square	House	Mid-19th century	24 June 1983	SE5904651389; 53°57′19″N 1°06′06″W	1256748	Numbers 30 and 31 and attached walls and railings	Q26548201
38 and 39 St Paul's Square	II		House	Mid-19th century	24 June 1983	SE5903251337; 53°57′17″N 1°06′07″W	1256753	38 and 39 St Paul's Square	Q26548206
Moorlyn	II	292 Tadcaster Road	House	Mid-19th century	24 June 1983	SE5896750277; 53°56′43″N 1°06′11″W	1256496	Moorlyn	Q26547998
294 Tadcaster Road	II		House	Mid-19th century	3 June 1983	SE5896250255; 53°56′42″N 1°06′11″W	1256498	294 Tadcaster Road	Q26548000
54, 56 and 58 The Mount	II		Shop	Mid-19th century	24 June 1983	SE5957951307; 53°57′16″N 1°05′37″W	1256441	54, 56 and 58 The Mount More images	Q26547954
Numbers 63, 65 and 67 and attached railings	II		House	Mid-19th century	14 March 1997	SE5957951239; 53°57′14″N 1°05′37″W	1256442	Numbers 63, 65 and 67 and attached railings More images	Q26547955
90 The Mount	II		House	Mid-19th century	14 June 1954	SE5950851213; 53°57′13″N 1°05′41″W	1256450	Upload Photo	Q26547963
Number 107 and attached railings	II	The Mount	House	Mid-19th century	14 March 1997	SE5945551082; 53°57′09″N 1°05′44″W	1256456	Number 107 and attached railings More images	Q26547969
134 The Mount	II		House	Mid and late 19th century	10 September 1970	SE5941451114; 53°57′10″N 1°05′46″W	1256436	134 The Mount	Q26547950
Stables and coach house with attached mortuary, in the grounds of The Retreat	II	Heslington Road	Outbuildings	Mid-19th century (stables and coach house); early 20th century (mortuary)	4 October 2018	SE6164350826; 53°57′00″N 1°03′44″W	1460063	Stables and coach house with attached mortuary, in the grounds of The Retreat More images	Q66479956
Numbers 52 and 54 and branch library	II	Tadcaster Road, Dringhouses	School	1852	24 June 1983	SE5867649618; 53°56′22″N 1°06′28″W	1256464	Numbers 52 and 54 and branch library More images	Q26547976
3 Blossom Street	II		School	1853	24 June 1983	SE5976451448; 53°57′20″N 1°05′27″W	1259523	3 Blossom Street More images	Q26550630
Numbers 7 and 9 and attached wall and railings	II	Acomb Road	House	c. 1860	24 June 1983	SE5866551398; 53°57′19″N 1°06′27″W	1259566	Numbers 7 and 9 and attached wall and railings More images	Q26550668
1 Bishopgate Street	II		House	c. 1860	24 June 1983	SE6029551209; 53°57′12″N 1°04′58″W	1259541	1 Bishopgate Street More images	Q26550646
3 Bishopgate Street	II		House	c. 1860	24 June 1983	SE6025051174; 53°57′11″N 1°05′00″W	1259542	3 Bishopgate Street More images	Q26550647
College House and 1, 2 and 3 Driffield Terrace and attached railings, walls and gate piers	II		House	c. 1860	14 March 1997	SE5934251039; 53°57′07″N 1°05′50″W	1257894	College House and 1, 2 and 3 Driffield Terrace and attached railings, walls and gate piers	Q26549204
51, 53 and 55 Holgate Road	II		House	c. 1860	24 June 1983	SE5940451198; 53°57′13″N 1°05′47″W	1257587	51, 53 and 55 Holgate Road More images	Q26548927
188–194 Mount Vale	II		House	c. 1860	14 March 1997	SE5921450797; 53°57′00″N 1°05′57″W	1257146	188–194 Mount Vale	Q26548546
196–202 Mount Vale	II		House	c. 1860	14 March 1997	SE5919250764; 53°56′59″N 1°05′58″W	1257153	196–202 Mount Vale	Q26548552
27 Park Street	II		House	c. 1860	24 June 1983	SE5969651106; 53°57′09″N 1°05′31″W	1257026	Upload Photo	Q26548445
Numbers 1, 2 and 3 and attached walls and railings	II	St Paul's Square	House	c. 1860	24 June 1983	SE5910751319; 53°57′17″N 1°06′03″W	1256736	Numbers 1, 2 and 3 and attached walls and railings	Q26548189
Number 18 and attached walls and railings	II	St Paul's Square	House	c. 1860	24 June 1983	SE5910851414; 53°57′20″N 1°06′03″W	1256743	Number 18 and attached walls and railings	Q26548196
Numbers 32 and 33 and attached walls and railings	II	St Paul's Square	House	c. 1860	24 June 1983	SE5904551384; 53°57′19″N 1°06′06″W	1256749	Upload Photo	Q26548202
Number 34 and attached walls and railings	II	St Paul's Square	House	c. 1860	5 June 1978	SE5904551368; 53°57′18″N 1°06′06″W	1256750	Upload Photo	Q26548203
Numbers 5, 6 and 7 and attached railings, walls and gate piers	II	Driffield Terrace	House	c. 1860	14 March 1997	SE5927850958; 53°57′05″N 1°05′54″W	1257895	Numbers 5, 6 and 7 and attached railings, walls and gate piers More images	Q26549205
150 The Mount	II		House	c. 1860–1870	24 June 1983	SE5936551068; 53°57′08″N 1°05′49″W	1256438	150 The Mount More images	Q26547952
York Cemetery plot number 16404 Leetham monument	II	Cemetery Road	Monument	1861	14 March 1997	SE6121450860; 53°57′01″N 1°04′08″W	1259314	York Cemetery plot number 16404 Leetham monument More images	Q26550444
The Moat Hotel	II	Nunnery Lane	Hospital	1862	14 March 1997	SE5999051279; 53°57′15″N 1°05′14″W	1257034	The Moat Hotel More images	Q26548453
2–10 Blossom Street	II		Shop	c. 1863	24 June 1983	SE5972951458; 53°57′21″N 1°05′29″W	1259522	2–10 Blossom Street More images	Q26550629
The Bar Convent and railings attached to front	I	Blossom Street	Convent	c. 1865	14 June 1954	SE5975151353; 53°57′17″N 1°05′27″W	1259503	The Bar Convent and railings attached to front More images	Q4857921
York Cemetery plot number 13302 Knowlson monument	II	Cemetery Road	Monument	c. 1865	14 March 1997	SE6104450816; 53°56′59″N 1°04′17″W	1259312	Upload Photo	Q26550443
1–12 New Walk Terrace	II		House	c. 1865	24 June 1983	SE6073850813; 53°56′59″N 1°04′34″W	1257056	1–12 New Walk Terrace More images	Q26548472
139 Holgate Road	II		House	Mid to late 19th century	14 March 1997	SE5886751283; 53°57′15″N 1°06′16″W	1257577	139 Holgate Road	Q26548918
Milestone approximately 10 metres west of number 211 (number 211 not included)	II	Tadcaster Road, Dringhouses	Milestone	Mid to late 19th century	14 March 1997	SE5825648690; 53°55′52″N 1°06′51″W	1256467	Milestone approximately 10 metres west of number 211 (number 211 not included) More images	Q26547979
Hob Moor milestone at NGR SE 589 502	II	Tadcaster Road	Milestone	Mid to late 19th century	14 March 1997	SE5896450161; 53°56′39″N 1°06′11″W	1256500	Hob Moor milestone at NGR SE 589 502 More images	Q26548002
Railings, gates and piers enclosing central garden	II	St Paul's Square	Railings	Mid to late 19th century and 20th century	14 March 1997	SE5911051373; 53°57′18″N 1°06′03″W	1256756	Railings, gates and piers enclosing central garden	Q26548209
The Lighthorseman Hotel	II	124 Fulford Road	Public house	c. 1870	21 April 1994	SE6077050848; 53°57′01″N 1°04′32″W	1257803	The Lighthorseman Hotel More images	Q26549126
Numbers 35, 36 and 37 and attached walls and railings	II	St Paul's Square	House	c. 1870	24 June 1983	SE5904551366; 53°57′18″N 1°06′06″W	1256751	Numbers 35, 36 and 37 and attached walls and railings	Q26548204
Elm Bank Hotel	II*	The Mount	House	c. 1870	1 July 1968	SE5925650917; 53°57′03″N 1°05′55″W	1256439	Elm Bank Hotel More images	Q17549267
The Mount public house	II	72 The Mount	Public house	c. 1870	14 March 1997	SE5953751249; 53°57′14″N 1°05′39″W	1256445	The Mount public house More images	Q26547958
Convent of St Joseph and precinct walls	II	Lawrence Street	Convent	1870–1875	22 May 2013	SE6142251231; 53°57′13″N 1°03′56″W	1414106	Convent of St Joseph and precinct walls More images	Q26676393
The Church of St Clement	II	Scarcroft Road	Church	1872–1874	17 October 2000	SE6000550953; 53°57′04″N 1°05′14″W	1389686	The Church of St Clement More images	Q26669119
York railway station	II*	Station Road	Railway station	1872–1877	1 July 1968	SE5959751712; 53°57′29″N 1°05′36″W	1256554	York railway station More images	Q2269429
York Cemetery plot number 17945 Hessay monument	II	Cemetery Road	Monument	1874	14 March 1997	SE6125250890; 53°57′02″N 1°04′05″W	1259315	Upload Photo	Q26550445
Former weigh office	II	Leeman Road	Office	1875	8 April 2003	SE5944051856; 53°57′34″N 1°05′44″W	1407456	Former weigh office More images	Q26675934
Gate piers and gates to York Goods Station	II	Leeman Road	Gate	1875	8 April 2003	SE5947051866; 53°57′34″N 1°05′42″W	1407468	Gate piers and gates to York Goods Station More images	Q26675935
Milestone at NGR SE 5739 5139	II	York Road, Acomb	Milestone	Late 19th century	14 March 1997	SE5738451389; 53°57′20″N 1°07′37″W	1256237	Milestone at NGR SE 5739 5139	Q26547775
Clementhorpe Maltings	II	Lower Darnborough Street	Maltings	Late 19th century	4 December 2001	SE6031451014; 53°57′06″N 1°04′57″W	1389599	Clementhorpe Maltings More images	Q26669034
Conservatory at rear of All Saints School	II	Mill Mount	Conservatory	Late 19th century	14 March 1997	SE5948850990; 53°57′06″N 1°05′42″W	1257281	Upload Photo	Q26548659
Former North Eastern Railway Goods Station	II	Leeman Road (south east off)	Goods station	1875–1877	8 April 2003	SE5936051842; 53°57′33″N 1°05′49″W	1407453	Former North Eastern Railway Goods Station More images	Q26675933
Bullnose Building, former coal manager's office and house	II	Leeman Road	Office	1876	9 December 2019	SE5947051879; 53°57′35″N 1°05′42″W	1465077	Bullnose Building, former coal manager's office and house More images	Q97386374
Imphal Barracks the Keep	II	Fulford Road	Armoury	1877–1880	24 June 1983	SE6090050150; 53°56′38″N 1°04′25″W	1257808	Imphal Barracks the Keep More images	Q26549131
The Fox Inn	II	168 Holgate Road	Public house	1878	9 March 1994	SE5874651399; 53°57′19″N 1°06′23″W	1257540	The Fox Inn More images	Q26548882
Royal York Hotel and area railings attached at side and rear	II	Station Road	Hotel	1878–1896	24 June 1983	SE5966651780; 53°57′31″N 1°05′32″W	1256559	Royal York Hotel and area railings attached at side and rear More images	Q7761744
Skeldergate Bridge and attached tollhouse, abutment walls and steps	II	Skeldergate	Bridge	1879–1881	1 July 1968	SE6038451285; 53°57′15″N 1°04′53″W	1256602	Skeldergate Bridge and attached tollhouse, abutment walls and steps More images	Q26548084
Church of St Lawrence	II	Lawrence Street	Church	1881–1893	24 June 1983	SE6120351258; 53°57′14″N 1°04′08″W	1257509	Church of St Lawrence More images	Q18210399
Lychgate to Church of St Stephen	II	York Road, Acomb	Lychgate	1882	24 June 1983	SE5732051374; 53°57′19″N 1°07′41″W	1256235	Lychgate to Church of St Stephen More images	Q26547773
Leeman statue	II	Station Avenue	Statue	1885	24 June 1983	SE5980851833; 53°57′33″N 1°05′24″W	1256597	Leeman statue More images	Q26548079
Castle Mills Lock	II	Castle Mills	Lock	1889 (rebuilt)	14 March 1997	SE6060551279; 53°57′15″N 1°04′41″W	1259357	Castle Mills Lock More images	Q26550478
Press stand at York Racecourse	II	Knavesmire	Stand	c. 1890	11 January 1995	SE5965149831; 53°56′28″N 1°05′34″W	1257533	Press stand at York Racecourse More images	Q26548877
Fishergate County Primary School	II	Fishergate	School	1893–1895	14 March 1997	SE6076551030; 53°57′07″N 1°04′32″W	1257844	Fishergate County Primary School More images	Q26549162
Former junior school building at Acomb County Primary School and attached railing	II	Front Street, Acomb	School	1894	30 September 1992	SE5752851359; 53°57′18″N 1°07′29″W	1257801	Former junior school building at Acomb County Primary School and attached railing More images	Q26549124
Ellen Wilson Hospital, numbers 1–6 (consecutive) and attached walls and railings	II	Lawrence Street	House	1894	24 June 1983	SE6119851328; 53°57′16″N 1°04′08″W	1257510	Ellen Wilson Hospital, numbers 1–6 (consecutive) and attached walls and railings More images	Q26548859
Aldersyde and attached conservatory	II	Old Moor Lane	House	1895–96	9 February 1999	SE5834949098; 53°56′05″N 1°06′46″W	1245577	Aldersyde and attached conservatory	Q26538094
Scarcroft County Primary School	II*	Scarcroft Road	School	1896	1 July 1968	SE5981651116; 53°57′10″N 1°05′24″W	1256667	Scarcroft County Primary School More images	Q115925897
Playground walls, gates and railings to Scarcroft County Primary School	II	Scarcroft Road	Wall	1896	14 March 1997	SE5979551093; 53°57′09″N 1°05′25″W	1256669	Playground walls, gates and railings to Scarcroft County Primary School More images	Q26548139
Stable approximately 10 metres to rear of number 47 the Wellington Inn	II	Alma Terrace	Stable	1897	9 March 1994	SE6067450518; 53°56′50″N 1°04′37″W	1259536	Upload Photo	Q26550643
Ousefield	II	Fulford Road	House	1899	6 May 1997	SE6080849951; 53°56′32″N 1°04′30″W	1256238	Ousefield More images	Q26547776
Horse drinking trough approximately 31 metres south of numbers 29 and 31	II	Lawrence Street	Trough	Late 19th or early 20th century	24 June 1983	SE6121951347; 53°57′17″N 1°04′07″W	1257501	Horse drinking trough approximately 31 metres south of numbers 29 and 31 More images	Q26548850
The Cottage and attached walls and railings	II	Dalton Terrace	House	c. 1900	14 March 1997	SE5924251164; 53°57′11″N 1°05′55″W	1257911	The Cottage and attached walls and railings	Q26549217
63 and 65 Lawrence Street	II		House	c. 1900	24 June 1983	SE6134651358; 53°57′17″N 1°04′00″W	1257505	63 and 65 Lawrence Street More images	Q26548854
Taxi kiosk in north east corner of railway station portico	II	Station Road	Kiosk	c. 1900	14 March 1997	SE5966751719; 53°57′29″N 1°05′32″W	1256557	Taxi kiosk in north east corner of railway station portico More images	Q26548043
Summerhouse approximately 50 metres west of number 107 the Retreat hospital	II	Heslington Road	Summerhouse	c. 1900 (probable)	14 March 1997	SE6148550982; 53°57′05″N 1°03′53″W	1257681	Summerhouse approximately 50 metres west of number 107 the Retreat hospital More images	Q26549016
Poppleton Road School	II	Poppleton Road	School	1903–04	1 July 1968	SE5812652187; 53°57′45″N 1°06′56″W	1256903	Poppleton Road School More images	Q26548328
Danesmead	II	262 Fulford Road	House	1904	6 May 1997	SE6083650030; 53°56′34″N 1°04′29″W	1256240	Danesmead More images	Q26547778
Queen Victoria statue	II	West Bank Park, Holgate	Statue	1905	24 June 1983	SE5837151264; 53°57′15″N 1°06′43″W	1256224	Queen Victoria statue More images	Q26547763
Bishopsbarns and garden wall and gates attached at front	II*	27 St George's Place	House	1905	24 June 1983	SE5895750665; 53°56′55″N 1°06′11″W	1256793	Bishopsbarns and garden wall and gates attached at front More images	Q17549546
Lamel Beeches (former medical superintendent's house for The Retreat)	II	105 Heslington Road	House	1908–09	23 October 2024	SE6144051042; 53°57′07″N 1°03′55″W	1489305	Upload Photo	Q136357705
War memorial	II	The Green, Acomb	War memorial	c. 1920	14 March 1997	SE5721251346; 53°57′18″N 1°07′47″W	1256482	War memorial More images	Q26547992
Lychgate and dovecote, Rowntree Park, approximately 70 metres east of the main entrance	II	Richardson Street	Lychgate	1921	24 May 2018	SE6033050668; 53°56′55″N 1°04′56″W	1452680	Lychgate and dovecote, Rowntree Park, approximately 70 metres east of the main entrance More images	Q66479307
Indicator board and clock tower at York Racecourse	II	Knavesmire	Clock tower	1922	4 August 1995	SE5954849712; 53°56′24″N 1°05′40″W	1257531	Indicator board and clock tower at York Racecourse More images	Q26548875
War memorial at the Church of St Edward the Confessor	II	Tadcaster Road, Dringhouses	War memorial	1922	16 March 2018	SE5876349710; 53°56′25″N 1°06′23″W	1454164	War memorial at the Church of St Edward the Confessor More images	Q66479466
Gates and gate piers to War Memorial Garden	II	Leeman Road	Gate	c. 1924	24 June 1983	SE5983051887; 53°57′35″N 1°05′23″W	1257514	Gates and gate piers to War Memorial Garden More images	Q26548861
Liquor factory	II	Bishopthorpe Road	Factory	1924–1930	4 March 2005	SE5986949828; 53°56′28″N 1°05′22″W	1391641	Liquor factory More images	Q26670993
Terry's of York clock tower, water tower and boiler house with transformer house attached	II	Bishopthorpe Road	Tower	1924–1930	4 March 2005	SE5984149832; 53°56′28″N 1°05′24″W	1391642	Terry's of York clock tower, water tower and boiler house with transformer house attached More images	Q26670994
Terry's of York factory	II	Bishopthorpe Road	Factory	1924–1930	4 March 2005	SE5986149781; 53°56′26″N 1°05′22″W	1391643	Terry's of York factory More images	Q26670995
Terry's of York time office block	II	Bishopthorpe Road	Office	1924–1930	4 March 2005	SE5997749797; 53°56′27″N 1°05′16″W	1391644	Terry's of York time office block More images	Q26670996
Terry's of York head offices	II	Bishopthorpe Road	Office	1924–1930	4 March 2005	SE5996049846; 53°56′29″N 1°05′17″W	1391645	Terry's of York head offices More images	Q26670997
York City War Memorial in the War Memorial Garden	II*	Leeman Road	War memorial	1925	10 September 1970	SE5983751919; 53°57′36″N 1°05′22″W	1257512	York City War Memorial in the War Memorial Garden More images	Q22919983
Leeman Road District First World War Memorial	II	Salisbury Road	War memorial	1925	5 March 2014	SE5859952480; 53°57′54″N 1°06′30″W	1419193	Leeman Road District First World War Memorial More images	Q26676710
Walls, railings and gate piers enclosing courtyard to west of Mill Mount House	II	Mill Mount	Wall	Early 20th century	14 March 1997	SE5942251026; 53°57′07″N 1°05′46″W	1257242	Upload Photo	Q26548637
Church of St Chad on the Knavesmire	II	Campleshon Road	Church	1925–26, 1966	20 December 2004	SE5977850091; 53°56′37″N 1°05′27″W	1391178	Church of St Chad on the Knavesmire More images	Q26670547
Goddards and attached gateway, terrace and loggia to side and rear	I	27 Tadcaster Road, Dringhouses	House	1926–27	24 June 1983	SE5891249721; 53°56′25″N 1°06′15″W	1256461	Goddards and attached gateway, terrace and loggia to side and rear More images	Q17530540
Number 25 including carriage entrance	II*	Tadcaster Road, Dringhouses	Lodge	1927	24 June 1983	SE5880149766; 53°56′26″N 1°06′21″W	1256505	Number 25 including carriage entrance More images	Q17549324
Roman Catholic Church of the English Martyrs and attached presbytery	II	Dalton Terrace	Church	1931–32	18 November 2015	SE5928951156; 53°57′11″N 1°05′53″W	1425402	Roman Catholic Church of the English Martyrs and attached presbytery More images	Q26677189
St Clements Church Hall	II	Nunthorpe Road	Church hall	1933	22 July 2003	SE5986951135; 53°57′10″N 1°05′21″W	1390532	St Clements Church Hall More images	Q26669923
The Masons Arms	II	6 Fishergate	Public house	1935	16 February 1996	SE6064451277; 53°57′15″N 1°04′38″W	1257836	The Masons Arms More images	Q26549155
Odeon Cinema and Odeon buildings	II	1–5 Blossom Street	Cinema	1937	23 April 1981	SE5960951351; 53°57′17″N 1°05′35″W	1259501	Odeon Cinema and Odeon buildings More images	Q26550610
Church of the Holy Redeemer	II	Boroughbridge Road, Acomb	Church	1959–1965	25 September 1998	SE5753152580; 53°57′58″N 1°07′28″W	1376606	Church of the Holy Redeemer More images	Q26657146

== See also ==
- Grade I listed buildings in North Yorkshire
- Grade II* listed buildings in North Yorkshire
