= Scarcroft Primary School =

Listed school in York, England

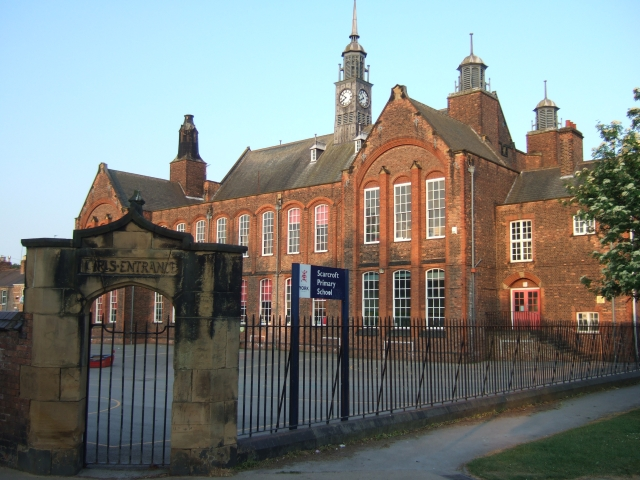
- The school, seen from the east

Location
- Moss Street; South Bank; York, North Yorkshire, YO23 1BS; England; 53.953°N 1.089°W

Information
- Type: Academy
- Established: 1896; 130 years ago
- Local authority: York City Council
- Trust: South Bank Multi Academy Trust
- Department for Education URN: 142637 Tables
- Ofsted: Reports
- Head of School: Jennifer Mitchell
- Gender: Coeducational
- Age: 4 to 11
- Enrollment: 381 (December 2022)
- Website: scarcroft.york.sch.uk

Listed Building – Grade II*
- Official name: Scarcroft County Primary School
- Designated: 1 July 1968
- Reference no.: 1256667

Listed Building – Grade II
- Official name: Playground walls, gates and railings to Scarcroft County Primary School
- Designated: 14 March 1997
- Reference no.: 1256669

Scarcroft Primary School is a coeducational primary school housed in a Grade II* listed building on Moss Street, just south-west of the city centre of York, England.

== History ==
In 1895, the York School Board leased the Victoria Bar Primitive Methodist Connexion mission room on Nunnery Lane for the education of 150 children. In August 1896, this was replaced by the newly built Scarcroft Road Board School, at the north-eastern end of Micklegate Stray. The school was designed to accommodate 1,200 children in 21 classrooms and two halls. Numbers grew slowly, with only 168 children enrolled in 1897, rising to 1,175 by 1910. At the time, it taught both primary and secondary pupils. After the Second World War, the senior section ceased accepting girls, and the building was divided between Scarcroft County Primary School and Scarcroft Secondary Modern Boys School.

The building was designed by Walter Brierley, and Nikolaus Pevsner describes it as "his masterpiece", with "one of the most striking and original elevations in York". It is in the Queen Anne style.

The building is of brick. The central hall range has two tall storeys, with three-storey wings and attics on either side. Smaller wings project from the ends of the main wings. The hall is lit by three large windows, and its roof has corner turrets. There is also a central clock tower. Most of the windows are original, and the interior retains many original fixtures and fittings.

The building was Grade II* listed in 1968. The playground walls, gates and railings, also designed by Brierley, were Grade II listed in 1997.

In 2017, the school was refurbished, with two additional classrooms added within the existing building. Part of the car park was converted into an extra playground.

In 2022, the school had 384 pupils aged between 4 and 11. It is part of the South Bank Multi-Academy Trust, which includes Knavesmire Primary School and Millthorpe School.

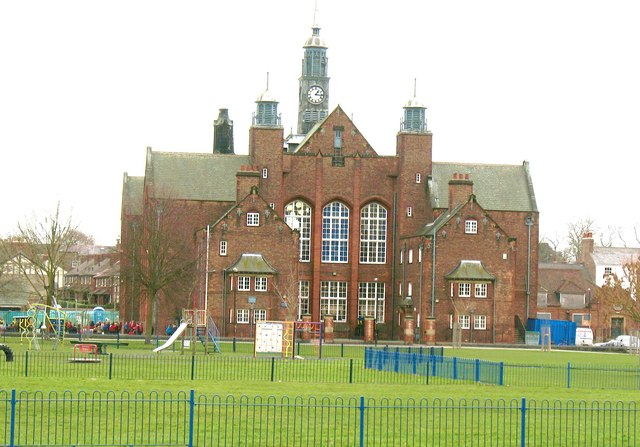
The school, seen from the south

== See also ==
- Grade II* listed buildings in the City of York
- Listed buildings in York (outside the city walls, southern part)
