= The Fox, York =

Listed pub in York, England

The Fox
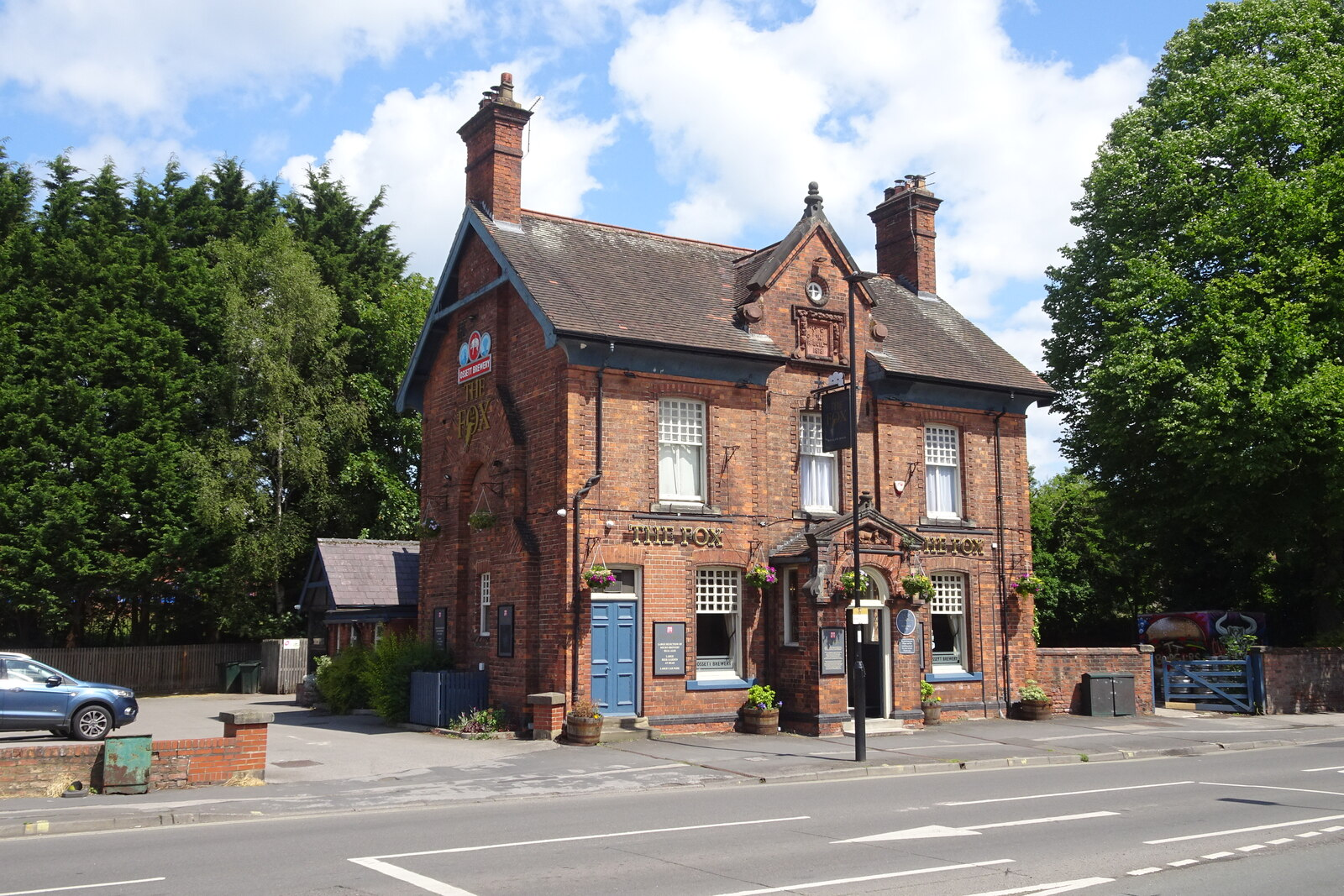
- The pub in 2025
- Interactive map of the The Fox area

General information
- Type: Public house
- Location: 168 Holgate Road, Holgate, York, England
- Coordinates: 53°57′19″N 1°06′23″W
- Year built: 1878; 148 years ago
- Renovated: 1985 (restored)

Design and construction
- Designations

Listed Building – Grade II
- Official name: The Fox Inn
- Designated: 9 March 1994
- Reference no.: 1257836

Renovating team
- Architect: George Williamson (1985)

Website
- Official website

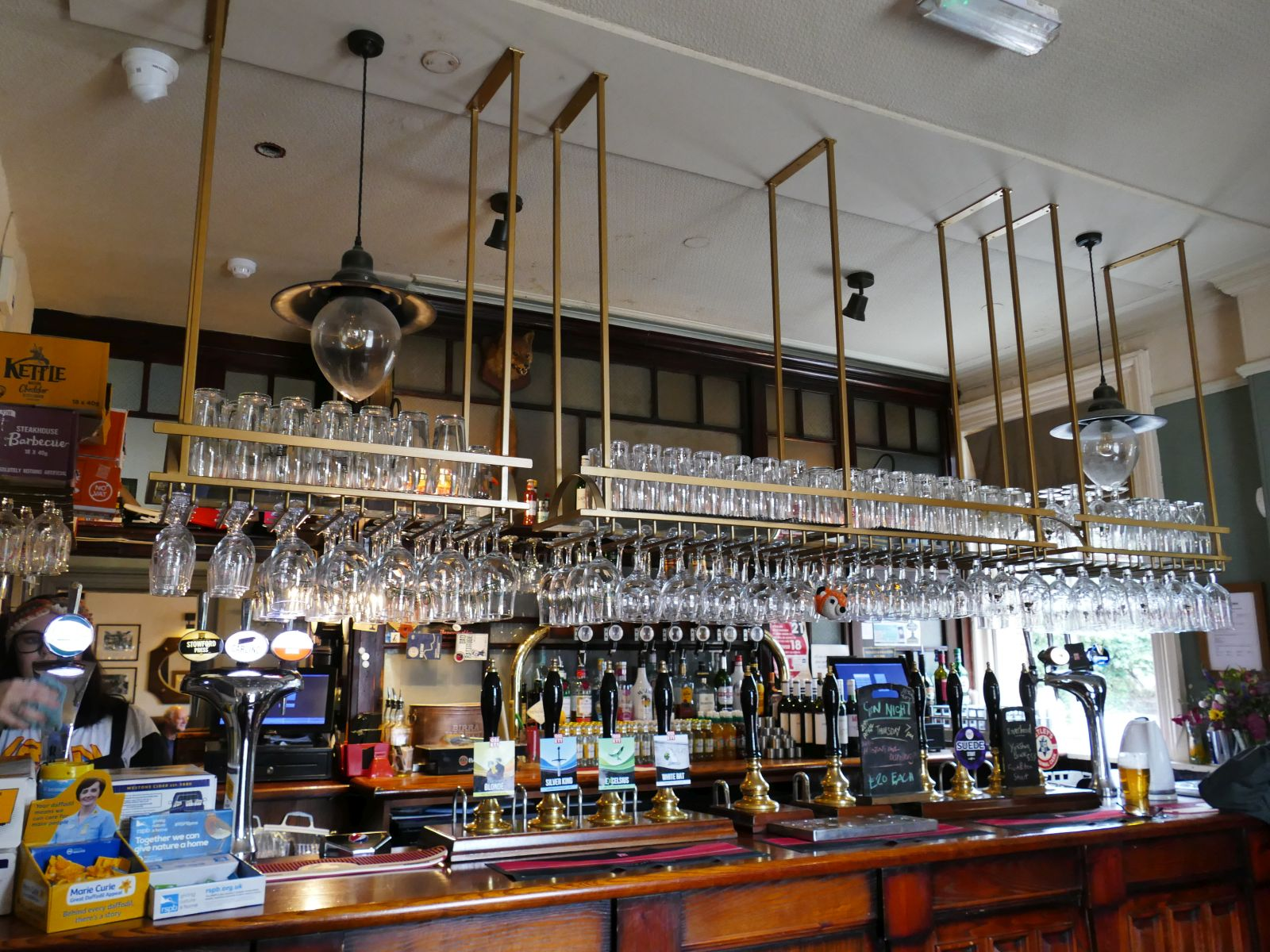
The main bar in the front lounge

The Fox is a public house on Holgate Road in Holgate, a suburb of York, England.

The pub was purpose-built in 1878, replacing an earlier establishment on the site. The York Carriage Works were constructed nearby a few years later, and it long provided the main source of patrons for the business. The pub was owned by Tetley's Brewery for much of its history. In 1985, it was restored under the architect George Williamson and subsequently branded as a Tetley's Heritage Pub. It was Grade II listed in 1994, following a study by the Campaign for Real Ale (CAMRA).

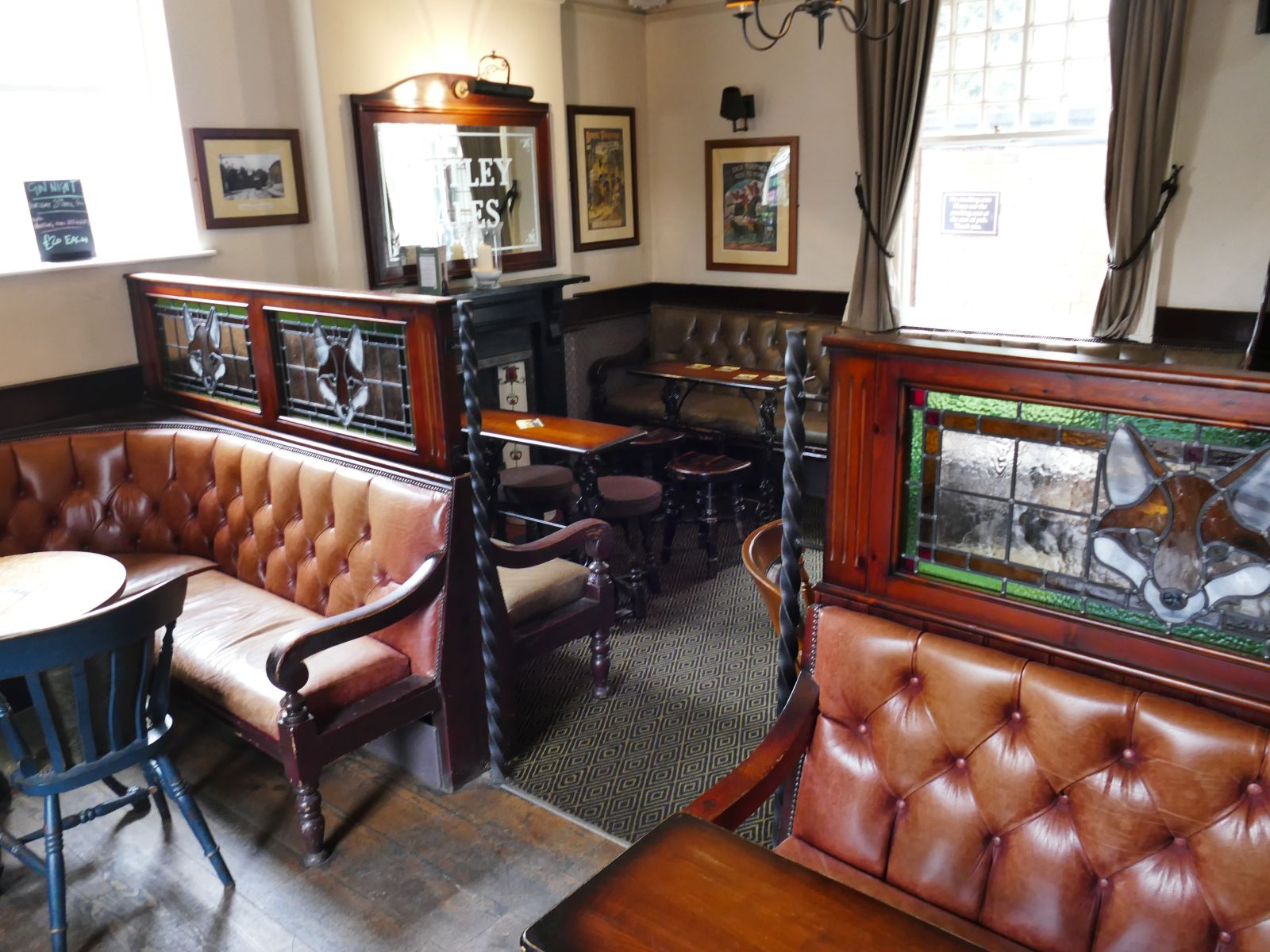
Interior seating

The pub was later sold to Punch Taverns, but closed in 2013 after the rent was increased. A proposal to bring the pub into community ownership suggested opening a post office in the building and selling bacon sandwiches during the day, but this was not taken forward. Instead, it was leased to the Ossett Brewery, which removed the kitchen and children's play area, and redecorated throughout. Each of the four rooms has a different theme: foxes, Holgate, travel, and railways. One room aims to replicate the feel of a railway carriage. On opening, the pub offered nine cask ales, including several from Ossett. By 2022, the pub was listed in the Good Beer Guide.

The two-storey building is constructed of brick, and is three bays wide. A central panel reads "THE FOX INN REBUILT 1878". The main entrance is through a brick porch, while a secondary entrance, formerly used for off-sales, is now blocked. Inside, many original fittings survive, including the bar, benches, fireplaces, corridor hatch, and staircase. The pub is listed on CAMRA's Yorkshire Regional Inventory of Historic Pub Interiors.

== See also ==
- Listed buildings in York (outside the city walls, southern part)
