= 1 Fawcett Street =

Listed former pub in York, England

- The building in 2025
- Interactive map of the 1 Fawcett Street area
- Former names: The Paragon; Market Tavern; Cattle Market Inn
- Alternative names: Toto's

General information
- Status: Converted to restaurant use
- Type: Public house (former); originally a house
- Location: Fawcett Street, York, England
- Coordinates: 53.9537°N 1.0756°W
- Year built: Late 18th century (probable)
- Renovated: c. 1830 (converted); 20th century (altered and extended)
- Closed: 1983 (as a pub)

Design and construction
- Designations

Listed Building – Grade II
- Official name: 1 Fawcett Street
- Designated: 14 March 1997
- Reference no.: 1257860

Website
- totositalian.com

1 Fawcett Street is a Grade II listed former public house at the corner of Fawcett Street and Paragon Street in York, England. Thought to date from the late 18th century, it was converted into a pub around 1830 and later traded under several names, including the Paragon, the Market Tavern and the Cattle Market Inn. The building was included in the Central Historic Core conservation area in 1968. It is now occupied by the Italian restaurant Toto's.

== History ==
The building stands at the corner where Fawcett Street meets Paragon Street, close to Fishergate Bar and the city walls. It is thought to date from the late 18th century and originally served as a house. It was converted into a public house around 1830 and later received 20th‑century alterations and an extension. It has traded under several names, including The Paragon, the Market Tavern, and, in 1838, the Cattle Market Inn.

The 1851 directory of Kingston-upon-Hull and York records Hannah Vause at the Paragon, with the address given as Cattle Market, while the 1885 directory for York lists John Mason at the Cattle Market Tavern, with the address as Cattle Market and Paragon Street. The 1913 Kelly's Directory of the North and East Ridings of Yorkshire records William Henry Jarratt at the Cattle Market Inn on Paragon Street.

In 1968 the site was included within the newly established Central Historic Core conservation area, and on 14 March 1997, the building was designated a Grade II listed structure. Although the English Heritage description recorded the building as a public house when it was listed, anecdotal accounts state that it had closed as a pub in 1983. The premises are now in use as the Italian restaurant Toto's.

== Architecture ==
The building has rendered brickwork above a painted base, with timber surrounds to the doors and windows and a timber cornice along both street fronts. The roof is covered with pantiles and has rendered brick chimneys, one of which is shortened.

On the Fawcett Street side, the front has four bays over two storeys. The doors and windows are set within timber surrounds with simple fluted detailing and small projecting hoods, including one supported on grooved scroll brackets to the right of the main entrance. The central doorway, reached by steps, has six moulded panels; the door at the left end is made of two leaves, each with two panels. The ground‑floor windows are fixed lights with opening top sections, arranged as two lights to the left of the entrance and three to the right. A shaped sill band continues across the right‑hand part of the front. The upper storey has three sash windows with 16 panes each.

The Paragon Street front is also two storeys and has three bays. A blocked door with glazing and panelling stands to the left of two two‑light windows, all matching the treatment on the Fawcett Street side. The first floor contains two 16‑pane sash windows.

== See also ==
- Listed buildings in York (outside the city walls, southern part)
