= English Martyrs Church, York =

Listed church in York, England

Coordinates: 53°57′11″N 1°05′54″W

English Martyrs Church
- The church in 2023
- English Martyrs Church
- OS grid reference: SE 59289 51156
- Location: Dalton Terrace, York, England
- Denomination: Roman Catholic
- Website: englishmartyrsyork.org.uk

History
- Founded: 1881

Architecture
- Heritage designation: Grade II
- Architect(s): Williams & Jopling
- Style: Early Christian style
- Completed: 4 May 1932; 94 years ago

Administration
- Province: Liverpool
- Diocese: Middlesbrough

The English Martyrs Church is a Grade II listed Roman Catholic church on Dalton Terrace in York, England.

The church is dedicated to the memory of the English Martyrs, a group of Catholic men and women who were executed for their faith during the reigns of Henry VIII and Elizabeth I.

The church had previously been at 17 Blossom Street.

== See also ==
- Listed buildings in York (outside the city walls, southern part)
