= St Clement's Church, York =

Listed church in York, England

St Clement's Church
- The church in 2024
- St Clement's Church
- 53.9512°N 1.0872°W
- OS grid reference: SE 60005 50953
- Location: Scarcroft Road, Clementhorpe, York
- Country: England
- Denomination: Church of England
- Website: stclementschurchyork.co.uk

History
- Status: Active
- Dedication: Clement of Rome
- Consecrated: 1874; 152 years ago

Architecture
- Heritage designation: Grade II listed
- Architect: J. B. and W. Atkinson
- Style: Gothic Revival
- Groundbreaking: 1872

Specifications
- Materials: Brick, stone

Administration
- Province: York
- Diocese: York
- Archdeaconry: York
- Deanery: York

St Clement's Church is a Grade II listed parish church on Scarcroft Road in Clementhorpe, a suburb south-west of the city centre of York, England.

A medieval church dedicated to Saint Clement once stood outside the York city walls and gave its name to the suburb. In 1130, the Benedictine Nunnery of St Clement was founded, and the church was later recorded as part of the nunnery complex. The nunnery was dissolved in 1536 (although the nuns were briefly reinstated during the Pilgrimage of Grace), but the church remained in use until 1585, when its parish was merged into St Mary Bishophill Senior. It then fell into ruin, and in 1745 the remaining stone was removed and used to repair the city walls.

Extensive building took place in the area during the 19th century, and a new church was constructed as a chapel of ease to St Mary on a site on Scarcroft Road. Designed by J. B. and W. Atkinson, it was built from 1872 to 1874 and was given its own parish in 1876. A vestry was added in 1880. When St Mary was demolished in 1963, many of its fixtures were moved to St Clement, including monuments and boards, two of which record the terms of John Carr as Lord Mayor of York. The church was Grade II listed in 2000.

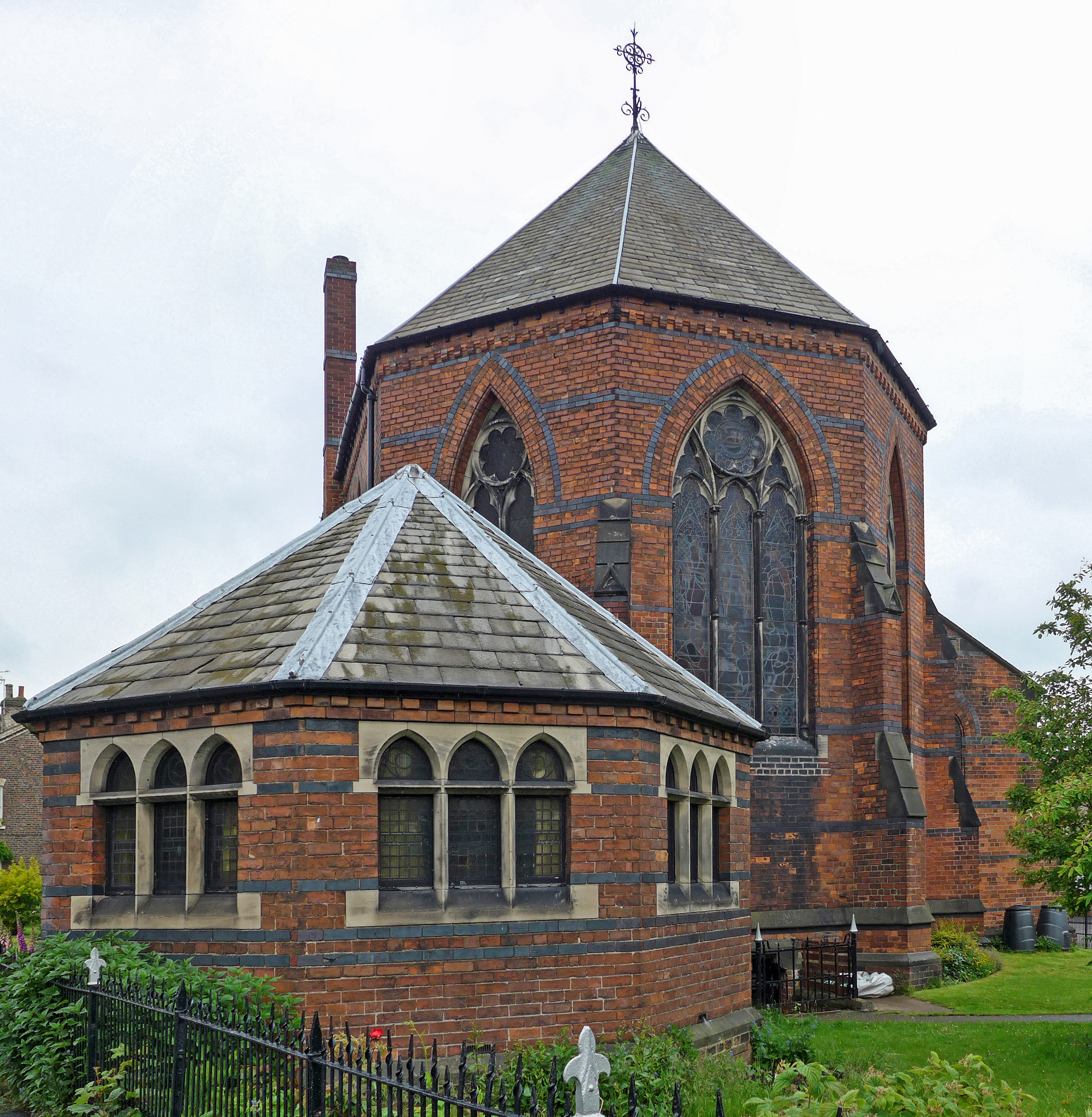
The east end of the church, showing the vestry, in 2015

The church is constructed of red brick with stone dressings and plinth, and dark brick bands. It has angled buttresses and a steep slate roof covering both nave and chancel, topped by a small bellcote. The nave has side aisles, and the east end is apsidal. The windows are lancets, with three-light windows at the east and west ends and two-light windows to either side. The stained glass in the east window was designed by Jean-Baptiste Capronnier in 1875. Inside, the arcades are of brick with stone piers and detailed stone capitals. There is a circular stone font and an octagonal stone pulpit. The choir stalls and screen are later additions designed by Robert Thompson.

== See also ==
- Listed buildings in York (outside the city walls, southern part)
