= Joseph Rowntree (Senior) =

English shopkeeper and Quaker (1801–1859)

Joseph Rowntree (Senior) (10 June 1801 – 4 November 1859) was an English shopkeeper and educationalist.

Rowntree was born in Scarborough, North Yorkshire, England, the son of the Quakers John Rowntree (1757–1827) and his wife, Elizabeth Lotherington (1764–1835). He was educated at two-day schools in Scarborough, his parents not being in a position to send him to the Quaker Ackworth School. By the age of 13 he was assisting his father and his brother John in the grocery business on Bland's Cliff, which his father had established.

In 1822 he started a grocery shop in York, eventually becoming a master grocer.

On 3 May 1832, he married Sarah Stephenson (1807–1888). They had five children. One of these was also called Joseph - Joseph Rowntree (Junior). His oldest son was John Stephenson Rowntree.

The business prospered and in 1845 the family moved to 22-26 Blossom Street, then, in 1848, to 39 Bootham, York.

During the 1850s his two elder sons became partners in the business. Christopher Robinson had joined as a manager and William Hughes was in charge of the apprentices. This gave Joseph the time to channel his energies into a wide range of social and educational issues, which he discussed almost daily with Samuel Tuke (1784–1857).

He was, from 1830 until his death, honorary secretary of the Quaker boys and girls schools in York, and he was largely responsible for their respective moves to Bootham in 1846 and The Mount in 1857. With Tuke, he was a member of the Ackworth School Committee. The death of a young master in the fever epidemic of 1828 (leaving dependents) led him not merely to ensure that the immediate need was met, but to work methodically for the establishment of a financially sound insurance scheme; this resulted in the Friends Provident Institution (1832), the introduction of whose Rules and Regulations needed to make clear to Quakers that life insurance neither implied a distrust of Providence nor was in the nature of a lottery.

He made an impact on both the education of Quaker children, the training of male and female teachers and the education of poor children in York, through the British and Foreign School Society. He was active in municipal reform in York and became an alderman in 1853.

Quaker concerns filled the last period of his life. Statute law provided that marriages according to Quaker usage were valid only if both parties were Quaker members. In 1856, he persuaded the Yorkshire Meeting to ask the national meeting in London to take steps to end this limitation (a proposal that was not popular in more conservative quarters). It was not until 1859 that the Yearly Meeting was prepared to ask Parliament to broaden the provision and the Marriage (Society of Friends) Act 1860 provided for this change. Rowntree died - on 4 November 1859, in York.

== Sources ==
- "Rowntree, Joseph (1801–1859), educationist". Oxford Dictionary of National Biography (online ed.). Oxford University Press. 2004. doi:10.1093/ref:odnb/24231. (Subscription, Wikipedia Library access or UK public library membership required.)
- "Joseph Rowntree (Senior) (1801-1859)". The Rowntree Society.
- Biographical Dictionary of British Quakers in Commerce and Industry 1775–1920; written by Edward H. Milligan; published by William Sessions Ltd
