= St Stephen's Church, Acomb =

Listed church in York, England

St Stephen's Church
- The church in 2023
- St Stephen's Church
- 53.95593°N 1.12896°W
- OS grid reference: SE 57255 51444
- Location: The Green, Acomb, York
- Country: England
- Denomination: Church of England
- Website: acombparish.org

History
- Status: Active
- Dedication: Saint Stephen
- Consecrated: 1832; 194 years ago

Architecture
- Heritage designation: Grade II listed
- Architect: George Townsend Andrews
- Style: Gothic Revival
- Groundbreaking: 1831

Specifications
- Materials: Limestone

Administration
- Province: York
- Diocese: York
- Archdeaconry: York
- Deanery: York

St Stephen's Church is the parish church of Acomb, a suburb of York, England.

A church has stood on the site since the Saxon period, and some remains of the Saxon church were uncovered in 1830. By the time of the Norman Conquest, it was a possession of York Minster. In 1228, it was transferred to the Treasurer of the Minster, and a vicarage was built in 1313. It was transferred to the Crown in 1547.

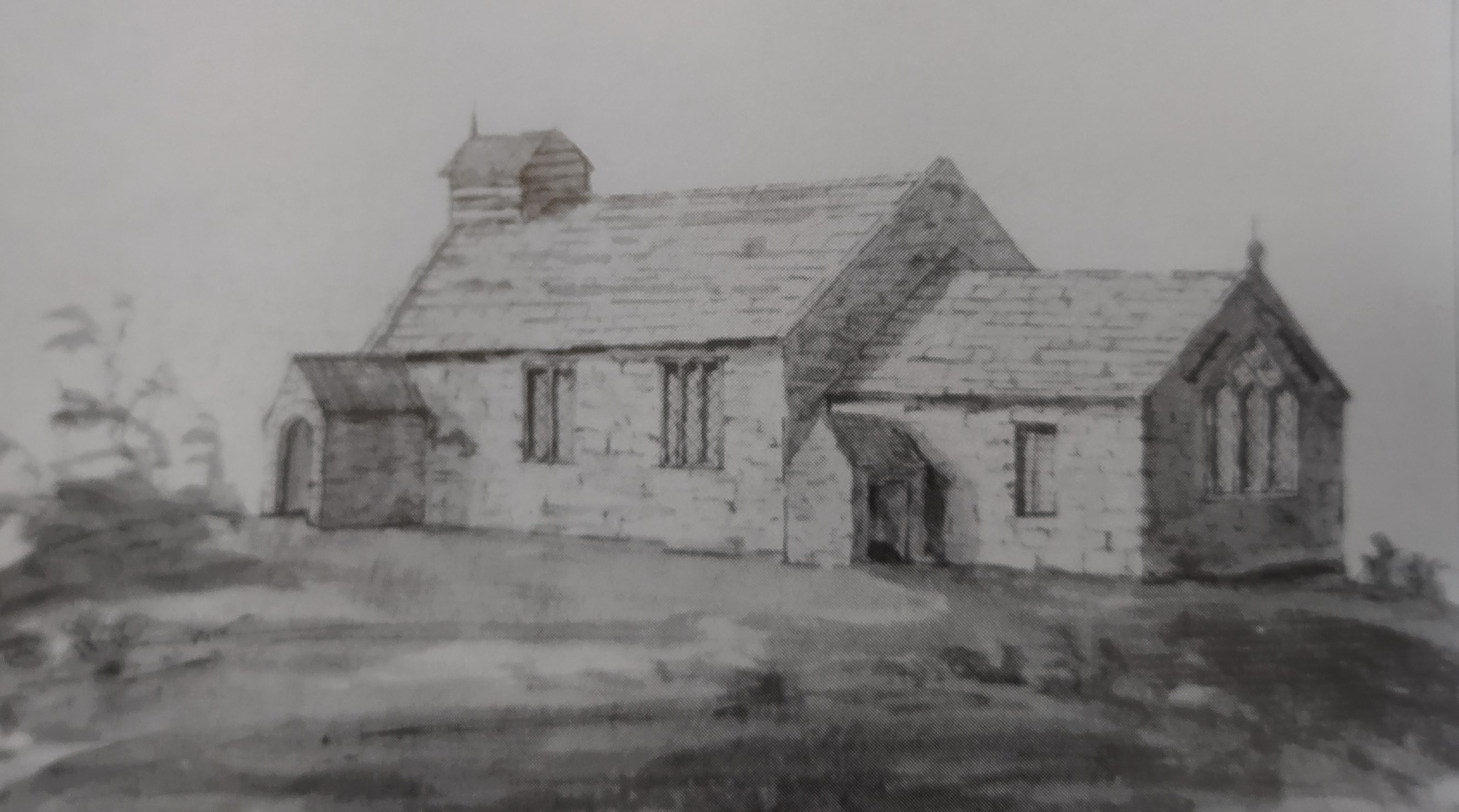
The medieval church, in 1774

By 1830, the church was ruinous, so from 1831 to 1832 it was rebuilt, to a design by George Townsend Andrews. It seated 338 worshippers, partly in two galleries. Cruciform in plan, it was constructed in Tadcaster limestone with a slate roof. The original chancel was retained, but it was rebuilt in 1851. A vestry was added in 1889, and the following year, an east window was added. In the 20th century, a porch was added, as was a lean-to on the north wall.

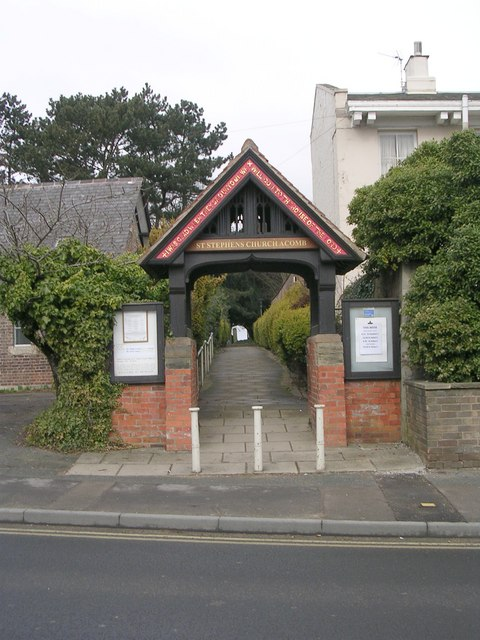
Lychgate at the main entrance to the churchyard

In 1848, it was described as "an elegant structure with a graceful spire, and, standing on the highest ground in the vicinity of York, [it] has a very picturesque appearance". The Royal Commission on Historic Monuments was more critical, describing it as "ostensibly in the Early English style, [but it] shows no real appreciation of mediaeval architecture".

The roof was rebuilt in 1952, and in 1954, a peal of bells was installed, cast in 1770 for St Mary Bishophill Senior. In 1983, the building was Grade II listed. The church suffered a fire in 1992 but was restored soon afterwards, and many of its fixtures and fittings survived. These include stained glass, the oldest of which was made by Edmund Gyles in 1662, depicted the arms of Charles II. The arms of William IV are displayed on a panel in the porch.

== See also ==
- Listed buildings in York (outside the city walls, southern part)
- Listed buildings in York (Acomb Ward)
