= Waggon and Horses =

Listed pub in York, England

- The pub in 2024, with No. 17 on the far left
- Interactive map of the Waggon and Horses area

General information
- Type: House (No. 17) and public house (No. 19), originally a single house later extended
- Location: 19 Lawrence Street, York, England
- Coordinates: 53.9549°N 1.0691°W
- Year built: 1773; 253 years ago
- Renovated: Early 19th century (added); Late 19th century (altered) c. 2007–08 (refurbished)
- Owner: Batemans

Design and construction
- Designations

Listed Building – Grade II
- Official name: The Waggon and Horses public house (number 19)
- Designated: 24 June 1983
- Reference no.: 1257498

Website
- thewaggonyork.com

The Waggon and Horses is a Grade II listed public house and bed and breakfast on Lawrence Street in York, England. Built in 1773 as a house, now No. 17, it stands close to the city walls at Walmgate Bar. The property was extended around 1800, and the later addition, now No. 19, was altered in the late 19th century when it became the pub. The site was included in the Central Historic Core conservation area in 1968. After closing and becoming boarded up in 2007, the building was purchased and refurbished by Batemans. As of July 2026, the freehold is owned by Batemans.

== History ==
The building was constructed on Lawrence Street in 1773 as a house, now No. 17, a date confirmed by the initials and date "W.W. 1773" on a rainwater head. Standing close to the city walls at Walmgate Bar, it was extended around 1800, and the later addition, now No. 19, was altered in the late 19th century when it became the Waggon and Horses public house.

Archival photographs from 1935 show the pub displaying advertisements for John Smith's Magnet Tadcaster Ales, a compound brand line referring to the brewery's Magnet bitter within its wider Tadcaster‑brewed range.

In 1968 the site was included within the newly established Central Historic Core conservation area, and on 24 June 1983, No. 17 and the Waggon and Horses were designated a Grade II listed building.

By late 2007 the pub had closed and was boarded up, and redevelopment proposals were being considered. Its future appeared uncertain until Batemans, a Lincolnshire brewery, purchased and refurbished the building, also creating bed-and-breakfast accommodation on the upper floors. As of July 2026, the freehold is owned by Batemans.

== Architecture ==
The building is mainly brick, with some rendered and painted sections, and has a concrete‑tiled roof. The original house, on the left, is two storeys with an attic and three bays. The two bays to the left show exposed brickwork and have sash windows with curved heads and a brick band between the floors. The middle bay contains an ornate doorway with pilasters, brackets, an open pediment and a fanlight, and the door has six raised panels. The right‑hand bay is rendered and painted, with a sash window on the first floor and a horizontal dormer window above.

Across the ground floor is a public house frontage that continues into the lower right‑hand extension. It has a timber fascia and cornice with pilasters, and glazed panels with etched glass above timber panelling. The extension has a sash window on the first floor. At the far right is another addition with a carriage entrance below and an upper wall of exposed brick supported by a timber lintel, containing two sash windows. There are two chimneys on the ridge of the original house and another on the gable of the first extension.

== See also ==
- Listed buildings in York (outside the city walls, southern part)
