= Cross Keys, Dringhouses =

Listed pub in York, England

Cross Keys
- The pub in 2025
- Interactive map of the Cross Keys area

General information
- Type: Public house
- Location: 32 Tadcaster Road, Dringhouses, York, England
- Coordinates: 53.9404°N 1.1066°W
- Year built: Early 18th century
- Renovated: Late 18th century and 1900 (altered); 2013 and 2023 (refurbished)
- Owner: Greene King

Design and construction
- Designations

Listed Building – Grade II
- Official name: Cross Keys Hotel
- Designated: 24 June 1983
- Reference no.: 1256462

Website
- Official website

The Cross Keys is a Grade II listed public house on Tadcaster Road in Dringhouses, a suburb of York, England. An inn has occupied the site since around 1250, and the present building originated as an early‑18th‑century hotel that was altered and expanded over the following two centuries. The pub was refurbished in 2013 and received further improvements in 2023, and its freehold is owned by Greene King.

== History ==
The building stands on a site where an inn has existed since around 1250. The present structure originated as a hotel on Tadcaster Road, built in the early 18th century. It was altered in the late 18th century, including the addition of bay windows and the blocking of the central carriage arch. In the 19th century new buildings were constructed to the west, and a general modernisation followed in 1900. The 1851 directory of Kingston-upon-Hull and York records John Pearson as the landlord of the Cross Keys, and the 1885 directory for York lists Thomas Ellis at the Cross Keys Inn.

Pub sign in 2020

Roman remains were found in Dringhouses during the 18th and 19th centuries. These included five stone coffins, one uncovered in the yard of the Cross Keys Inn, and a small burial ground near the junction of St Helen's Road and Tadcaster Road.

In 1975 the site was included within the newly established Tadcaster Road conservation area, and on 24 June 1983, the Cross Keys was designated a Grade II listed building. The pub stands a short distance from No. 25, the Grade II*-listed former entrance lodge to the Goddards estate, on the opposite side of the road.

It was refurbished in 2013, and received additional improvements in 2023. As of May 2023, the freehold is owned by Greene King.

== Architecture ==
The building is of brick construction with a tiled roof. It has two storeys with attic rooms and three main sections across the front. The outer sections each have a two‑storey bay window with sash frames and a flat top. In the centre of the upper floor there is an old window opening with an arched head, now filled in, with a smaller sash window set into the infill. The attic has dormer windows with simple gabled tops and sash frames.

On the ground floor, the centre of the front once contained a wide arched carriage entrance, now closed off and fitted with narrow windows on either side of a later porch. The porch has a small gabled top supported on brackets and a framed doorway. To the left of the former carriage entrance there are signs of later alterations, including a surviving section of brick banding.

The side wall facing St Helen's Road also has two matching two‑storey bay windows. Above them the roof is half‑hipped, with a gabled feature over a wide dormer containing casement windows.

== See also ==
- Listed buildings in York (outside the city walls, southern part)
