= Lound Hall =

Country house in Nottinghamshire, England

Coordinates: 53.250°N 0.952°W

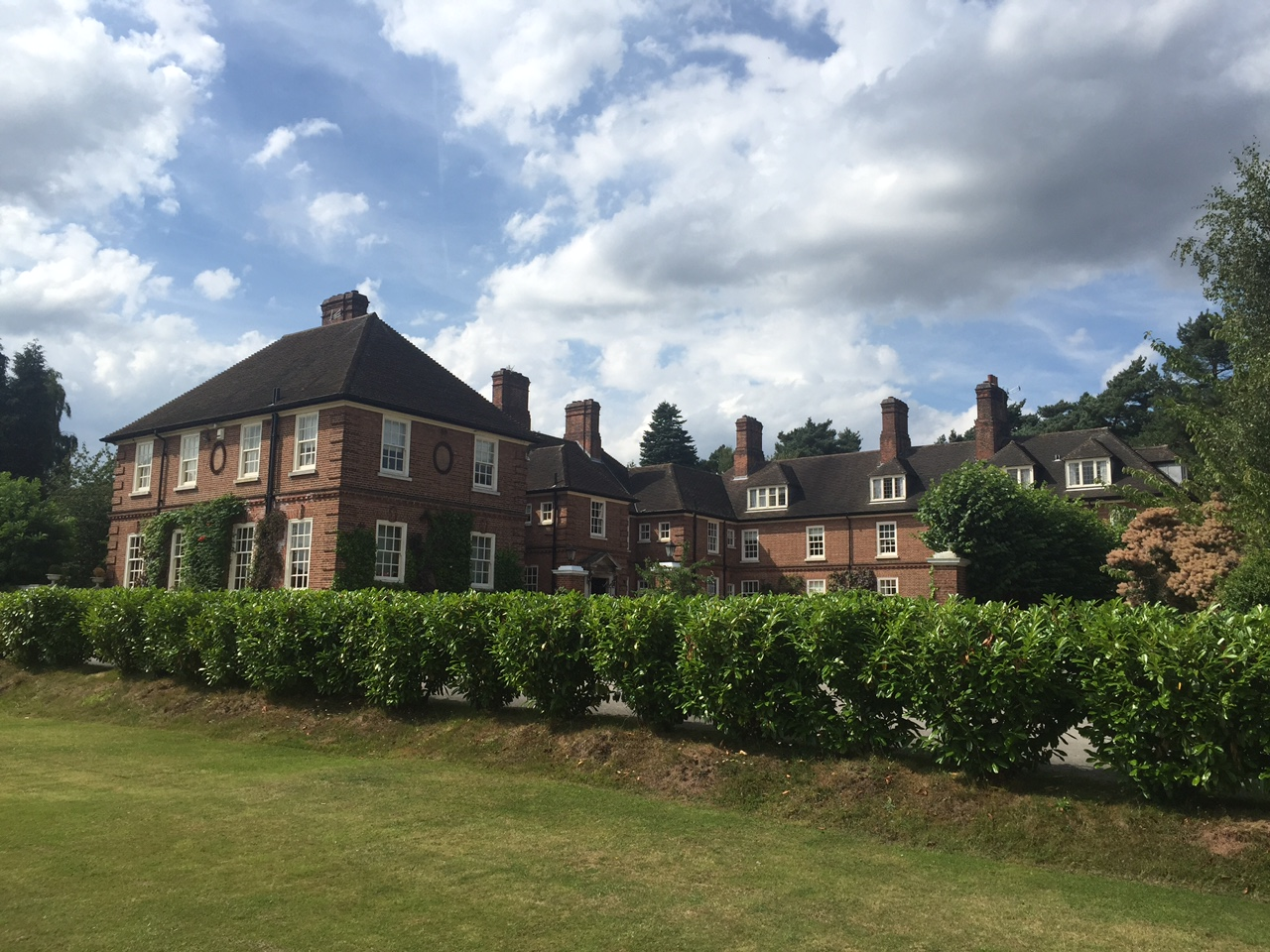
Lound Hall

Lound Hall is a country house which sits in between the villages of Bothamsall and Bevercotes, in the county of Nottinghamshire, England. The current house was built in the Georgian style in the 1930s for Sir Harald Peake, a mining company director. There has been a manor house on the site since the 1700s. The hall was used as an orthopaedic hospital during World War II, and later became a training centre for the National Coal Board as well as a mining museum. It has now reverted to private ownership.

== Description ==
Lound Hall is located on the eastern edge of the village of Bothamsall, close to the A1 dual carriageway and a few miles south of the town of Retford. It is situated next to the River Maun, and has extensive woodland to the north, stretching as far as the River Meden. It is built in the neo-Georgian style, and is a Grade II listed building, having received that designation on 14 November 1985. The house is private property, but can be seen from a public footpath which runs across the grounds.

The hall was built using hand-made red bricks, with a tiled hipped roof. Its interior features several panelled rooms, one of which is a library with a marble fireplace, and another has an Adam-style fireplace.

== History ==
=== Early history ===
Lound Hall is mentioned in a republished edition of Thoroton's History of Nottinghamshire: Volume 3 by Robert Thoroton, with additions by John Throsby, dating to 1796. The book says of the hall: "It is occupied by, what the world now fashionably denominates, a gentleman grazier. It appears to have nothing striking either with respect to magnitude or elegance.".

In 1832 the hall was situated in an exclave of the parish of Gamston despite being closer to other villages. The History, gazetteer, and directory of Nottinghamshire for that year reported a local rumour that this anomaly was due to a corpse having been found in the hall some years previously, which was refused for burial by the chapelry at Bothamsall and therefore had to be taken north to Gamston.

=== Building of the current Lound Hall ===
The present-day hall was built in 1937, with architecture by York-based Brierly, Rutherford and Syme (the latter two of which later went into partnership together as Rutherford and Syme). Its first owners were the family of Harald Peake, a mining director with businesses in Yorkshire and Nottinghamshire, who had been a varsity rower at Cambridge and went on to become squadron leader of the No. 609 Squadron RAF in World War II.

=== Wartime ===
The Hall was requisitioned during World War II for use as a base for the Royal Air Force, and then later became a military hospital for injured servicemen, being attached to the Harlow Wood Orthopaedic Hospital in Mansfield. It reverted to its owners shortly before the end of the war.

=== Training centre and coal mining museum ===
In the post-war years, the hall became a regional training centre for the National Coal Board. In 1971, two members of the National Coal Board, R. W. Storer and Alan Griffin, set up a mining museum on the site. The museum featured the headstocks from the Brinsley Colliery in the west of Nottinghamshire, which had closed in 1970.

The museum closed in 1989. Most of the museum's collection was relocated to the Chatterley Whitfield mining museum in Staffordshire and, when that too closed, it was transferred to the National Coal Mining Museum in Yorkshire. The headstocks from Brinsley were taken back to the original site of the colliery, which by then had become a country park.

=== Present day ===
The house and gardens are not currently open to the public but the exterior and stable courtyard can be seen from footpaths that pass through the grounds and main drive.

== See also ==
- Listed buildings in Bothamsall
- North Notts College
