= Architectural firm =

Company employing licensed architects, offering architecture-related services

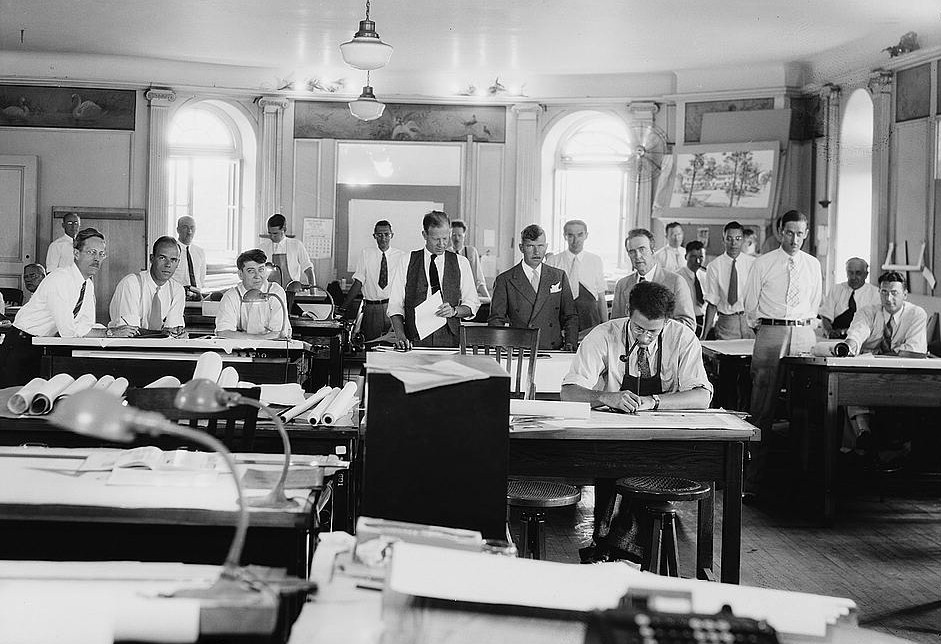
A 1940s architectural office.

In the United States, an architectural firm or architecture firm is a business that employs one or more licensed architects and practices the profession of architecture; while in South Africa, the United Kingdom, Ireland, Denmark and other countries, an architectural firm is a company or partnership that offers architectural services.

Architects (or master builders) have existed since early in recorded history. The earliest recorded architects include Imhotep (c. 2600 BCE) and Senemut (c. 1470 BCE). No writings exist to describe how these architects performed their work. However, members of the nobility had staffs of assistants and retainers to help refine and implement their work. The oldest surviving book on architecture, De architectura by the Roman architect Vitruvius describes the design and construction of towns, buildings, clocks, and machines, but provides no information about the organisation of the architect's assistants. It is generally accepted that throughout most of human history, most architects were wealthy individuals who derived their primary income from activities other than design and who practiced design as a part-time pursuit, employing assistants on a project-by-project basis.

It was only in the 19th century that architecture began to be practiced as a full-time profession, when specific training and accreditation began to be offered. In the United States, Charles Bulfinch is the first American believed to have worked as a full-time professional architect. Henry Hobson Richardson may have been one of the first to have an established office and McKim, Mead, and White may have been among the first to resemble the large, modern architectural firm. The oldest active architecture firms in the United States are SmithGroup of Detroit, MI and Luckett and Farley of Louisville, KY, having both been founded in 1853. In the United Kingdom, Brierley Groom is the oldest continuing practice, having been founded in 1750 at York, England. They may be the oldest active architectural practice in the world. Architects (or master builders) have existed since early in recorded history. The earliest recorded architects include Imhotep (c. 2600 BCE) and Senemut (c. 1470 BCE). No writings exist to describe how these architects performed their work. However, members of the nobility had staffs of assistants and retainers to help refine and implement their work. The oldest surviving book on architecture, De architectura by the Roman architect Vitruvius describes the design and construction of towns, buildings, clocks, and machines, but provides no information about the organisation of the architect's assistants. It is generally accepted that throughout most of human history, most architects were wealthy individuals who derived their primary income from activities other than design and who practiced design as a part-time pursuit, employing assistants on a project-by-project basis.

It was only in the 19th century that architecture began to be practiced as a full-time profession, when specific training and accreditation began to be offered. In the United States, Charles Bulfinch is the first American believed to have worked as a full-time professional architect. Henry Hobson Richardson may have been one of the first to have an established office and McKim, Mead, and White may have been among the first to resemble the large, modern architectural firm. The oldest active architecture firms in the United States are SmithGroup of Detroit, MI and Luckett and Farley of Louisville, KY, having both been founded in 1853. In the United Kingdom, Brierley Groom is the oldest continuing practice, having been founded in 1750 at York, England. They may be the oldest active architectural practice in the world.

== Licensure and legal form ==
Architects may be licensed by individual states or provinces, as they are in Australia, Canada and the United States. Licensure is usually achieved by a combination of formal education, internship, and examinations. Although architects are licensed individually, state laws allow them to join together in various forms of business organisation.

All states in the United States allow architects to form partnerships, most allow architects to form corporations or professional corporations, and some allow limited liability partnerships (LLPs) or limited liability companies (LLCs). Some states require the firm to obtain a registration to provide architectural services. Others merely require that the architectural work of the firm be performed under the direct supervision of an architect licensed in the state. A few US states allow corporations to provide architectural services provided that a licensed employee of the firm serves as architect of record for any project.

In the United Kingdom and other countries, an architecture firm must have a business registration. The firm needs at least one registered professional within the team to offer a full architectural service. A professional indemnity insurance is also compulsory.

== Principals ==
An architecture firm in the United States usually has at least one "principal," a licensed architect who is the sole proprietor of the firm, or one who shares an ownership interest with the other architects in the firm (either as a partner in a partnership, or as a shareholder in a corporation). Sometimes the title of principal is limited to owners who hold a certain percentage of ownership interest in a firm, or it may be expanded to include anyone with a leadership role in a firm. Some firms may also use the title "principal-in-charge," which denotes an architect who oversees the firm's services in connection with a specific project.

In the United Kingdom and other countries, the principal of an architecture firm is responsible for the practice. It is generally a qualified architect, architectural technologist, engineer or an architectural designer.

== Organization ==
Small firms with fewer than five people usually have no formal organizational structure, depending on the personal relationships of the principals and employees to organize the work. Medium-sized firms with 5 to 50 employees are often organized departmentally in departments such as design, production, business development, and construction administration. Large firms of over 50 people may be organized departmentally, regionally, or in studios specializing in project types. Other permutations also exist.

Advances in information technology have made it possible for firms to open offices or establish alliances with other firms in different parts of the world. This makes it possible for some portions of the work to be performed in the US or UK, and other portions in locations such as India or Mexico, for example. In addition to using lower-cost, high-skill professionals in Asian countries, it also enables some firms to work, in effect, two or three shifts due to time differences. Increasingly developers in India and China are hiring US and European firms to work on local developments. This is often coordinated or sub-contracted by architecture firms in these countries—in effect outsourcing work to the US and European firms. The recent market situation has led to an acceleration in this trend and a growing number of architecture firms in India and China are now outsourcing work to architects in the west.

The long-term and widespread effects of these practices on architectural firms (in all parts of the world) remain to be seen.

== See also ==
- List of architecture firms
- List of architects
