= 25 Tadcaster Road =

Listed building in York, England

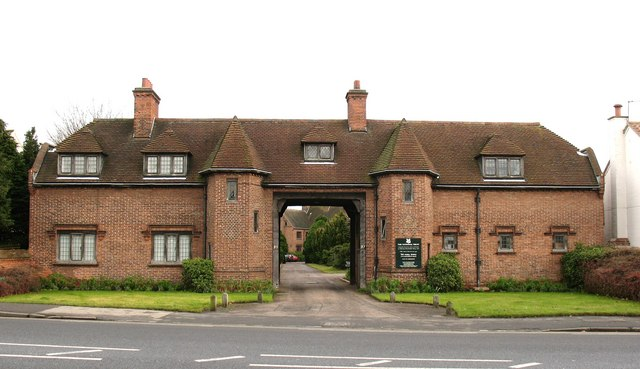
- The building in 2008
- Interactive map of the 25 Tadcaster Road area

General information
- Status: Private residence
- Type: Lodge (former)
- Architectural style: Arts and Crafts
- Location: Dringhouses, York, England
- Coordinates: 53.9407°N 1.1057°W
- Year built: 1927; 99 years ago
- Client: Noel Terry

Design and construction
- Architect: Walter Brierley

Listed Building – Grade II*
- Official name: Number 25 including carriage entrance
- Designated: 14 June 1954
- Reference no.: 1259189

25 Tadcaster Road is a Grade II* listed building in Dringhouses, a suburb of York, England. Built in 1927 as an entrance lodge for Noel Terry, owner of the chocolate firm Terry's of York, it was designed by the local architect Walter Brierley and formed part of the Goddards estate, whose main house served as the Terry family home. The lodge, originally occupied by the family's chauffeur, was the final major project of Brierley's career. It was included in the Tadcaster Road conservation area in 1975. After the National Trust took over Goddards House and Garden in 1984 as its regional office, the lodge appears to have been used for non‑residential purposes before returning to private residential use in 1999.

== History ==
The property was built in 1927 as an entrance lodge for Noel Terry, owner of the chocolate firm Terry's of York. It was designed by the local architect Walter Brierley and formed part of the Goddards estate, whose main house served as the Terry family home and was also designed by Brierley. The project was the final major work of his career, completed shortly after his death. The lodge was originally occupied by the family's chauffeur.

In 1975 the site was included within the newly established Tadcaster Road conservation area, and on 24 June 1983, No. 25 was designated a Grade II* listed building. In 1984 the National Trust took over Goddards House and Garden as its regional office, and the lodge appears to have been used for non‑residential purposes during this period. It returned to private residential use in 1999.

== Architecture ==
Rear of the building, seen from the driveway to Goddards

The building is made of narrow red brick, mostly laid in simple horizontal courses, with some patterned bricks. It has oak‑framed windows with leaded glass and a plain tile roof. The front is almost symmetrical, though the arrangement of windows varies slightly.

It has one storey with attic rooms. At the centre is a carriage entrance supported by oak posts and a lintel. On each side are three‑sided brick staircase turrets, each with small staggered windows on every level. To the left are two three‑light windows with projecting mouldings above them, and two hipped attic dormers of the same size. Above the carriage entrance is a smaller two‑light dormer, and further right a larger three‑light one. On the right side of the ground floor are three single‑light windows with mouldings above. There are chimney stacks along the ridge, one to the right of the carriageway and another to the left between the dormers. The end walls have half‑hipped roofs with small gabled features at the top.

== See also ==
- Grade II* listed buildings in the City of York
- Listed buildings in York (outside the city walls, southern part)
