= Dringhouses =

Suburb of York in North Yorkshire, England

Coordinates: 53.940160°N 1.116880°W

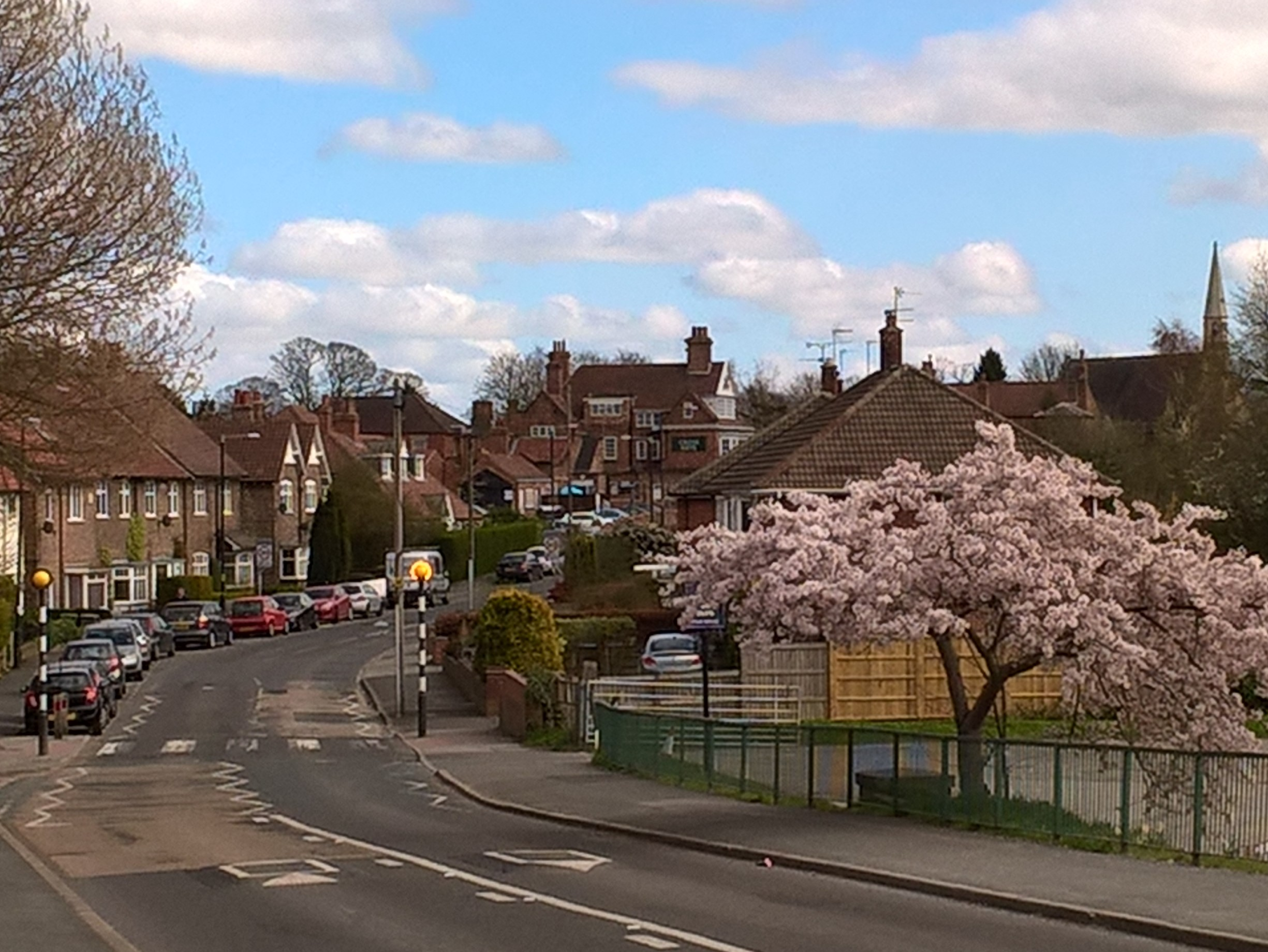
- St Helens Road, Dringhouses, March 2019

- Location within North Yorkshire
- Population: 11,084 (2011 census)
- OS grid reference: SE580496
  - London: 170 mi (270 km) SSE
- Unitary authority: City of York
- Ceremonial county: North Yorkshire
- Region: Yorkshire and the Humber
- Country: England
- Sovereign state: United Kingdom
- Post town: YORK
- Postcode district: YO24
- Police: North Yorkshire
- Fire: North Yorkshire
- Ambulance: Yorkshire
- UK Parliament: York Outer

Dringhouses is a suburb of York, in the ceremonial county of North Yorkshire, England. Historically part of the West Riding of Yorkshire, it is bounded by the Knavesmire, an open area of land on which York Racecourse is situated, to the east, Askham Bog and the A64 to the south, Woodthorpe and Foxwood to the west, and Acomb and Holgate to the north. It is part of the City of York ward is called Dringhouses and Woodthorpe which covers an area of 4.3 km^{2} (1.7 sq mi) and had a population of 11,084 at the 2011 Census. It is located approximately two and quarter miles from York city centre.

The name derives from "Drengeshirses" (1109) and means "the houses of the drengs", a "dreng" being a man who held land by a particular kind of free tenure.

It is a mixture of housing estates and large open spaces, with the East Coast main railway line running through the middle.

== History ==
The Fox and Roman pub takes its name from a Roman burial excavated here in 1997

The Cross Keys was built in the early 18th century, but there has been an inn on this site since c. 1250

Five Neolithic stone axes provide the earliest evidence for human activity in the area of Dringhouses which is located on a ridge of glacial moraine running southwest from York that may have been used during the Bronze Age as a well-defined trade route. A Roman road linking Eboracum (York) with Calcaria (Tadcaster) was constructed on this route along which civilian settlements developed as shown by archaeological evidence including a Roman cemetery and timber-framed buildings from the 1st to 2nd-century.

The Old Norse name from which Dringhouses is derived, indicates the villagers were the descendants of Halfdan, the Viking leader who had taken the area from the Angles and had shared the land among his warriors in 876. The free land of the Drengs became a Norman manor - ultimately owned by Archbishop Walter de Gray who granted it to his brother Robert in 1244 and thence to John, Lord Grey of Rotherfield. The title passed to Sir John Deincourt and his ancestors until it was inherited by the Wilkinson family. The last Lord of the manor, Col. Wilkinson, died on 13 January 1941. The subsequent break-up of the estate meant that most of the land in the village was no longer owned by one family.

There was a long dispute over the Wapentake of the Ainsty - which included Dringhouses - from the early Middle Ages. In 1276 the Courts of Edward I dealt with a claim by the York Corporation that:-"... the citizens of York hold the wapentake of Ainsty and the city of York of the King...". The claim was based on a Charter of the reign of King John and the case was lost on the grounds that the extent of the land was not specified and, more seriously, that the Charter contained erasures. For this the Mayor was held responsible and was imprisoned for a short time. The claim was revived in 1448 and upheld. From that date until 1832 the people of the Ainsty and therefore Dringhouses were under the authority of York Corporation.

Though Dringhouses was within the parish of Holy Trinity Priory, Micklegate, it formed a separate manor and thus lay outside of the City of York. In St Helen's Road, between 1920 and 1946, the house next to the Cross Keys car park was the Club House for the 15-hole golf course on the Hob Moor, which later moved, as the York Golf Club, to Strensall, with the railway workers who used to play there moving to Pike Hills Golf Club.

The present shops on Tadcaster Road were originally a row of cottages known as Meek's Buildings, nicknamed "Washing Tub Row" because those who lived there took in washing for the gentry.

Dringhouses village was incorporated into the City in 1937. The present Marriott Hotel (formerly the Chase Hotel) stands at the boundary of the village with the city and was the terminus for the trams in their heyday. The electric trams replaced the horse-drawn omnibuses in 1911.

Goddards House and Garden in Dringhouses is a former home of the Terry family, famed chocolate makers. The Grade I-listed building was built in 1927 and is a visitor attraction and regional office of the National Trust. The estate's entrance lodge, now listed at Grade II*, is at 25 Tadcaster Road.

Hob Moor, which forms part of the Knavesmire and hence Micklegate Stray, is first mentioned in documents in 1374 as '"Yhorkesmore""' and first noted as '"Hobbe Moore"' in 1624 by the cartographer, Samuel Parsons. During the early 17th century, accommodation was constructed to house plague victims on Hob Lane, leading to the Moor. This is indicated by the Plague Stone still visible today. Next to this stone is the '"Hob Stone"' which depicts the shield and effigy of a knight of the de Ros family, who is reputed to have given his name to the area. In 1745, the York to Tadcaster Turnpike was constructed, which follows the route of the modern Tadcaster Road in the area. The Moor has been used as an area for the Military. In 1644, the Scottish troops, who were part of the Parliamentarian Army, were encamped here during the siege of York. From 1912 to 1920, the Moor was used for training Cavalry troops.

On the eastbound carriageway of Tadcaster Road in Dringhouses is a small brick enclosure that was once used as a pinfold. It is located opposite Royal Chase.

== Governance ==
Dringhouses is part of the Dringhouses and Woodthorpe Ward in the Unitary Authority of York. As of the 2019 local elections it is represented by Liberal Democrat Councillors Stephen Fenton, Ashley Mason and Paula Widdowson.

It forms part of the UK Parliamentary Constituency of York Outer and EU Constituency of Yorkshire and the Humber.

Dringhouses was formerly a township and chapelry in the parishes of St Mary Bishophill Senior, Holy Trinity-Micklegate and Acomb, in 1866 Dringhouses became a separate civil parish, in 1894 the parish was abolished and split, the part in the County Borough of York became Dringhouses Within and the rural part became Dringhouses Without. In 1891 the parish had a population of 647.

== Demography ==
The 2011 census recorded that the population of the ward was 11,084 of which 91.1% were born in England and 4.9% from outside the United Kingdom. The mean age was 43.1 years with 44.4% aged between 30 and 59. Of the total population 94.8% described their ethnic origin as White-British. The 2011 figures show that 64.9% declared they were Christian, whilst 26.3% declared they had no religion, whereas this had been 79.2% Christian and 14.0% no religion in 2001. Of the population in 2011 aged between 16 and 74 years old, 72.6% declared they were economically active and 18.3% said they were retired. Between 2001 and 2011 the number of households increased from 4,650 to 4986, of which 50.1% were semi-detached and 29.6% were detached. The level of household ownership was 80.4%.

== Economy ==
In past years, most employment was in agriculture. In 1823, Baines' Directory recorded several farmers and gardeners, a herdsman and a butcher. Also listed are the Fox Inn (later renamed the Fox and Roman) and the Cross Keys Inn. The 2011 census recorded the main areas of employment to be in the retail (15.7%), education (13.2%) and health and social work (11.8%) sectors. At the south end of Dringhouses is a large Tesco supermarket and York College. Employment can be found in the health care centre as St Leonard's Hospice is next to York College. Some employment can be found in the leisure sector, as two major chain hotels are located at the north end of Dringhouses on Tadcaster Road. The racing stables on Hunters Way also provide employment.

== Geography ==
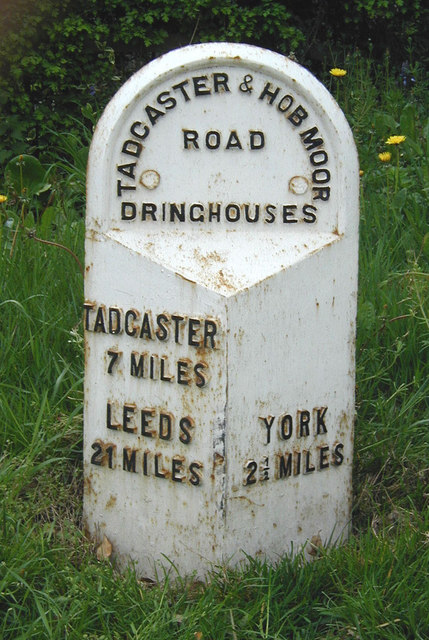
Dringhouses milepost

Dringhouses is located just over 2 miles (3.2 km) south of York city centre: there are two Grade II-listed milestones along Tadcaster Road that give the distances from York of 1 1/2 miles, just north of Dringhouses, (between Nelson's Lane and Chalfonts) and 2 1/2 miles, at the south end (opposite the Tesco store). The East Coast Main Line runs through the centre of the area. There are some open areas of land including Marsh farm, Chaloners Whin and Sim Hills. Council run allotments can be found at the entrance to Hob Moor on Tadcaster Road. There are areas of open water near Aintree Court, Bramble Dene and at Chapmans Pond and Hogg's Pond on Moor Lane. There are several small becks or streams in the area, namely on Hob Moor and on Chaloners Whin.

The largest open area is Hob Moor which is part of the Knavesmire, that together make up Micklegate Stray. This land was once used for growing crops as demonstrated by the ridges and furrows still evident. As of 2010, it is still used as grazing land, licensed by York City Council. Hob Moor was designated as a Local Nature Reserve in 2003 and hosts a variety of flora and fauna. Amongst the birds that can be found here are meadow pipit, Eurasian skylark, whinchat, northern wheatear, yellow wagtail and merlin.

Play areas can be found at Nelson's Lane, Heron Avenue (owned by the Joseph Rowntree Foundation), Woodthorpe Green and Leeside.

The York to Tadcaster turnpike ran through this area following the route of the modern Tadcaster Road, which formed part of the old A64 to Leeds.

== Facilities ==
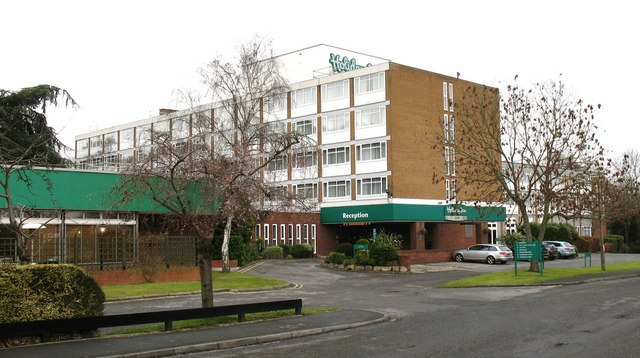
Holiday Inn, York

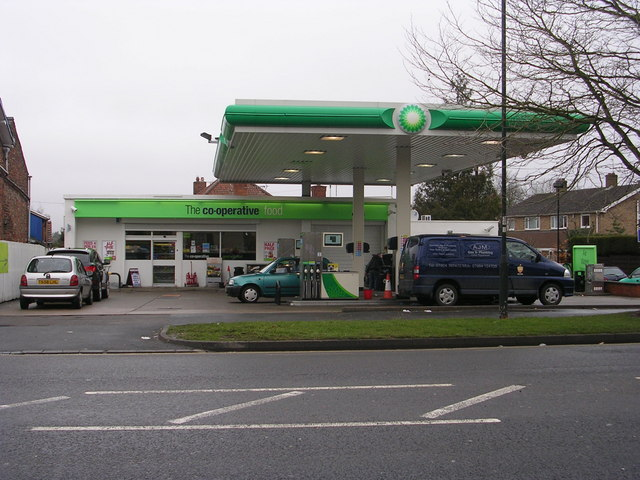
Fuel station

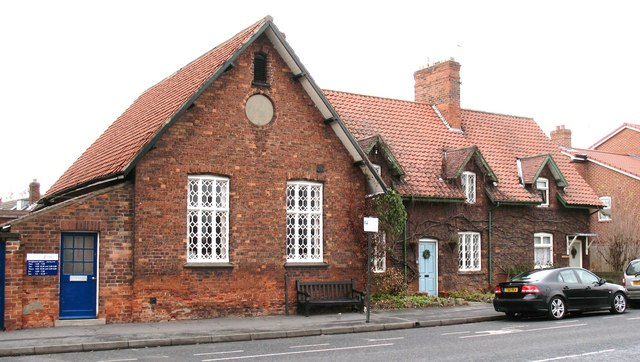
The library

== Transport ==
The area is well served by local public transport. First York operate several local bus services passing through Dringhouses the most frequent being the Acomb–City Centre and Foxwood–City–Monks Cross routes. They also operate a Park and Ride service from Askham Bar. Connexionsbuses operate a Copmanthorpe–City–Haxby service and York Pullman operate along Tadcaster Road as part of their service between Tadcaster and York. Transdev operate Cityzap services between Leeds and York, and several Coastliner routes between Leeds and the Yorkshire coast.

== Education ==
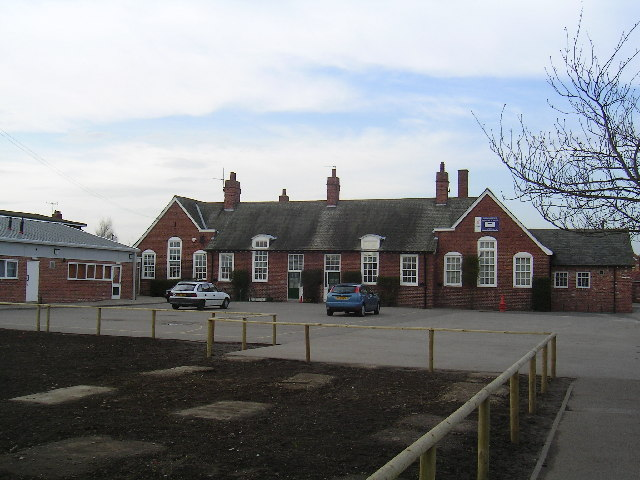
Dringhouses Primary School

Primary education is catered for at Dringhouses Primary School on St Helens Road. The original school was founded in 1849 - adjacent to the church. In 1852 a new school was built and is now the local library. It then moved into the old school house on its present site next to the railway in 1904, designed by architect Walter Brierley.

After the school moved the 1852 building was used as a reading room until 1942. Part of the Grade II-listed building then became the Wilkinson Memorial Library, usually referred to as Dringhouses Library, when the building was given for the benefit of the local citizens following the death of Colonel Wilkinson in 1941. A plaque to commemorate this was unveiled in March 2016.

York College has its campus at the former Tollcross at the south-western edge of Dringhouses and caters for Sixth Form and Further Education in York. The college was built on the area previously occupied by Ashfield Secondary School, the nearby old York College of Arts & Technology being demolished for a new housing estate.

== Religion ==
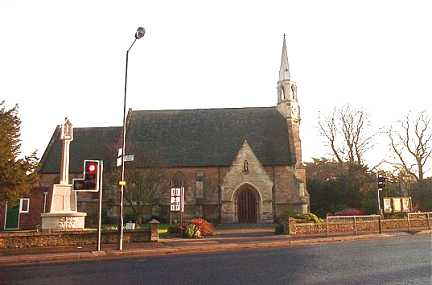
The Church of St Edward the Confessor, Dringhouses

St Edward the Confessor's Church, Dringhouses is located on Tadcaster Road, opposite the junction with St Helen's Road, St Helen being the patron of previous chapels on the same site.

Chantry certificates of 1546 and 1548 record the existence of a chapel of ease dedicated to St Helen in Dringhouses. This was replaced by a new chapel in 1725, of which some floor tiles remain in situ beside the present church. At the time it was within the parish of Holy Trinity, Micklegate, and was the only church within a city parish in York to have been rebuilt during the 18th century. The Church of St Edward was built in 1847–49 and received its own parish in 1853. It is a Grade II listed building and was designed by Vickers and Hugall of Pontefract. It was constructed of limestone with green slate roof-tiles, however the spire was replaced with a fibreglass replica in 1970. The church contains some woodwork carvings by Mousey Thompson.

Parish records dating from 1824 are held at the Borthwick Institute in York.

In the churchyard is a Grade II listed war memorial designed by Brierley and Rutherford in 1922, which lists the names of those who died in the World Wars.

A Methodist chapel was built in Dringhouses in 1834 at the corner of Slingsby Grove and Tadcaster Road; Methodism having been introduced to the area in 1816. This was replaced in 1890 with a larger building, known as "Dringhouses Chapel", on the same site. This closed when the chapel was relocated to a new building in West Thorpe, which opened on 17 July 1954.

== Scouting ==
Dringhouses Scout Group is one of the largest in York and North Yorkshire and is home to over 220 young people between the ages of 6 and 17 years old. The Beaver Scouts (6–8yrs) meet in three groups called colonies, these are named 1st, 2nd and 3rd. The Cub Scouts (8–10½yrs) meet in three groups called packs and these are named Romans, Saxons and Vikings. There are three Scout Troops (10½–14yrs). These are named Parish Church Troop, St Edward's Troop and St Helen's Troop. Yorvik Explorer Scout Unit (14–17yrs) also meet at Dringhouses, providing activities for the oldest youth members.

== Sport ==
Dringhouses Sports and Social Club on St Helens Road next to the railway lines, provide football and cricket teams to local leagues. It is also the meeting place for the York Knavesmire Harriers Athletic Club. As of the 2024–25 season Dringhouses AFC play in the York Football League Premier Division and Dringhouses Reserves are in Reserve Division A. As of the 2024 season Dringhouses Cricket Club 1st XI play in Division One West of the Yorkshire Premier League North and the 2nd XI play in Division Galtres 3. In 2024, the chair of the cricket club and former 1st XI captain, Michael Kenyon, represented England at the over 70s World Cup.

== Notable residents ==
Lt Col Charles Philip Heath lived in Dringhouses in the 1920s. In the First World War he commanded the 135th Siege Battery of the Royal Garrison Artillery and was awarded the DSO and Italian Silver Medal. In the Second World War he became a prisoner of war (1942–1945) after the Fall of Singapore.

== See also ==
- Dringhouses Yard
