= Listed buildings in Bothamsall =

Bothamsall is a civil parish in the Bassetlaw District of Nottinghamshire, England. The parish contains nine listed buildings that are recorded in the National Heritage List for England. All the listed buildings are designated at Grade II, the lowest of the three grades, which is applied to "buildings of national importance and special interest". The parish contains the village of Bothamsall and the surrounding countryside. The listed buildings consist of a country house, smaller houses and cottages, farmhouses, a church and a bridge.

== Buildings ==
Name and location	Photograph	Date	Notes
Haughton Park House and walls 53.25781°N 0.97720°W		c. 1700	A red brick house on a plinth, with a floor band, a wooden cornice, and a Mansard pantile roof. There are two storeys and attics, and four bays, and a single-storey single-bay extension recessed on the right. The doorway has a traceried fanlight in a moulded surround with a keystone. The windows are sashes, in the extension is a bow window, and in the roof is a dormer with a tripartite casement. On the centre of the roof is a wood and lead cupola that has arcades with keystones, a dentilled cornice, and a pointed shaped roof. The garden is enclosed by a coped brick wall that contains doorways with segmental arches.
Church Farmhouse; 53.25362°N 0.98945°W		Mid 18th century	The farmhouse is in painted brick with an eaves band and a pantile roof. There is a single storey and attics, four bays, the outer bays gabled, and to the right is a recessed lower single-bay wing. The windows are tripartite casements, all but one with segmental heads.
Road bridge 53.25014°N 0.99231°W		c. 1800	The bridge carries Meadow Lane over the River Meden. It is in red brick with stone dressings, and consists of two round arches, with a sill band, stone cutwaters, and stone coped parapets. The parapets slope down to end piers with shaped caps.
Haughton Kennels Farm; 53.26236°N 0.98017°W	—	Early 19th century	The farmhouse is stuccoed, on a plinth, with sprocket eaves and a hipped slate roof. There are two storeys and three bays, the outer bays projecting, and lower two-storey rear wings. On the centre is a lean-to with decorative iron work and a felt roof, flanked by recessed arched panels containing fixed lights, with segmental heads and balustrades below and a continuous hood mould above. The upper floor contains casement windows with segmental heads, and recessed on the right is a glass, stucco and felt porch.
Post Office Farmhouse; 53.25343°N 0.98986°W		Early 19th century	The farmhouse is in red brick with dogtooth eaves, and a pantile roof with brick coped gables and kneelers. There are two storeys and attics, three bays, and lower two-storey rear wings. On the front are a doorway and casement windows, all with segmental arches.
Bothamsall Hall; 53.25367°N 0.98733°W		1844–45	A vicarage, later a private house, it is partly in stone, partly in rendered brick and has tile roofs with coped gables, some with kneelers. There are two storeys, a main front of ten irregular bays, and an entrance front of eleven bays with a gabled porch. Some of the windows are sashes, and most are casements, some with mullions, and some are cross casements, and there are canted bay windows.
Church of Our Lady and St. Peter; 53.25334°N 0.98928°W		1844–45	The church is built in stone with tile roofs, and consists of a nave, a north aisle, a chancel, a vestry, and a west tower with a northeast stair turret. The tower has three stages, angle buttresses, bands, and clock faces. On the south side is a round-arched doorway with a moulded surround and a hood mould, in the north front is a lean-to containing a similar doorway, and in the west front is an arched window with a hood mould. The top stage contains four-light bell openings, eight gargoyles, and an embattled parapet with four crocketed pinnacles. The stair turret has three stages, gargoyles, and an embattled parapet, and embattled parapets with pinnacles run along the sides of the body of the church. There are finials at the east ends of the nave and the chancel.
37, 38 and 39 Main Street and smithy 53.25194°N 0.99302°W		Late 19th century	A row of three cottages and a smithy in red brick on a plinth, with stone dressings, a tile roof with stone coped gables, kneelers and moulded ridge finials. There is a single storey and attics, seven bays, the outer bays projecting and gabled, and a recessed single bay on the right. In the ground floor are tripartite casement windows and doorways, and in the left bay is an arched double doorway. Above are pairs of arched casements, the three in the centre in gabled half-dormers, and in the apex of the outer gables is a trefoil with a motif.
Lound Hall; 53.25072°N 0.95219°W		1937	A country house arranged three sides of a courtyard, in Georgian style. It is in red brick on a plinth, with quoins, a dentilled floor band, a moulded cornice, and hipped tile roofs. The west front has two storeys and attics, and eleven bays. On the front is a doorway, sash windows with cambered arches, wedge lintels and keystones, and oval panels with decorative surrounds, and in the attic is a dormer with a tripartite casement. The east front has ten bays and a central doorway with an open pediment.
