= Brierley Groom =

British architecture firm

Brierley Groom is an architecture practice in York, England, founded in 1750 by architect John Carr, making it the longest running practice in the United Kingdom, and one of the oldest in the world. It was once run by Walter Brierley, known for having created over 300 buildings in the York area and across the north of England. The company has won several design awards. The practice operates from an office in York and is currently owned by brothers, partners and chartered architects Greg and Matthew Groom.

== Principals ==
- John Carr (1723–1807)
- Peter Atkinson (1735–1805)
- Peter Atkinson II (1776–1838)
- John Bownas Atkinson (1807–1874)
- William Atkinson (1810–1887)
- James Demaine (1842–1911)
- Walter Henry Brierley (1862–1926)
- James Harvey Rutherford (1874–1946)
- John Stuart Syme (1872–1958)
- Cecil Leckenby (1891–1977)
- John K Keighley (1924–2003)
- David A Leckenby (1925–2012)
- Keith Groom (1939–1999)
- Gregory C Groom (1965-)
- Matthew R Groom (1971-)

== Notable buildings ==
- 1771 - Harewood House
- 1896 - Church of St Mary, Goathland
- 1906 - County Hall, Northallerton
- 1911 - Sledmere House - renovation by Walter Brierley after being gutted by fire
- 1927 - Goddards House and Garden
- 1991 - Scalby Mills ticket office - northern terminus of Scarborough Bay Railway
- 2016 - Scarborough lifeboat station
- 2017 - Bridlington lifeboat station
