= Bevercotes =

Coordinates: 53.245°N 0.953°W

- Hamlet and Civil parish
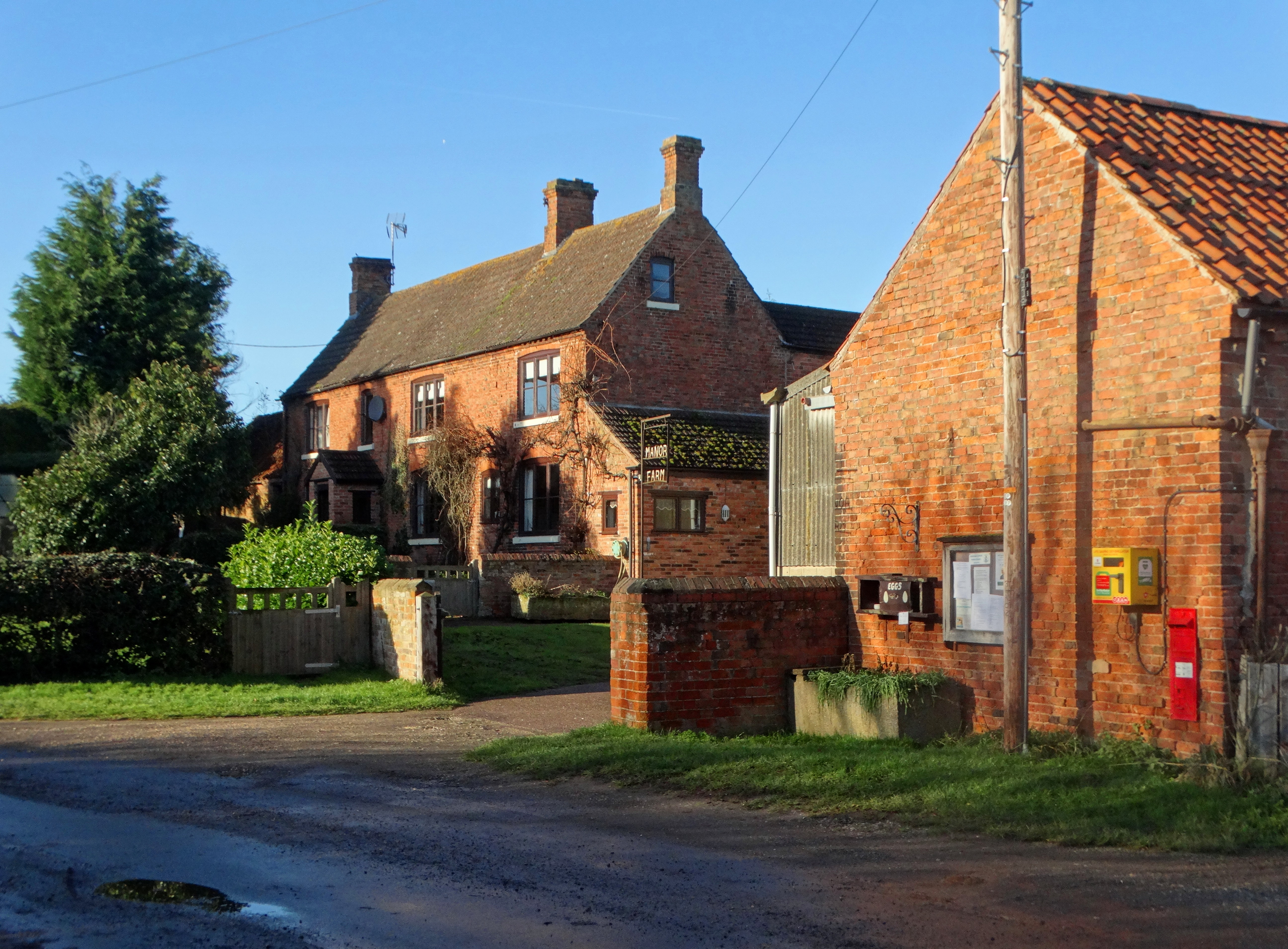
- Manor Farm

- Location within Nottinghamshire
- Interactive map of Bevercotes
- Area: 1.14 sq mi (3.0 km^{2})
- Population: 19
  - Density: 17/sq mi (6.6/km^{2})
- OS grid reference: SK5548
  - London: 125 mi (201 km) SE
- District: Bassetlaw
- Shire county: Nottinghamshire
- Region: East Midlands
- Country: England
- Sovereign state: United Kingdom
- Post town: Newark
- Postcode district: NG22
- Dialling code: 01623
- Police: Nottinghamshire
- Fire: Nottinghamshire
- Ambulance: East Midlands
- UK Parliament: Newark

Bevercotes is a hamlet and civil parish in the Bassetlaw district of Nottinghamshire, England, about six miles south of East Retford and five miles north-east of Ollerton. According to the 2001 census it had a population of 28. The population remained less than 100 at the 2011 census and was included in the civil parish of Bothamsall. In 2021 it was reported as having 19 residents.

The former Bevercotes Colliery was one of the first fully automated coal mines in the country.

== See also ==
- Bevercotes Colliery branch railway
