= North Notts College =

Further education college in Worksop, England

Coordinates: 53.3139°N 1.1206°W

North Notts College (previously North Nottinghamshire College) is a further education college in Worksop in the county of Nottinghamshire in England. It has 1300 full-time and 8,000 part-time students and 500 employees.

== History ==
=== Construction ===
A £17,913 contract was given in November 1928 for the County Technical Institute Worksop. It was built in the grounds of Carlton House.

As Worksop County Technical College, £41,700 extensions were approved in 1953. By 1956 the extensions were to cost £92,835, and £102,760 by 1959.

=== Opening ===
It was opened on Thursday 23 October 1930 by the Secretary for Mines Labour MP Manny Shinwell. It became the County Technical College from August 1932

In 1963, the County Technical College Worksop became North Nottinghamshire College of Further Education.

== Principals ==
- The first principal, AE Fox, retired in August 1956
- The new principal from 1956 was ES Davies, the former principal of Clowne Technical College

== Visits ==
On 22 March 2006, the Duke of Gloucester opened the Food Technology Centre.

== See also ==
- Lound Hall, known as Lound Hall Mining Training Centre
