= Bevercotes Colliery =

Coal mine in Nottinghamshire, England

- Location in Nottinghamshire
- Location: Nottinghamshire, Nottinghamshire, England; 53°15′29″N 0°57′40″W
- Products: Coal
- Opened: 1965
- Closed: 1993
- Company: British Coal

Bevercotes Colliery was the first fully automated mine. It went into production in July 1965. Located in Bevercotes to the north of Ollerton, the colliery was, alongside Cotgrave Colliery, one of two new collieries opened in the county of Nottinghamshire in the 1960s. The colliery was closed in 1993 and turned into a nature reserve.

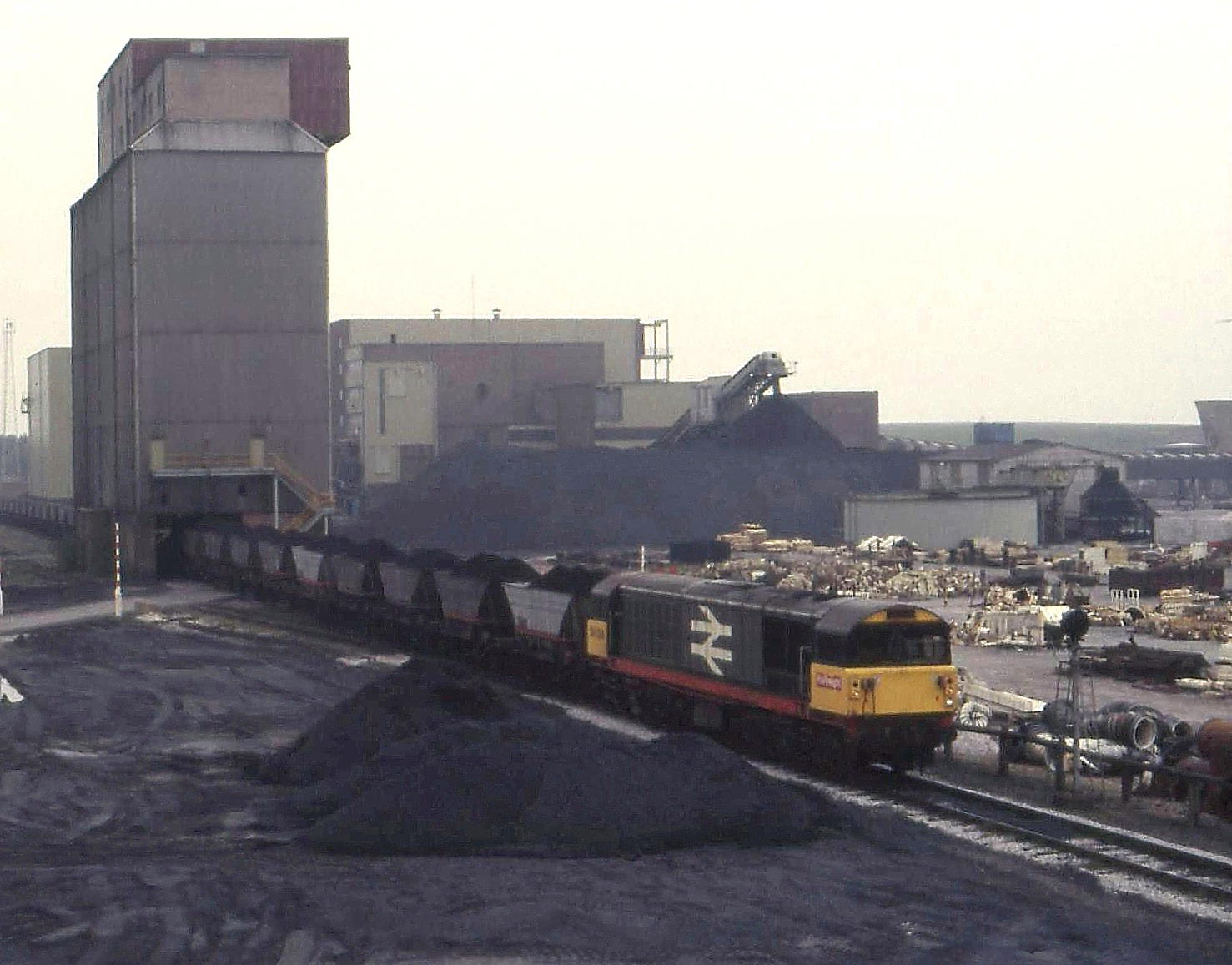
Bevercotes Colliery in 1988

The mine was served by a single track, 4.5 mi (7.2 km) branch railway opened in June 1960.

== Miners' strike 1984-5 ==
During the UK miners' strike (1984–85), Bevercotes Colliery voted approximately two-to-one against strike action in a ballot held on 15–16 March 1984. During the strike, Chris Butcher, a miner from Bevercotes Colliery, became well known as 'Silver Birch' who was funded by the Daily Mail to travel around the UK actively opposing the strike; he was also involved in organising legal action to block the National Union of Mineworkers (NUM), who were running the strike. In October 1985, Bevercotes miners voted to leave the NUM in favour of the Union of Democratic Mineworkers by 782 votes out of 1,372 cast (57%).
