= York Deanery =

Listed building in York, England

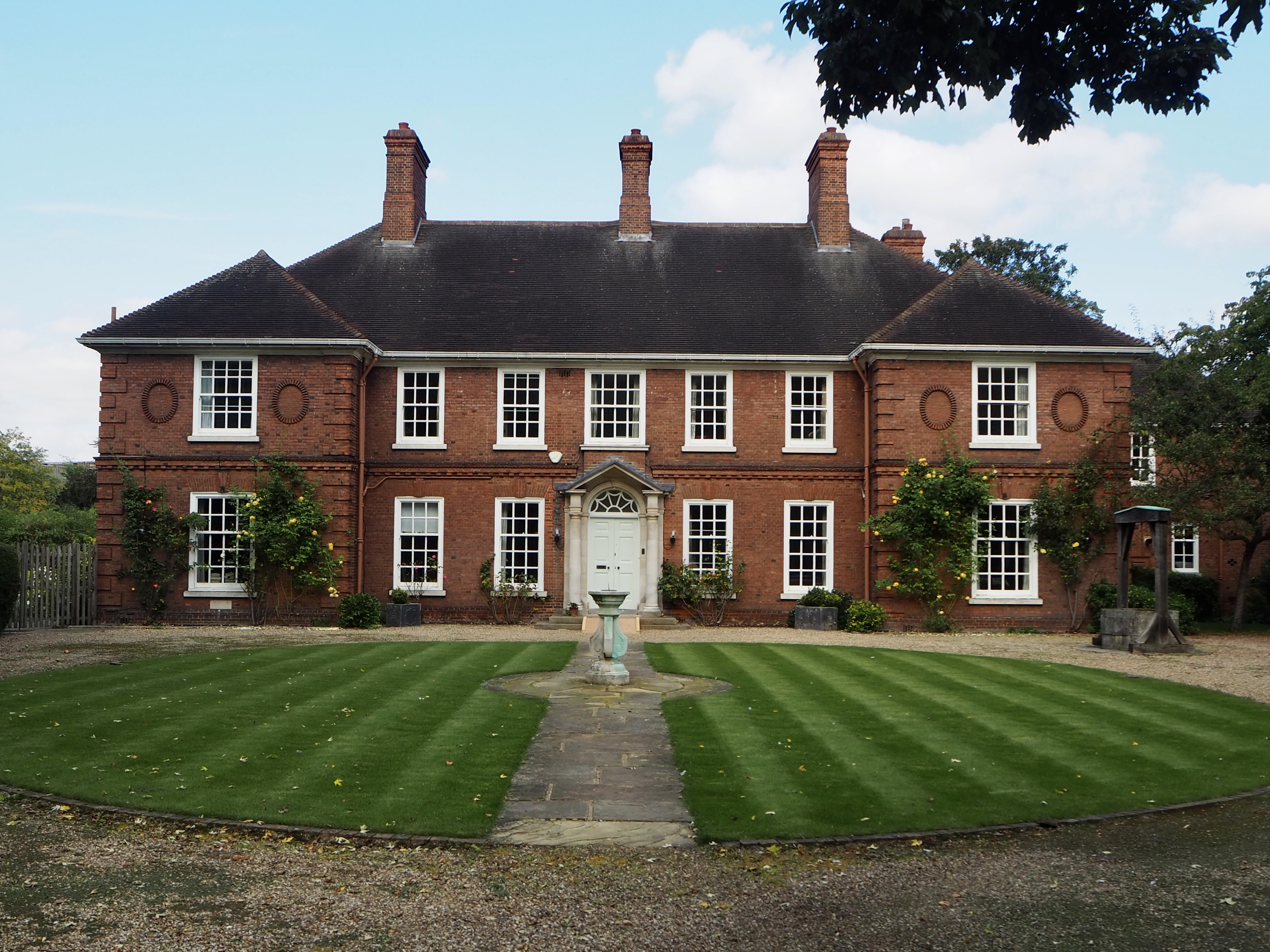
- The building in 2021
- Interactive map of the York Deanery area

General information
- Architectural style: Neo-Georgian
- Location: 1A Minster Yard, York, England
- Coordinates: 53°57′49″N 1°04′55″W
- Year built: 1939 (87 years ago)
- Client: Dean of York

Design and construction
- Architect: Rutherford and Syme
- Designations

Listed Building – Grade II
- Official name: The Deanery
- Designated: 14 March 1997
- Reference no.: 1257230

York Deanery is a historic building in York, England. It has been designated a Grade II listed building by Historic England. The property is located about 400 feet (120 m) north of York Minster, in Minster Yard, behind York Minster Library.

The building, designed in the neo-Georgian style by architects Rutherford and Syme (one of their final works), is constructed of red brick with ashlar dressings. It has a plain-tile hipped roof with four chimney stacks. It replaced an earlier residence of the dean of York.

The front gate of the property, which opens onto the cul-de-sac at the northern end of Minster Yard, is topped by the coats of arms of the Diocese of York.

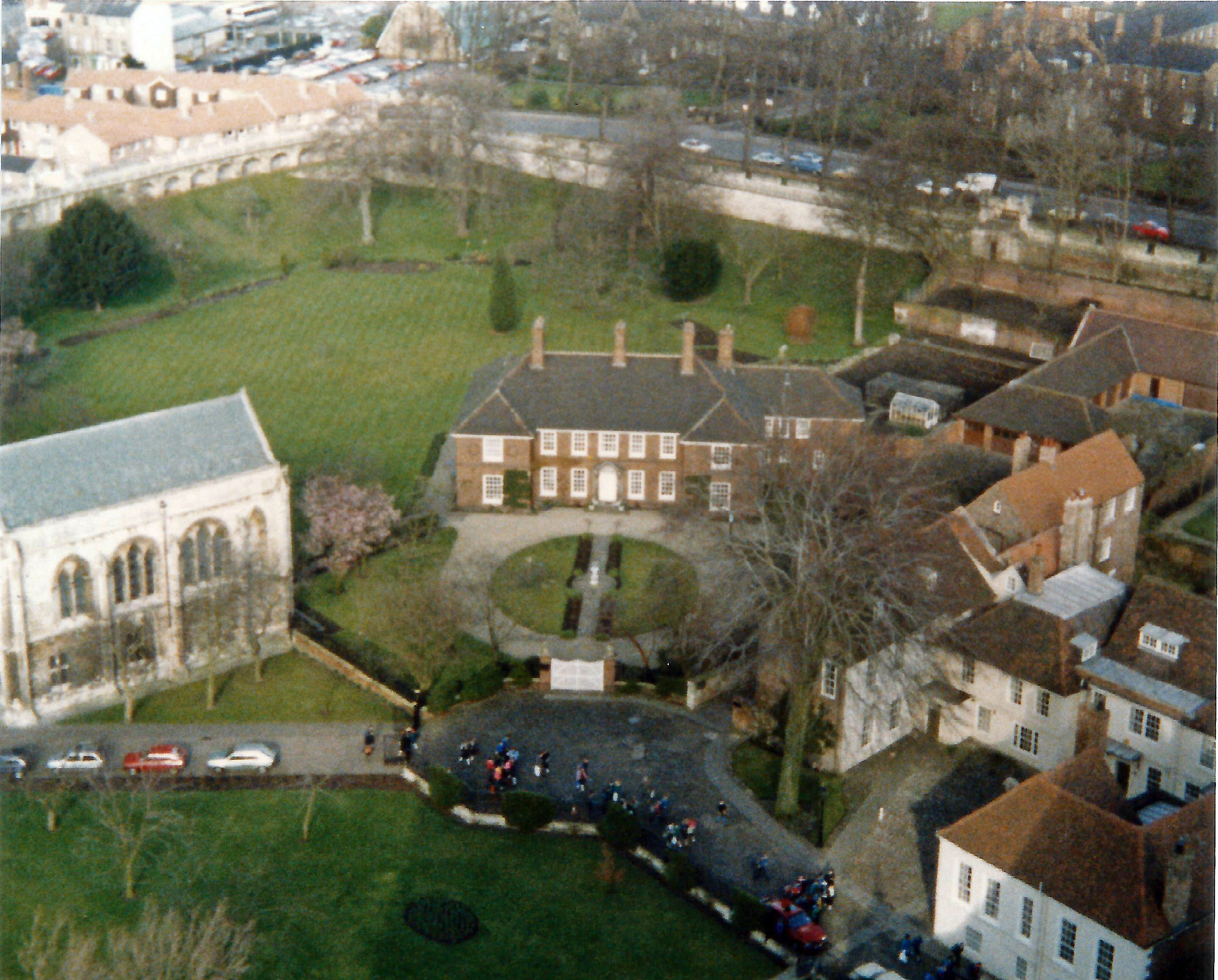
The deanery viewed from York Minster's central tower, looking north (2019)

== See also ==
- Listed buildings in York (within the city walls, northern part)
- Minster Court, adjacent to the east
