= Bothamsall =

Coordinates: 53.253°N 0.989°W

- Village and Civil parish
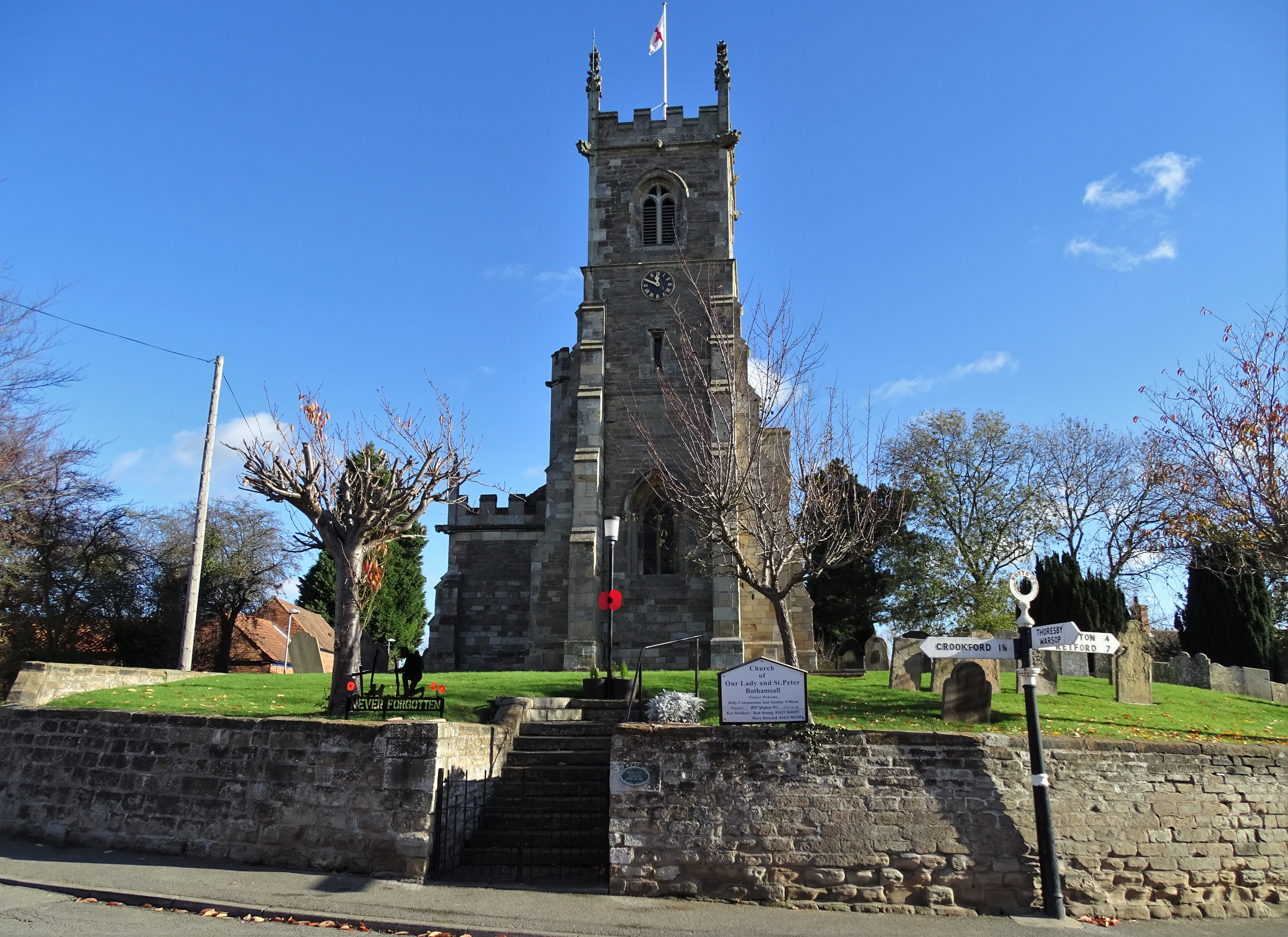
- Church of Our Lady and St Peter

- Location within Nottinghamshire
- Interactive map of Bothamsall
- Area: 3.87 sq mi (10.0 km^{2})
- Population: 216 (2021)
  - Density: 56/sq mi (22/km^{2})
- OS grid reference: SK 674733
  - London: 125 mi (201 km) SE
- District: Bassetlaw
- Shire county: Nottinghamshire
- Region: East Midlands
- Country: England
- Sovereign state: United Kingdom
- Post town: Retford
- Postcode district: DN22
- Dialling code: 01623
- Police: Nottinghamshire
- Fire: Nottinghamshire
- Ambulance: East Midlands
- UK Parliament: Newark

Bothamsall is a village and civil parish in the Bassetlaw district of Nottinghamshire, England.

According to the 2001 United Kingdom census it had a population of 185, increasing (with the inclusion of Bevercotes and Haughton) to 270 at the 2011 Census. In the 2021 census Bothamsall was singularly reported as having 216 residents.

== History and amenities ==
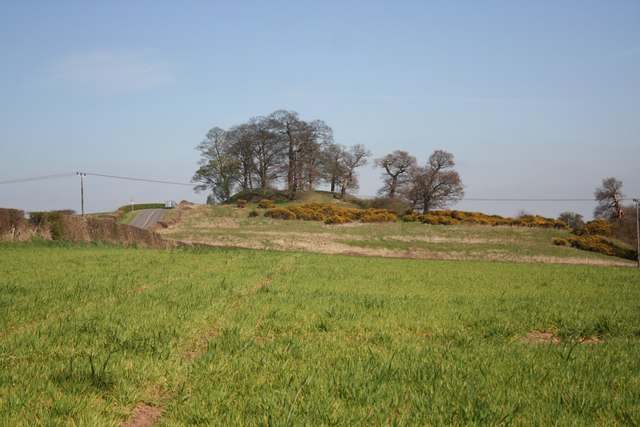
Bothamsall motte

The village is situated about seven miles south of East Retford. The parish church of St Peter and St Mary was built in 1845, replacing an earlier church from which the font was retained. Next to the River Meden at the west end of the village is a small motte-and-bailey castle.

The Robin Hood Way waymarked long-distance footpath passes through the village.

== Lound Hall ==
Lound Hall is a substantial 70-room country house which sits on the outskirts of Bothamsall village. The current house was built in the 1930s for Sir Harald Peake, although there has been a manor house on the site since the 1700s. The ruins of Haughton Chapel can be found within the grounds of the estate. The Hall was requisitioned during World War II for use as a base for the Royal Air Force, and then later became a military hospital for injured servicemen. The hall was sold in 2009 to couple, Robert Everist and Susan Mills. 2010 saw the start of a significant and vital restoration.

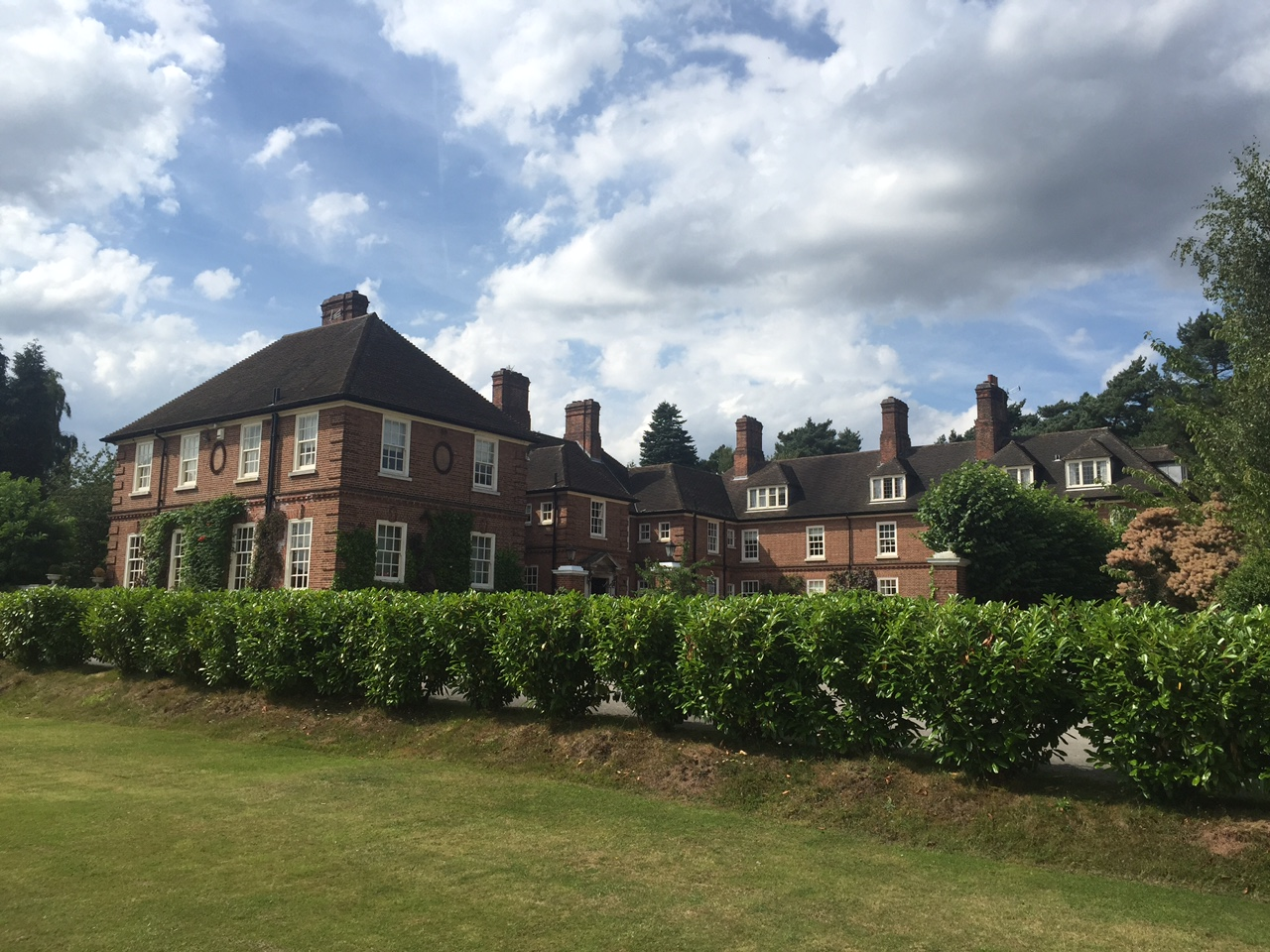
Lound Hall

== Bothamsall Hall ==
Bothamsall Hall is a fine stone country house built by the Duke of Newcastle which sits on the hill in the centre of Bothamsall village. The original house dated back to c.1673 and was demolished and re built in c.1845 along with the church by the Duke of Newcastle, the stone and mullion windows were recycled from the demolished 15th century Worksop Manor with a later wing added in 1906. The hall enjoys a prominent position overlooking the village and surrounding parkland. The hall has been refurbished over the past five years (2012 onwards) most recently the coach house and stables which have been converted into annex accommodation by the current owners.

== See also ==
- Listed buildings in Bothamsall
