= Rutherford and Syme =

British architect

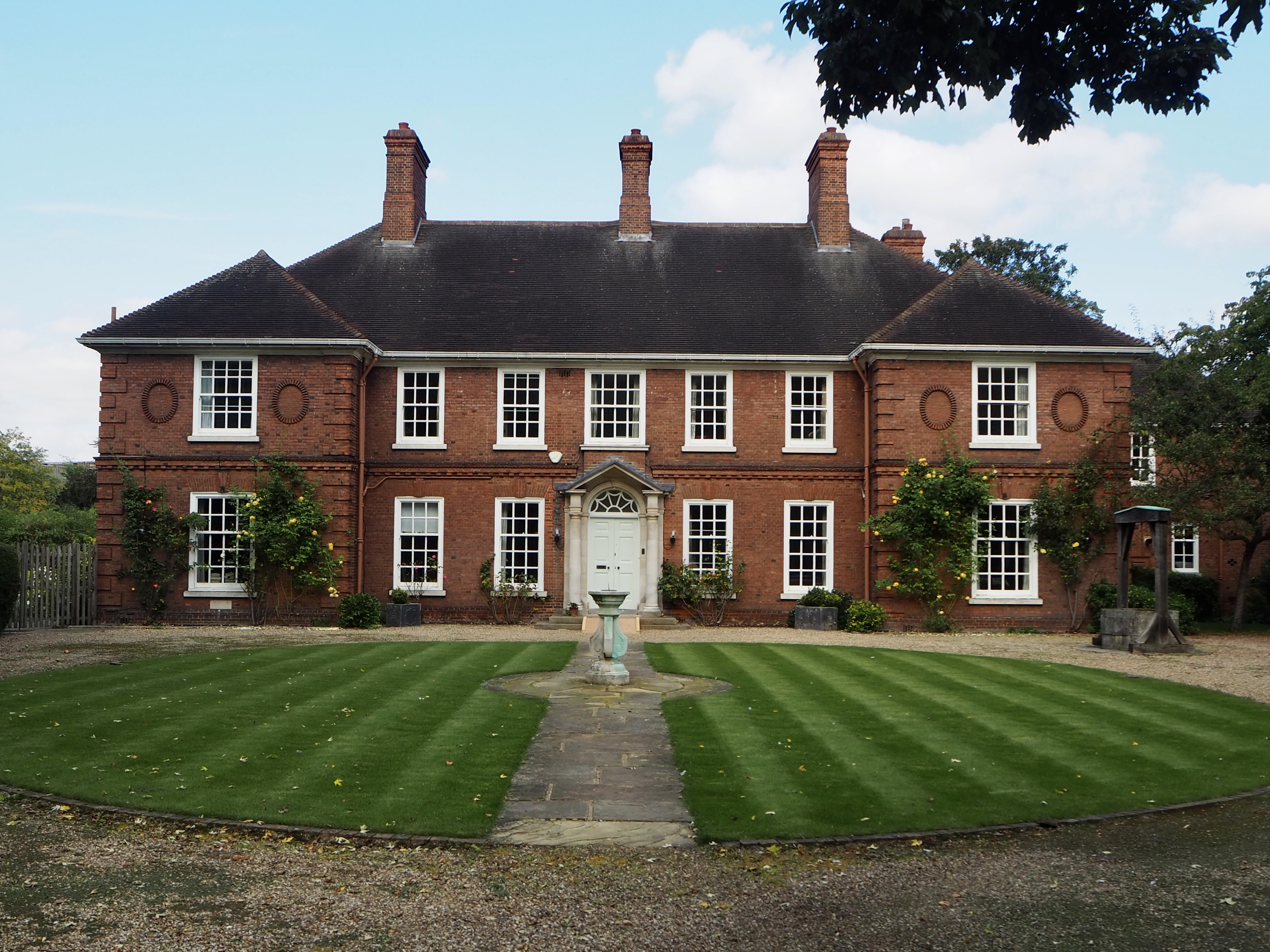
- York Deanery, designed by Rutherford and Syme, was completed in 1939

Practice information
- Key architects: James Hervey Rutherford; John Stuart Syme
- Founded: 1927
- Dissolved: 1939
- Location: Perth, Scotland

Significant works and honors
- Buildings: York Deanery

Rutherford and Syme was a British architectural firm composed of James Hervey Rutherford (1874–1946) and John Stuart Syme (1872–1958). Rutherford was a Scot and, after graduating university, he moved to London initially, then to Lendal in York.

The firm was established in January 1927, with Rutherford balancing both the new venture and one he had with Walter Henry Brierley, who died just over a month earlier.

The Rutherford and Syme practice was dissolved in 1939, at which point Rutherford continued the Brierley practice until his death in 1946. Syme worked alone until 1943, at which point he merged his business with Cecil Leckenby. Syme died on 12 December 1958.

York Library opened in 1927, shortly after the death of Brierley. Its design is attributed to Brierley, Rutherford and Syme.

One of the partnership's final projects was that of York Deanery, which was completed in 1939.

== Selected notable works ==
- York Library (1927) – now Grade II listed
- Welbeck Woodhouse 1930-31
- Easthorpe Hall, Malton
- Kingsthorpe House, Pickering 1934 (restoration)
- St William's College, York 1934 (restoration)
- Merchants' Hall, Fossgate, York 1936 (restoration)
- Altar, credence table, missal stand, oak candlesticks and communicants’ kneeler, Easingwold Parish Church 1937 (carved by Robert Thompson)
- Lound Hall, Tuxford 1937
- York Deanery (1939) – now Grade II listed
