= Goddards House and Garden =

Grade I listed building in York, England

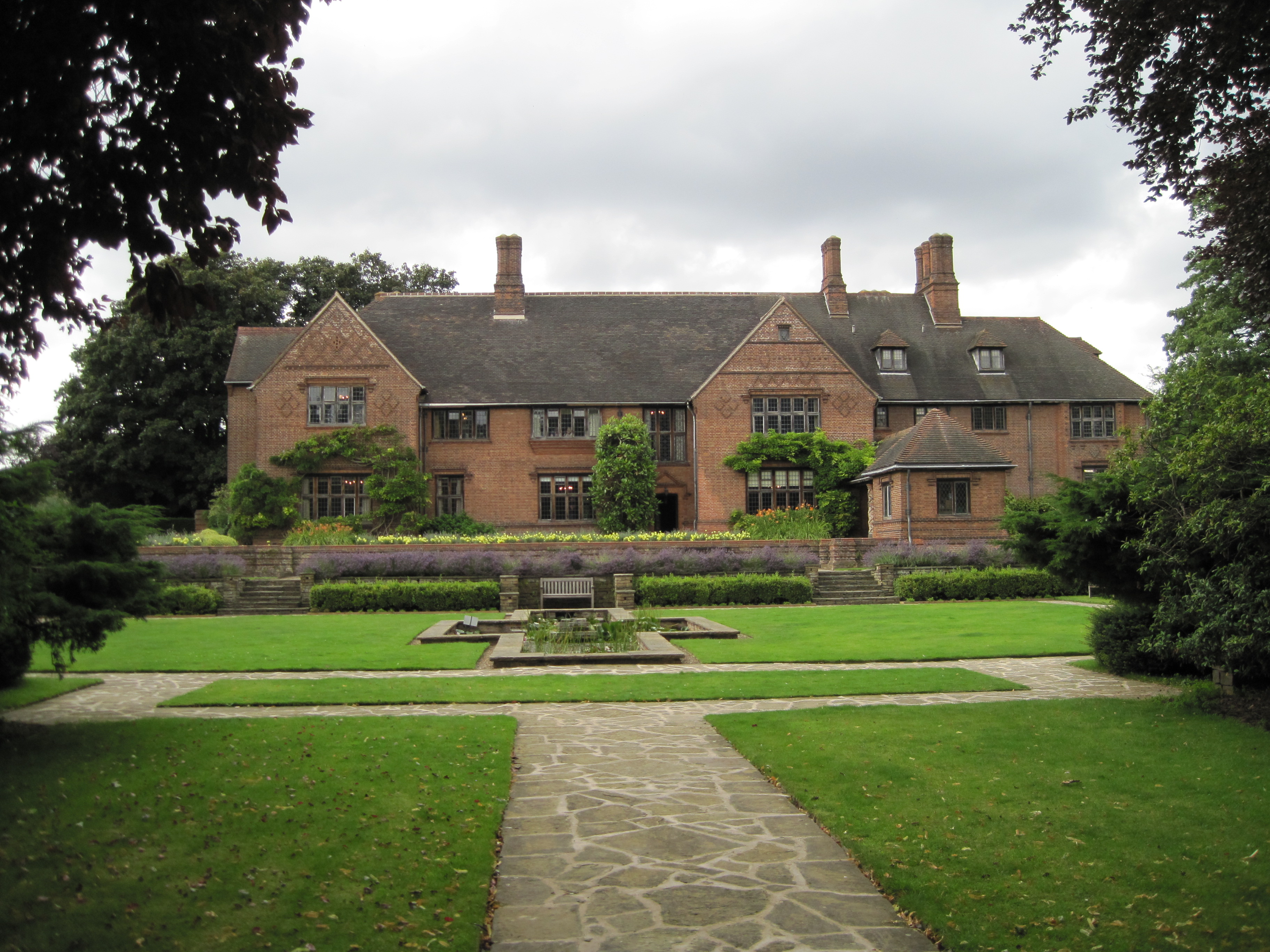
- View of the south side of the house

- Location within North Yorkshire
- Established: 2006 – Garden; 2012 – House and Garden
- Location: Dringhouses, York, England
- Coordinates: 53.940258°N 1.104047°W
- Type: Arts and Crafts; Historic House Museum
- Visitors: 24,500 (2015/6)
- Director: David Morgan
- Architects: Walter Brierley; George Dillistone (Garden)
- Owner: National Trust
- Public transit access: Buses from York station to Dringhouses
- Parking: See website; On site: accessible parking
- Website: Official website

Listed Building – Grade I
- Official name: Goddards and attached gateway, terrace and loggia to side and rear
- Designated: 24 June 1983
- Reference no.: 1256461
- Client: Noel Goddard Terry
- Completed: 1927

Listed Building – Grade II*
- Official name: Number 25 including carriage entrance
- Designated: 24 June 1983
- Reference no.: 1256505

Goddards House and Garden is an Arts and Crafts house in Dringhouses, York, England. It was built in 1927 for Noel and Kathleen Terry of the famed chocolate-manufacturing family Terry's with the house designed by local architect Walter Brierley and the garden by George Dillistone. The National Trust acquired the property in 1984 to use as regional offices and the garden is open to visitors seasonally. The house is a Grade I listed building and the carriage entrance to the property is Grade II* listed.

== Design ==
=== House ===
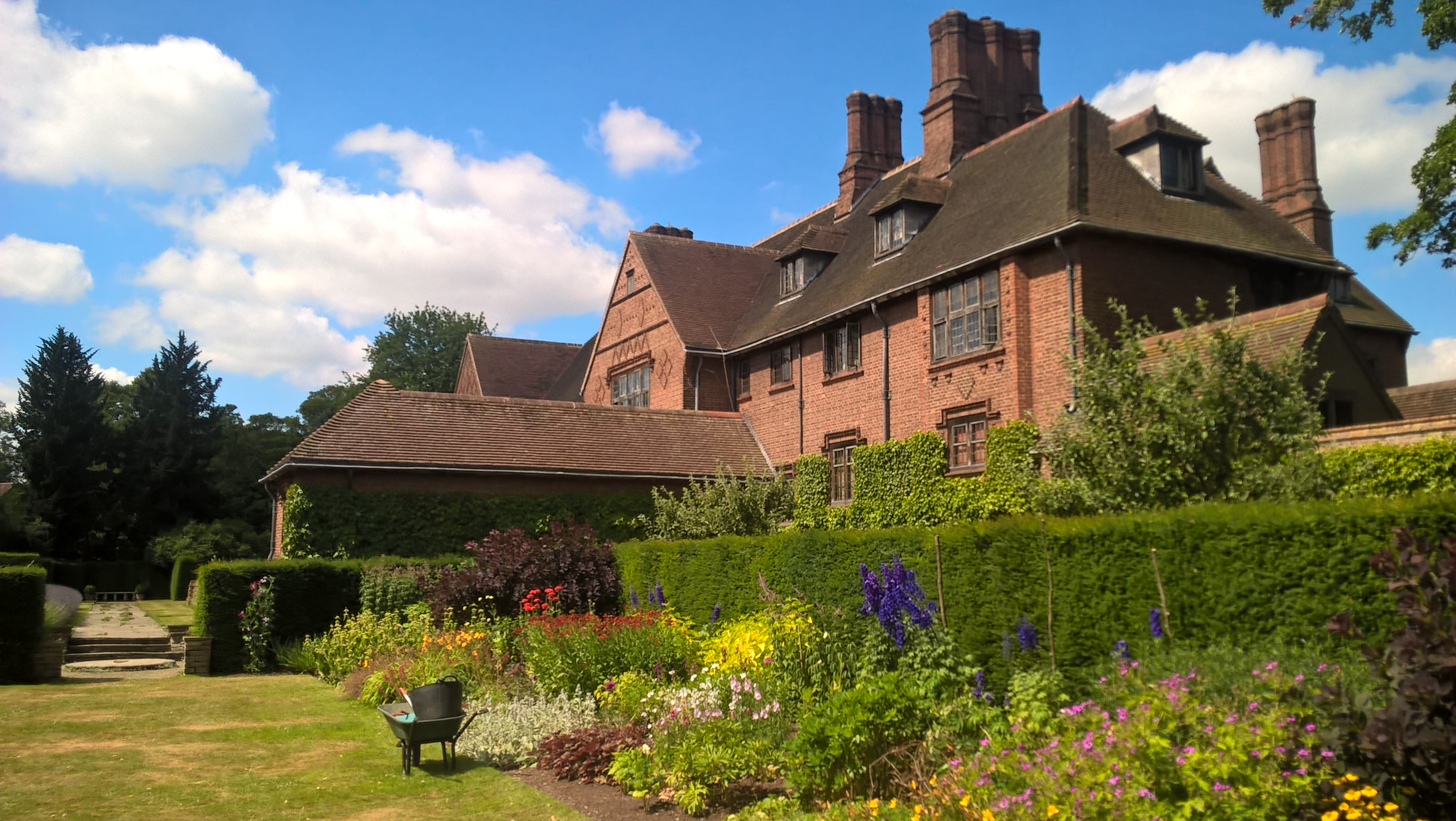
View of the house and herbaceous border

Goddards was the last major project of Walter Brierley who died in 1926 whilst the house was still under construction. His own home (the Grade II*-listed Bishopsbarns) on St George's Place, York, was on the same street that Noel and Kathleen Terry lived in and 0.6 miles (1 km) from Goddards. One of the notable architectural features of the house is the vaulted ceiling in the drawing room which is similar to Brierley's own home with the plasterwork in both houses attributed to George Bankart, probably George P Bankart in both cases, rather than his son George E Bankart, with whom he wrote books about the craft. The National Heritage List for England describes Goddards as "the finest surviving example of the work of Walter Brierley, the Lutyens of the north", and it still retains many of the original fixtures including its Arts and Crafts wallpapers and panelling and the staircase with its oak carving.

The exterior of the house features handmade locally produced bricks arranged in geometric patterns and decorative chimney stacks typical of a Brierley building. Goddards was built by William Anelay whose initial estimate for the project, including the carriage entrance, was £25,980 (equivalent to £1,370,000 in 2025), however the work suffered a number of delays and was not finished until after the family had moved into the house. Copies of the original plans are displayed in the house.

=== Garden ===
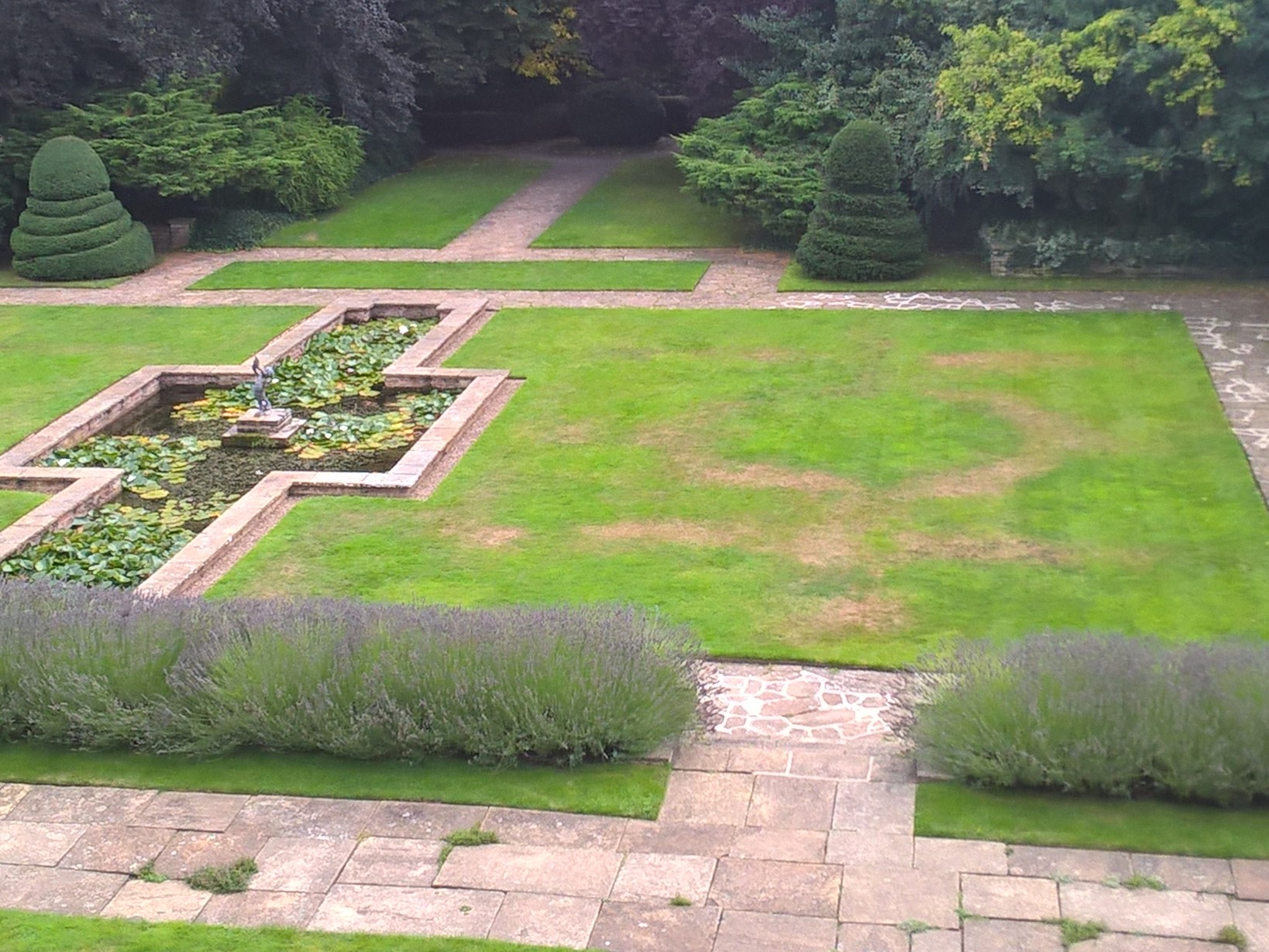
The lawn beside the lily pool was originally a rose garden, the layout of which is revealed by cropmarks.

In 1925 George Dillistone, a landscape architect from Tunbridge Wells who worked with Lutyens at Castle Drogo, was hired to design the garden at Goddards. The design evolved over a number of years and plans were still being developed as late as 1935, by which time Dillistone had become vice-president of the Institute of Landscape Architects. In keeping with the style of the house, the four acre garden at Goddards was divided into several distinct areas, including a terrace and a series of rooms separated by shrubs, hedges and a herbaceous border; all of these elements illustrate the Arts and Crafts nature of the garden.

The enclosures included a tennis court (restored in 2016) and a bowling green used as a croquet lawn. The centrepiece of the garden is a cruciform lily pool which is fed from a semi-circular reflecting pool and was originally surrounded by a rose garden. Beyond this area the garden slopes downwards to York Racecourse, (Knavesmire) across which it was possible to walk to where, in 1926, Terry's had built their factory, with its distinctive clock tower visible from the garden. Typical of this style of garden the landscaping becomes less formal further from the house with paths leading down through a rock garden at the far end of the garden.

The wildlife in the garden included a colony of midwife toads, also referred to as bell toads, and it was once home to a number of exotic pets including axolotls and green lizards which were introduced into the garden in the early 1930s. In 2016 the National Trust revealed plans to recreate the original planting schemes drawn up by Dillistone almost ninety years earlier.

=== Carriage entrance ===
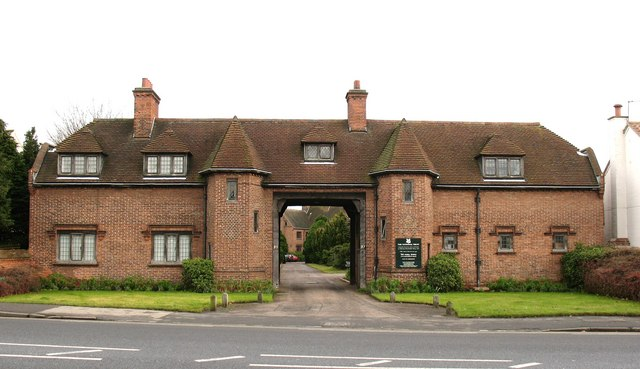
The carriage entrance facing on to Tadcaster Road, Dringhouses

Brierley was also the architect for the Grade II*-listed lodge at the entrance to Goddards, a red brick structure with staircase turrets which incorporates a flat roofed motor house. It was originally the home of the Terry's chauffeur, and remains in residential use.

== The Terry family at Goddards ==
Noel Terry (1889–1980) was the great-grandson of Joseph Terry, the first Terry of the family confectionery business. Noel was brought up at Trentholme, the home of his maternal grandfather, located 0.8 miles (1.3 km) north of Goddards, and opposite the Elmbank Hotel which, at the time, was the home of Sidney Leetham, an uncle of Kathleen Leetham (1892–1980). The Leetham family were owners of a large flour-milling business in the Hungate area of York. Kathleen lived at Aldersyde, a large house that her father Henry Ernest Leetham commissioned in 1895 and which is located 0.5 miles (0.8 km) south of Goddards.

In 1915, Noel's brother, J. E. Harold Terry, married Kathleen's sister, Constance Leetham and Noel and Kathleen were also married having overcome the objections of her father who had initially opposed their relationship. Soon after the marriage Noel was sent to France due to the First World War and in 1916 was wounded at the Battle of the Somme whilst serving with the 5th West Yorkshire Regiment. After he returned home they started a family together and by 1925 had two sons, Peter and Kenneth, a daughter, Betty, and plans to move to a larger house. From 1927 Goddards would become the family home of the Terry's and their children – with their youngest son Richard being born the following year. The name of the house came from Noel Terry's middle name, which was that of his grandmother, Frances Goddard, first wife of Sir Joseph Terry.

By the 1930s Noel had become a managing director at Terry's and it was at this time that the company introduced two of their most famous products – Terry's All Gold and the Chocolate Orange. When production was interrupted by the Second World War Noel became a Controller with the Royal Observer Corps and was awarded an MBE in 1943. His son Kenneth served in the RAF and was awarded the DFC in 1942. He died in 1944 and is commemorated on the local war memorial (also by Brierley). Noel continued to work at Terry's until 1970, and his son Peter, who had joined Terry's in 1945, became deputy managing director.

Although the house was built in the Arts and Crafts style it would become furnished with a large assortment of Georgian furniture and clocks which Noel Terry collected throughout his life. It is thought that his enthusiasm in antiques was partly inspired by his father-in-law who had been a collector of porcelain and jade. His interest in history also led to his involvement with York Civic Trust, of which he was honorary treasurer for many years. After Noel and Kathleen died in 1980 Noel's collection was put on display at Fairfax House, in York, a Georgian house museum renovated by the Civic Trust.

== National Trust era ==
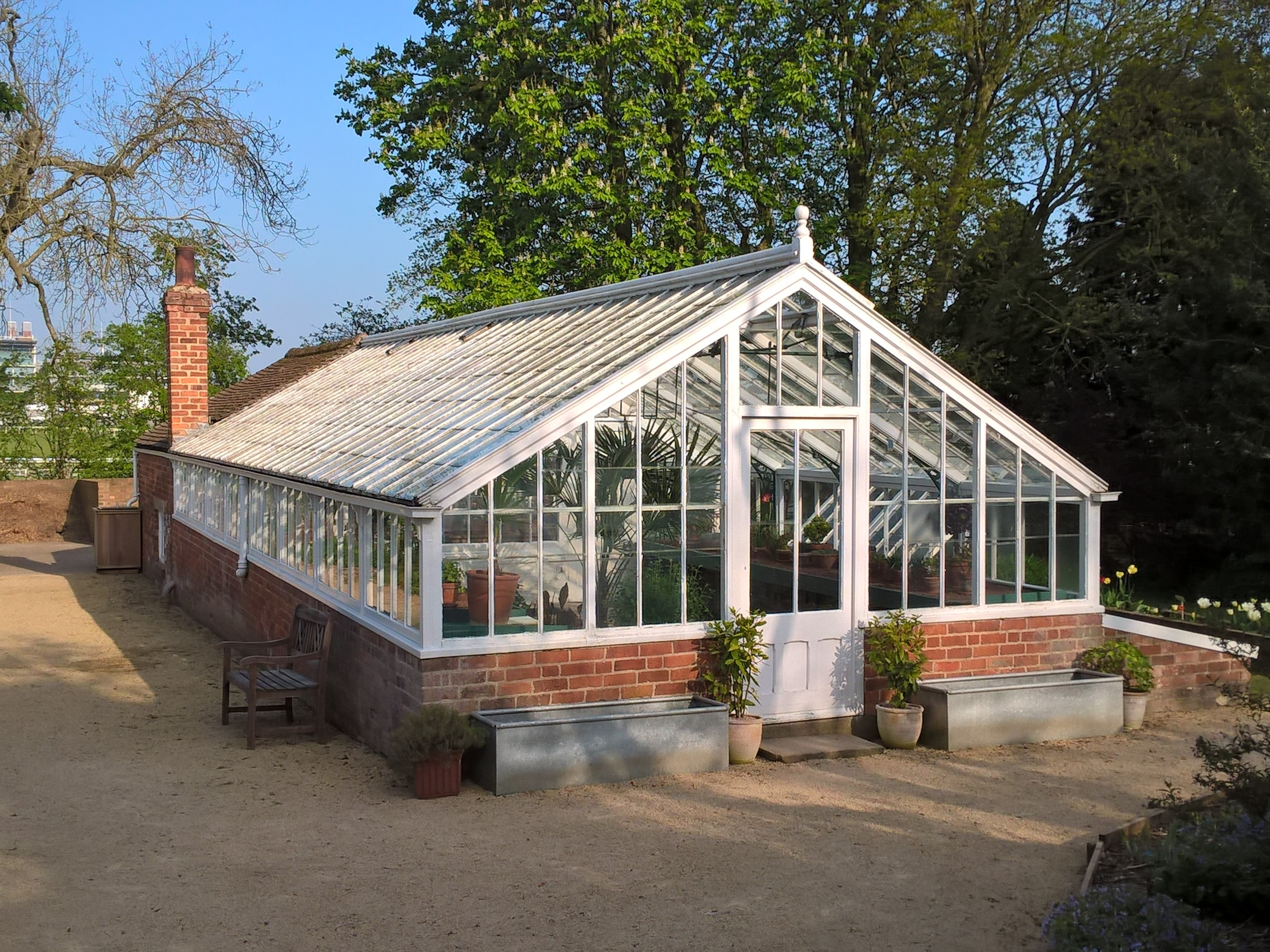
The glasshouse at Goddards was made by Richardson of Darlington and restored by the National Trust.

When the National Trust took over Goddards it was initially only for use as regional offices rather than a visitor attraction. However, the garden was opened to the public in 2006 and the house in 2012. The rooms displayed period furniture used to recreate the atmosphere of the 1930s when the house was at its busiest and the family business at its zenith. As well as owning a chocolate factory Terry's also had its own tearoom and shop in York, whose cakes inspired the food served in the dining room at Goddards. Exhibits at Goddards included decorative packaging from Terry's chocolates and a scale model of the Terry's factory. In 2014 and 2015 Goddards was listed as a finalist in the 'Visitor Attraction of the Year (Under 50,000 Visitors)' category of the VisitYork Tourism Awards. In 2016 the National Trust put forward plans to expand the catering facilities and use more of the house to display its collection of chocolate memorabilia, citing the increase in visitor numbers between 2011 (5,608), before the house opened, and 2015/16 (24,500) as a reason for the proposed change. The National Trust closed the property at the end of October 2016 for conservation and maintenance work and re-opened it in April 2017. The property closed to the public again in March 2020, with only the gardens subsequently reopening for selected visitor days.

== See also ==
- Grade I listed buildings in the City of York
- Listed buildings in York (within the city walls, southern part)
