= Gatekeeper's lodge =

Building situated at the entrance to an estate

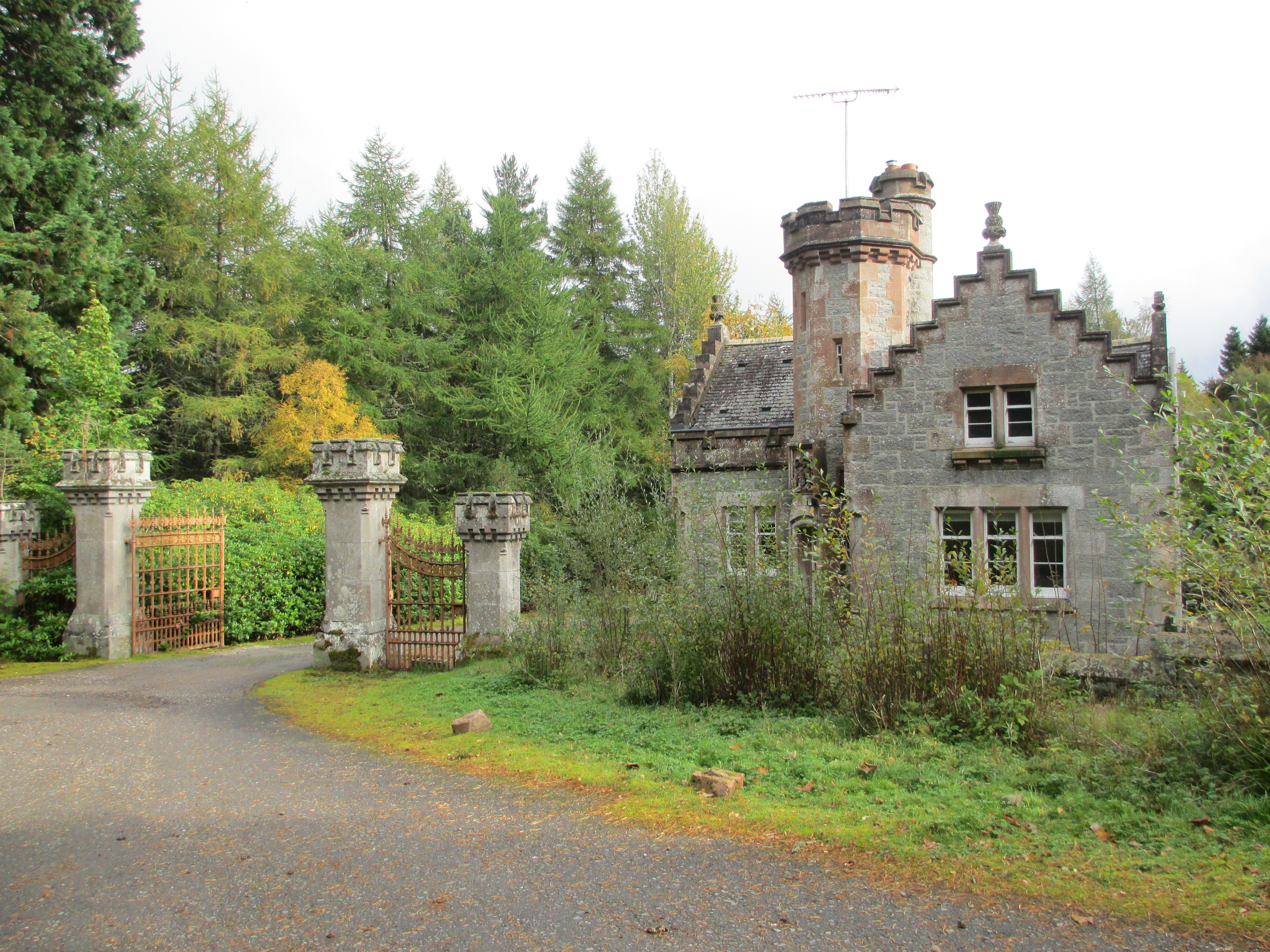
Gatekeeper's lodge in the Scottish baronial style at Moy House, Moray.

A gatekeeper's lodge or gate lodge is a small, often decorative building, situated at the entrance to the estate of a mansion or country house. Originally intended as the office and accommodation for a gatekeeper who was employed by the landowner to control access to the property, they fell out of use in the early 20th century but surviving examples are often preserved and can sometimes be used as domestic housing.

== History ==
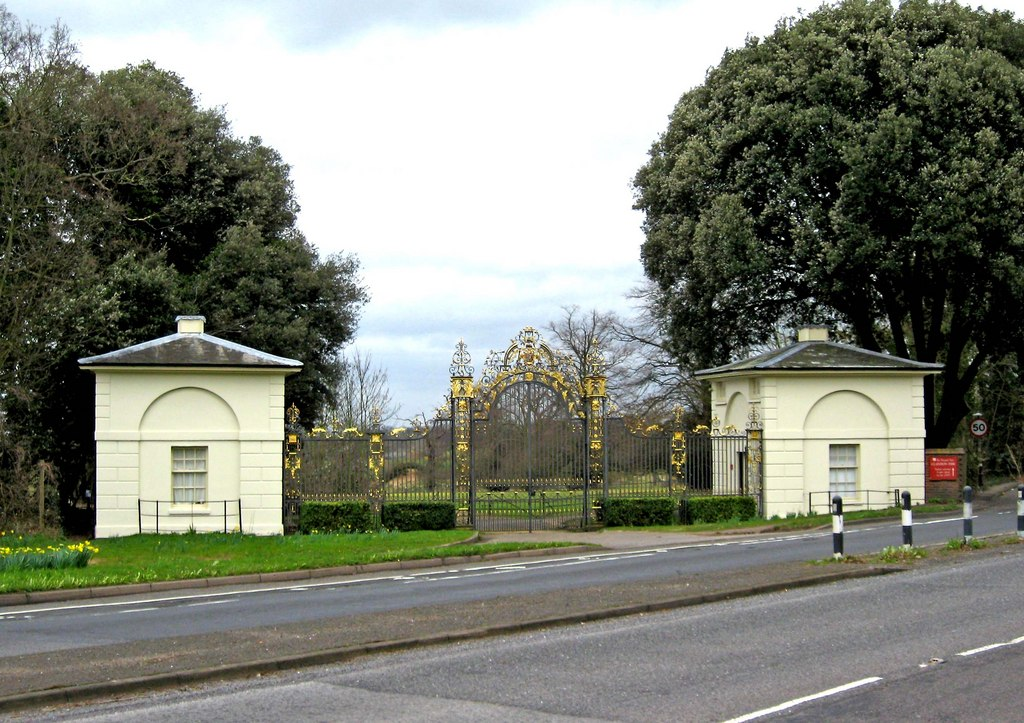
A pair of gate lodges in the Palladian style at Clandon Park House, England

Estate lodges originated from the gatehouses of medieval monasteries and manor houses. Timothy Mowl and Brian Earnshaw, in their study Trumpet at a Distant Gate: The Lodge as Prelude to the Country House, cite the Porter's Lodge Tower at Denbigh Castle, and the lodge at New College, Oxford as antecedent examples. They became fashionable in the Georgian era along with landscape gardens. Initially these lodges were functional wooden buildings, intended to retain livestock and deter intruders, but during the 18th century, they developed into a visual statement, designed to give an initial impression of the landowner's wealth and taste. A notable mid-18th century example is the Worcester Lodge at Badminton House, Gloucestershire, designed in 1748 by William Kent for the Duke of Beaufort. British architect John Buonarotti Papworth, wrote that park gates and their associated lodges should be:

...built to catch the attention of the traveller, for the entrance of a property effecting the earliest impression on the mind of a visitor, it is of some importance that it should be of the favourable kind.

— Rural Residences: Consisting of a Series of Designs for Cottages, Decorated Cottages, Small Villas and other Ornamental Buildings (1818)

Lodges were often designed to give a visitor a foretaste of the big house itself. Another British architect, Robert Lugar, advised:

Lodges should be in due character with the house, and mark its style distinctly. A more flagrant error can scarcely be committed than to give the lodge a character opposite to that of the house. If the house be Gothic, make the lodge Gothic also; and if Grecian, then let the lodge be Grecian; but mixing one style with the other, as is frequently seen, makes us think little of the mind that thus invades every idea of common sense...

— Architectural Sketches for Cottages, Rural Dwellings and Villas (1805)

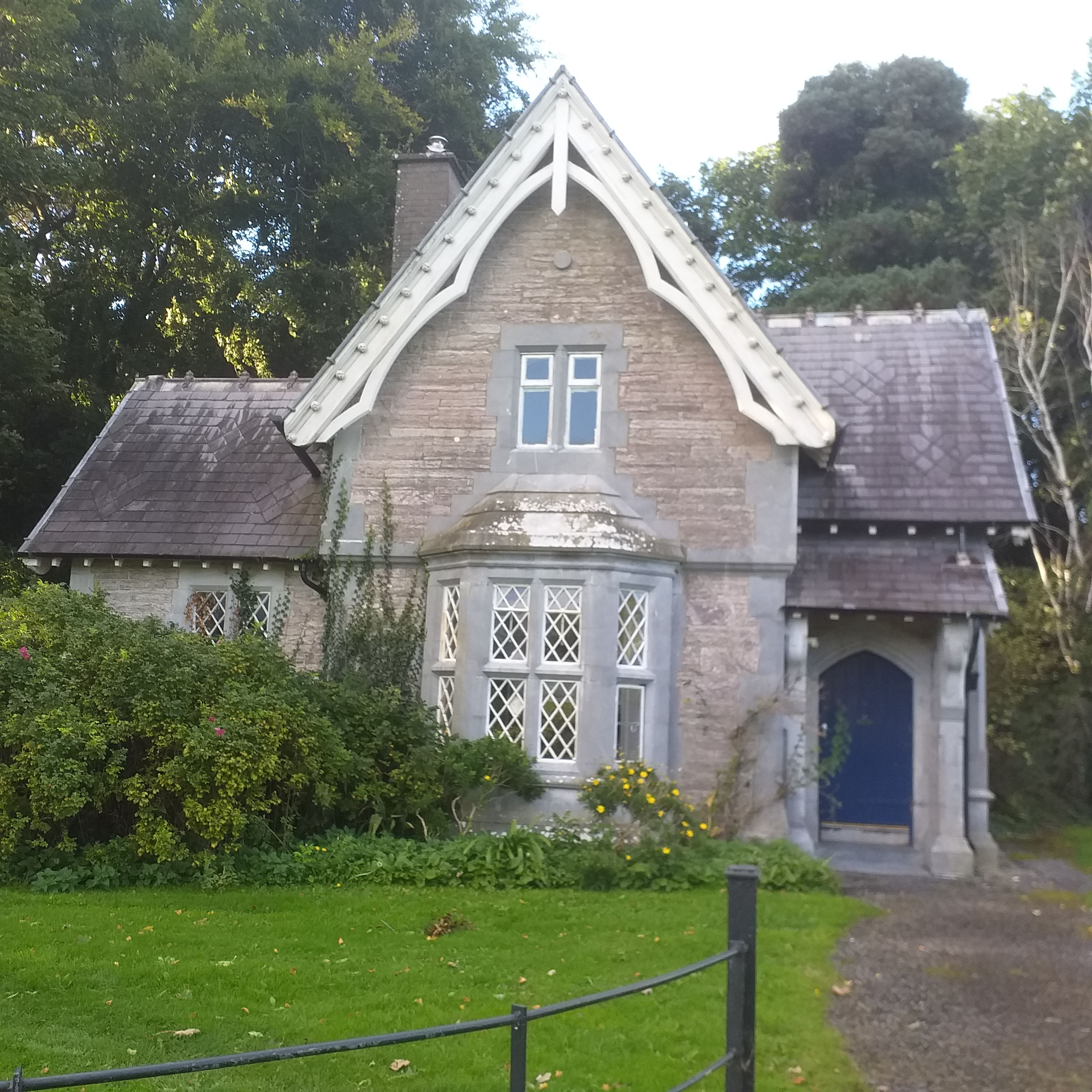
Gate lodge at Muckross House, County Kerry.

An example of such a Gothic Revival lodge is Eccleston Hill Lodge on the Eaton Hall estate in Cheshire, designed by John Douglas in 1881. Later in the 19th century, under the influence of Romanticism, lodges were sometimes built to resemble idealised country cottages. Gatekeeper's lodges were also built at the entrances to other enclosed spaces such as schools, public parks and cemeteries.

The accommodation inside a lodge was generally rather small, sometimes consisting of only two rooms. The gatekeepers themselves were often retired servants, who besides being available to open the gates at any time, were required to keep the gateway and the surrounding grounds in order. Following the First World War, the huge number of staff required to run large houses and their grounds were no longer available and lodges began to be abandoned, even on those estates that escaped closure. However, lodges are now often preserved and larger examples can be converted into modern homes. A survey in Ireland completed in 2016 showed that of about 10,000 lodges identified from old maps, about forty per cent had been demolished and a further thirty per cent were in a ruinous state.

== Gallery ==
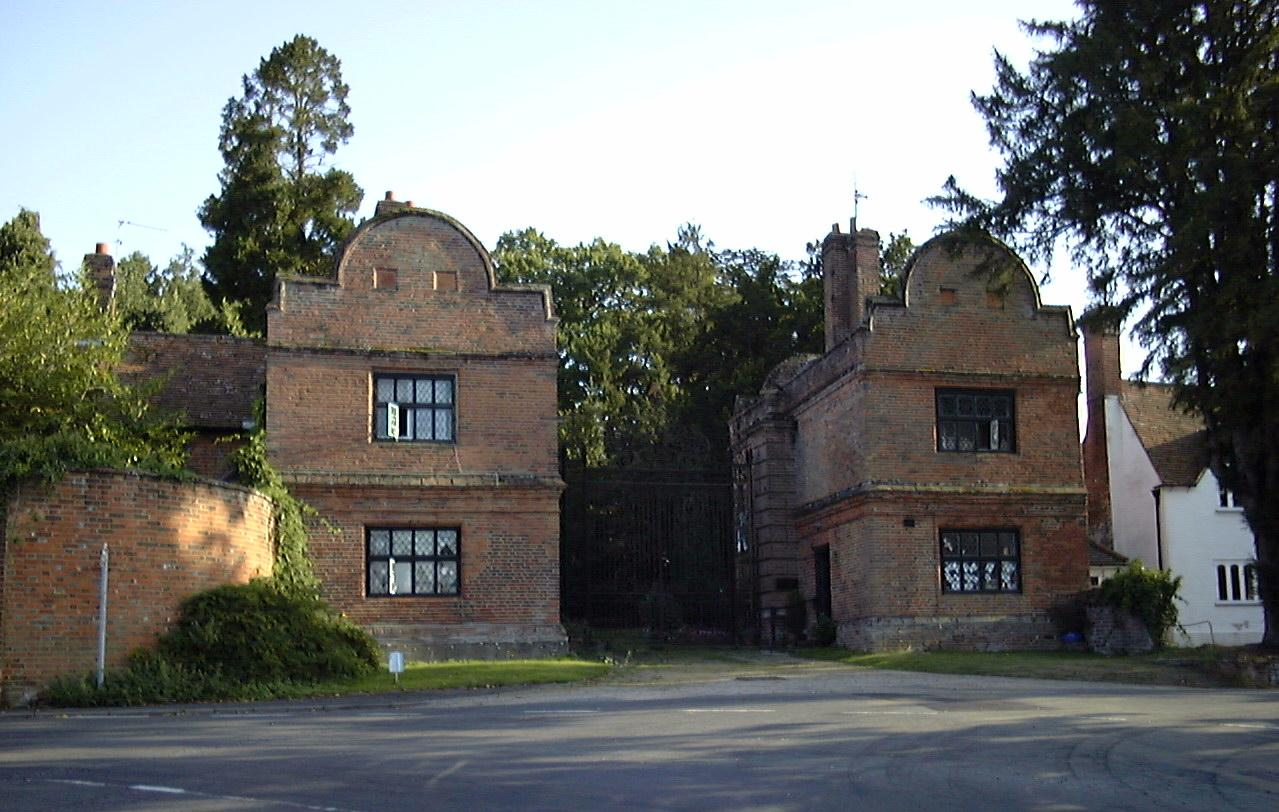
Pair of gate lodges in the Jacobean style at Aldermaston Court, England

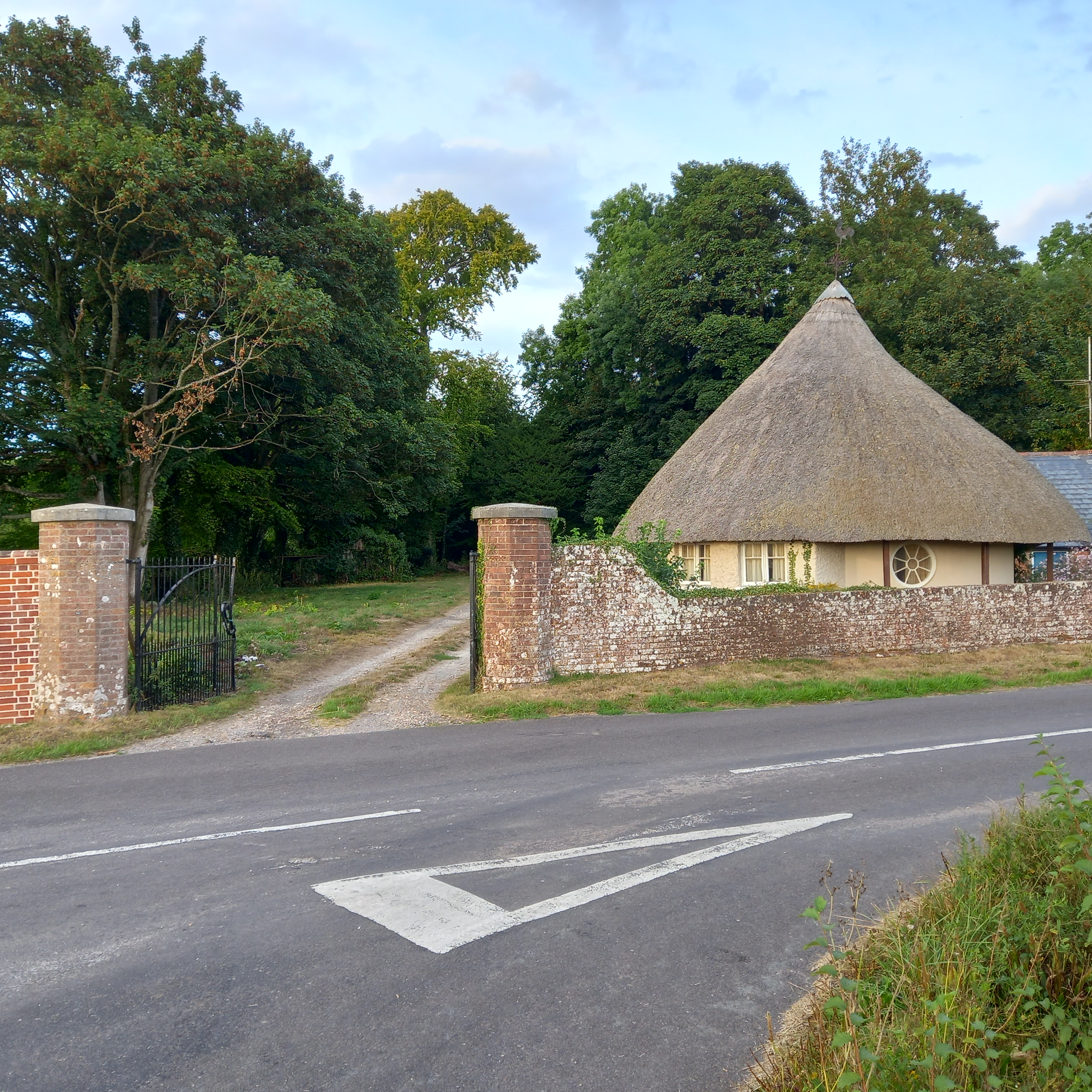
Gate lodge in the style of a rural thatched cottage at Charborough Park, England

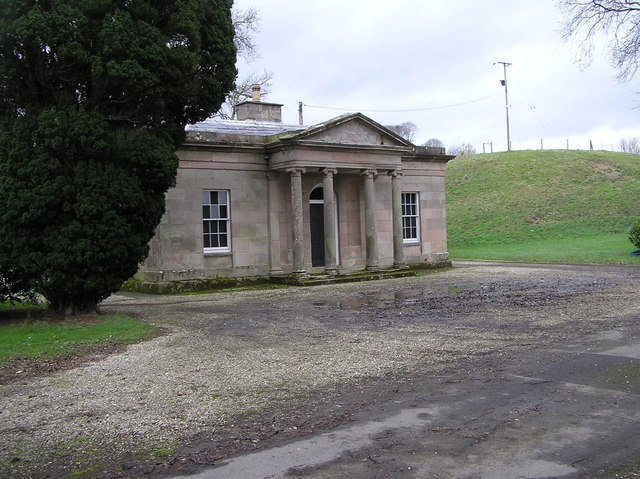
Gate lodge with an Ionic order portico at Drenagh, Northern Ireland

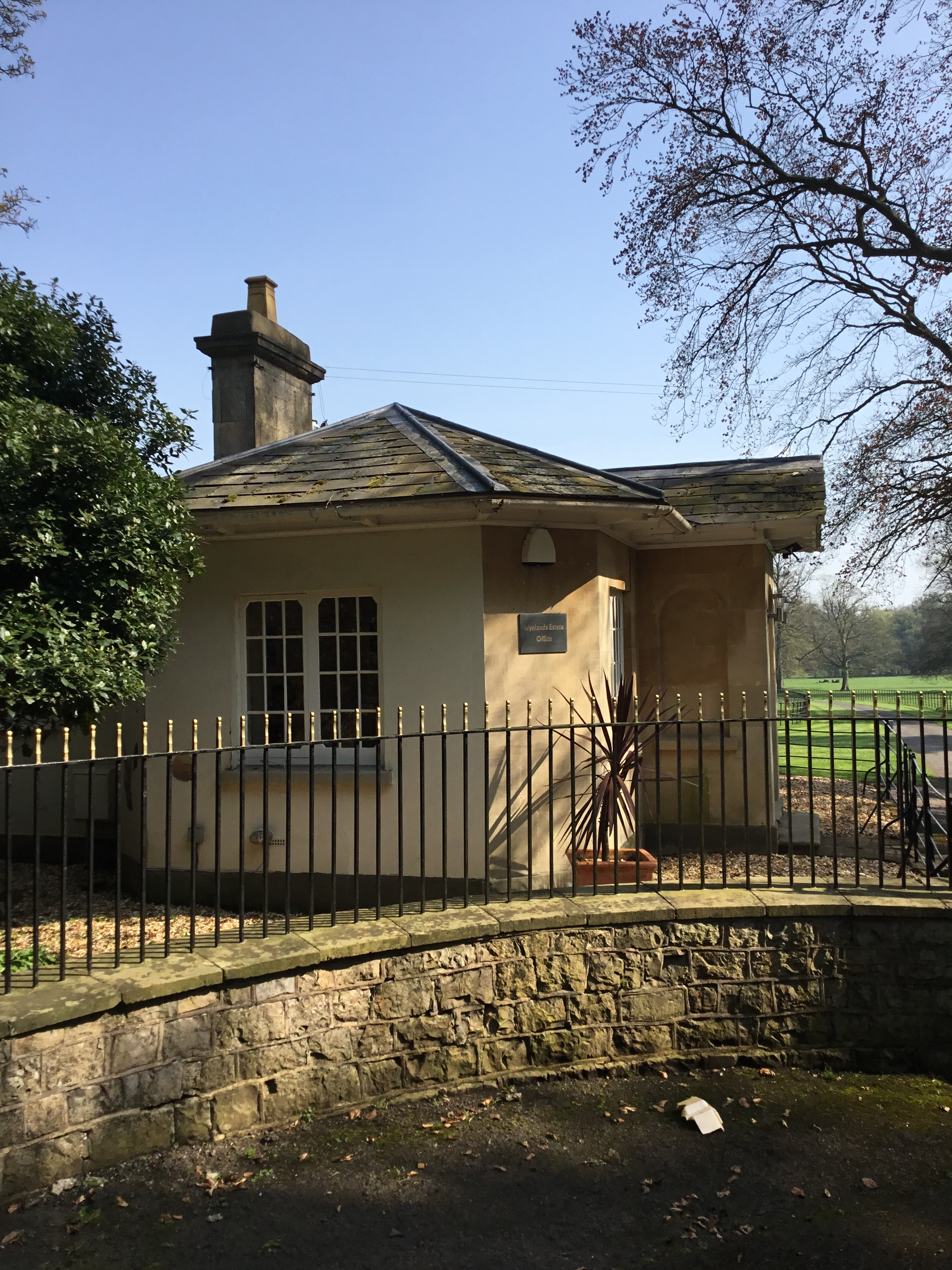
Robert Lugar's lodge at the entrance to the Wyelands Estate, Monmouthshire, Wales

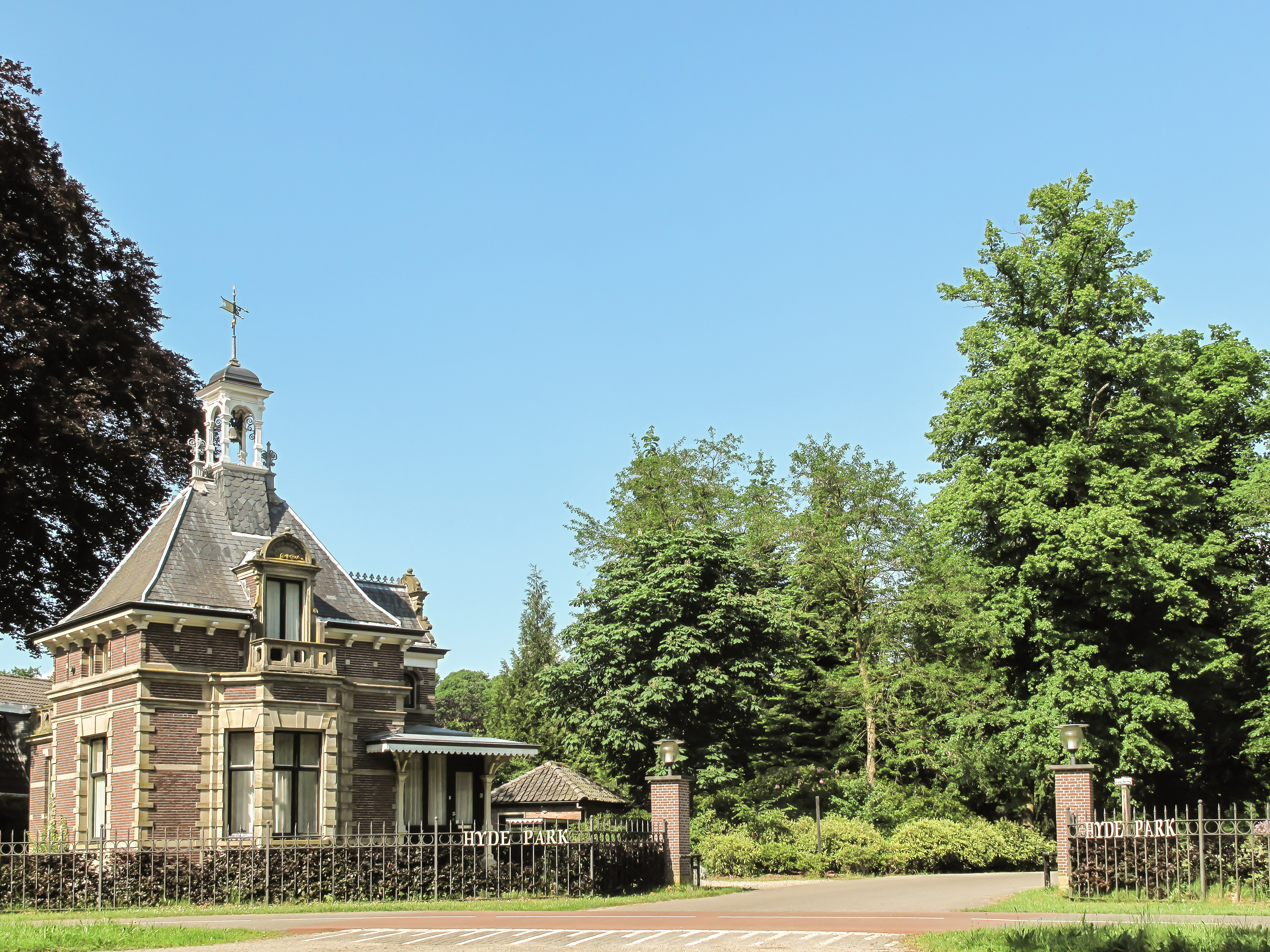
Gate lodge in the Baroque style at Hydepark in Doorn, Netherlands (Dutch Wikipedia article)

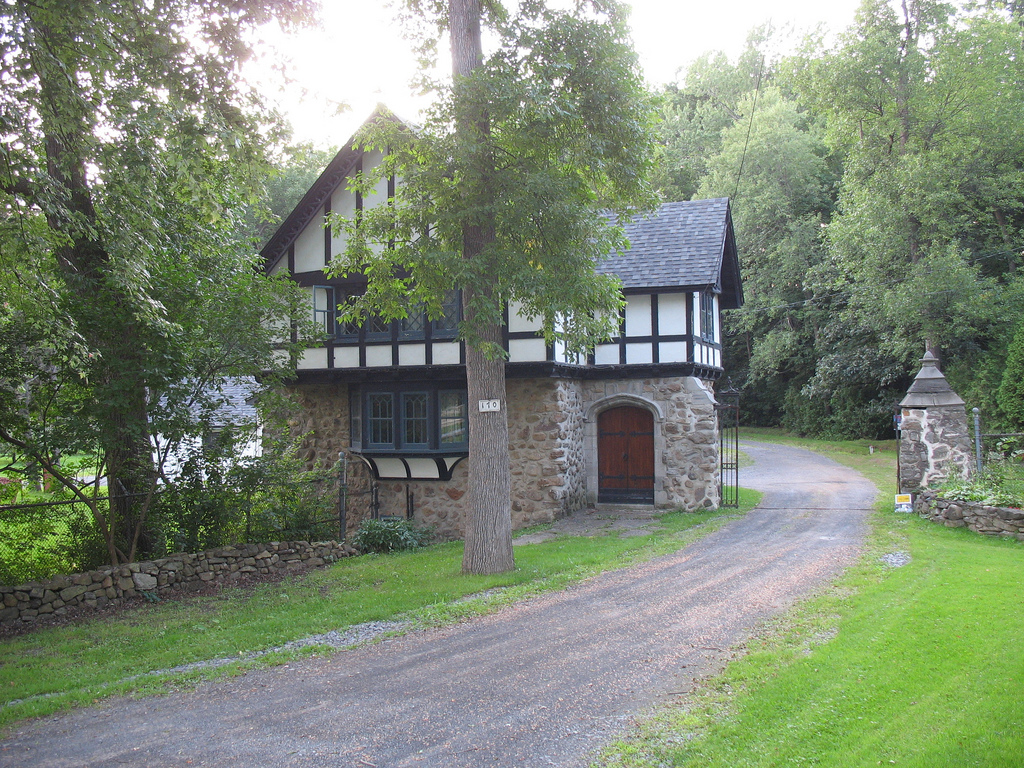
Gate lodge in the Tudor Revival style at Senneville, Quebec, Canada
