= Listed buildings in York (Acomb Ward) =

Acomb is a ward in the unitary authority of the City of York, North Yorkshire, England. It contains six listed buildings that are recorded in the National Heritage List for England. All the listed buildings are designated at Grade II, the lowest of the three grades, which is applied to "buildings of national importance and special interest". The ward contains the former village of Acomb, later a suburb of the city of York, to the west of its centre. The listed buildings consist of two houses, a former hotel, two churches and a war memorial.

== Buildings ==
| Name and location | Photograph | Date | Notes |
|---|---|---|---|
| 25 The Green; 53.95558°N 1.13061°W | | c. 1830 | The house is in brick, pebbledashed on the front, with a pantile roof. There are two storeys and two bays. The doorway is on the right bay, and the windows are sashes. |
| St Stephen's Church; 53.95598°N 1.12900°W | | 1831–32 | The church, replacing an earlier church on the site, was designed by G. T. Andrews, and later extended. It is built in limestone with a slate roof, and has a cruciform plan, consisting of a nave, north and south transepts, a porch in the southwest angle, a chancel with a north vestry, and a west steeple. The steeple has a tower with angle buttresses, chamfered lancet windows with lozenge openings above, and a broach spire with a weathervane. |
| Former Hill Hotel; 53.95541°N 1.12782°W | | c. 1845 | The house, at one time a hotel, is stuccoed, and has overhanging eaves on paired brackets and a slate roof. There are two storeys, three bays, and a recessed bay on the left. The middle bay projects under a pedimented gable, it contains a doorway with an architrave and a narrow fanlight, and above it is a balcony with low railings on brackets. To the right is a canted bay window, and the other windows are sashes with louvred shutters. |
| 62 York Road; 53.95536°N 1.12824°W | | 1848 | The school, later used for other purposes, is in mottled brick, with limestone dressings and a slate roof. There is a single storey, the gable end faces the road, and on the right return are three bays and a porch. The gable end has diagonal buttresses and a three-light window with a transom. On the return are buttresses and mullioned windows; all the lights have segmental heads. The porch has a hipped roof, and contains a doorway with a chamfered surround and a shouldered arch. |
| War memorial 53.95508°N 1.12965°W | | c. 1920 | The war memorial on The Green is in limestone. It consists of a Latin cross carved with a wreath and dove in the centre of the cross head. It stands on an octagonal base decorated with symbolic carvings, and below are tablets with the names of those lost in the First World War. On the west side of the octagonal steps is a carving of an open book with the names of those lost in the Second World War. |
| Holy Redeemer Church; 53.96641°N 1.12449°W | | 1962–64 | The church was designed by George Pace, and incorporates medieval stone from the demolished church of St Mary Bishophill Senior, together with pink brick, and has a slate roof. It consists of a nave with aisles, a sacristy, a chapel, and a tower with a clock, a louvred gable, and a saddleback roof. Most of the windows are rectangular or lancets, and there is a reset 19th-century Gothic window. The church is linked by a block to the 1930s church hall. |

== See also ==
- Listed buildings in York (outside the city walls, southern part)
