= Bishophill =

Area of the City of York, North Yorkshire, England

Coordinates: 53.956°N 1.086°W

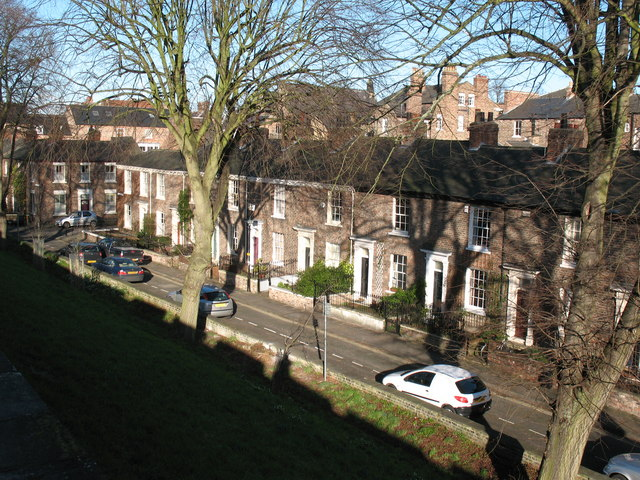
- Bishophill, seen from the city walls

- Location within North Yorkshire
- Unitary authority: City of York
- Ceremonial county: North Yorkshire
- Region: Yorkshire and the Humber
- Country: England
- Sovereign state: United Kingdom
- Post town: YORK
- Postcode district: YO1
- Dialling code: 01904
- Police: North Yorkshire
- Fire: North Yorkshire
- Ambulance: Yorkshire
- UK Parliament: York Central

Bishophill is an area of central York, in England. It lies within the city walls and has been occupied since at least the Roman period.

== Etymology ==
Known as "Bichill" by 1334, the name was also recorded as "Bychehill Lomelyth", "Lomelyth" being a reference to the gate in the walls now called Victoria Bar. The name may be derived from the "Biche Doughter" tower on the walls.

== Geography ==
The district lies within the York city walls, covering the south-western area of the city's core. It slopes down, gently, to the River Ouse. Until the mid-18th century, a stream divided the area, running from Scarcroft Hill eastwards to the moat of the Old Baile. This was significant enough to act as the boundary between the two parishes of St Mary Bishophill Junior and Senior. The main road running through Bishophill is Bishophill Senior, which becomes Cromwell Road. The city walls border the area to the south and east.

The riverside area is now characterised by City of York Council as a "quiet residential area with modern warehouse-style residential buildings", while the streets away from the river are described as a "charming network of terraced streets" and "a tranquil haven with a very strong sense of identity". The area's green spaces run along the ramparts of the city walls. The riverside buildings are at high risk of flooding, and so their ground floors are not in residential or commercial use.

== History ==
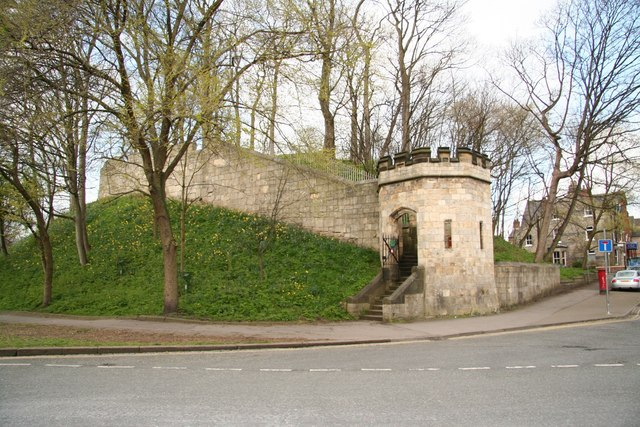
Baile Hill and the city walls

The area was probably occupied in the pre-Roman period, and a few artifacts of the period have been found nearby, outside the present walls. In the Roman era, it was the site of the principal civil built-up area of Eboracum, which later became a colonia. The site had defences and some stone buildings, remains of which have been excavated in the churchyard of the former St Mary Bishophill Senior. George Pace suggested that the church may have been on the site of a Romano-British cathedral, but there is no evidence for this.

Following the Roman withdrawal, the history of the area is obscure until the construction of St Mary Bishophill Junior in the 10th century, a large stone building for the period. Following the Norman Conquest, Baile Hill was built up at the south of the Bishophill area, with one of the city's two castles atop. A bailey with earth ramparts lay to its north west; the castle may also have had its own mill. However, after Clifford's Tower on the other bank of the River Ouse was rebuilt in stone, the castle was allowed to decay, some of its defences being incorporated into the city walls. By the 14th century, the current line of the city walls had been developed, and in the 15th century, the site was handed over to the city corporation and used for sports. Meanwhile, wharves were developed along the riverside, notably Queen's Staith, which opened in 1660, and warehouses were built. Over time, more houses were constructed in the area; the most significant was Buckingham House, home of Lord Fairfax. In 1667, the Friends' Burial Ground was created, and Middleton's Hospital was founded in 1659.

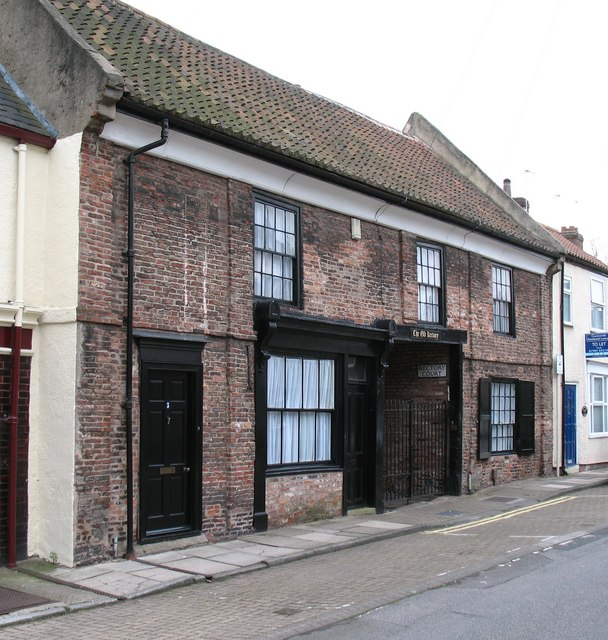
The Old Rectory

A small number of buildings from the late Mediaeval period and the 17th century survive in Bishophill; aside from St Mary Bishophill Junior, and the walls, these include 29 Trinity Lane, Cransfields on St Martin's Lane, Old Rectory on Victor Street. Other important early buildings were demolished in the 20th century. The Old Warehouse on Skeldergate, dating from the 17th century, was demolished in 1970, and the Plumbers' Arms, built about 1575, was rebuilt as the Cock and Bottle in 1964.

The early-18th century was a period of decline for the area; several houses were demolished and replaced with orchards. This changed in 1756, when the City Corporation began designating building plots, the first at the north side of Bishophill Junior. In 1765, the architect John Carr built his own house on Skeldergate, which survived until 1945. 56 Skeldergate was built in the 1770s, probably by Carr, and survives.

A jail was built in the 1800s on what is now Cromwell Road; the Skeldergate Postern in the city wall was demolished to provide better access, but the public outcry led to the start of preservation efforts, and instead of further demolition, a new archway was constructed. Access to the area was further improved by the construction of Victoria Bar gate in the walls in 1838, and the replacement of the Skeldergate ferry with Skeldergate Bridge.

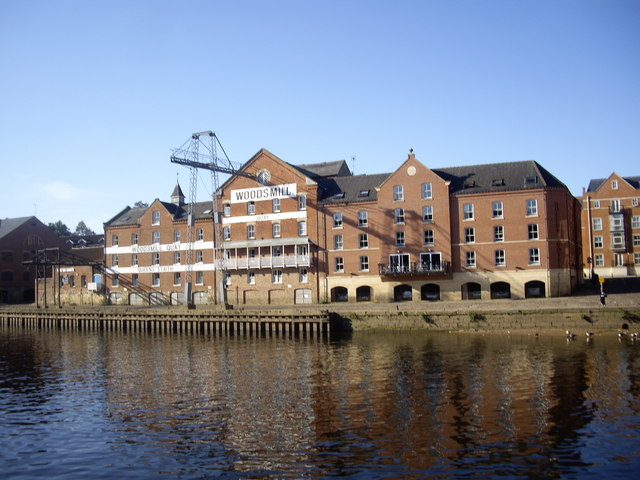
Woods Mill Quay

Development of the area continued through the 19th century, with the second half of the century seeing much of the remaining open area covered with small terrace housing. Notable buildings of the period include the warehouses on Queen's Staith and the Bonding Warehouse on Skeldergate. The large Emperor's Wharf was devoted to the transshipment of timber but, by the end of the century, seagoing ships docked further downstream. Away from the river, the former sawmill at 52 Skeldergate and the Golden Ball pub are key survivals. A community cooperative took over the Golden Ball in 2012, as the owners sought to retire. Many 19th-century churches survive, including the former Victoria Bar Primitive Methodist Chapel, Wesley Chapel on Priory Street, and St Columba's Presbyterian Church.

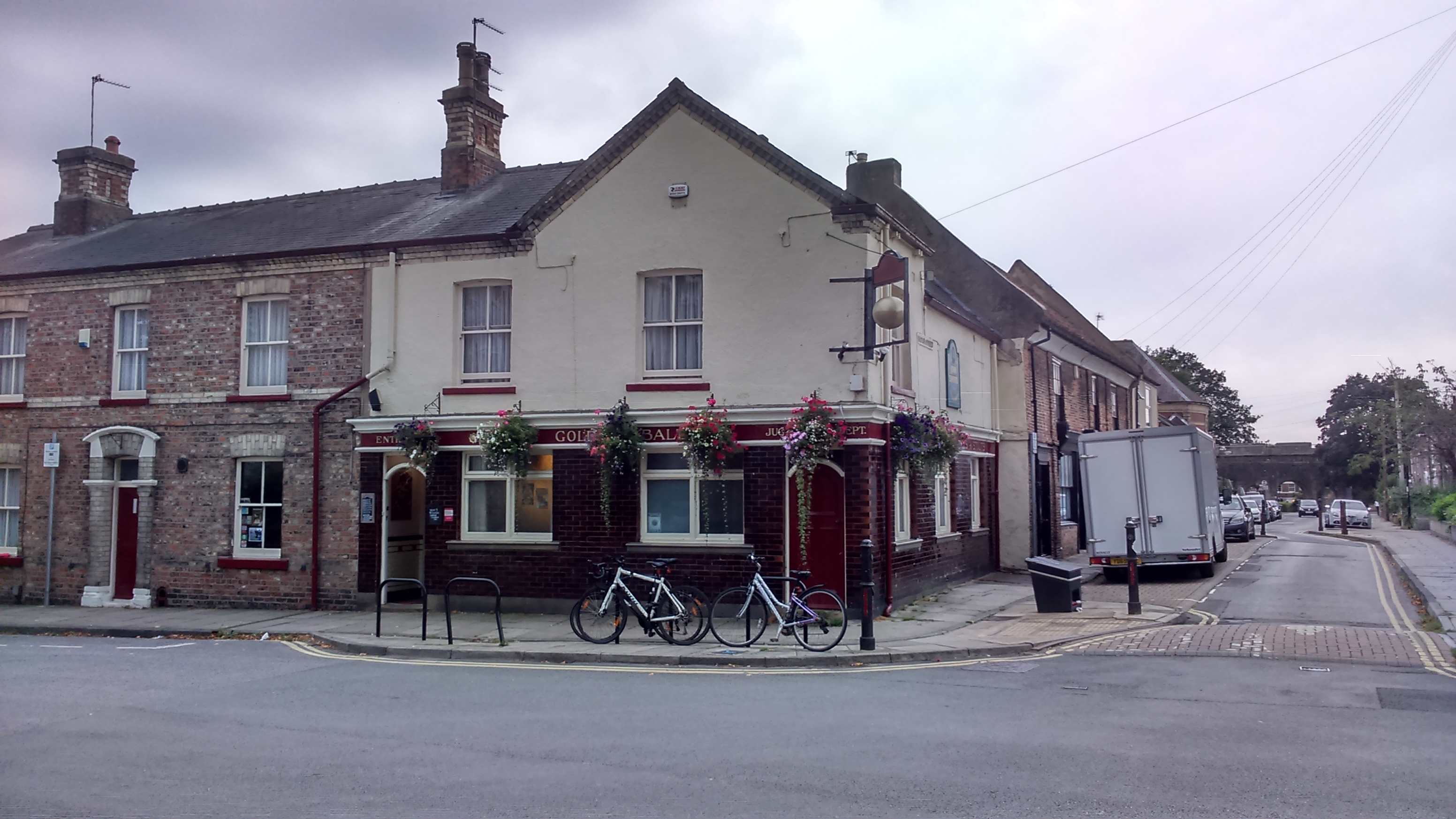
The Golden Ball pub

In the twentieth century, slum clearance took place in the area, many smaller properties being replaced by low-rise flats and maisonettes. Plans to erect a multi-storey car park in the centre of the district were opposed by a newly-formed residents' association and were subsequently abandoned.

== Notable people ==
- Edith Aitken (1861–1940), headmistress

== Sources ==
- Pace, George (1987) [1964]. Bishophill, York – Appraisal and Renewal. York: William Sessions. ISBN 0900657227.
- Webster Appleton, Avril E. (2011). Looking Back at Micklegate, Nunnery Lane and Bishophill: York. York: Reeder Publications. ISBN 9780954346324.
