= Bar billiards =

Cue sport

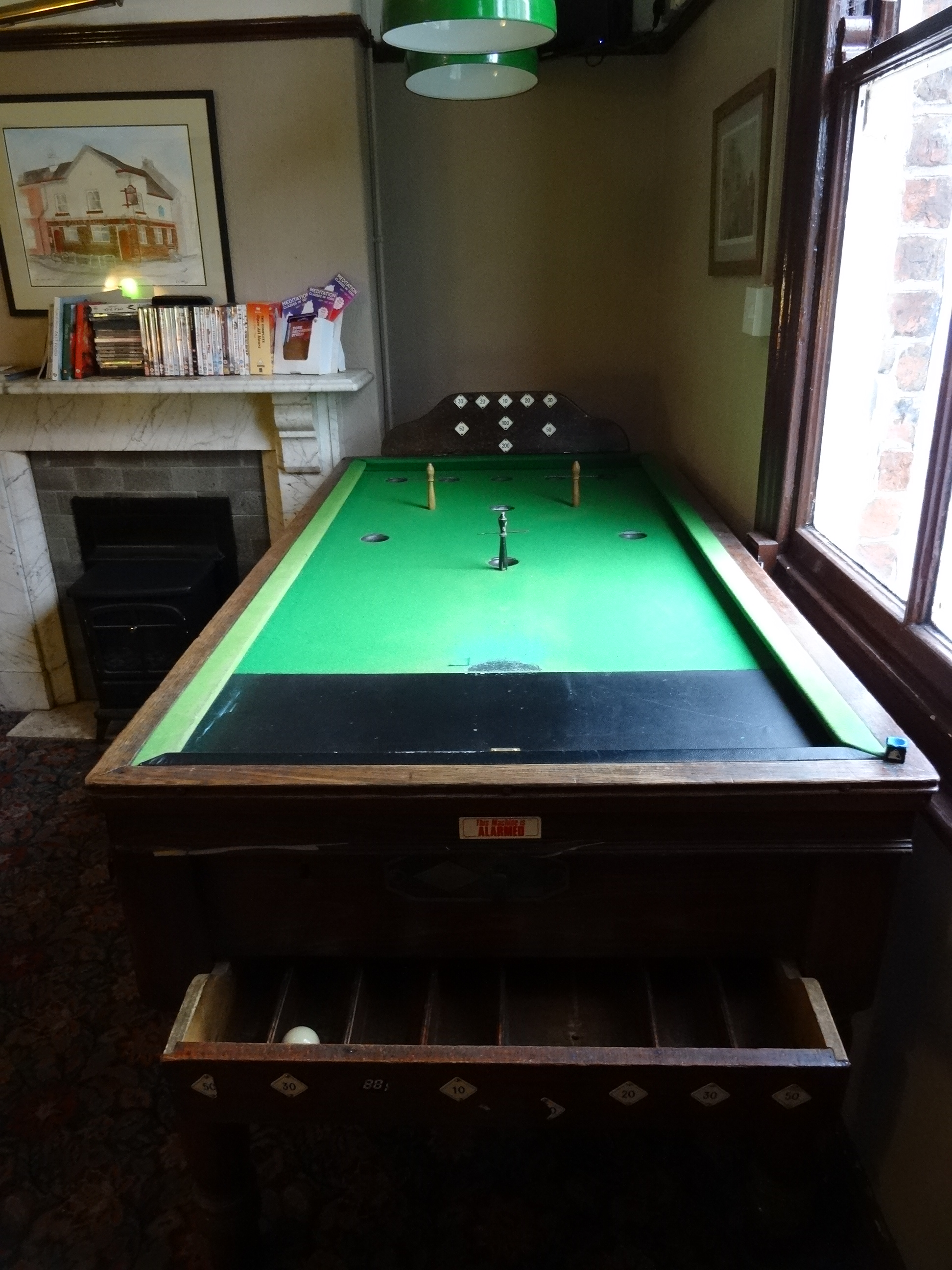
- A Bar billiards table in the Golden Ball Community Pub, York
- Highest governing body: All England Bar Billiards Association
- First played: 1930s

Characteristics
- Contact: No
- Type: Cue sport
- Equipment: Cue, Billiard balls, Skittles

Bar billiards is a form of billiards which involves scoring points by potting balls in holes on the playing surface of the table rather than in pockets. Bar billiards developed from the French/Belgian game billard russe, of Russian origin. The current form started in the UK in the 1930s and now has leagues in twelve counties under the All England Bar Billiards Association, as well as leagues in Guernsey and Jersey where the annual world championships take place.

== History ==
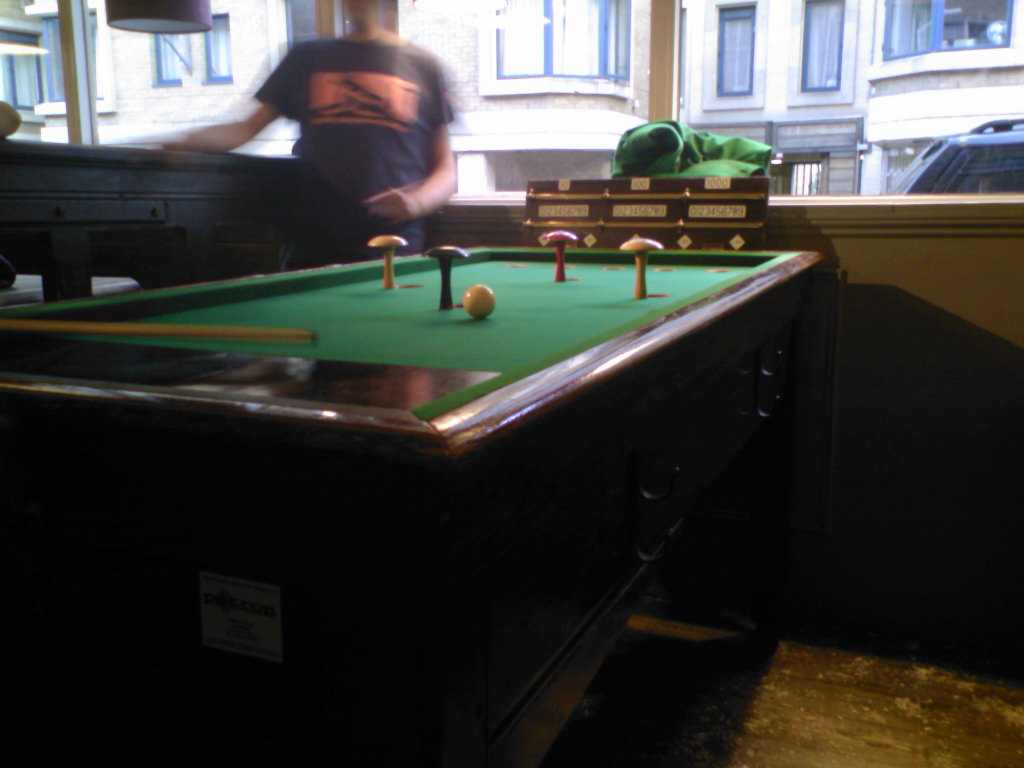
Table with mushroom-style skittles

The game of bar billiards developed originally from the French billard, which due to the expensive tables in the fifteenth century was played only by the French monarchy and the very rich. The game was transformed into billard russe (Russian billiards) during the 16th century for the Russian Tsars and a derivative of Bagatelle played by French royalty.

Bar billiards was first imported into the UK during the early 1930s when David Gill, an Englishman witnessed a game of billard russe taking place in Belgium. He persuaded the Jelkes company of Holloway Road in London to make a similar table. Tables were also made by Sams, Riley, Burroughs & Watts and Clare. It is now a traditional bar game played in leagues in the English counties of Berkshire, Buckinghamshire, Cambridgeshire, Hampshire, Kent, Norfolk, Northamptonshire, Oxfordshire, Suffolk, Surrey, Sussex and Yorkshire, and also the Channel Islands. The game's governing body is the All England Bar Billiards Association. There are also leagues in Guernsey and Jersey. The standard "league" tables have a playing surface approximately 32 inches (81 cm) wide. Sams also made a narrower version with a 28-inch (71 cm) width playing surface.

Earliest versions of the game used wooden mushrooms instead of pegs which have a thin curved stalk and a flattish rounded cap. These were normally placed in front of the 50 and 200 holes often with a fourth mushroom in front of the 100 hole. This version was often referred to as Russian billiards, probably named after the very similar French and Belgian game billard russe which has a longer history, neither are to be confused with the common billiards game in Russia. There are a couple of leagues that still play this version in East Anglia in the Norwich and Sudbury areas.

== Gameplay ==
- Bar billiards is played on a table with no side or corner pockets, but with nine holes in the playing surface which are assigned various point values ranging from 10 to 200.
- There are eight balls in all, seven white and one red.
- Potting the red ball in any hole scores double the points on that hole.
- On the playfield are normally placed three pegs/mushrooms/skittles; There are two white pegs/skittles, one either side of the 100 hole, with one black peg/skittle in front of the 200 hole.
- If a white peg is knocked over then it is a foul shot resulting in the player's break being ended and all score acquired during that break is discarded.
- Knocking down the black peg ends that player's break and overall score is zeroed.
- In the case that a white and a black peg are both knocked over, then the first peg to be knocked over is counted.
- All shots are played from the front end of the table so access to all sides is not required which is ideal in a small bar or pub.
- At the start of the game or when there are no balls remaining on the table, a white ball is placed on the spot labelled D on the table and the red ball is placed on the spot in front of that.

This break shot may be done a maximum of three times; if both balls are potted before, one ball must remain on the table known as the 1-up, failing to leave this one ball up results in a foul and loss of break. The next shot attempted is the 'split shot' where the object ball is usually potted in the 50 hole and the cue ball is potted in the 100 hole. There are variants to this; sometimes it is necessary to pot the balls into the 50 and 10 holes for example. If successful the break shot, can be used again and so on.

Players take alternate turns or breaks at the table, playing from where their opponent has left off. If the player fails to pot a ball then the break has ended and the second player takes their break by placing another ball on the first spot. If all balls are in play, then the nearest ball to the D is removed and put on the spot. If a player fails to hit a ball, then the break ends and all points earned in that break are lost.

The play is time-limited. A coin will usually give around 17 minutes of play, dependent on region. After this time a bar drops inside the table stopping any potted balls from returning, leading to a steady decrease in the number of balls in play. The last ball can only be potted into either the 100 or 200 hole having been played off either side cushion.

The Bar Billiards world championship takes place each November on the island of Jersey.

== World Championship results history ==
The Bar Billiards World Championship (called the British Isles Open up to 1999) is held every year in Jersey.

Year	Winner	from	Runner-up	from	Reference
1981	Harry Siddall	Jersey	Derek Payne	Oxfordshire	
1982	Graham Bisson	Jersey	Clarrie Querrie	Jersey	
1983	Tim Ringsdore	Jersey	Micky Daw	Jersey	
1984	Peter Noel	Jersey	Don Cadec	Jersey	
1985	Bernie McCluskey	Berkshire	Peter Webb	Guernsey	
1986	Dave Harris	Berkshire	Peter Noel	Jersey	
1987	Wayne Poingdestre	Jersey	Kevin Tunstall	Oxfordshire	
1988	Alan Le Blond	Jersey	Micky Daw	Jersey	
1989	Trevor Gallienne	Guernsey	Bob Taylor	Kent	
1990	Steve Ahier	Jersey	Terry Race	Sussex	
1991	Steve Ahier	Jersey	Simon Tinto	Surrey	
1992	Dennis Helleur	Jersey	Harry Barbet	Jersey	
1993	Kevin Tunstall	Oxfordshire	Graham Bisson	Jersey	
1994	Kevin Tunstall	Oxfordshire	Tony Walsh	Berkshire	
1995	Tony Walsh	Berkshire	Mark Brewster	Kent	
1996	Terry Oakley	Surrey	Don Cadec	Jersey	
1997	Jim Millward	Sussex	Steve Ahier	Jersey	
1998	Keith Sheard	Oxfordshire	Nick Barnett	Jersey	
1999	Peter Noel	Jersey	Terry Race	Sussex	
2000	Bernie McCluskey	Berkshire	Bob King	Jersey	
2001	Jim Millward	Sussex	Kevin Tunstall	Oxfordshire	
2002	Terry Race	Sussex	Nigel Ryall	Jersey	
2003	Jim Millward	Sussex	Terry Race	Sussex	
2004	Terry Race	Sussex	Nigel Ryall	Jersey	
2005	Graeme Le Monnier	Jersey	Harry Barbet	Jersey	
2006	Kevin Tunstall	Oxfordshire	Jim Millward	Sussex	
2007	Trevor Gallienne	Guernsey	Jim Millward	Sussex	
2008	Trevor Gallienne	Guernsey	Kevin Tunstall	Sussex	
2009	Phil Collins	Oxfordshire	Paul Sainsbury	Berkshire	
2010	Jim Millward	Sussex	Graham Bisson	Jersey	
2011	Kevin Tunstall	Sussex	Steven Sheard	Oxfordshire	
2012	Kevin Tunstall	Sussex	Paul Sainsbury	Berkshire	
2013	Mark Trafford	Oxfordshire	Nigel Senior	Sussex	
2014	David Ingram	Sussex	Kevin Tunstall	Sussex	
2015	Paul Sainsbury	Berkshire	James Jeanne	Jersey	
2016	Matthew Jones	Buckinghamshire	Mark Brewster	Kent	
2017	Mark Trafford	Oxfordshire	Kevin Tunstall	Sussex	
2018	Paul Sainsbury	Kent	Phil Osbourne	Sussex	
2019	Kevin Tunstall	West Sussex	Martin Cole	West Sussex	
2020	Cancelled due to the COVID-19 pandemic				
2021	Mark Trafford	Oxfordshire	Trevor Gallienne	Guernsey	
2022	Kevin Tunstall	West Sussex	Trevor Gallienne	Guernsey	
2023	Matthew Jones	Buckinghamshire	Trevor Gallienne	Guernsey	
2024	Trevor Gallienne	Guernsey	Michael Wilson	Surrey	
2025	Matthew Jones	Buckinghamshire	Curt Driver	Kent	
2026	Martin Cole	West Sussex	Paul Sainsbury	Kent	

== Multi-time world champions ==
- Kevin Tunstall: 7
- Jim Millward: 4
- Trevor Gallienne: 4
- Matthew Jones: 3
- Mark Trafford: 3
- Peter Noel: 2
- Steve Ahier: 2
- Bernie McCluskey: 2
- Terry Race: 2
- Paul Sainsbury: 2
