= 5 Bridge Street =

Listed former pub in York, England

- The building in 2025
- Interactive map of the 5 Bridge Street area
- Former names: Ye Olde No. 5

General information
- Status: Converted to restaurant use
- Type: Shop (former); originally public house
- Location: Bridge Street, York, England
- Coordinates: 53.9572°N 1.0847°W
- Year built: 1840–1850; 176 years ago
- Renovated: Late 20th century (converted)
- Closed: c. 1966 (as a pub)

Design and construction
- Designations

Listed Building – Grade II
- Official name: 5 Bridge Street
- Designated: 24 June 1983
- Reference no.: 1259346

5 Bridge Street is a Grade II listed former public house in York, England. Built between 1840 and 1850, it later ceased trading as Ye Olde No. 5 and was converted to commercial use by the late 20th century. It has housed an Italian restaurant since 2018.

== History ==
The building on Bridge Street was constructed between 1840 and 1850 as a public house, with later alterations made to the structure. Anecdotal accounts suggest that the premises were historically known as Ye Olde No. 5, and that its liquor licence was surrendered in August 1966. In 1968 the site was included within the newly established Central Historic Core conservation area, and on 24 June 1983, the building was designated a Grade II listed structure. It stands between Nos. 3–4 and Nos. 6–7, all of which are also Grade II listed, and forms part of a terrace of nine listed buildings on Bridge Street between Queen's Staith and Skeldergate, close to the Grade II-listed Ouse Bridge.

City of York Council records indicate that the building had shifted from use as a pub to commercial shop premises by the later 20th century, with the change of use noted by 1983. The premises have been in use as an Italian restaurant since 2018.

== Architecture ==
The building is painted brick with simple decorative bands at the top and a hipped pantile roof. The front has three storeys and two bays, with a double shopfront featuring plain pilasters and a cornice. The upper floors have sash windows, larger on the first floor and smaller on the second, each with painted sills and shallow brick heads. A flat band, cornice and parapet run along the top of the façade. On the right‑hand side are rainwater fittings with a rectangular hopper and fleur‑de‑lys‑patterned brackets.

== See also ==
- Listed buildings in York (within the city walls, southern part)
