= St Mary Bishophill Junior, York =

Grade I listed church in York, England

St Mary, Bishophill Junior
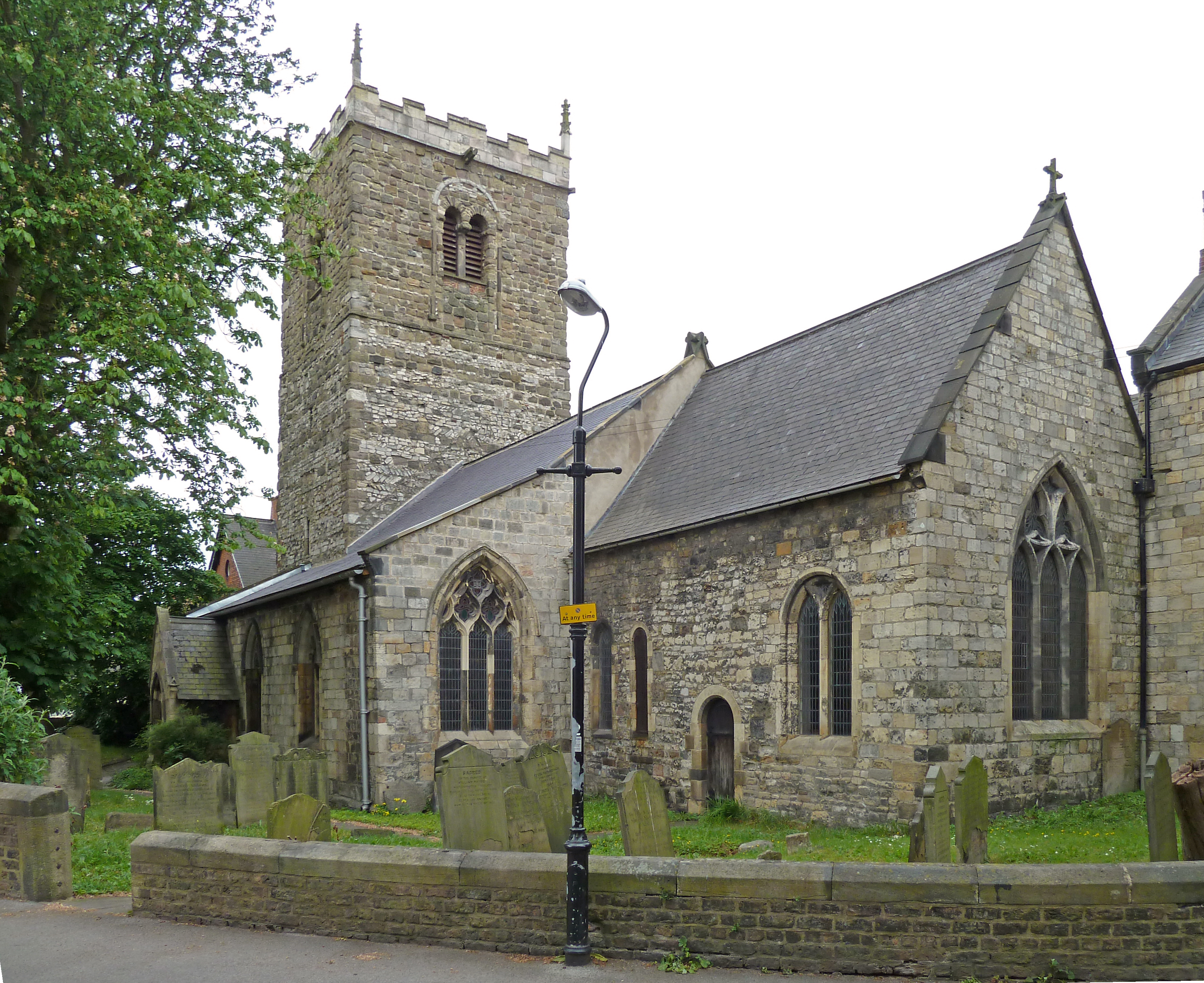
- St Mary, Bishophill Junior, York
- St Mary, Bishophill Junior
- 53°57′21.07″N 1°5′14.22″W
- OS grid reference: SE 59996 51474
- Location: Bishophill, York
- Country: England
- Denomination: Church of England
- Churchmanship: Anglo-Catholic
- Website: stmary-bishophill.co.uk

History
- Dedication: St Mary the Virgin

Architecture
- Heritage designation: Grade I listed

Administration
- Province: Province of York
- Diocese: Diocese of York
- Archdeaconry: York
- Deanery: York
- Parish: St Mary Bishophill Junior, York

Clergy
- Bishop: The Rt Revd Stephen Race SSC (AEO)

St Mary Bishophill Junior is a Grade I listed parish church in the Church of England, in the Bishophill area of York.

== History ==
The church dates from the 10th century with the oldest part being the tower, which reuses some Roman stones. It was heightened in the 11th century, probably before the Norman Conquest, and the battlements were added around 1411. The 11th-century nave has a 12th-century north arcade and north aisle. The chancel dates from the 13th century. The font and bells are also medieval.

The church was restored between 1860 and 1861 by J. B. and W. Atkinson, described by the York Civic Trust as "poorly conceived". The old pews were removed, the floor was raised by 10 inches (250 mm) and concreted. The brick porch was removed, and the wooden window taken out. A stone porch was erected and new windows added. The flat ceilings were removed to reveal the open timber roof. The chancel was renovated by Ewan Christian, architect of the commissioners.

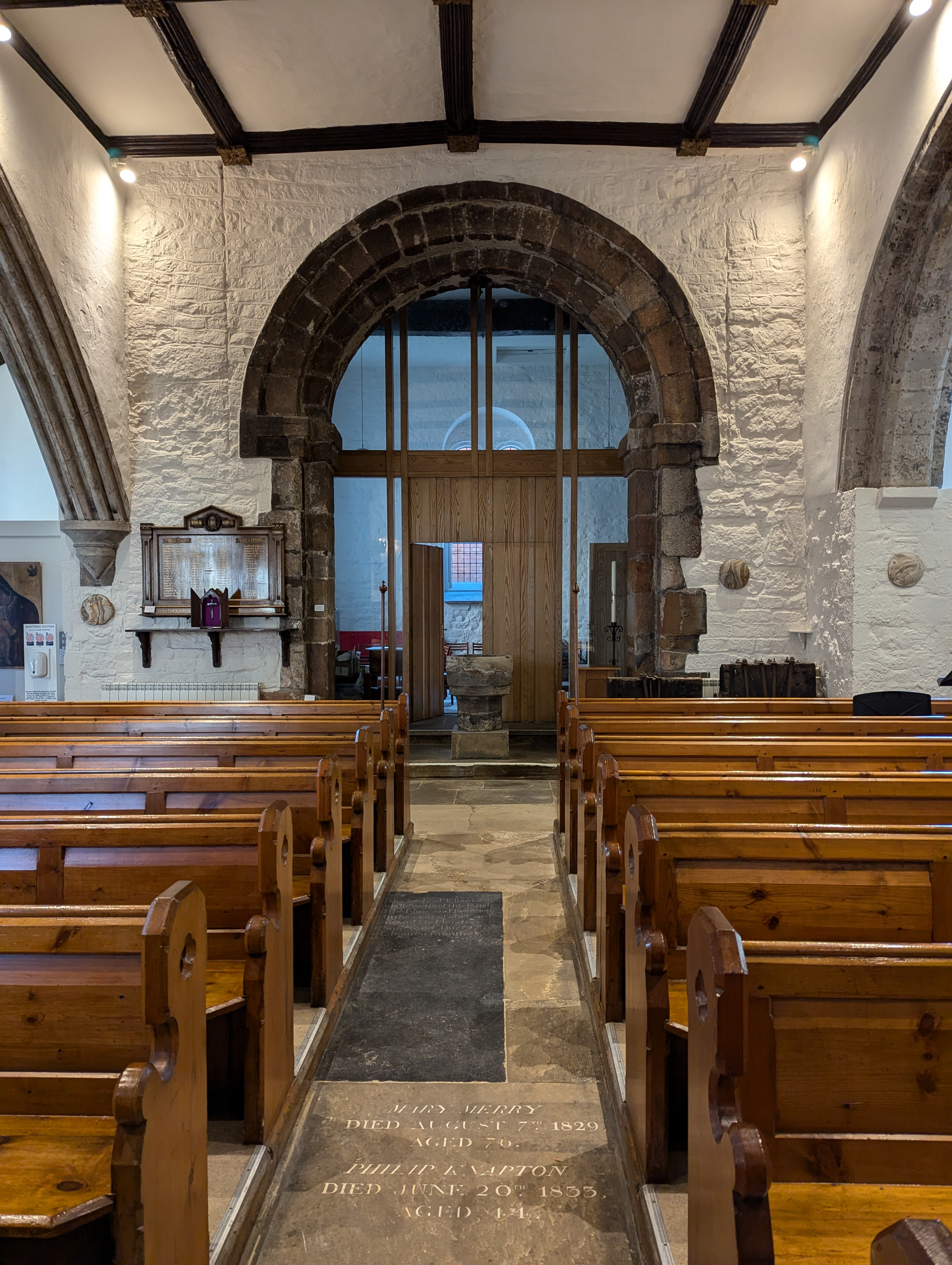
Interior, showing the tower arch

The pulpit and reredos were added by Temple Lushington Moore in 1889.

The tower was restored in 1980.

== Parish status ==
The church is in a joint parish with All Saints' Church, North Street, York.

== Organ ==
The church contained an organ before 1860. During the 1860 restoration, this was turned into a Swell, and a new Great manual of seven stops was added.

In 1921, F. D. Ward of Middlesbrough undertook some repairs and renovation. After 1930, the 1870 organ by Forster and Andrews from the Church of St Mary Bishophill Senior was installed here.

The current pipe organ dates from 1864 and was originally made by William Denman for the Spiritualist Church on Spen Lane in York. Later it moved to Freemasons' Hall and in 1986 Principal Pipe Organs installed it here. A specification of the organ can be found on the National Pipe Organ Register.

== See also ==
- Grade I listed buildings in the City of York
- Listed buildings in York (within the city walls, southern part)
