= Wesley Chapel, Priory Street =

Listed chapel in York, England

Wesley Chapel
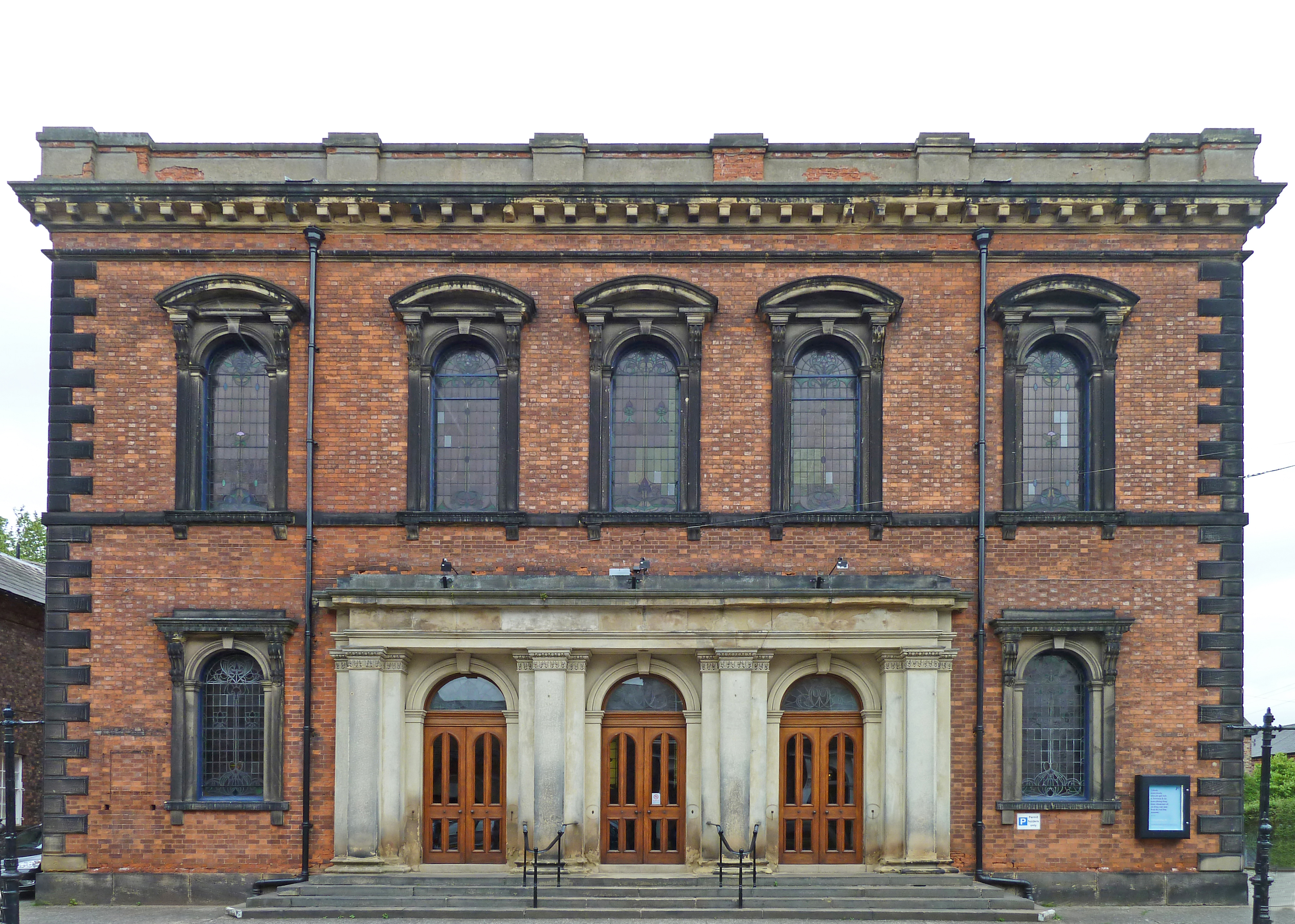
- The church in 2011

General information
- Architectural style: Classical
- Location: Priory Street, Bishophill, York, England
- Coordinates: 53°57′22.7″N 1°5′20″W
- Completed: 1856
- Renovated: Late 19th century (lecture hall); 1907 and 1910 (extended); 1914 (porch)

Technical details
- Floor count: 2

Design and construction
- Architect: James Simpson
- Designations

Listed Building – Grade II*
- Official name: Assembly of God Pentecostal Church and building attached at rear
- Designated: 25 June 1982
- Reference no.: 1256884

The Wesley Chapel is a Grade II* listed building on Priory Street in the Bishophill area of York, England.

The church was built in 1856, on the newly-developed Priory Street, the area having formerly been part of the grounds of the Holy Trinity Priory. On opening, it was able to accommodate 1,500 worshippers, and it was extended the following year, with the addition of a school, a Sunday school, and a house for a preacher. The design was by James Simpson, and it cost £10,936.

The auditorium

The chapel is built of brick, in a classical style, with a stone pediment, and stone around the windows and doors. The front is of five bays, and two storeys. It has three main entrance doors, and two arched windows on the ground floor, and three arched windows above. The left and right facades are of seven bays, but designed in a similar manner. Inside, the foyer is fully panelled, with a glazed screen separating it from the auditorium. The screen incorporates a memorial panel to congregation members killed in World War I. Doors in the side of the screen lead to staircases up to an oval gallery. This is above the auditorium, which retains its original pews, and have stained glass in every window except one, much in an Art Nouveau style.

Later in the 19th century, a lecture hall was added at the rear of the building, its design possibly by G. T. Andrews. In 1892, a new organ, built by James Binns, was installed, and the buildings were extended in 1907 and 1910. In 1914, a new porch was added. During World War II, the school was taken over by the council, as the Manor Secondary Modern School, and that building is now the separate Priory Centre.

The chapel was originally part of the York Circuit of the Wesleyan Methodist Church. In 1867, it became the head of the new York Wesley Circuit, covering the city west of the River Ouse. In 1932, the Wesleyan Methodists became part of the new Methodist Church of Great Britain, and the chapel headed the revised Wesley Circuit. The chapel closed in 1982, with its congregation transferring to the Central Methodist Church. It was purchased by a congregation linked to the Assemblies of God, and was renamed as the Assembly of God Church, then in 1993 it was renamed as the Rock Church. At this point, it was still part of the Assemblies of God, but aimed to offer a more contemporary expression of worship, with rock music and a dance academy. By 2006, it claimed an average weekly attendance of 250 adults. In 2018, it was again renamed, as QChurch.

== See also ==
- Grade II* listed buildings in the City of York
- Listed buildings in York (within the city walls, southern part)
