= Central Methodist Church, York =

Listed church in York, England

Central Methodist Church
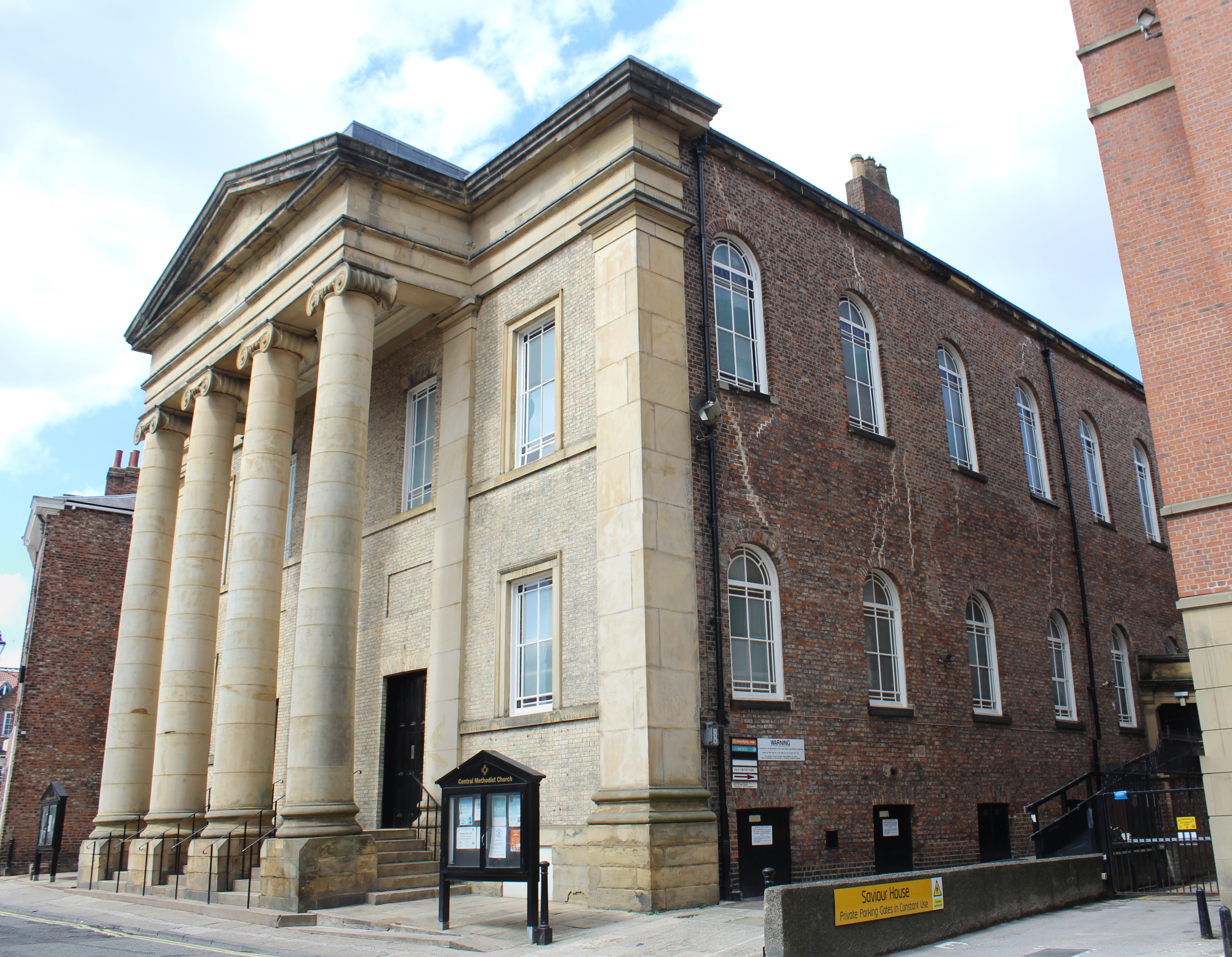
- The church in 2018
- Central Methodist Church
- 53.95954°N 1.07880°W
- OS grid reference: SE 60540 51896
- Address: St Saviourgate, York
- Country: England
- Denomination: Methodist
- Website: centralmethodistyork.org.uk

Architecture
- Heritage designation: Grade II* listed
- Architect: James Simpson
- Style: Classical
- Completed: 1840

Specifications
- Capacity: 1,500

The Central Methodist Church is a Grade II* listed building in the city centre of York, England.

The church lies on St Saviourgate. It was constructed in 1840, as the Centenary Chapel, marking the 100th anniversary of the founding of the first Methodist societies.

The building was designed by James Simpson in a classical style, with an Ionic portico. It consists of a basement and two storeys above. To its rear, he built vestries, classrooms, band rooms, and a house for a caretaker. In 1861, the buildings to the rear were extended to provide more classroom space. They burned down in 1863, and though they were rebuilt, they again burned down, and were again replaced in 1872. The chapel was extended in 1881 and 1885, the schoolrooms were extended in 1895, and two new vestries were added in 1909.

In 1887, the chapel became the head of a circuit. In 1908 and 1926, it hosted meetings of the Wesleyan Methodist Conference. In 1982, its congregation merged with that of the Wesley Chapel, Priory Street, and it was then renamed as the "Central Methodist Church".

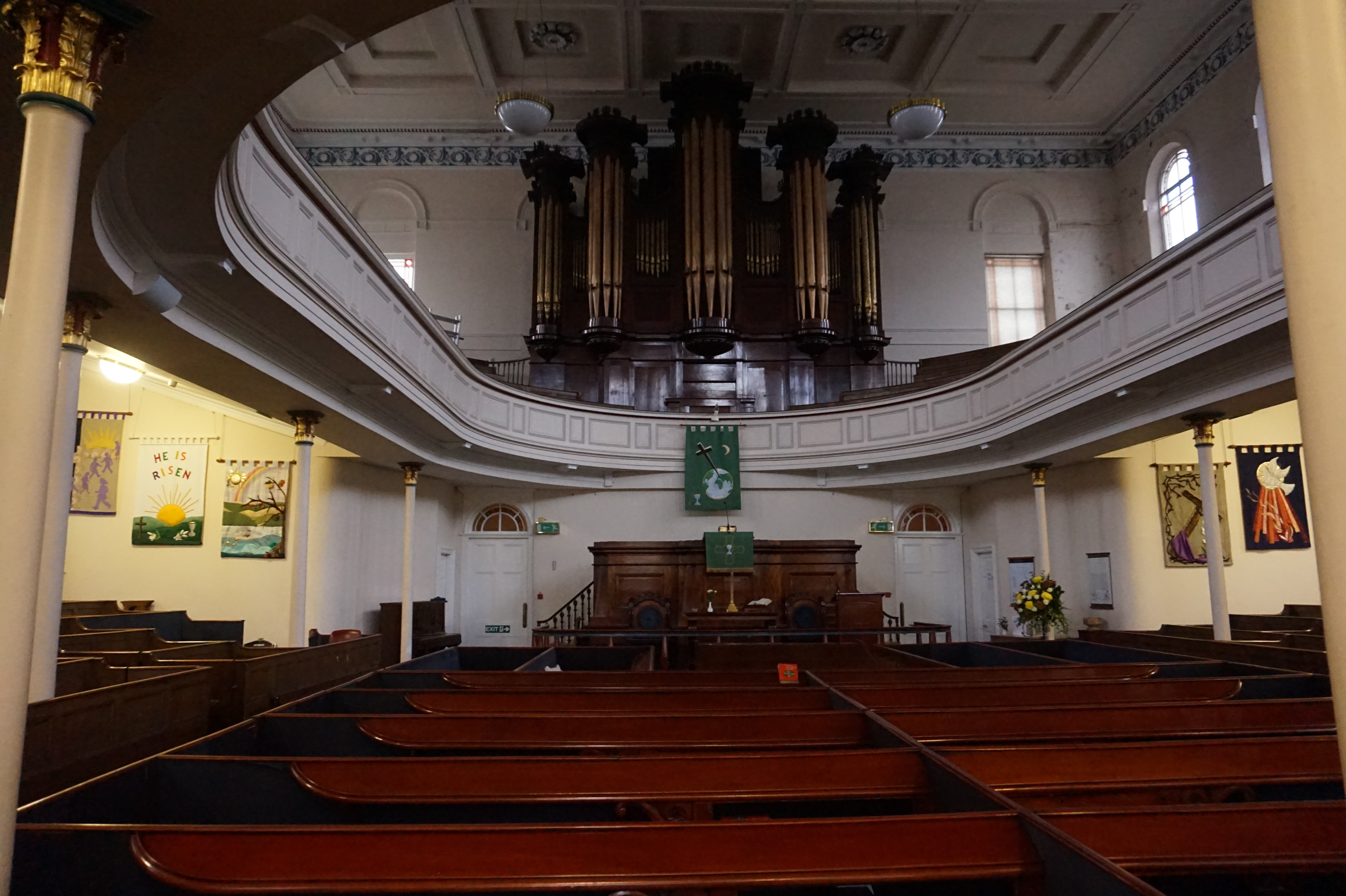
Interior of the church

The chapel can seat 1,500 worshippers in a horseshoe formation, some on oval gallery above. On the ground floor, there are original numbered box pews. The three-manual organ with 2,500 pipes was installed by John Brown in 1841 and rebuilt in 1931. Notable monuments include a sarcophagus dedicated to Joseph Agar, and a tabernacle dedicated to the Reverend David Hill, a local missionary to China.

The church hosts regular services, although as of 2016 its congregation averaged only 45. It also holds Carecent breakfasts for homeless and disadvantaged people. The building provides space for some charities and voluntary groups in first floor offices. In 2016, its minister announced plans to add a new reception space, improve access for disabled people, and start offering the space as a community centre during the week.

In October 2021, the church was one of 142 sites across England to receive part of a £35-million injection into the government's Culture Recovery Fund.

== See also ==
- Grade II* listed buildings in the City of York
- Listed buildings in York (within the city walls, southern part)
