= Skeldergate House Hotel =

Listed building in York, England

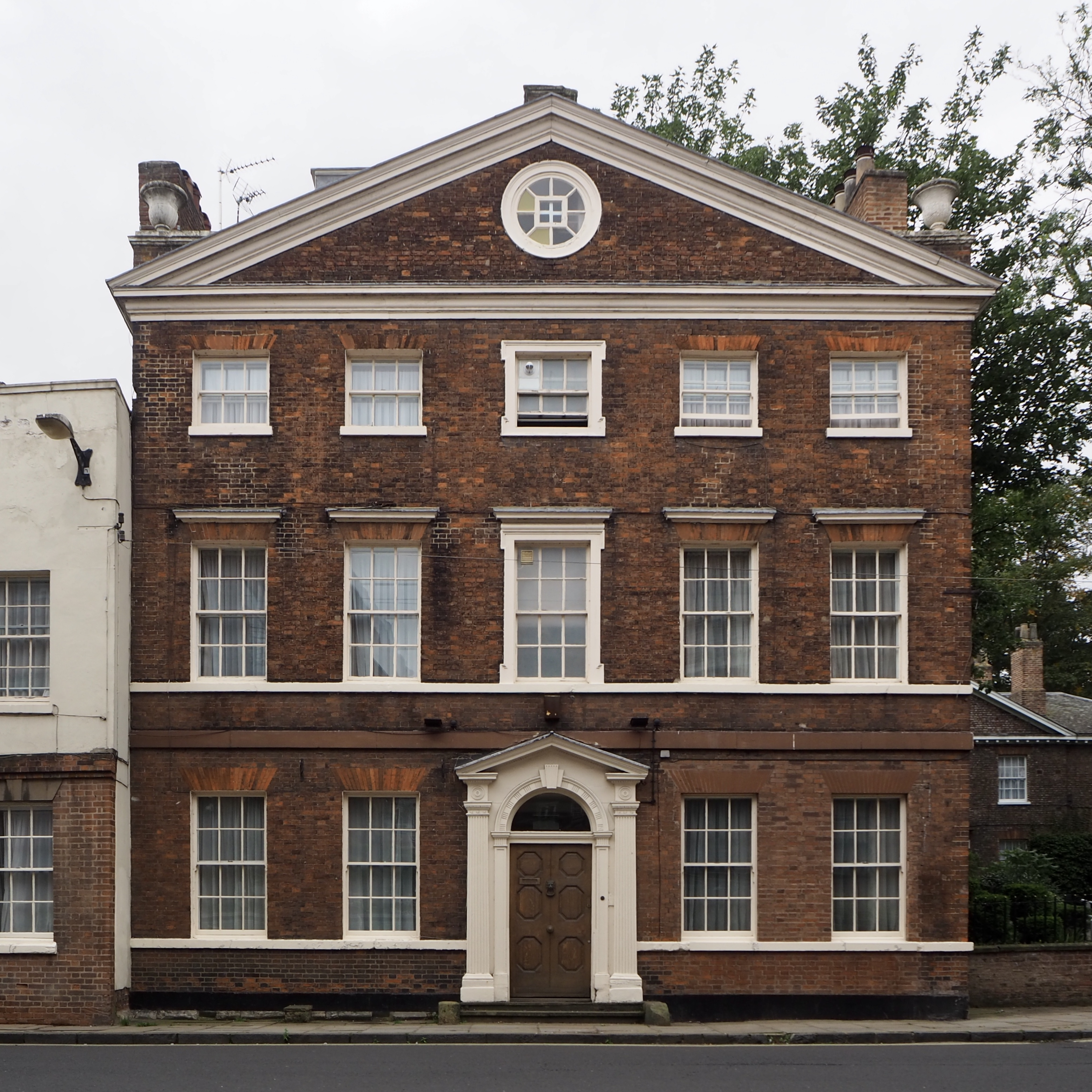
- The hotel in 2018

General information
- Address: Bishophill, York, England
- Coordinates: 53°57′19″N 1°05′01″W
- Completed: c. 1777–8
- Renovated: c. 1925 (altered and part demolished) c. 1998 (restored)

Technical details
- Floor count: 2 + attic

Design and construction
- Architect(s): John Carr
- Designations

Listed Building – Grade II*
- Official name: Skeldergate House Hotel
- Designated: 14 June 1954
- Reference no.: 1256636

Skeldergate House Hotel is a Grade II* listed building in the Bishophill area of central York, in England.

An earlier house at 56 Skeldergate was purchased by Ralph Dodsworth in 1769. In 1777, he became Sheriff of York, and it is believed that this inspired him to commission John Carr to design him a new house, large enough to entertain groups. Dodsworth died in 1796, and the house was let to the merchant Thomas Smith, who purchased it in 1807, then sold it to William Cooper in 1825, for £900. His son later brought it into business use. In 1925, a carriageway was constructed through the building, to provide access to the rear yard, leading to the demolition of some rooms and a rear service wing.

In the mid-20th century, the house was owned by Hans Hess, director of York Art Gallery. In the property, he hosted guests including Charlie Chaplin, Benjamin Britten and Cleo Laine. It later became a hotel, more recently, part of Middletons Hotel. In 1998/1999, the carriageway was filled in, restoring the building to its original appearance. As part of the restoration, it became the hotel's conference suite, and more recently has been converted into nine bedrooms and a lounge.

The three-storey building is built of brick. Most of the windows in the main front are original, as is the door and doorcase. Inside, most of the original fittings of the left-hand ground floor room survive, along with a late 19th-century fireplace. The entrance hall also has original plasterwork, and some survives in the stair hall and first-floor landing. The staircase has been completely rebuilt, using some original furnishings.

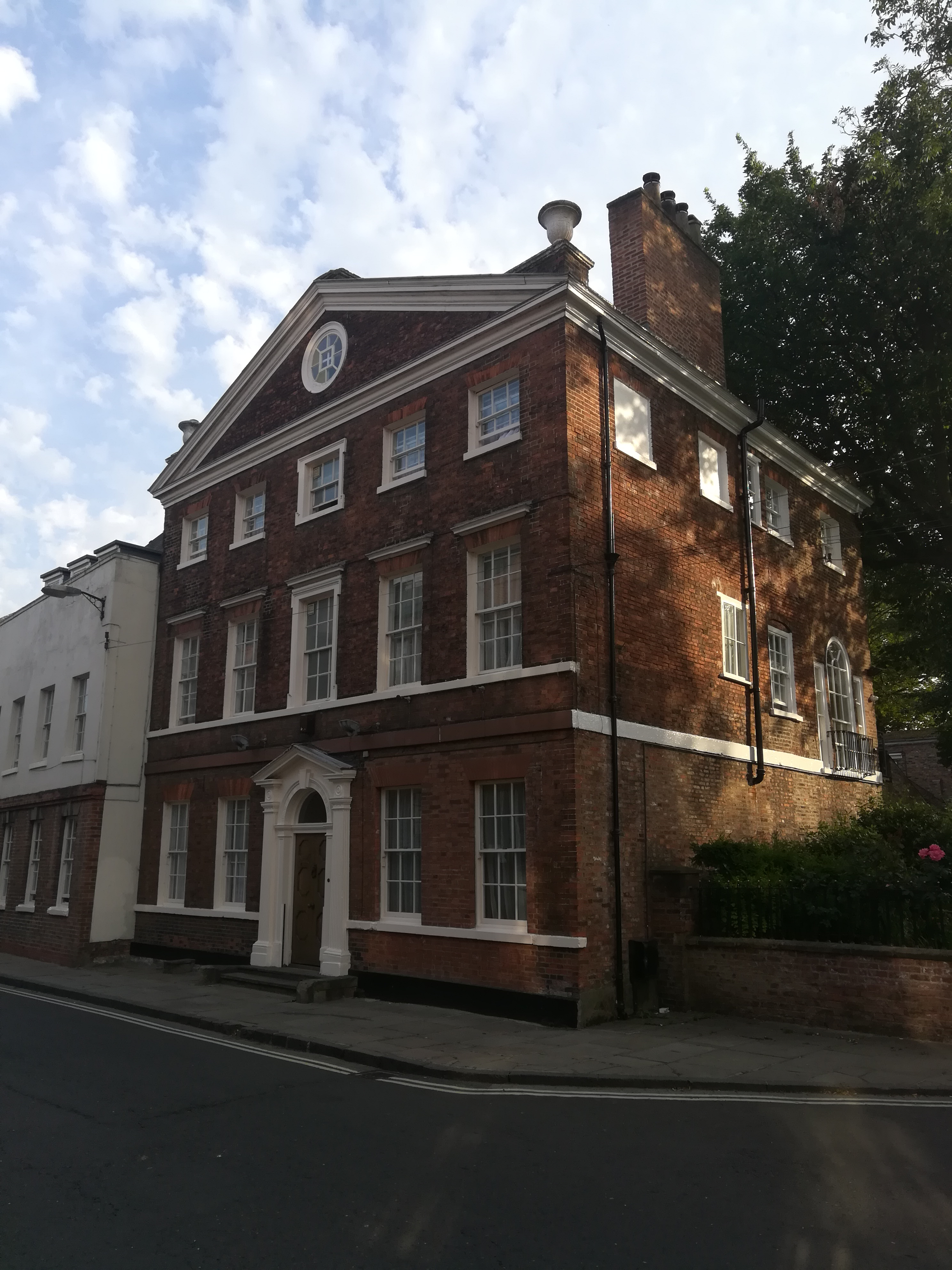
View of the hotel from the north west

== See also ==
- Grade II* listed buildings in the City of York
