= Peter Atkinson (architect, baptised 1780) =

English architect (1780–1843)

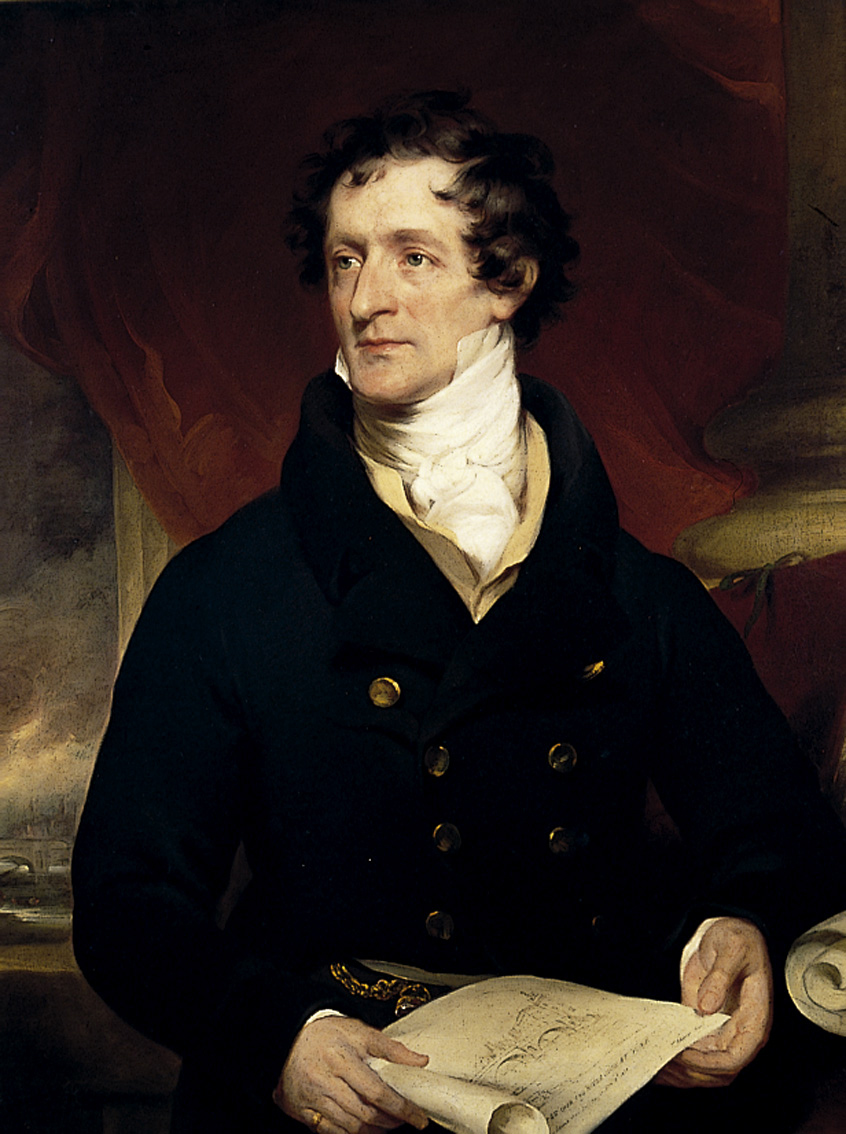
- Baptised: 1780
- Died: 13 January 1843; Calcutta, India
- Occupation: Architect
- Known for: Designing the new Ouse Bridge in York

Peter Atkinson (bapt.1780 – 13 January 1843) was an English architect.

== Biography ==
Atkinson was educated in his profession by his father, Peter Atkinson (1735–1805). In 1801, he became his father's partner, and after his father died, he took over the business. Matthew Phillips (c. 1781–1825) became his partner from 1805 until 1819. A former pupil, Richard Hey Sharp, (1793–1853) succeeded Phillips until 1827, after which Atkinson's sons, John Bownas and William Atkinson assisted their father.

For many years Atkinson had been a steward and surveyor to the corporation of York. He erected many churches in the service of the church commissioners. During the last years of his life he resided abroad - he died in Calcutta on 13 January 1843.

=== Works ===
Among Atkinson's surviving works are:

- Rectory at Middleton on the Wolds, Yorkshire, c. 1810
- Council Chamber at York Guildhall 1810–1811.
- The new Ouse Bridge over the River Ouse, begun in 1810, finished in 1820.
- The new Foss Bridge, which joins the streets of Fossgate and Walmgate over the River Foss in the city of York, 1811–1812.
- Alterations to 33–37 Micklegate, 1812
- Middleton's Hospital, 1829
- Fishergate House, 1837, for Thomas Laycock, J.P. and his wife Elizabeth (not to be confused with the doctor Thomas Laycock, who lived in York at the same time
