= Holy Redeemer Church, York =

Grade II listed church in York, England

Holy Redeemer Church
- The church in 2023
- Holy Redeemer Church
- 53.966278°N 1.124481°W
- OS grid reference: SE 57531 52580
- Location: Boroughbridge Road, York
- Country: England
- Denomination: Church of England
- Website: holyredeemeryork.com

History
- Status: Active
- Dedication: Holy Redeemer
- Consecrated: 1965

Architecture
- Heritage designation: Grade II listed
- Architect: George Pace
- Style: Modern
- Groundbreaking: 1959

Specifications
- Materials: Brick

Administration
- Province: York
- Diocese: York
- Archdeaconry: York
- Deanery: York

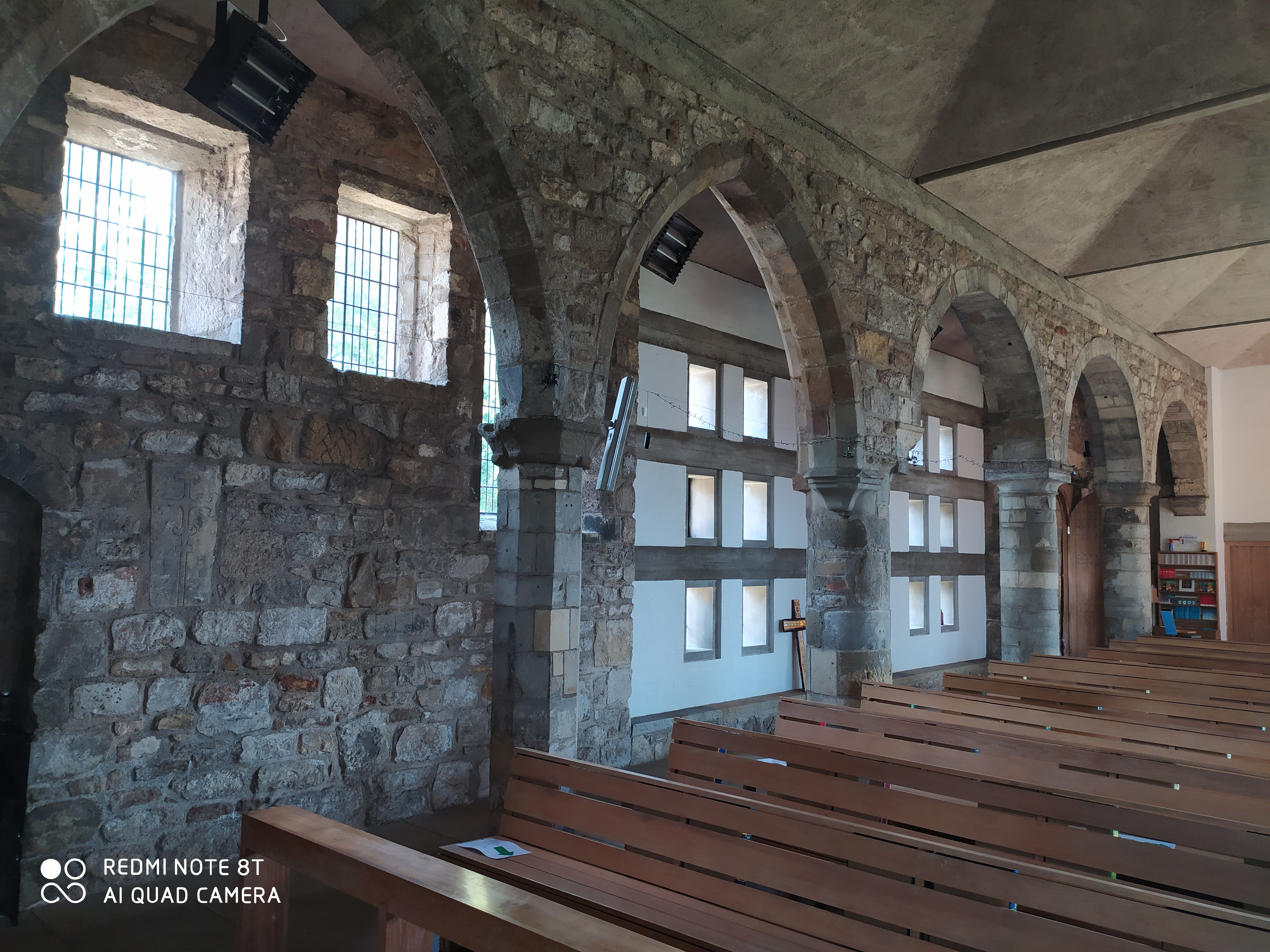
The south arcade, originally from St Mary, Bishophill Senior

The Holy Redeemer Church lies on Boroughbridge Road, in the Acomb area of York, in England.

The first church here was a simple brick building, completed in 1938. This is now used as the church hall, linked to the new church, behind. The new church was constructed between 1959 and 1965, to a design by George Pace.

The church reuses parts of the demolished church of St Mary, Bishophill Senior. The south wall is constructed from stone from the building and includes medieval windows, in a different arrangement to the original building. The remaining walls are brick, with the south wall including a 19th-century Gothic window. The clock tower is also of brick, and sits above a small chapel intended for weekday services.

The church is entered through a late-12th-century doorway. Inside, the church has a wide nave and two narrow aisles. The south arcade is from St Mary, partly dating from about 1200, and partly from the late 13th century. Above the altar is an iron cross, incorporating an Anglo-Saxon carved stone. Other Saxon carved stones, mostly cross fragments, are incorporated in the pulpit and walls. The York Civic Trust claimed that these were "all the interesting parts" of St Mary.

Nikolaus Pevsner described the building as "probably the best post-war building in the city". It was Grade II listed in 1998.

== See also ==
- Listed buildings in York (outside the city walls, southern part)
- Listed buildings in York (Acomb Ward)
