= Lady Anne House =

Listed building in York, England

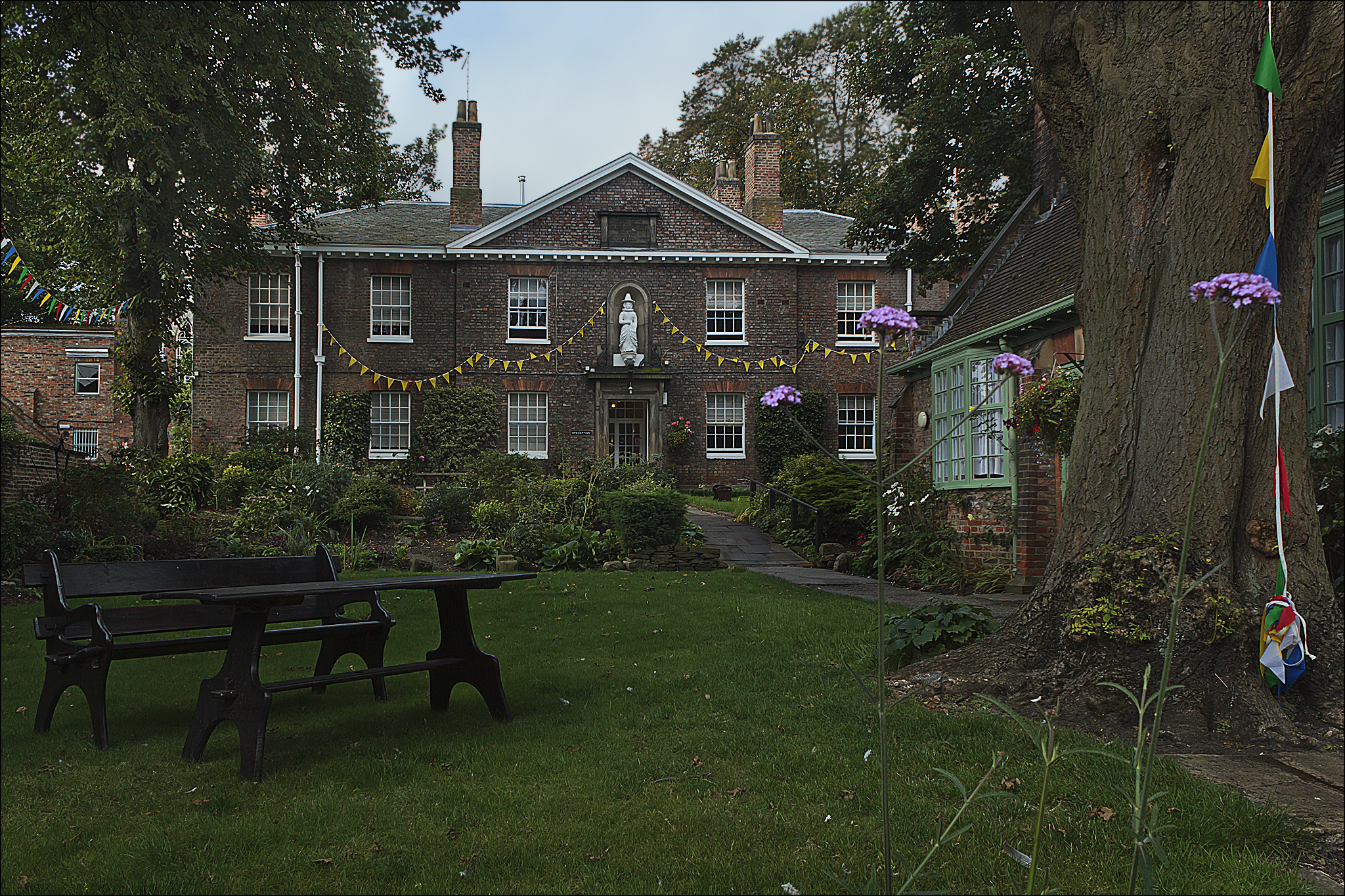
- The hotel in 2014
- Interactive map of the Lady Anne House area

General information
- Location: Skeldergate, York, England
- Coordinates: 53°57′19″N 1°05′03″W
- Completed: 1829
- Renovated: 1939 (modernised); 1973 (renovated and altered)

Technical details
- Floor count: 2

Design and construction
- Architect: Peter Atkinson
- Designations

Listed Building – Grade II*
- Official name: Lady Anne Middletons Hotel and attached garden walls
- Designated: 14 June 1954
- Reference no.: 1256639

Website
- middletonsyork.co.uk

Lady Anne House is a former almshouse, now a hotel, in York, England.

The almshouse was founded by Ann Middleton in 1659, on a site on Skeldergate in the Bishophill area of York. Known as Middleton's Hospital, it had 22 apartments around a small yard, housing 20 widows.

In 1827, the hospital was demolished, and rebuilt further back from the street, as a two-storey brick structure. It was designed by Peter Atkinson, and was completed in 1829. The garden walls also date from this period. In the centre of the front is a statue of a woman in Puritan dress, which is believed to survive from the original building.

In 1939, the building was modernised to house ten residents and a warden; however, by 1972, the building was in a poor state of repair. It was purchased by the owners of the hotel at 56 Skeldergate, who restored it, and incorporated it into their hotel, which is now known as Middletons Hotel. Since 1954, it has been a Grade II* listed building.

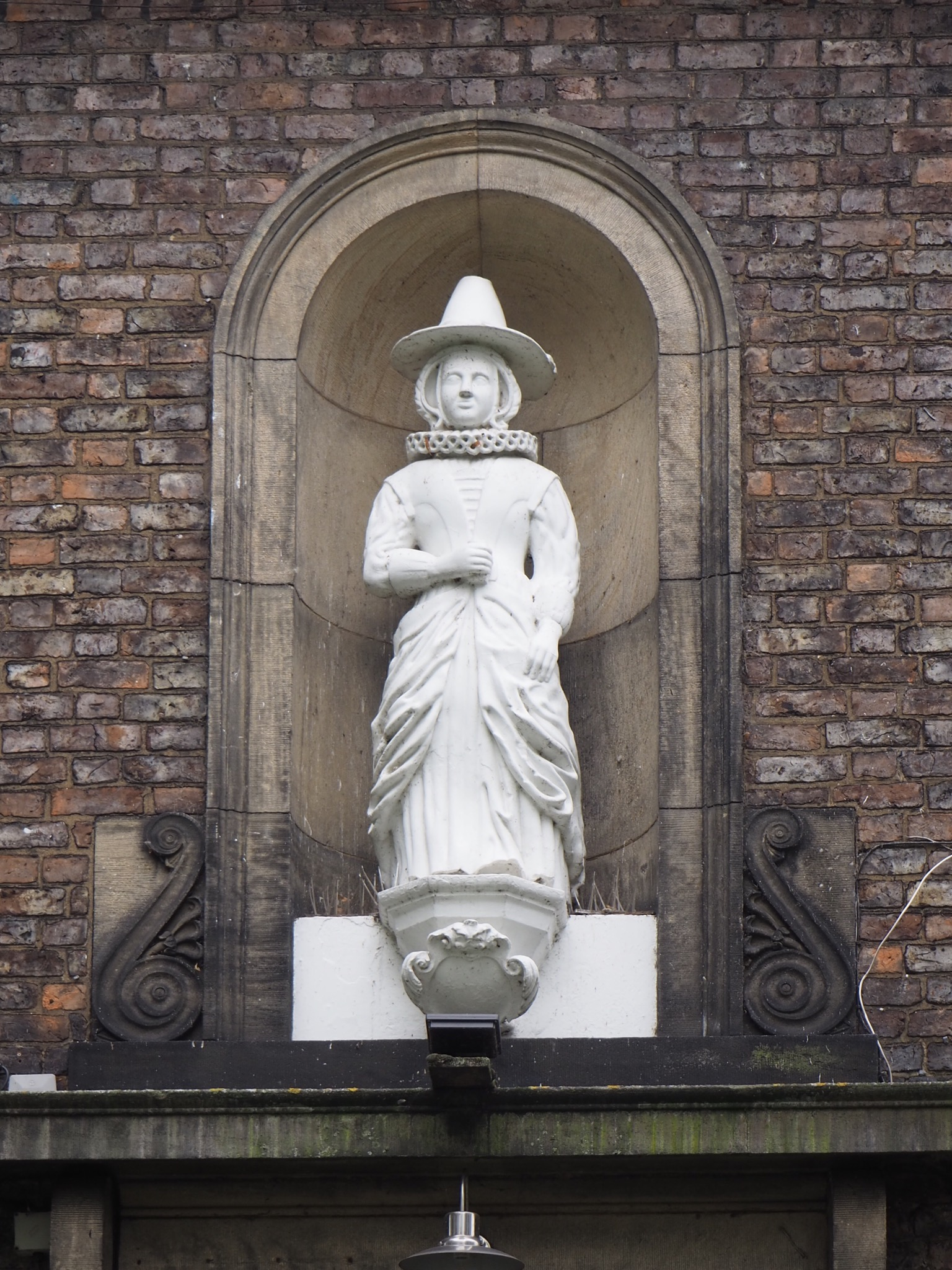
The statue of Ann Middleton

== See also ==
- Grade II* listed buildings in the City of York
- Listed buildings in York (within the city walls, southern part)
