= St Mary Bishophill Senior =

Church in York, England

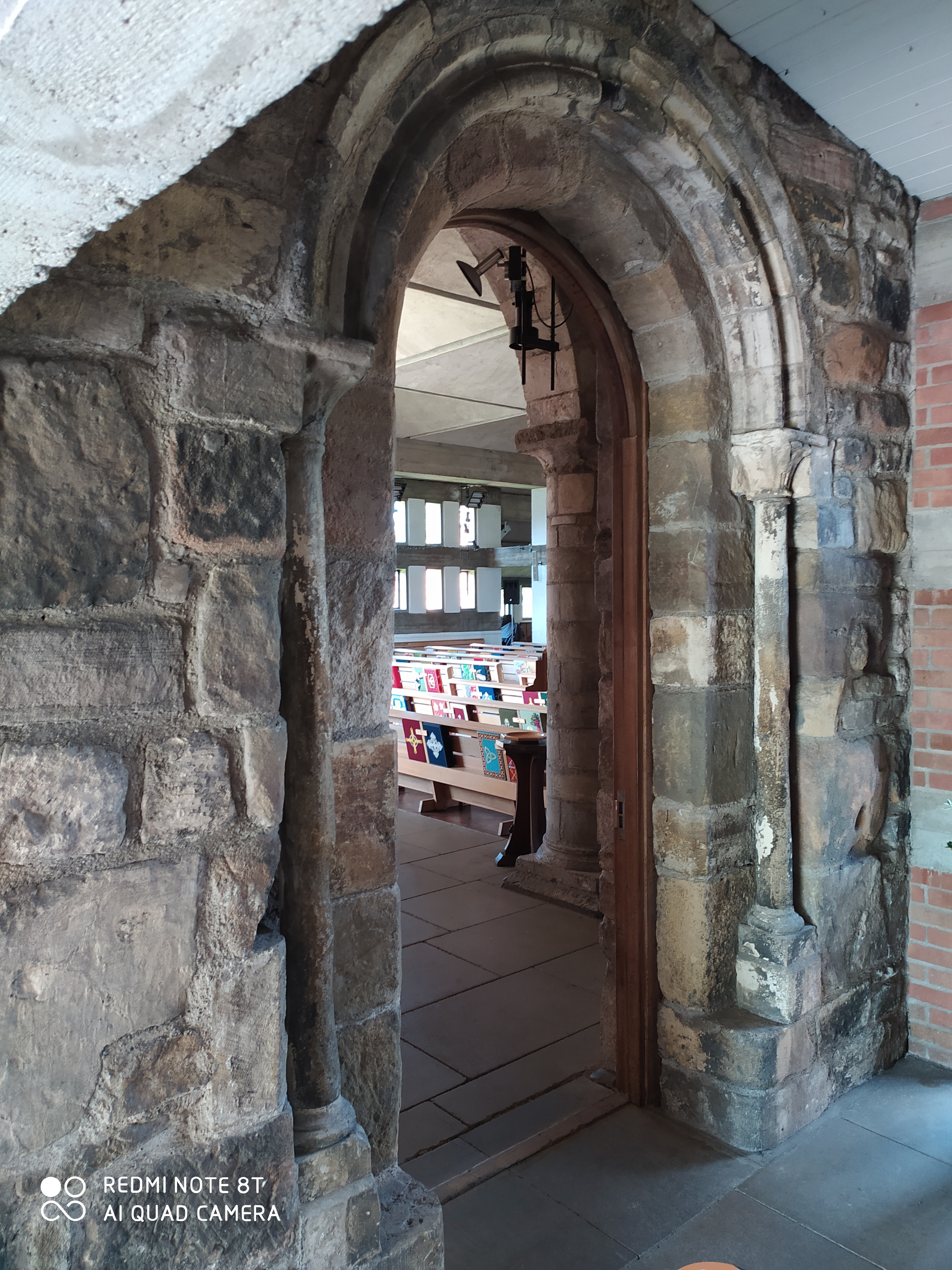
- Former doorway of the church
- St Mary Bishophill Senior
- 53.95533°N 1.08484°W
- OS grid reference: SE 60129 51408
- Location: York, North Yorkshire
- Address: Bishophill Senior, York
- Country: England
- Denomination: Church of England

History
- Status: Demolished
- Dedication: Virgin Mary

Architecture
- Style: Gothic
- Years built: 11th century
- Closed: 1930
- Demolished: 1963

Specifications
- Materials: Stone

Administration
- Province: York
- Diocese: York
- Archdeaconry: York

St Mary Bishophill Senior was an Anglican parish church in the Bishophill area of York, in England.

In about 350, a villa was built on the site, with an open courtyard. In the 10th century, a rectangular enclosure was formed on the site, probably representing a religious burial ground. A church was constructed in the early 11th century, a small rectangular stone building, reusing some Roman and Northumbrian stones. In about 1180, a north aisle was added, and a south door was inserted. The enclosure was also enlarged, to both east and west. In the early 13th century, a chancel was added, longer than the original structure, which became the church nave. In about 1300, the north aisle was extended one bay further east, and in about 1319 a north chapel was built. The north aisle of the chancel was rebuilt, perhaps in 1403, while in the late 15th century two south windows were inserted, and the east window and roof were replaced. In the 17th century, brick was used to heighten the chancel, and in 1659 a north west tower was built, replacing a detached tower in the churchyard.

The oldest surviving record of the church dates from 1202. Both the crown and successive noble families had the right to appoint rectors, and the church often had two incumbents, until the mid 18th century. In 1586, the parish was extended to include Clementhorpe, outside York city walls.

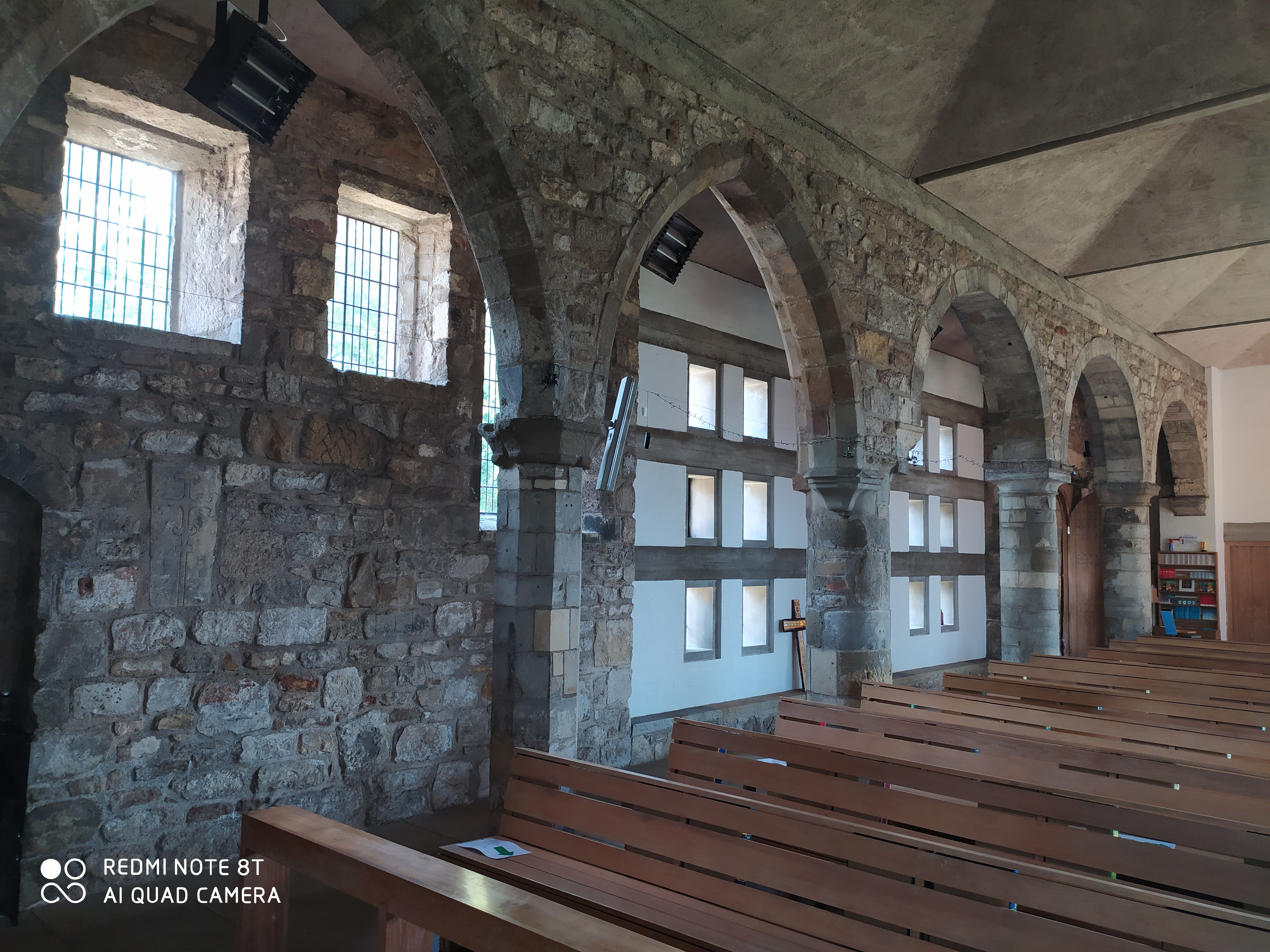
The south arcade at Holy Redeemer, reusing part of the arcade from St Mary Bishophill Senior

Work on the church continued when a brick porch was added in the late 18th century, and in 1841 a gallery was built, to house a growing congregation. The church was restored in 1866 by J. B. and W. Atkinson, but it soon fell into decline. in 1876 the new St Clement's Church was made the parish church, with St Mary reduced to being a chapel of ease. This decision was unpopular with parishoners, and in 1885 the church was instead moved into the parish of St Mary Bishophill Junior. The church was used for worship until 1919, and was closed entirely in 1930. By 1950, it was in a poor state of repair, and although it was grade I listed, it was demolished in 1963. Excavations were carried out on the site, but speculation that there had been a Saxon cathedral on the site was not confirmed.

On demolition, some monuments and fittings were moved to St Clement's Church on Scarcroft Road, the organ and plate were moved to St Mary Bishophill Junior, and parts of the fabric were re-used in the construction of Holy Redeemer Church, on Boroughbridge Road. Shortly after, York Civic Trust described these as "all the interesting parts of the structure".

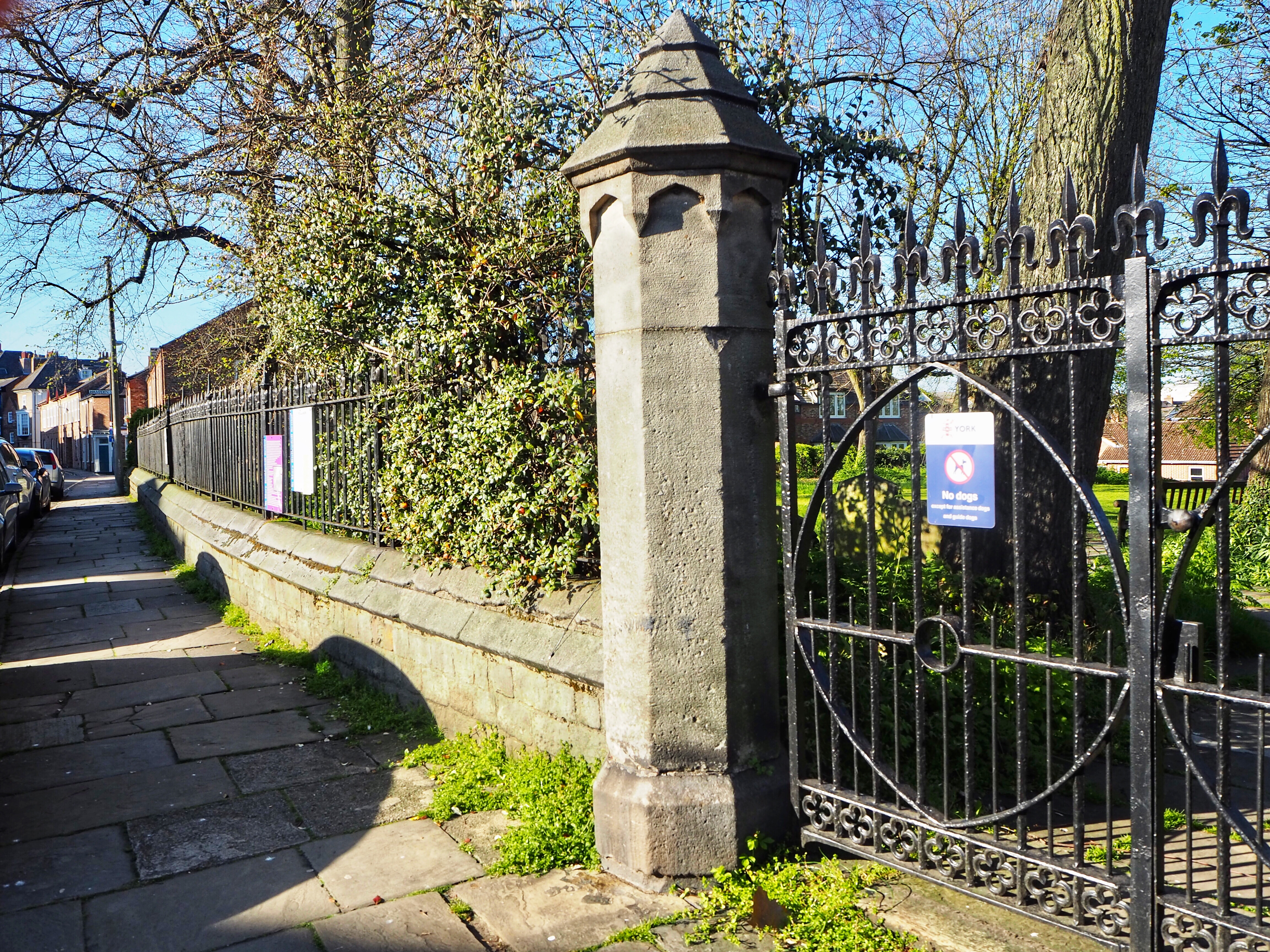
Part of the boundary wall, seen in 2023

The churchyard survives, including a number of memorials, and the wall and gates, which largely date from the 17th to the 19th centuries and are grade II listed. The section to the south-east may incorporate part of the Saxon boundary wall.
