= Bonding Warehouse =

Listed building in York, England

- The building seen across the River Ouse in 2024
- Interactive map of the Bonding Warehouse area
- Former names: Bonded Warehouse

General information
- Status: Converted into apartments and coworking space
- Type: Bonded warehouse
- Location: Skeldergate, York, England
- Coordinates: 53°57′16″N 1°04′56″W
- Year built: 1875; 151 years ago
- Client: York Corporation

Design and construction
- Architect: George Styan
- Designations

Listed Building – Grade II
- Official name: Bonding Warehouse and attached walls, railings and gate piers
- Designated: 14 February 1977
- Reference no.: 1256638

Website
- Official website

The Bonding Warehouse is a historic building in the city centre of York, England.

The building lies between Skeldergate and the southwest bank of the River Ouse. It was constructed in two sections: the northern block was built between 1872 and 1873, and the southern block in 1875. Both were designed by George Styan, surveyor to the city of York. It was originally known as the Bonded Warehouse and commissioned by York Corporation for customs house officials to store goods on which duty had not yet been paid.

In the 20th century, commercial traffic on the river declined, and the warehouse closed in 1958. It was then used by Rowntree's for storage, and in 1981 was converted into a pub and steakhouse. In the 1990s it became a music and comedy venue, but closed in 2000 following flooding. In 2004 it was briefly squatted by the York Peace Collective. In 2012 it was converted into a mix of offices and apartments, with concrete casings and a new footbridge enabling access even when the surrounding area was flooded. The building has been Grade II listed since 1977. Since 2024 it has included workspace operated by the coworking company Patch.

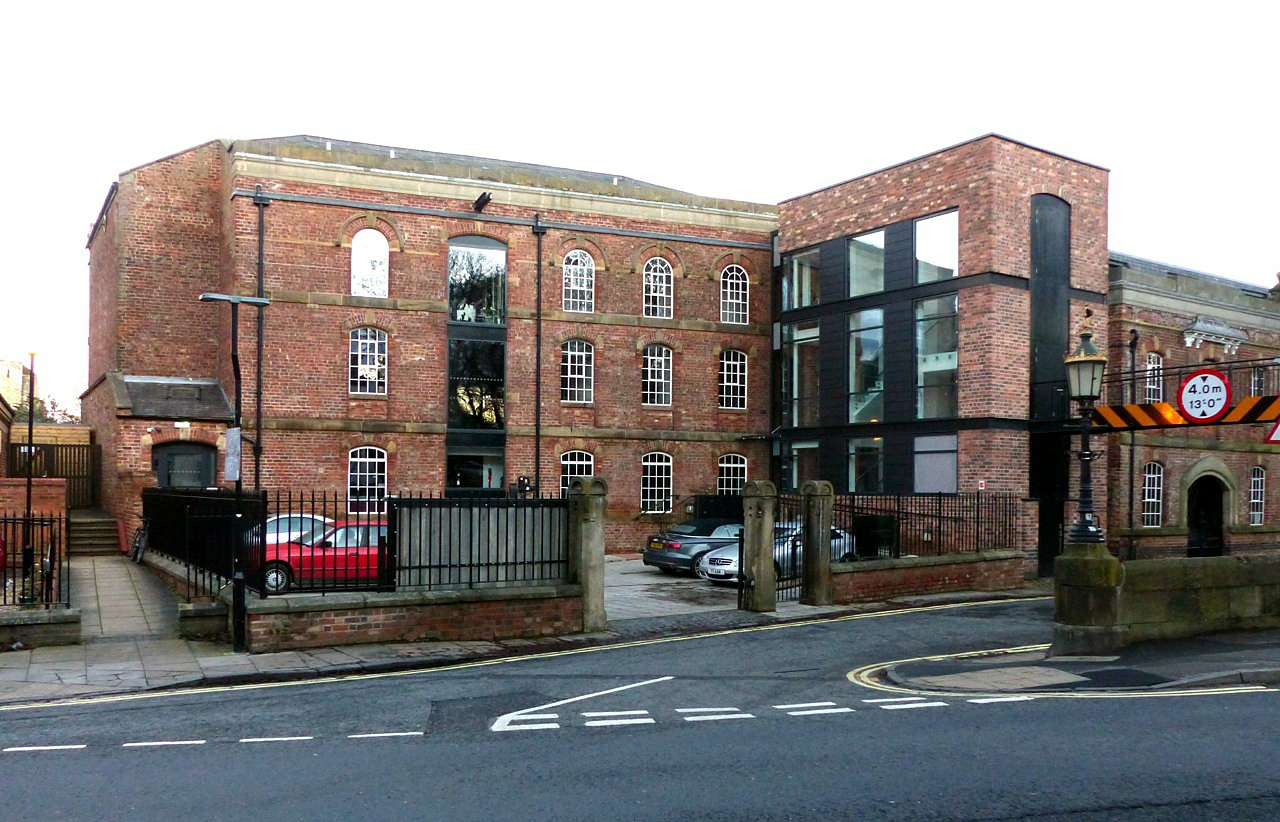
View from Skeldergate, in 2018

The building is constructed of pink brick, with multicoloured brick dressings, an ashlar plinth on the riverside front, and slate roofs. The northern block has three storeys and is seven bays wide, and the southern block has two storeys and six bays. The central bay of the northern block has original lifting doors on the upper floors. A parapet rises to a gable over the central bay. The southeast front has two storeys and is five bays wide, with a gable over the central bay inscribed "BONDING WAREHOUSE/ AD 1875". On the street front, the northern block is mostly six bays wide, with a single bay to the left set further back. There are lifting doors in the second bay, and the southern block projects further forward.

Inside, the northern block has an original full-height stone staircase with cast-iron bannisters and handrail. The lower floors have brick vaulting on cast-iron columns. The roof of the northern block has five queen-post trusses, and the southern block has four king-post trusses.

== See also ==
- Listed buildings in York (within the city walls, southern part)
