= Golden Ball, York =

Listed pub in North Yorkshire, England

Golden Ball
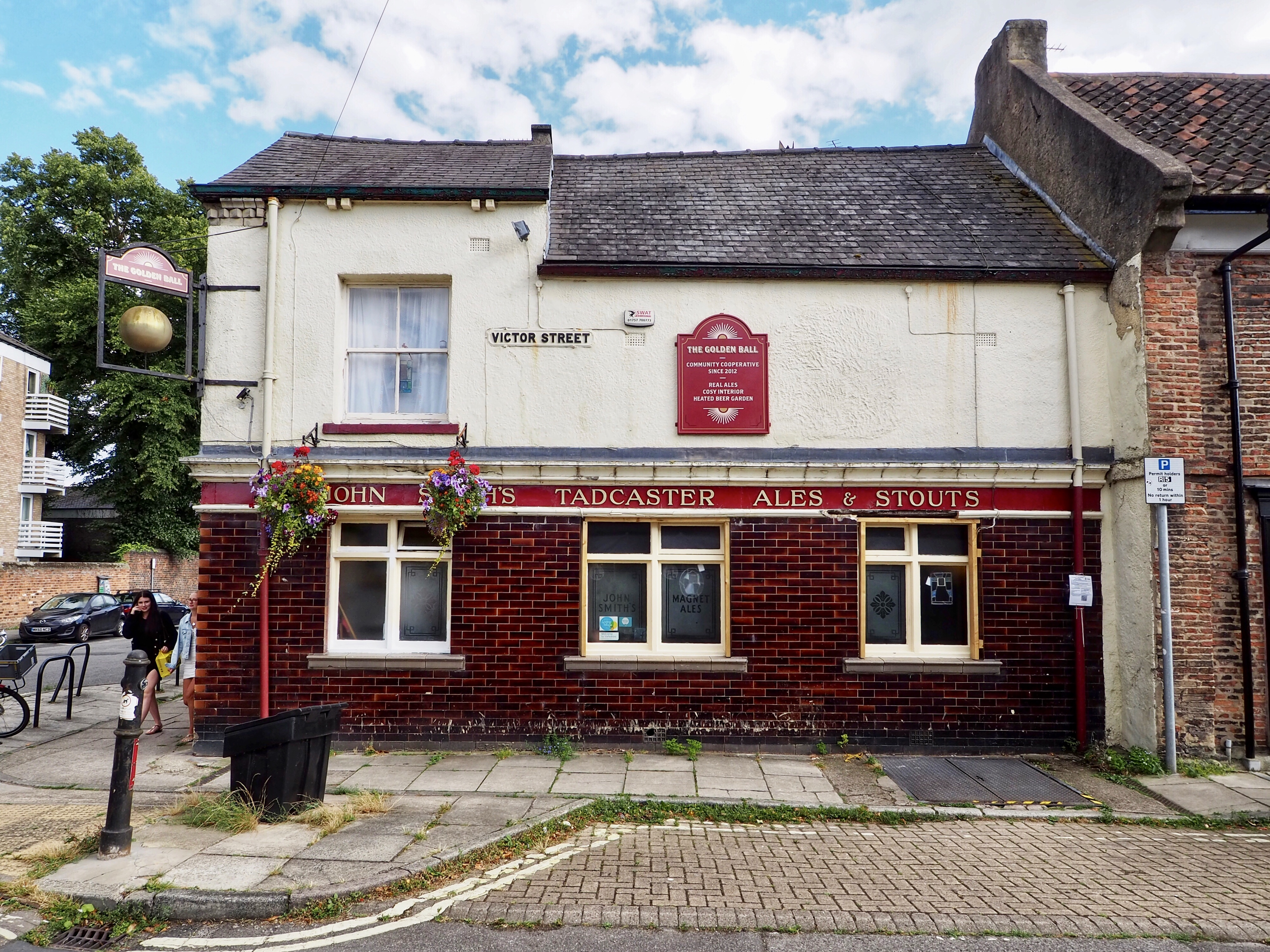
- The pub in 2024

General information
- Type: Public house
- Location: 2 Cromwell Road, York, England
- Coordinates: 53.9549°N 1.0851°W
- Year built: Early 19th century
- Renovated: 1883 (extended); 1929 (remodelled)
- Owner: Golden Ball Community Co-operative

Renovating team
- Architect: Bertram Wilson (1929)

Website
- goldenballyork.co.uk

Listed Building – Grade II
- Official name: The Golden Ball public house
- Designated: 14 April 2010
- Reference no.: 1393746

The Golden Ball is a Grade II listed public house on Cromwell Road in the Bishophill area of central York, England. Although parts of the building date from the early 19th century, the pub is particularly noted for its largely intact 1929 remodelling by architect Bertram Wilson for John Smith's Brewery. Its interior is included in the Campaign for Real Ale (CAMRA)'s National Inventory of Historic Pub Interiors, where it is rated three stars and regarded as being of "outstanding national historic importance". Since 2012, the pub has been owned by a co-operative of local residents.

== History ==
The first record of the pub was in 1773. The core part of the building was constructed in the early 19th century. In 1883, a house for the publican was constructed by Benson & Minks, adjoining the pub. The pub was sold to Braime's Brewery in 1884, and this in 1902 was taken over by John Smith's Brewery. In 1929, the pub was constructed by their architect Bertram Wilson. He combined the two buildings, raised the ceiling height in the older part of the building, and decorated the front of the pub.

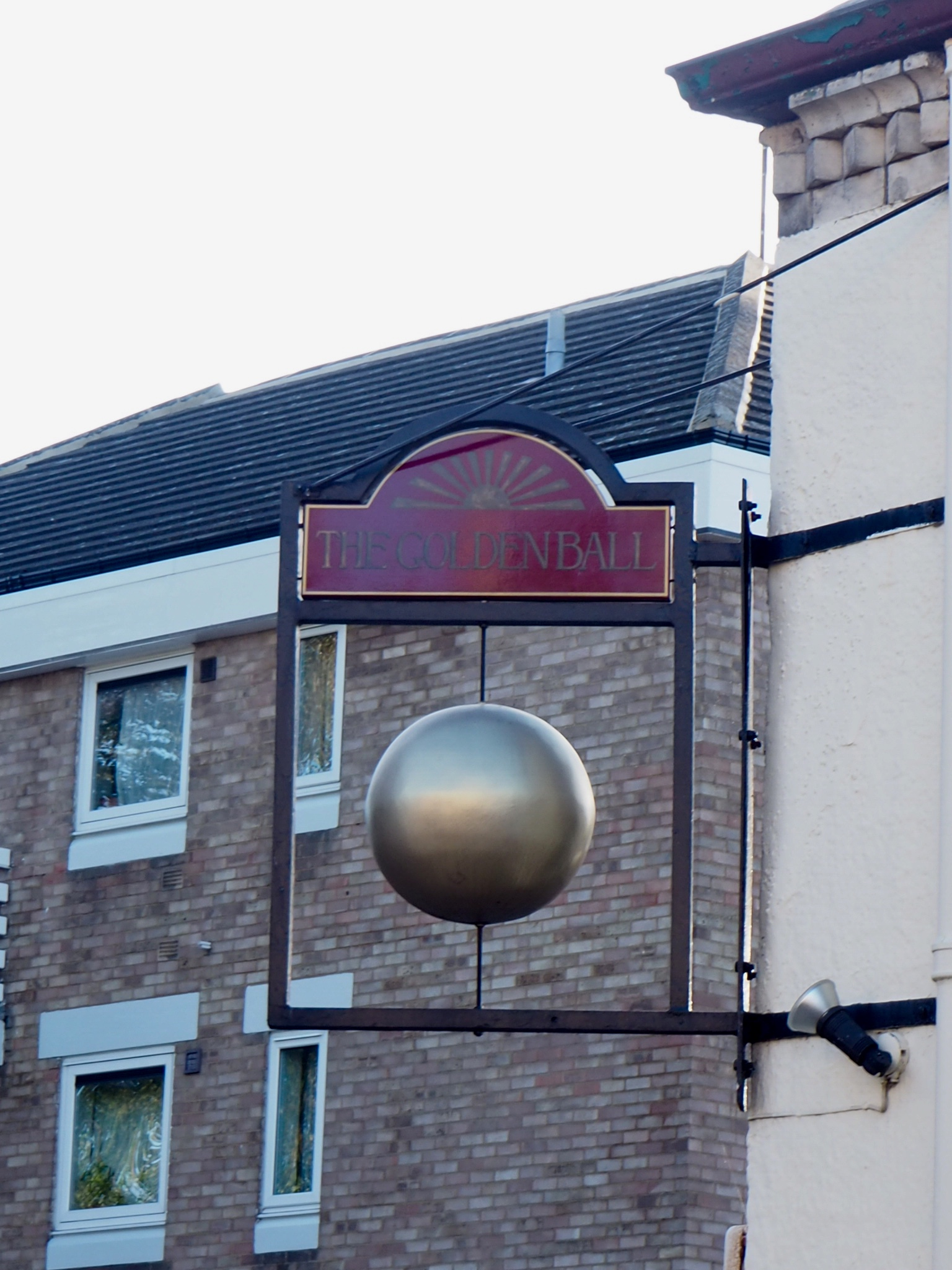
The exterior sign visible from both Cromwell Road and Victor Street

In the 1990s, an additional room was added to the pub, from what was formerly a private area. The pub has otherwise been little altered since the 1920s, and is described by the Campaign for Real Ale (CAMRA) as "the most complete surviving inter-war scheme by John Smith's".

On 14 April 2010, following a successful application by CAMRA, the Golden Ball was designated a Grade II listed building. It was included on CAMRA's National Inventory of Historic Pub Interiors before the inventory's grading system was revised. Under the revised scheme, it is rated three stars and its interior is regarded as being "of outstanding national historic importance".

In 2012, the pub was taken over by a co-operative of local residents. Since then, it has held beer festivals, an annual summer fete, and sells works by local artists. It also hosts local music nights.

== Architecture ==
=== Exterior ===
The pub occupies a corner site and has two storeys above a cellar. Its frontage extends along both Cromwell Road and Victor Street, with part of an 1883 extension continuing into the adjoining building. The ground floor is faced in brown glazed brick, while the upper floor is rendered and painted cream. A decorative tiled band separates the two levels.

Along Cromwell Road are two entrance doorways, one at either end of the façade, with original signs identifying them as the main entrance and the former jug-and-bottle department. Between them are two multi-pane windows, one retaining etched glass bearing the name of the pub. Further lettering identifying the Golden Ball survives above the windows. The upper floor contains two sash windows beneath a decorative brick eaves course.

The Victor Street elevation contains three ground-floor windows of similar design. Several retain etched glass with decorative patterns and historic brewery advertising, including references to John Smith's and Magnet Ales. Above the windows is surviving signage promoting John Smith's Tadcaster ales and stouts. The upper floor contains a single sash window.

=== Interior ===
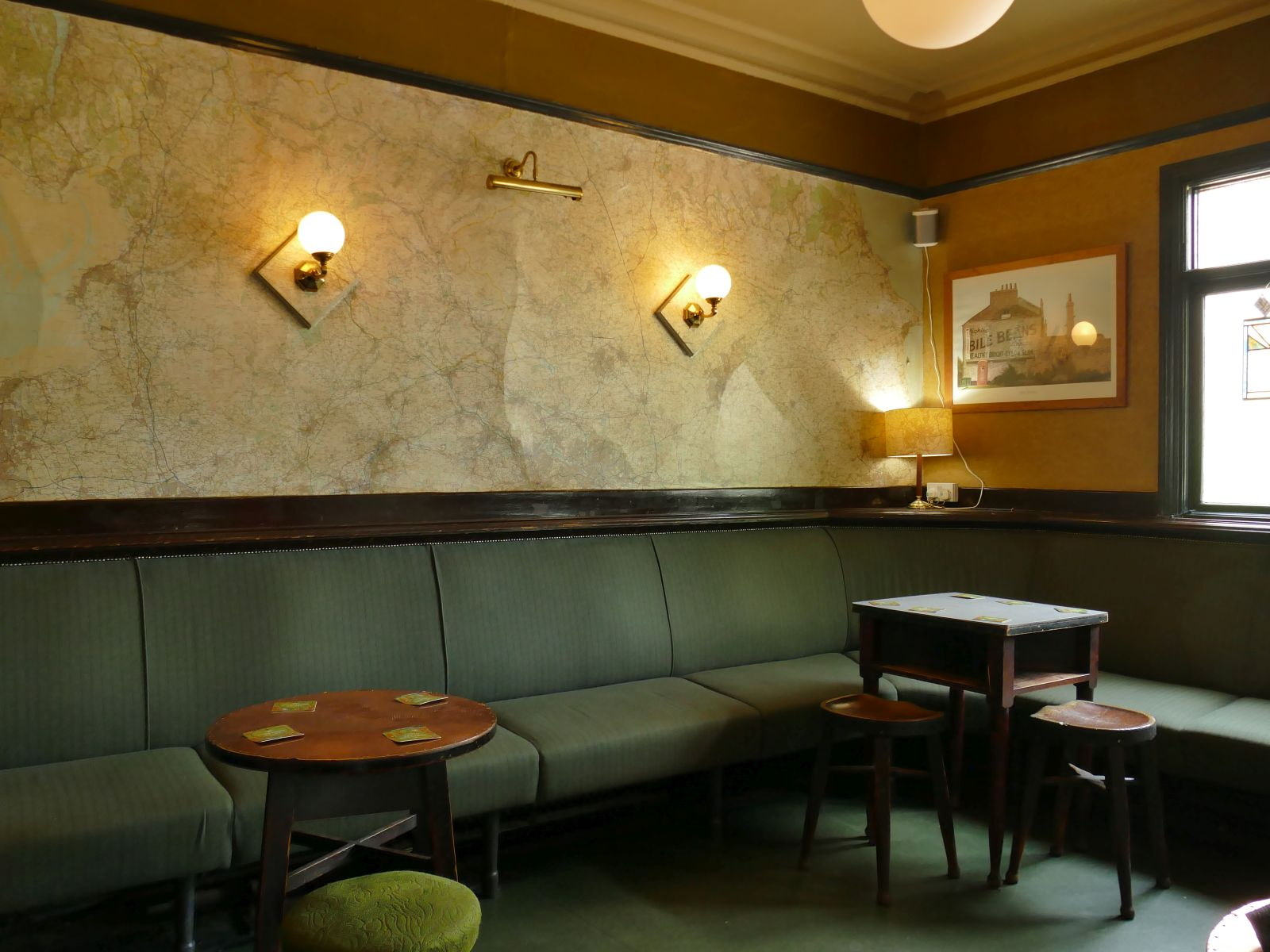
The rear bar lounge in 2023

Much of the interior dating from the 1929 refurbishment survives. The layout is unusual, with a single entrance serving the drinking areas and a small hall alcove adjoining the bar, a feature described by CAMRA as having no known parallel. Original features include doors and surrounds serving the inner lobby, public bar, smoke room and cellar. Decorative cream wall tiles with black and orange bands remain in the entrance lobby, public bar and former off-sales area, while parts of the serving counter, rear fittings and glazed screens also survive. Fixed seating is retained in the principal rooms and hall alcove, together with a bell-push rail in the smoke room.

Other surviving features include a rare tiled bar counter, a largely intact bar back, and etched glass advertising John Smith's and Magnet Ales. Other historic features include a terrazzo floor in the hall alcove, moulded cornices, a timber fireplace surround in the public bar, and internal windows between the hall alcove and adjoining corridors. The smoke room also preserves elements of its Victorian character, including fixed seating and a fireplace. Some elements, including parts of the glazing, the smoke-room fireplace and doorway screens, are later additions.

== See also ==
- Listed buildings in York (within the city walls, southern part)
