= Skeldergate =

Street in York, England

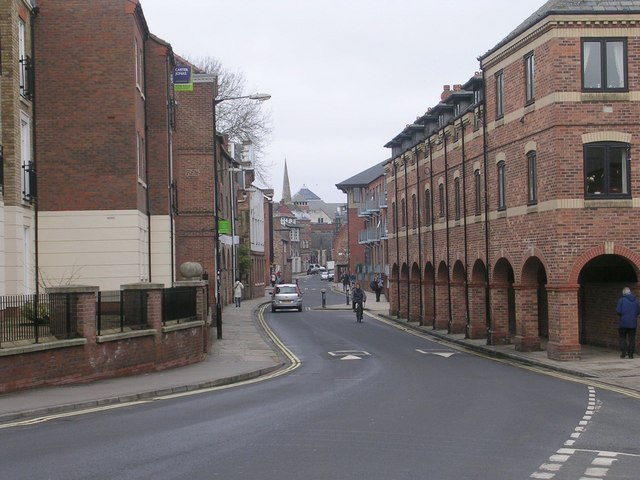
- Looking north on Skeldergate, from Bishopgate Street
- Location within York
- Location: York, England
- Coordinates: 53.9556°N 1.0837°W
- North west end: Micklegate; North Street; Bridge Street
- South east end: Bishopgate Road

Skeldergate is a street in the city centre of York, in England. The street is now primarily residential, with many of its warehouse buildings having been converted into apartments.

== History ==
During the Roman Eboracum period, the area in which Skeldergate runs lay within the civilian settlement. Trade took place throughout the area, and also in the Viking Jorvik period. The street's name is of Viking origin, and is often supposed to have derived from shield-makers in the area, but the Inventory of the Historical Monuments in City of York argues that there is no evidence for this industry in the area, and that such a niche trade would be unlikely to have given its name to an important city street. Instead, its name might derive from "skelde", meaning a shelf, and referring to the location of the street between the River Ouse and the then-terraced slope up to Bishophill, or alternatively, from the Viking name "Skjoldr", meaning a shield.

The street was first recorded in the 12th-century, and by 1282, the land along the street was divided into 68 plots, or "tofts". This made it the second-most important street on the south bank of the Ouse, after Micklegate. The land between the street and the river became the main area for dockside activity in the city, various wharves, and a crane, along with an assortment of warehouses. In 1660, the Queen's Staith was built parallel to the street, running up to Ouse Bridge. The landward side became dominated by large houses, belonging to wealthy merchants. In 1765, the architect John Carr built himself a house on the street.

In the 12th-century, the new York city walls were completed. The southern end of the street ran through the Skeldergate Postern gate, and a ferry operated across the Ouse at this point. The gate was demolished in 1808, and the wall between the gate and the river in 1878, to allow the construction of the Skeldergate Bridge, which now forms part of the city's inner ring road.

The decline of trade on the river in the 20th-century led to the demolition of many of the warehouses, including the 17th-century Dutch warehouse, along with several other notable buildings, such as the Plumbers Arms, dating from 1575, and John Carr's house. These demolitions continued until the 1980s, since when, many of the surviving warehouses have been converted into apartments, and the street is now primarily residential. The street is prone to flooding, and as a result, the ground floors of many buildings on the river side are given over to car parking.

== Architecture and layout ==
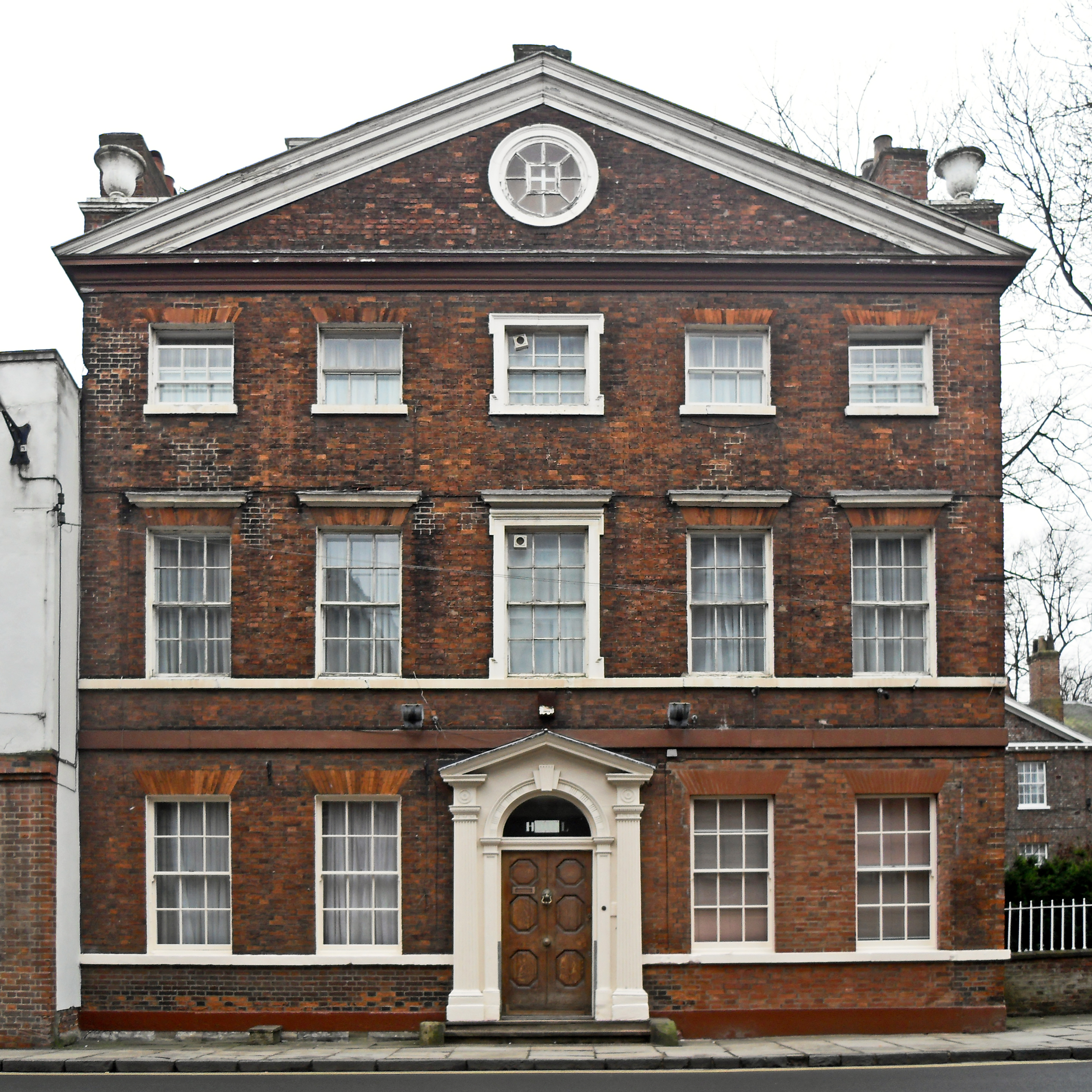
Skeldergate House Hotel

The street runs south-east from the junction of Micklegate, North Street and Bridge Street, to meet Bishopgate Road near Skeldergate Bridge. Fetter Lane, Buckingham Street, Albion Street, and Cromwell Road all lead off the south-western side, while only Queen's Staith and Terry Avenue lead off the north-eastern side.

Despite the demolitions, several notable buildings remain on the street. On the south-west side, there are two buildings from the former Emperor's Wharf sawmill, Skeldergate House Hotel, which dates from 1777, Middleton's Hospital, originally dating from 1659, and the 19th-century Terry Memorial Homes. Buildings on the north-east side include the modern Albion Wharf and City Mills blocks, both praised in Pevsner, and the late 19th-century Bonding Warehouse.
