= The Mount =

The Mount may refer to:

== Geography ==
- Mount Maunganui, or "The Mount", a suburb of Tauranga, New Zealand
- The Mount, Belfast, an electoral ward in Northern Ireland
- The Mounts, a hamlet in Devon, England
- The Mount (York), a street in York, England

== Publications ==
- The Mount (novel), by Carol Emshwiller
- At-Tur, "The Mount", the 52nd sura of the Qur'an

== Buildings ==
- The Mount, Fleetwood, a pavilion in Lancashire, England
- The Mount (Gibraltar), the former official residence of the senior officer of the Royal Navy
- The Mount (HM Prison), a men's prison in Hertfordshire, England
- The Mount (hospital), a psychiatric hospital in Leeds, West Yorkshire, England
- The Mount (Lenox, Massachusetts), the home of author Edith Wharton
- The Mount (stadium), a former stadium in Catford, Greater London, England
- The Mount, North Yorkshire, a hunting tower in England
- The Mount, Sheffield, a listed building in South Yorkshire, England
- The Mount, Wigan, a public house in Greater Manchester, England
- The Mount, York (pub), a public house in North Yorkshire, England

== Schools ==
- Mount St. Mary's University (Maryland), or "The Mount", a Catholic seminary in Emmittsburg, MD
- Mount Saint Michael Academy, or "The Mount", a high school in New York
- Mount Saint Vincent University, or "The Mount", in Nova Scotia, Canada
- The Mount School, York, England

== See also ==
- The Sermon on the Mount, a collection of sayings and teachings of Jesus Christ
- Mount (disambiguation)
- The Mountain (disambiguation)
- The Hill (disambiguation)
