= High Royds =

High Royds, High Royd, Highroyd or Highroyds may refer to several different places.

Two separate areas in Yorkshire, England:

- a part of Menston, West Yorkshire:
  - Highroyds Village – a residential development on the site of the former High Royds Hospital, which was also
  - the terminus of the High Royds Hospital Railway
- High Royds, South Yorkshire – a mining community near Barnsley, which was served by
  - High Royds railway station.

A historic house the suburb of Annandale, Sydney, Australia:

- Highroyd, Annandale.
