= Royds =

Royds may refer to:

- Royds, Bradford, a ward in Bradford Metropolitan District in West Yorkshire, England
- Cape Royds, a dark rock cape forming the west extremity of Ross Island,
- High Royds Hospital, former psychiatric hospital south of the village of Menston, West Yorkshire, England
- Royds Hall School, comprehensive school in Huddersfield, West Yorkshire, England
- High Royds railway station, former station near Barnsley on the South Yorkshire Railway
- High Royds Hospital Railway, short railway connecting the West Riding County Asylum near Leeds in West Yorkshire with the Midland Railway
- Royds (surname)
