= Windmill Inn =

Listed pub in York, England

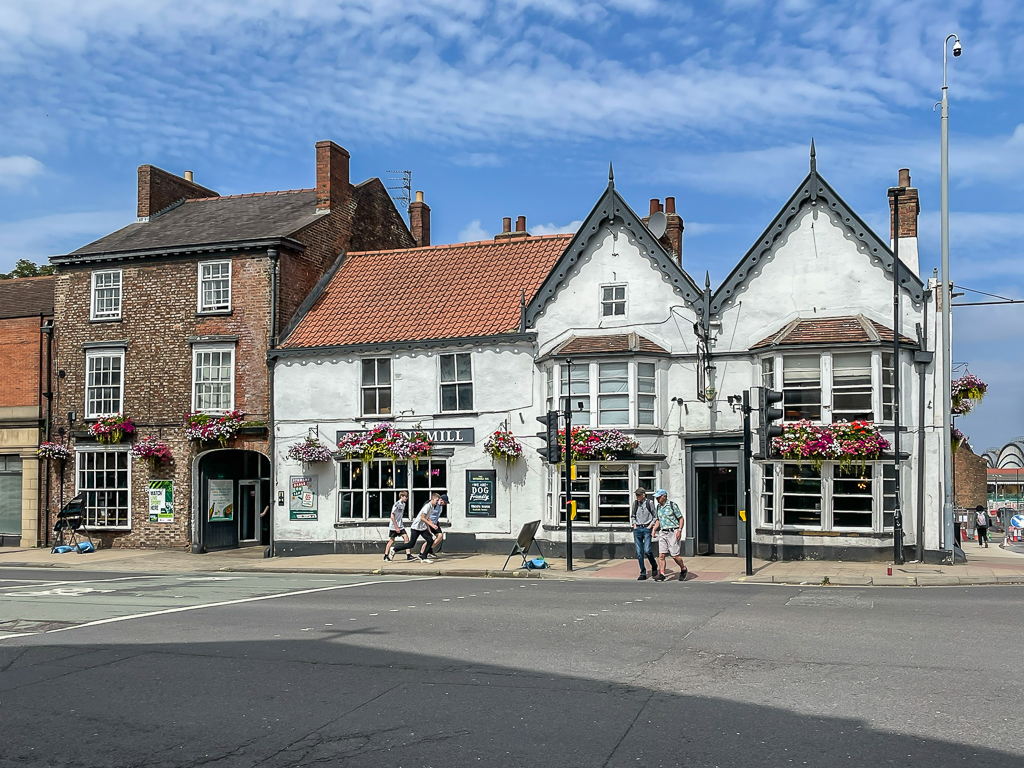
- The pub in 2025, seen from the south
- Interactive map of the Windmill Inn area
- Alternative names: Windmill Hotel

General information
- Type: Public house
- Location: 14–16 Blossom Street, York, England
- Coordinates: 53°57′20″N 1°5′30″W
- Year built: Late 17th century
- Renovated: Late 18th century (altered); Early and mid-19th century (altered) c. 1890 (added); 1994 (remodelled)
- Owner: Greene King

Design and construction
- Designations

Listed Building – Grade II
- Official name: Windmill Hotel
- Designated: 1 July 1968
- Reference no.: 1259525

Website
- Official website

The Windmill Inn is a public house on Blossom Street, immediately west of the city centre of York, England.

The oldest part of the pub stands on the corner of Blossom Street and Queen Street, although until 1911 another building separated it from Queen Street. Dating from the late 17th century, it was constructed as two cottages and was probably part of reconstruction in the area following the Siege of York. This section is brick-built, but with timber-framed internal partitions. It contains early chimney breasts and a mid-18th-century staircase, and the bay windows at the front date from 1785 or earlier, although they have been heavily altered.

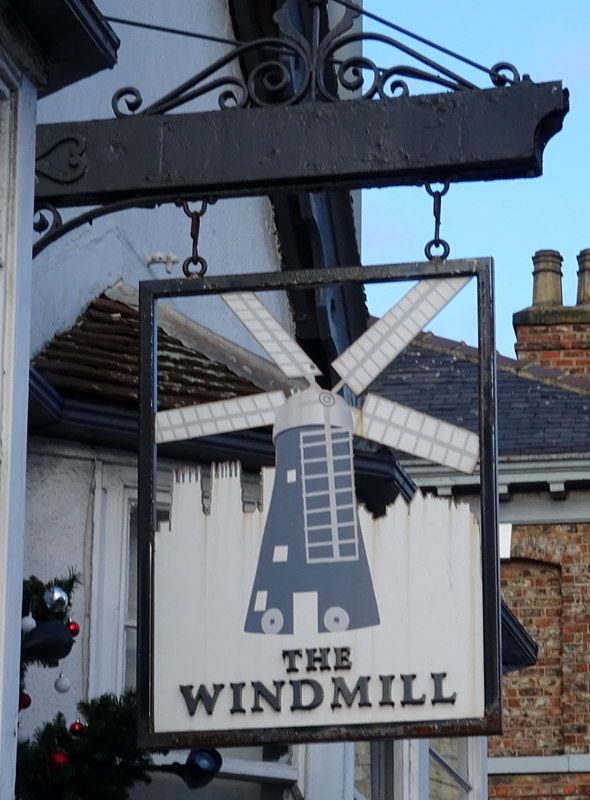
The sign above the entrance

The building is first recorded as the "Windmill Inn" in a deed of 1735. At the time, it was owned by the Lee family, who had previously leased a windmill near the top of The Mount. Soon after the purchase, it was extended south along Blossom Street, and in 1820 a further extension was added to the south, incorporating a carriage arch into the hotel's yard. A stable range was also added behind the main range. In about 1890, the building was extended to the west along Queen Street, with the extension incorporating parts of a mid-18th-century building, including its staircase and doors dating to about 1840.

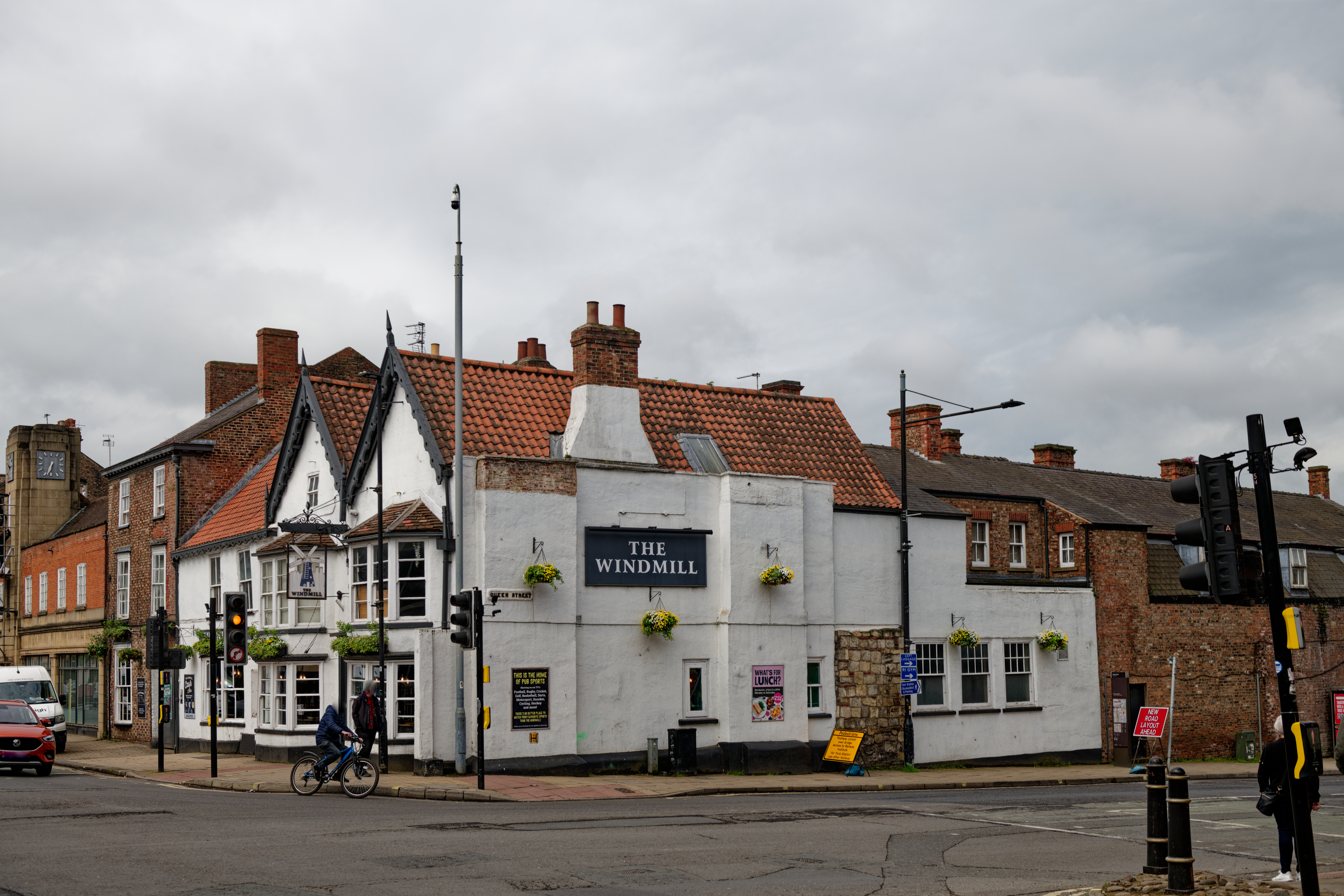
The pub in 2024, seen from Micklegate Bar

When the inn was sold in 1867, it was advertised as one of the oldest in the city and having stabling for 65 horses, with a total value of £800. Trade increased with the opening of York railway station nearby, and in 1893 it sold for £3,750, including a neighbouring brewhouse. By 1902, it had 21 bedrooms available, and it began catering to cyclists and motor-car drivers.

Legend holds that the pub is haunted by the ghost of a girl who was run over by a brewer's cart, and also by an ostler. A mysterious cold mist has also been reported. The York Press has listed the pub as one of the five most haunted in the city.

Since 1968, the building has been Grade II listed. As of 2022, the pub is owned by Greene King.

== See also ==
- Listed buildings in York (outside the city walls, southern part)
