= The Hills =

The Hills may refer to:

== Popular culture ==
- "The Hills" (song), a 2015 song by The Weeknd from his second studio album Beauty Behind the Madness
- The Hills (TV series), an American reality television series that aired from 2006–2010
  - The Hills: New Beginnings, the sequel series that premiered in 2019

== Places ==
=== United States ===
- Neighborhoods within the Santa Monica Mountains in Los Angeles, California
  - Bel Air, Los Angeles
  - Beverly Hills, California
  - Hollywood Hills
- The Hills, New Jersey, a census-designated place
- The Hills, Texas, a village

=== Australia ===
- Adelaide Hills, a section of the Mount Lofty Ranges
- Hills District, New South Wales, a district within Sydney
- The Hills Shire, a local government area within Sydney

== See also ==
- The Hill (disambiguation)
- Hills (disambiguation)
