= 39 Blossom Street =

Listed former pub in York, England

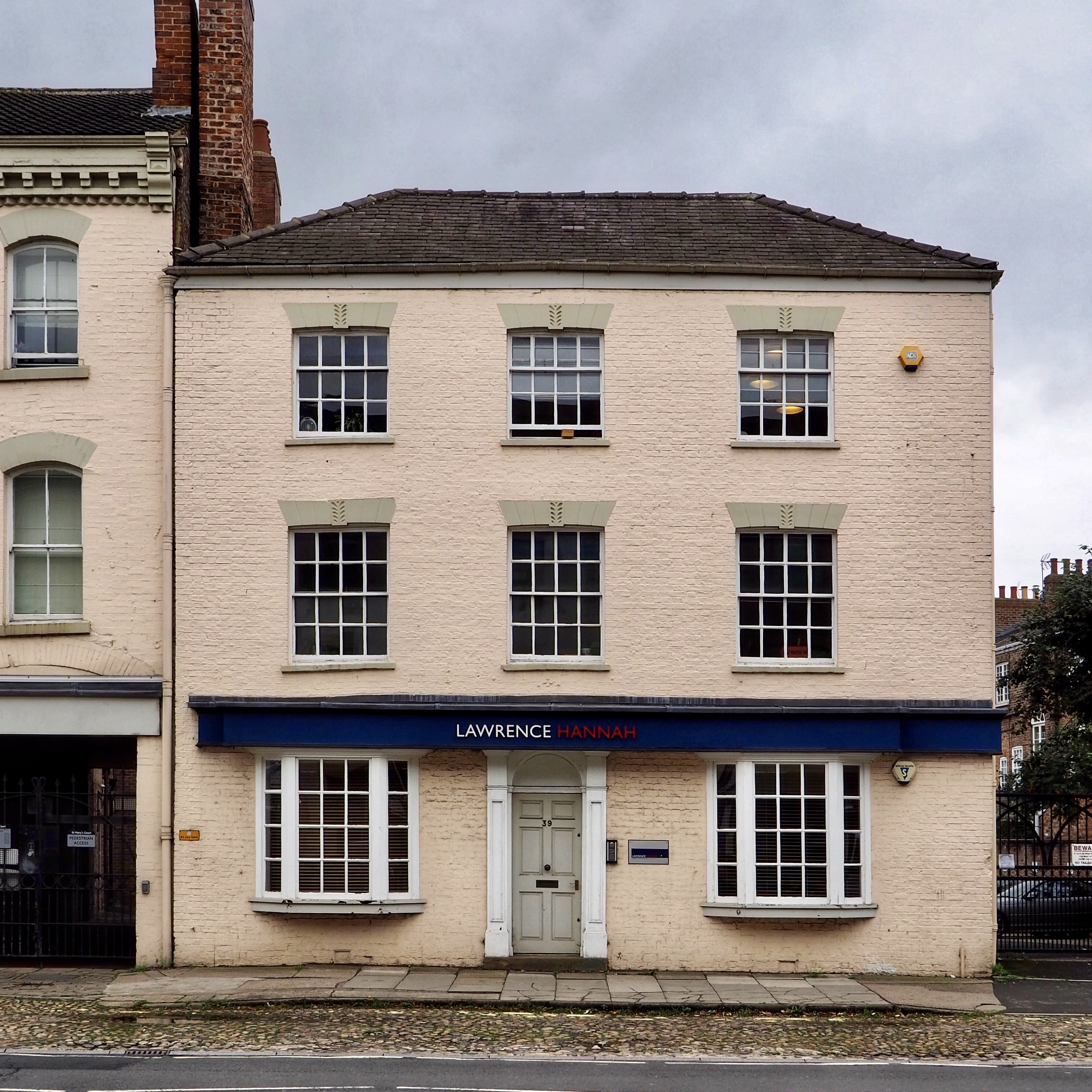
- The building in 2023
- Interactive map of the 39 Blossom Street area
- Former names: Lion and Lamb; Nickel and Dime

General information
- Status: Converted into offices
- Type: Public house (former)
- Location: Blossom Street, York, England
- Coordinates: 53.9547°N 1.0922°W
- Year built: 1828; 198 years ago
- Renovated: c. 1988 (converted)
- Closed: 1988 (as a pub)

Design and construction
- Designations

Listed Building – Grade II
- Official name: 39, Blossom Street
- Designated: 24 June 1983
- Reference no.: 1259497

39 Blossom Street is a Grade II listed former public house on Blossom Street in York, England. The site was first recorded in 1783 as the Lion and Lamb, and the present building was constructed in 1828. It traded as a pub throughout the 19th and 20th centuries, and the site was included in the Central Historic Core conservation area in 1968. Renamed the Nickel and Dime in 1987, it closed the following year and was later converted into offices.

== History ==
The site on Blossom Street was first mentioned in 1783 as the Lion and Lamb. The present building was constructed in 1828, serving as a public house. An advert in 1884 noted that the pub still provided stabling for ten horses.

In 1968 the site was included within the newly established Central Historic Core conservation area, and on 24 June 1983, No. 39, at that time trading as the Lion and Lamb, was designated a Grade II listed building. The pub was renamed the Nickel and Dime in 1987, but it closed the following year and was subsequently converted into offices.

== Architecture ==
The building has painted brickwork with painted detailing, and a hipped roof of slate. It has a symmetrical front of three storeys and three bays. The upper windows are sashes set beneath painted lintels with carved leaf motifs. A plain timber band runs across the front above the ground floor. The outer bays contain canted timber bay windows with glazing bars. The doorway has panelled side pieces and a six‑panel door, with a blind semi-circular head in place of an overlight. The guttering is supported on paired rectangular timber brackets.

== See also ==
- Listed buildings in York (outside the city walls, southern part)
