= The Mountain (disambiguation) =

The Mountain was a political group during the French Revolution.

The Mountain may also refer to:

== Places ==
- "The Mountain", nickname of the Mount Panorama Circuit, an auto racing circuit in Bathurst, New South Wales, Australia
- Mount Royal (la montagne/"the mountain"), a hill totally surrounded by the city of Montreal, Canada
- "The Mountain", nickname for the portion of the Niagara Escarpment within the city of Hamilton, Ontario, Canada
- Mount Rainier, often known simply as "the mountain" throughout Washington state in the United States
- "The Mountain", a section of British motor racing circuit Cadwell Park, named for its steep gradient
- “The Mountain”, the nickname of Falun Gong's Dragon Springs compound

== Arts and entertainment ==
=== Artworks ===
- The Mountain (Maillol), or La Montagne, a monumental sculpture by Aristide Maillol
- The Mountain, a post-modern artwork by Balthus

=== Films ===
- The Mountain (1956 film), starring Spencer Tracy and Robert Wagner
- The Mountain (1991 film), a Swiss film
- The Mountain (2012 film), a Turkish drama film
- The Mountain (2018 film), an American film
- The Mountain (2024 film), a New Zealand film

=== Music ===
==== Groups ====
- The Mountains, Danish musical band

==== Albums ====
- The Mountain (Dierks Bentley album), a 2018 album by Dierks Bentley
- The Mountain (Haken album), a 2013 album by Haken
- The Mountain (Heartless Bastards album), 2009
- The Mountain (Gorillaz album), 2026
- The Mountain (Steve Earle album), a 1999 album by Steve Earle with the Del McCoury Band
- The Mountain (EP), a 1995 EP by Will Oldham
- The Mountain, a 1989 album by Abdullah Ibrahim

==== Songs ====
- "The Mountain" (song), a 2018 song by Three Days Grace
- "The Mountain", a song by Blue Stahli from their 2021 album Obsidian
- "The Mountain", a song by Bob Seger from his 1991 album The Fire Inside
- "The Mountain", a song by Mason Jennings from his 2000 album Birds Flying Away
- "The Mountain", a song by Of Mice & Men from their 2019 album Earthandsky
- "The Mountain", s song by PJ Harvey from her 2007 album White Chalk
- "The Mountain", a song by Shawn Mendes from his 2024 album Shawn
- "The Mountain", an instrumental by Trans-Siberian Orchestra from their 2009 album Night Castle
- "The Mountain", a mostly instrumental track by Gorillaz from their 2026 album "The Mountain."

=== Other uses ===
- "The Mountain" (Adventure Time), an episode of the animated television series Adventure Time
- The Mountain (TV series), broadcast on the WB Television Network
- The Mountain (French: La neige en deuil), a 1952 French novel by Henri Troyat
- The Mountain, a 1996 novel by Dafydd ab Hugh
- The Mountain (novel), a 2012 novel by Drusilla Modjeska
- The Mountain, a 2017 short story collection by Paul Yoon
- "The Mountain", the nickname for Ser Gregor Clegane in the George R.R. Martin book series A Song of Ice and Fire, and its HBO television serialization Game of Thrones

== Radio stations ==
Entercom Communications radio stations:

- KHTP (103.7 FM), an adult alternative station in the Seattle metro area
- KQMT (99.5 FM), a classic rock station in the Denver area
- WKRZ-HD2 (98.5 HD2), old and new Adult Rock in Northeastern Pennsylvania
- WCQS (88.1 FM), an NPR station out of Asheville, North Carolina

== Political groups ==
- The Mountain (1849), a later French political group of the Second Republic

== People ==
- Hafþór Júlíus Björnsson, nicknamed "The Mountain" after his role as Gregor Clegane, Icelandic strongman and actor
- Félix Bautista (baseball), Dominican professional baseball player nicknamed "The Mountain"

== See also ==
- MountainWest Sports Network, a now-defunct TV channel of the Mountain West Conference, informally known as the mtn. but pronounced "the mountain"
- Mountain (disambiguation)
- The Mount (disambiguation)
- The Hill (disambiguation)
