= The Punch Bowl, Blossom Street =

Listed pub in York, England

The Punch Bowl
- The pub in 2025
- Interactive map of the The Punch Bowl area
- Former names: Punch Bowl Hotel

General information
- Type: Public house
- Location: 5–9 Blossom Street, York, England
- Coordinates: 53.9536°N 1.0751°W
- Years built: c. 1835 and c. 1863
- Renovated: 20th and 21st century (extended and altered)
- Owner: Wetherspoons

Design and construction
- Designations

Listed Building – Grade II
- Official name: The Punch Bowl Hotel
- Designated: 19 August 1971
- Reference no.: 1259524

Website
- Official website

The Punch Bowl is a Grade II listed public house on the corner of Blossom Street and Nunnery Lane in York, England. It was formed from adjoining buildings dating from about 1835 and 1863. The site has supported inns since the late 18th century and the premises were enlarged in 1895 and 1974. It was included in the Central Historic Core conservation area in 1968. JD Wetherspoon has owned the freehold since 2002.

== History ==
The earlier part of the building, fronting Blossom Street, dates from about 1835 and was built as a public house. A later section on Nunnery Lane, added around 1863, included shop premises. The site is on land once occupied by St Thomas' Hospital, founded in the late 14th century to support the poor, and lies close to the city walls near Micklegate Bar. An inn was first recorded in 1783 and was briefly known as the Fox and Hounds between 1822 and 1825.

The Punch Bowl was enlarged twice: first in 1895, when it took in the cab office next door, and again in 1974, when it absorbed a former butcher's shop on Nunnery Lane. Over time the two sections were brought into a single premises, and the building was used as both a pub and a hotel.

In 1968 the site was included within the newly established Central Historic Core conservation area, and on 19 August 1971, the Punch Bowl Hotel was designated a Grade II listed building.

The building was bought by JD Wetherspoon in 2002, when it was an existing pub with hotel accommodation on the first and second floors. The hotel use ceased soon afterwards. As of December 2025, the freehold is owned by Wetherspoons.

== Architecture ==
The pub sign in 2020

The building is of brick with painted stone and stucco detailing, and has a slate roof. The earlier section, facing Blossom Street, is three storeys and five bays wide. The upper windows are sashes set beneath flat brick arches. The ground floor is finished in painted rusticated render and has openings with elliptical heads. One bay contains a recessed 20th‑century entrance within a wide archway; two bays have broad window openings; another has a similar window with a narrow blind recess beside it and a doorway with a 20th‑century glazed door. At the far left is a carriage entrance. The guttering is timber and supported on paired brackets, and there are ridge chimneys to the left, to the right, and above the first bay.

To the right is a taller extension with a rounded corner bay and four bays facing Nunnery Lane. The upper windows here are sashes with sill bands and segmental brick arches with keystones. A continuous timber fascia and bracketed cornice runs above the ground floor. At street level the corner has four windows replacing former shopfronts, divided by timber pilasters that continue as far as the first bay on the Nunnery Lane side. One bay contains a sash window flanked by full‑height pilasters, while two others have doorways with matching pilasters and four‑panel doors with overlights containing margin panes. The gutter is timber with brackets, and there are three ridge chimneys along the roof.

== See also ==
- Listed buildings in York (outside the city walls, southern part)
