= Mount (surname) =

Mount is a surname. Notable people with the surname include:

- Anson Mount (born 1973), American actor
- Balfour Mount (1939–2025), Canadian physician
- Charles Mount (1928–1995), American artist
- Deiontrez Mount (born 1993), American football player
- Evelina Mount (1837–1920), American painter
- Ferdinand Mount (born 1939), British writer, novelist and columnist for The Sunday Times
- Harry Mount (born 1971), British author and journalist
- James A. Mount (1843–1901), Governor of Indiana
- Lambton Mount (1836–1931), Canadian-born Australian businessman
- Mason Mount (born 1999), English footballer
- Peggy Mount (1915–2001), English actress
- Pete Mount (1925–1990), American professional basketball player and father of Rick
- Rick Mount (born 1947), American professional basketball player and son of Pete
- Rita Mount (1885–1967), Canadian artist
- William Sidney Mount (1807–1868), American painter

== See also ==
- Evadne Mount, a fictional character created by Gilbert Adair
- Mount (disambiguation)
