= The Hill =

The Hill most frequently refers to Capitol Hill, Washington, D.C., and entities named after it, including:

- United States Congress, by metonymy
- The Hill (newspaper), an American political newspaper and digital news channel named after the metonym

The Hill may also refer to:

== Geography ==
=== Australia ===
- The Hill, New South Wales, a suburb of Newcastle
- The Hill, a former grassed section of the Sydney Cricket Ground stadium, Sydney

=== Canada ===
- The Hill, Edmonton, Alberta, Canada, location of the Edmonton Folk Music Festival
- Parliament Hill in Ottawa, Ontario, Canada

=== Germany ===
- The Hill, the slang designation for the United States Army Security Agency site located on the Teufelsberg (Devil's Mountain) in Berlin

=== Ireland ===
- Hill 16, Dublin, Ireland, popular during Gaelic football matches

=== South Africa ===
- The Hill, Gauteng, a suburb of Johannesburg, South Africa

=== United Kingdom ===
- Hill Top, Cumbria, England
- The Hill, Cumbria, England, a village in Millom Without
- The Hill, a commonly used nickname for Knockhill Racing Circuit in Fife, Scotland

=== United States ===
- The Hill, drive up California State Route 17 to San Jose, California area
- The Hill, alternative name for Mokelumne Hill, California
- The Hill, Boulder, a neighborhood and retail district in Boulder, Colorado
- The Hill, New Haven, a neighborhood in New Haven, Connecticut
- The Hill, a section of Chicago Heights, Illinois that is primarily Latino
- The Hill, an NRHP building in Chestnut Hill, Massachusetts
- The Hill, a nickname for Tower Hill Park in Minneapolis, Minnesota
- The Hill, St. Louis, a historically Italian-American neighborhood in St. Louis, Missouri
- The Hill, what some people referred to Los Alamos, New Mexico as during World War II
- The Hill, a nickname for Chapel Hill, North Carolina
- The Hill, a distinctive grass-seating area of the student section at InfoCision Stadium–Summa Field at the University of Akron, Ohio
- The Hill, a nickname for the Allison Hill neighborhood of Harrisburg, Pennsylvania
- The Hill, a nickname for The Hill District, a neighborhood of Pittsburgh, Pennsylvania
- The Hill, a distinctive grass-seating area of Memorial Stadium, Clemson, South Carolina
- The Hill, Knoxville, an academic area of the University of Tennessee Knoxville
- The Hill, a distinctive grass-seating area of Scott Stadium, Charlottesville, Virginia
- The Hill, a nickname for Capitol Hill, Seattle, Washington

==== American institutions ====
- United States Congress, by metonymy from Capitol Hill in Washington, D.C., site of the United States Capitol
- The Hill School, a private boarding school in Pottstown, Pennsylvania
- Cornell University, Ithaca, New York
- Hamilton College, Clinton, New York
- University of Arkansas campus in Fayetteville, Arkansas
- University of Michigan, a neighborhood of dormitories in Ann Arbor, Michigan
- United States Air Force Academy, Colorado Springs, Colorado
- Washington and Lee University, Lexington, Virginia
- Warrenton Training Center Station B, a Central Intelligence Agency facility near Warrenton, Virginia

== Books and media ==
- The Hill (newspaper), est. 1994, a daily newspaper covering the U.S. Congress and American politics in general
- The Hill, a 1905 school novel by Horace Annesley Vachell
- T. H. E. Hill (born 1948), contemporary American author
- The location of the home of Bilbo Baggins and Frodo Baggins in the writings of J. R. R. Tolkien

== Films and television ==
- The Hill (1965 film), a prison drama war film, starring Sean Connery, Ian Hendry, Ian Bannen, and Michael Redgrave.
- The Hill (TV series), a 2006 Sundance Channel documentary TV series
- The urban neighborhood that is the center of action in the American television series, Hill Street Blues
- Hill TV, a website for The Hill YouTube channel associated with the newspaper
- The Hill (2023 film), a biographical sports drama film

== Music ==
- The Hill (band), a band that recorded an album with Chris Farlowe
- The Hill (Richard Buckner album)
- The Hill (Travis Greene album)
- The Hill (David Murray album)

== Other ==
- The Hill, a colloquialism for a pitcher's mound in baseball

== See also ==
- Capitol Hill (disambiguation)
- Hill (disambiguation)
- Viscount Hill, Richard 'The Great Hill', diplomat
- The Hills (disambiguation)
- The Mount (disambiguation)
- The Mountain (disambiguation)
