= Bay Horse, Blossom Street =

Listed pub in York, England

Bay Horse
- The pub in 2025
- Interactive map of the Bay Horse area
- Alternative names: Bay Horse Inn

General information
- Type: Public house
- Location: 55 Blossom Street, York, England
- Coordinates: 53°57′15″N 1°5′36″W
- Year built: Late 17th century
- Renovated: Mid-18th century (added); Early and mid-19th century (altered); 20th century (altered)
- Owner: Stonegate

Design and construction
- Designations

Listed Building – Grade II
- Official name: Bay Horse Inn
- Designated: 1 July 1968
- Reference no.: 1259498

The Bay Horse is a public house on Blossom Street, immediately west of the city centre of York, England.

The core of the building was constructed in the late 17th century, after the Siege of York, as a small farmhouse. It was first recorded as an inn in 1748, around which time it was raised to three storeys, and extended from an L-plan to a square plan. It is now a three-bay building, built of brick, with a rendered front and a parapet that disguises the tiled roof. The staircase dates from the mid-18th century, and there are some fittings from the Regency period.

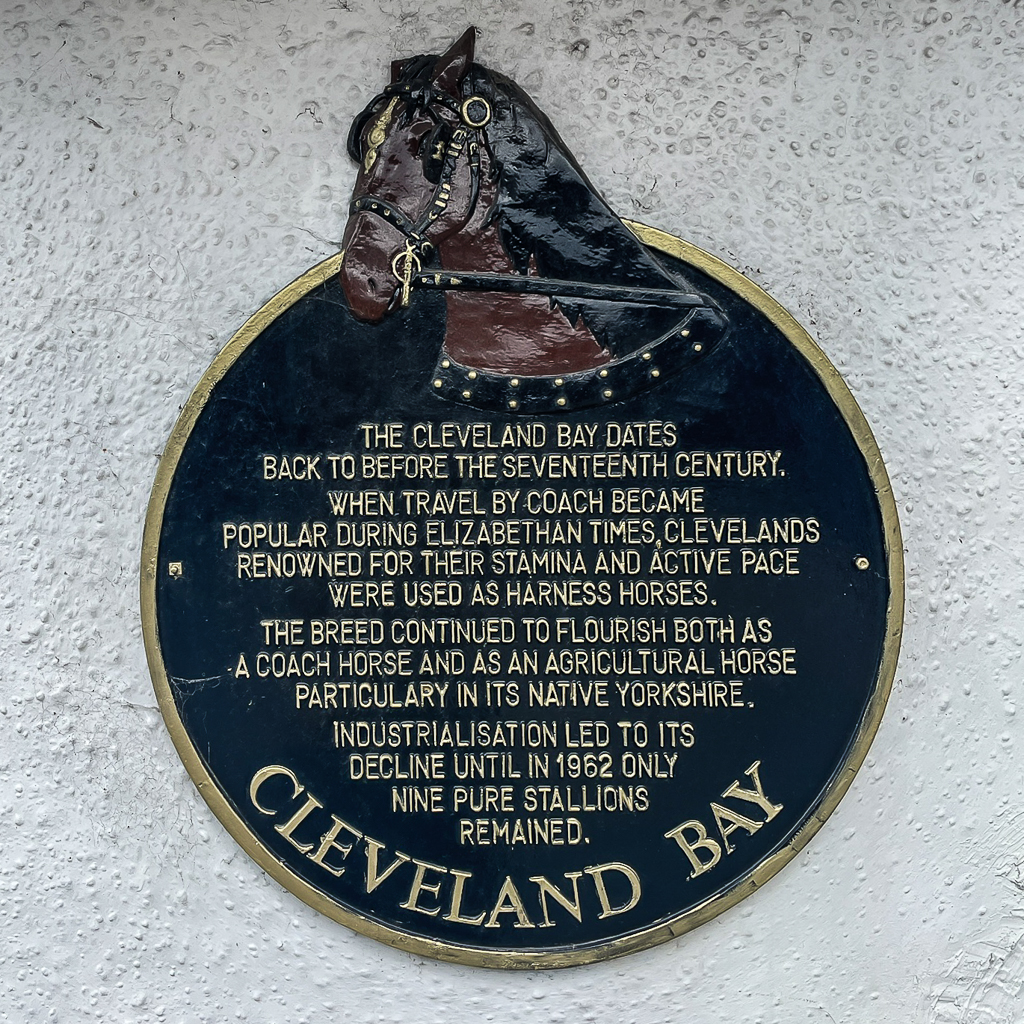
The commemorative plaque

By 1798, the inn was named the "Bay Horse". The name is believed to refer to the horse Bay Malton, who won a major race nearby at York Racecourse. Some of the windows were altered in the 19th century. From 1862 until 1874, the pub and its brewhouse were owned by the Institute of the Blessed Virgin Mary. By 1969, the pub was owned by John Smith's Brewery, which restored the ground floor, reusing some of the Victorian fittings. As of August 2026, the freehold is owned by Stonegate Pub Company.

== See also ==
- Listed buildings in York (outside the city walls, southern part)
