= Mount =

Mount is often used as part of the name of specific mountains, e.g. Mount Everest.

Mount or Mounts may also refer to:

== Places ==
- Mount, Cornwall, a village in Warleggan parish, England
- Mount, Perranzabuloe, a hamlet in Perranzabuloe parish, Cornwall, England

== People ==
- Mount (surname)
- William L. Mounts (1862–1929), American lawyer and politician

== Computing and software ==
- Mount (computing), the process of making a file system accessible
- Mount (Unix), the utility in Unix-like operating systems which mounts file systems

== Displays and equipment ==
- Mount, a fixed point for attaching equipment, such as a hardpoint on an airframe
- Mounting board, in picture framing
- Mount, a hanging scroll for mounting paintings
- Mount, to display an item on a heavy backing such as foamcore, e.g.:
  - To pin a biological specimen, on a heavy backing in a stretched stable position for ease of dissection or display
  - To prepare dead animals for display in taxidermy
- Lens mount, an interface used to fix a lens to a camera
- Mounting, placing a cover slip on a specimen on a microscopic slide
- Telescope mount, a device used to support a telescope
- Weapon mount, equipment used to secure an armament
- Picture mount

== Sports ==
- Mount (grappling), a grappling position
- Mount, to board an apparatus used for gymnastics, such as a balance beam

== Other uses ==
- Mount!, a 2016 novel by Jilly Cooper
- Mount, in copulation, the union of the sex organs in mating
- Mount, a riding animal
- Mount, or Vahana, an animal or mythical entity closely associated with a particular deity in Hindu mythology
- Mount, to add butter to a sauce in order to thicken it, as with beurre monté

== See also ==
- The Mount (disambiguation)
- Mountain (disambiguation)
- Massif (disambiguation)
- Hill (disambiguation)
