= Blossom Street =

Street in York, England

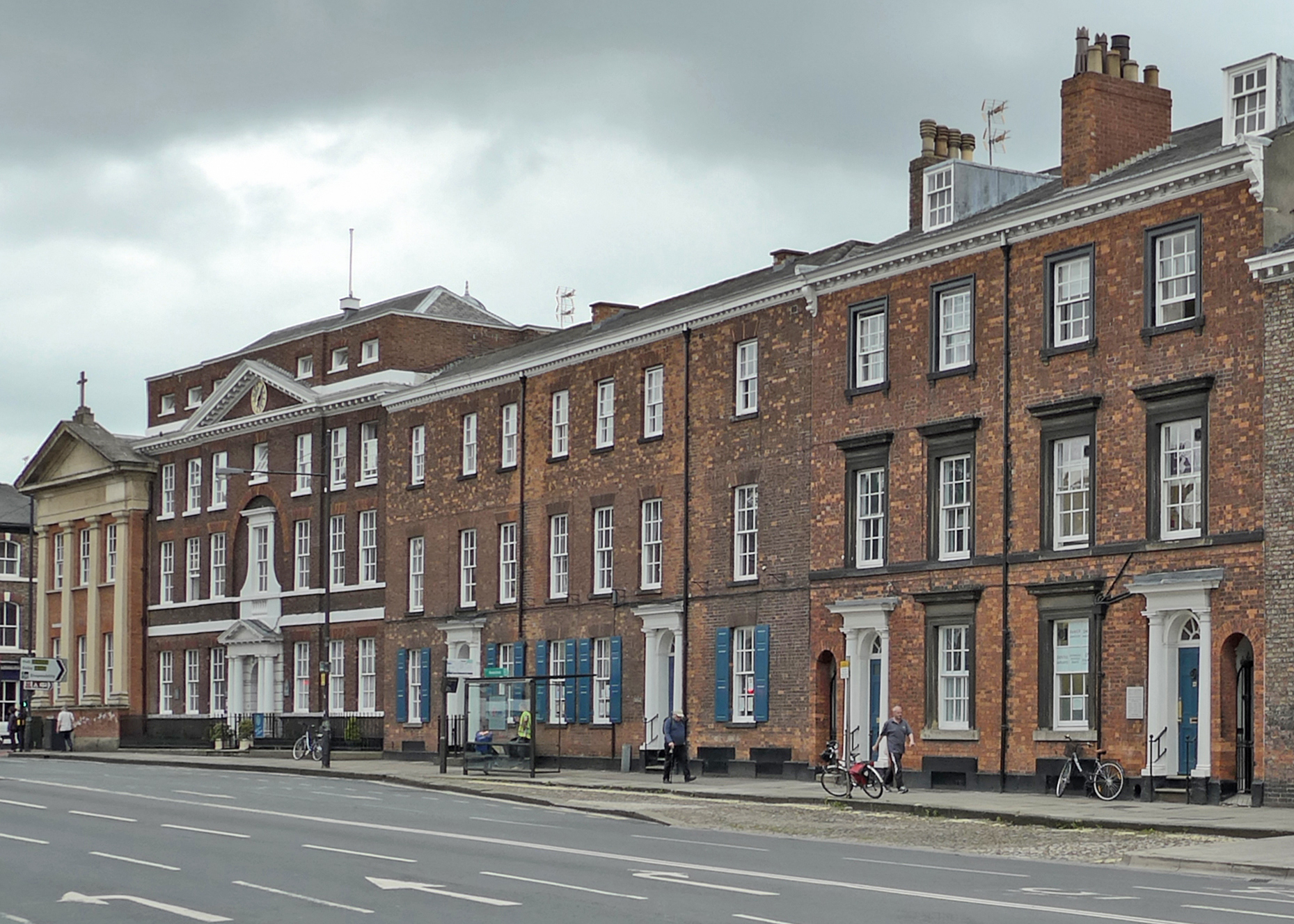
- Looking north-east on Blossom Street
- Location within York
- Former name: Ploxswaingate
- Location: York, England
- Postal code: YO
- Coordinates: 53.9550°N 1.0921°W
- North east end: Micklegate
- Major junctions: Nunnery Lane; Queen Street
- South west end: The Mount; Holgate Road; East Mount Road

Blossom Street is a road in York, England, immediately west of the city centre.

== History ==
The street has been the main route leading south and west from York from the Roman Eboracum era onwards; the Roman roads to Calcaria (now Tadcaster) and Isurium Brigantum (now Aldborough, North Yorkshire) ran parallel to the modern road, to the rear of the buildings on its north-western side. While the area was initially agricultural, it was later used as a rubbish dump, and then as a cemetery. Remains of several tombs have been found. By the 5th century, it appears to have been used as agricultural land once more.

The street was first recorded in the early 13th century, as Ploxswaingate, named for the ploughswains living in the area, and by 1282, 29 plots along the street had already been built upon. Unlike other streets in medieval York, it was extremely wide, and as a result, a horse and cattle market was held on it. By 1639 there were 68 houses on the street, and although there was some damage during the 1644 Siege of York, the presence of a nearby Royalist camp meant it was the only suburb of the city to escape complete destruction.

From the medieval period, the street was known for its inns, mixed with smaller merchants' houses and farmhouses belonging to people who put cows out to pasture on the Knavesmire. Barstow's Hospital was built in the 17th century, and from the 1820s it became built up with larger houses and shops. The last horse fair on the street was held in about 1906, by which time it had become an important tram and bus route. It is now a mixed commercial area, with shops, restaurants, hotels and some housing, although it is dominated by traffic.

== Layout and architecture ==
The street is the continuation of Micklegate. It runs south-west from Micklegate Bar, through a major crossroads with Queen Street and Nunnery Lane. On its south-east side are several terraced streets: St Mary's Court, South Parade, Moss Street and Shaw's Terrace; while only The Crescent leads off its north-west side. Past its junction with Holgate Road and East Mount Road, it continues as The Mount.

Notable buildings on the north-east side include Nos. 2–10, a terrace built around 1863; the Windmill Inn at Nos. 14–16, with late-17th-century origins; Nos. 22–26, built in 1789 by John Horner and used for much of the 20th century as the York Railwaymen's Club; and the Everyman Cinema, designed by Harry Weedon in 1936.

On the south-west side lie No. 3, a former school built in 1853; The Punch Bowl pub at Nos. 5–9; the Grade I-listed Bar Convent at No. 17, the oldest Catholic convent in England; Nos. 19–21, dating from 1760, but with some earlier material; the mid-19th-century Nos. 23–25; No. 27, built around 1840; No. 29, from about 1820; the mid-19th-century Nos. 31–33 and No. 35; No. 39 and No. 43, built in the 1820s; and the Bay Horse pub at No. 55, dating back to the 17th century.

== Gallery ==
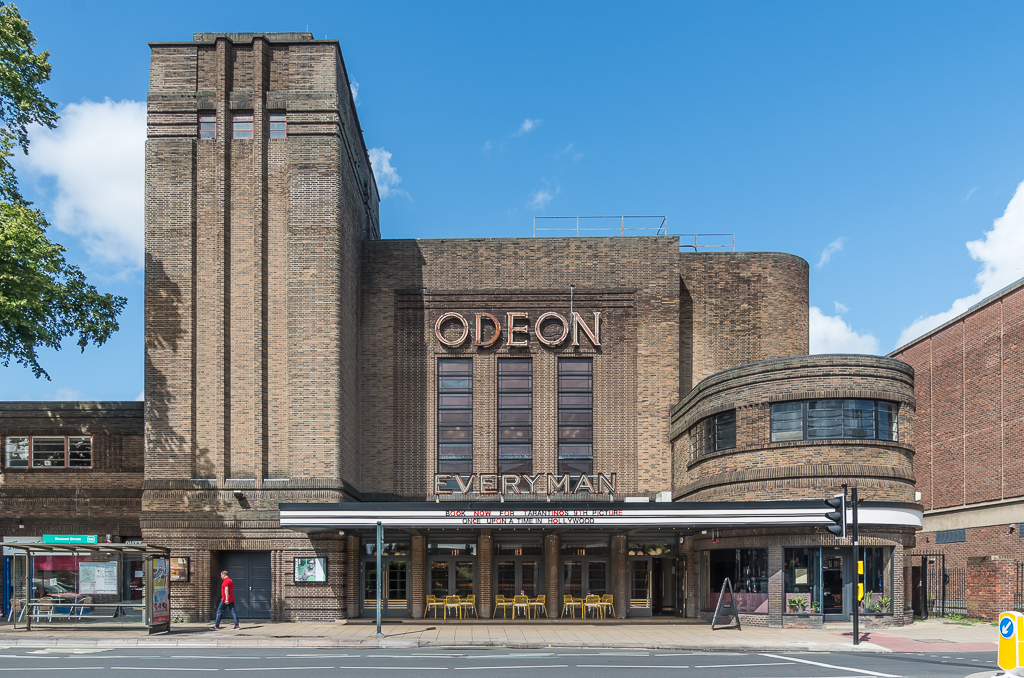
Everyman Cinema

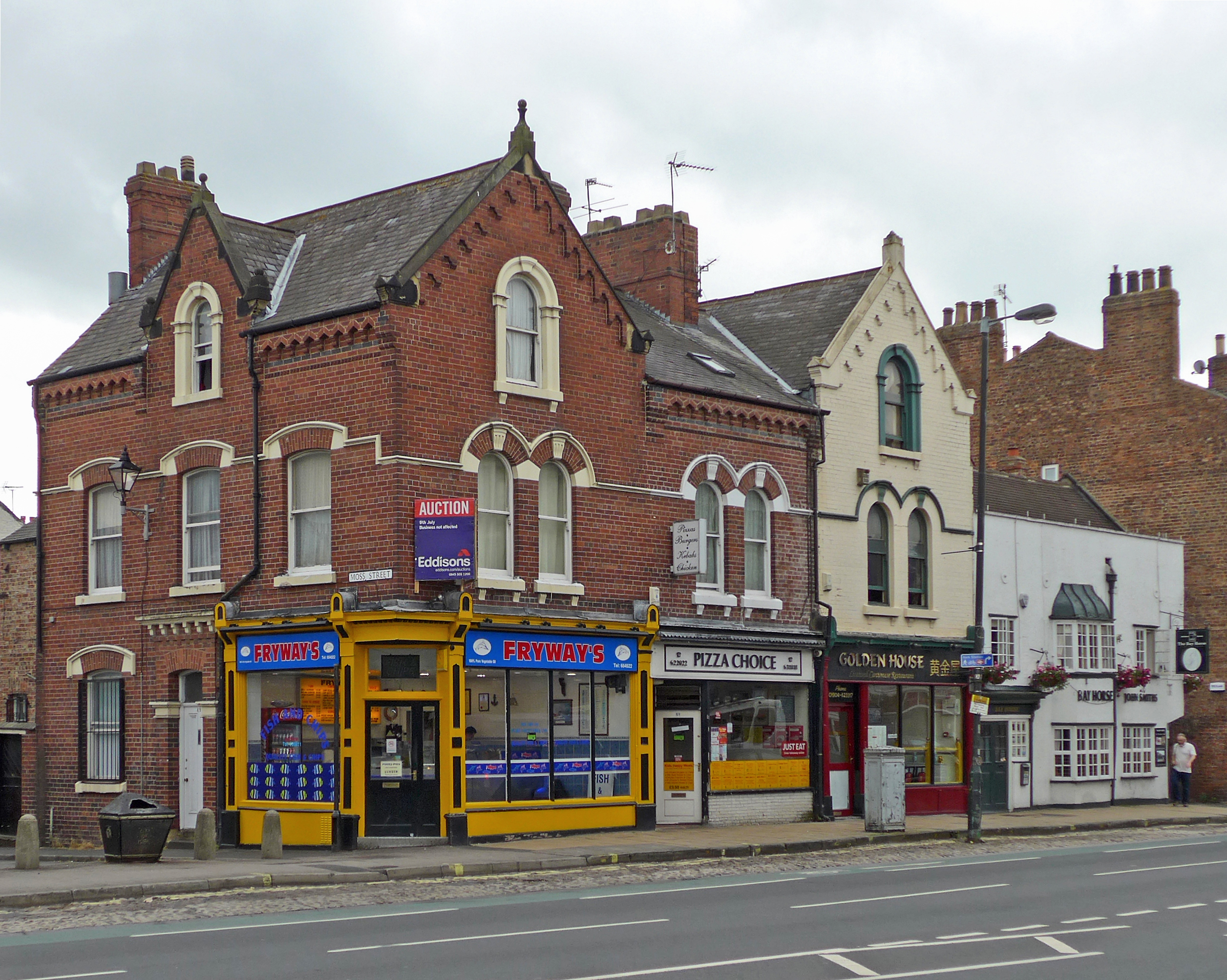
Various fast-food restaurants

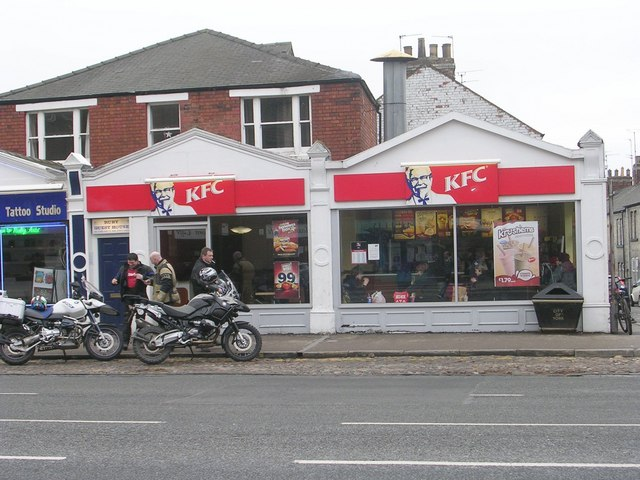
Kentucky Fried Chicken

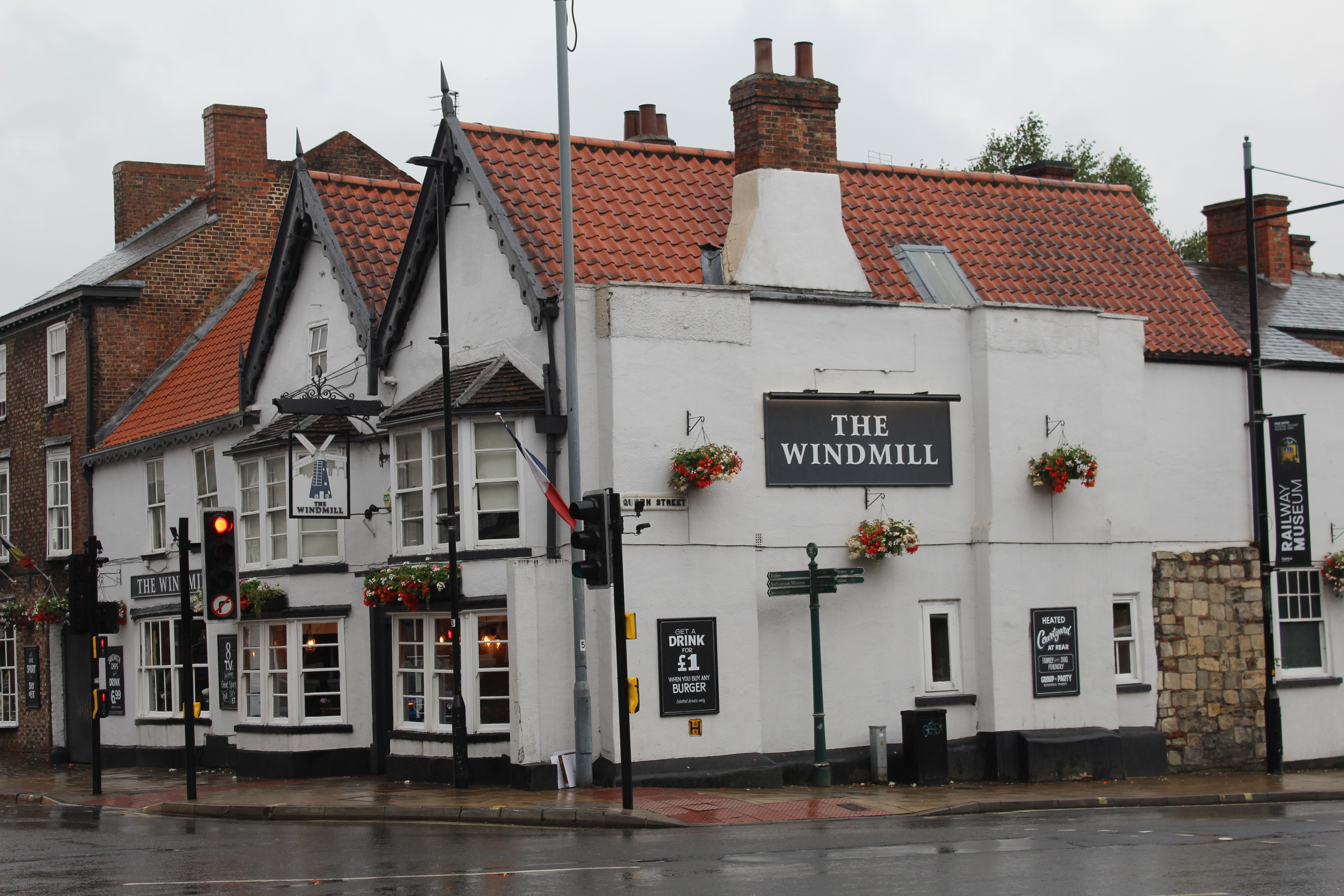
The Windmill

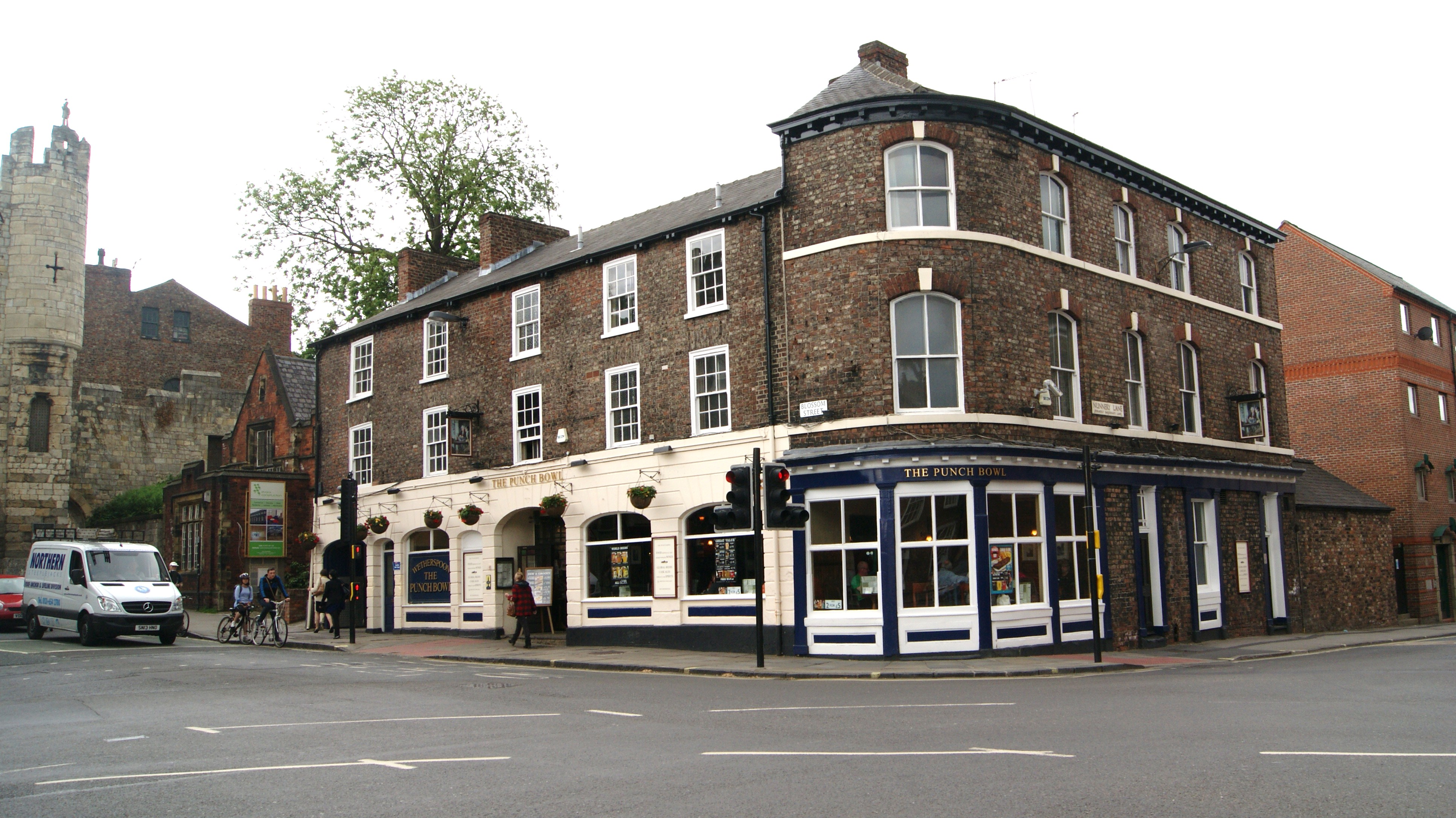
The Punch Bowl

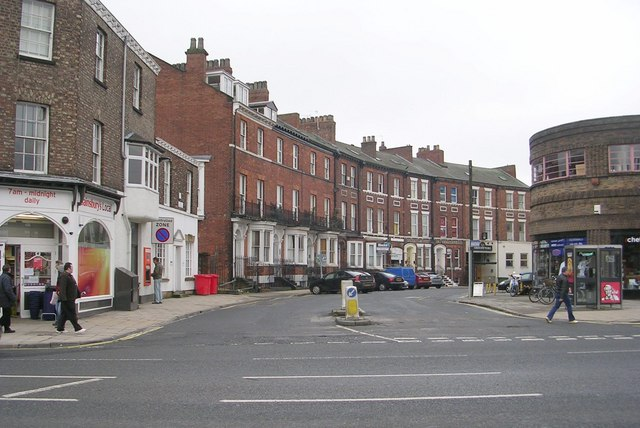
The Crescent
