= The Mount (hospital) =

- Leeds and York Partnership NHS Foundation Trust
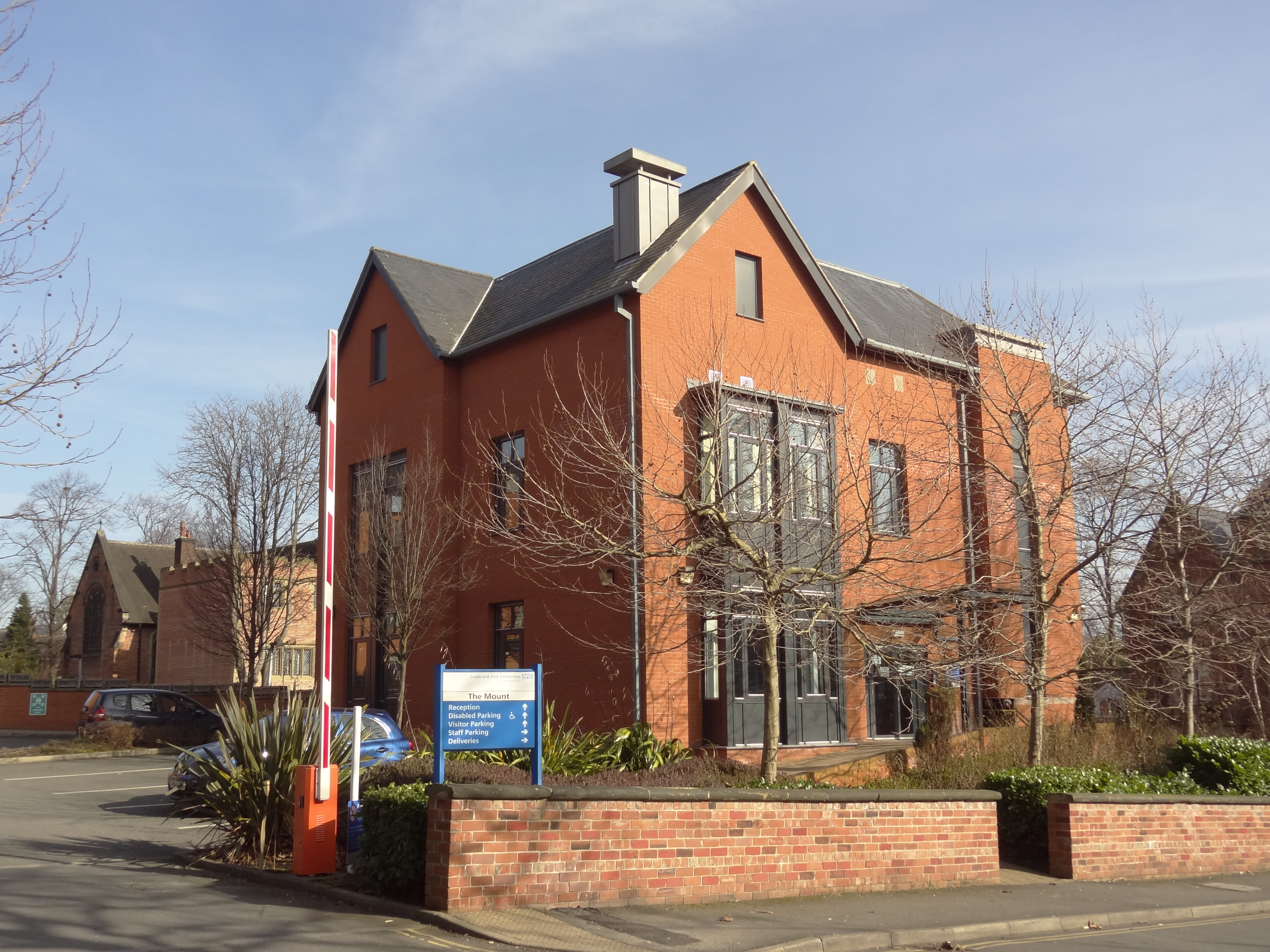

- Shown in West Yorkshire

Geography
- Location: Leeds, West Yorkshire, England, United Kingdom
- Coordinates: 53.804°N 1.559°W

Organisation
- Care system: NHS
- Type: Mental health hospital

Services
- Emergency department: No Accident & Emergency

Links
- Website: www.leedsandyorkpft.nhs.uk
- Lists: Hospitals in England

The Mount is a psychiatric hospital based in Hyde Terrace, Leeds. It is managed by Leeds and York Partnership NHS Foundation Trust.

== History ==
The hospital, which was established to replace the services provided for older people at High Royds Hospital, was designed by GWP Architecture and opened in a modern purpose-built facility in 2003. Free Wi-Fi is provided in four of its wards, together with tablet computers for patients and their carers to use to help pass the time.

The hospital has 29 beds for dementia patients and 44 for mental health patients.
