= The Mount, York (pub) =

Listed pub in York, England

The Mount
- The pub in 2023
- Former names: The Saddle

General information
- Type: Public house
- Location: 72 The Mount, York, England
- Coordinates: 53.9539°N 1.0942°W
- Year built: c. 1870; 156 years ago
- Renovated: Late 19th century (refronted) c. 2011 (refurbished)
- Owner: Marston's

Design and construction
- Designations

Listed Building – Grade II
- Official name: The Mount public house
- Designated: 21 April 1994
- Reference no.: 1256445

The Mount is a Grade II listed public house on The Mount in York, England. The present building is dated to around 1870, with its frontage described in the listing as later 19th century. In 1892 the property was purchased by John Smith's. The site was included in the Central Historic Core conservation area in 1968. The date at which Marston's acquired the pub is not published, but as of December 2025 the company owns the freehold.

== History ==
A drinking house is recorded on the site from 1838, trading as The Saddle. The present building is dated to around 1870, a period when the earlier name may still have been in use, and the frontage is described in the listing as later 19th century. Other sources state that the premises were rebuilt in 1891, which may correspond to this later phase. In 1892 the property was purchased by John Smith's Brewery, which renamed it The Mount.

In 1968 the site was included within the newly established Central Historic Core conservation area, and on 14 March 1997, The Mount was designated a Grade II listed building.

The date at which Marston's acquired the pub is not published, but the company invested in the building around 2011, refurbishing it following a period of decline. As of December 2025, the freehold is owned by Marston's.

== Architecture ==
Pub sign in 2020

The building is constructed of white brick, with simple timber detailing to the frontage, and has gabled ends with stone copings and brick chimneys on a slate roof. It has three storeys and three bays. The front is set between plain vertical strips topped with shaped capitals, supporting a broad horizontal band and a pronounced cornice that rises into a small gable above the doorway. The blocks at each end, and the one between them, are also gabled and decorated with shallow carved foliage. The central doorway has glazed panels.

The ground‑floor windows form an arcade, set above moulded panels and topped with round arches carried on slim columns with shaped capitals. On the upper floors, the outer bays project slightly as two‑storey canted bays, each containing single‑pane sash windows set back into the wall. These windows have panelled bases and moulded cornices. The second‑floor windows have shallow curved heads with keyblocks. The middle window on the first floor is a single‑pane sash with a shaped, gabled lintel decorated with carved foliage; the second‑floor centre window has a similar shaped lintel. All have painted stone sills. The roofline is marked by an ornate brick cornice with stepped corbelling.

== See also ==
- Listed buildings in York (outside the city walls, southern part)
