= High Royds Hospital =

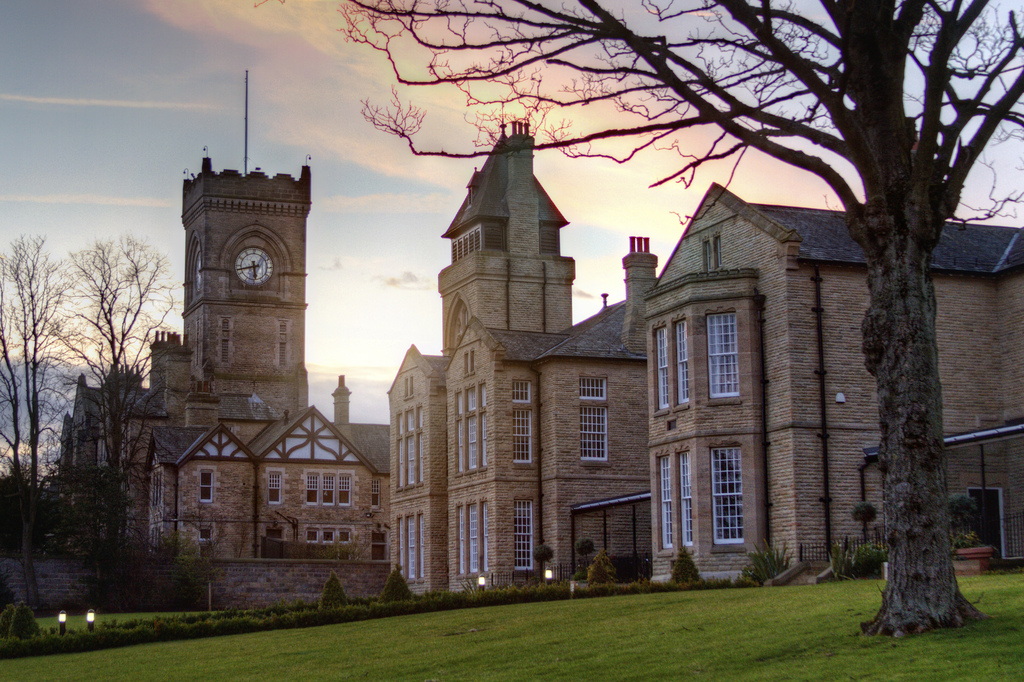
- High Royds Hospital, as seen in February 2012 beside the recently converted Ramsgill and Amerdale wards on the building's southern facade

- Location within West Yorkshire

Geography
- Location: Menston, West Yorkshire, England
- Coordinates: 53.8818°N 1.7347°W

Organisation
- Care system: NHS
- Type: Mental health

Services
- Beds: 240

History
- Founded: 1885
- Closed: 2003

Links
- Lists: Hospitals in England

High Royds Hospital is a former psychiatric hospital south of the village of Menston, West Yorkshire, England. The hospital, which opened in 1888, closed in 2003 and the site has since been developed for residential use.

== History ==
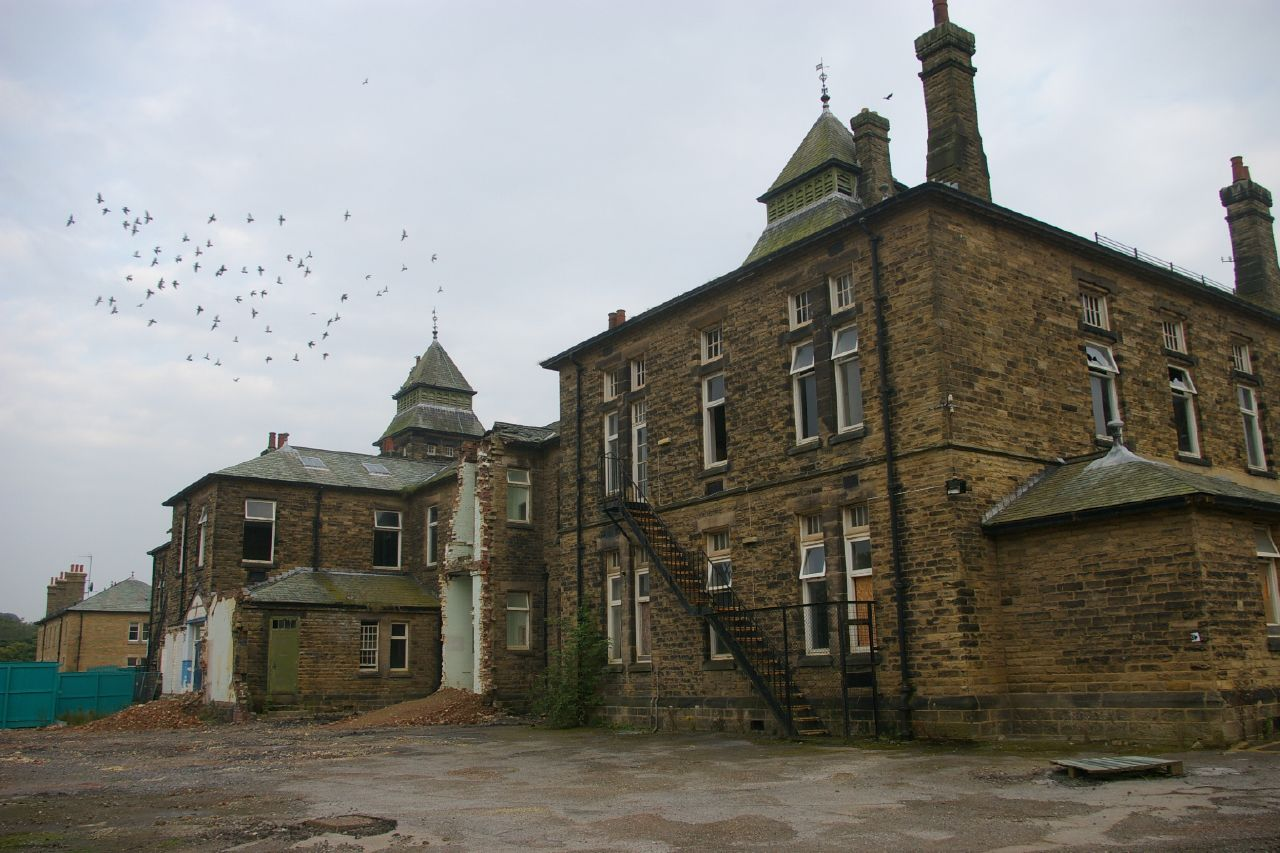
High Royds Hospital in a state of decay in 2006

The 300-acre (120-hectare) estate on which the asylum was built was purchased by the West Riding Justices for £18,000 in 1885. The hospital was designed on the broad arrow plan by architect J. Vickers Edwards and the large gothic complex of stone buildings was formally opened as the West Riding Pauper Lunatic Asylum on 8 October 1888.

The administration building, which is Grade II listed, features an Italian mosaic floor in the main corridor which is intricately decorated with the Yorkshire Rose and black daisies - the latter of which provided inspiration for the title of Black Daisies, a television screenplay filmed at High Royds which took as its subject the experiences of sufferers of Alzheimer's disease.

The hospital was intended to be largely self-sufficient, and had its own library, surgery, dispensary, butchery, dairies, bakery, shop, upholster's and cobbler's workshops and a large estate partly devoted to agriculture and market gardening. The patients lived in wards and if they were able, were expected to work towards their keep either on the farm, in the kitchens or laundry, or in various handicraft facilities. The hospital was formerly connected to the Wharfedale railway line by its own small railway system, the High Royds Hospital Railway, but this was closed in 1951.

The report into the abuse committed by Jimmy Savile notes that he had carried out instances of abuse at High Royds Hospital in the 1980s. The report said that the assault was during a fancy dress fun run at the hospital and that the witness was credible and accepted the allegation as true. It was also alleged that Saville groped not only patients but also staff from the hospital and a porter was asked if there was a room that Savile could go to if "he pulled one of the nurses".

In its final years of operation, High Royds become outdated and unsuited to modern psychiatric practice. This was acknowledged by the chief executive of Leeds Mental Health in 1999 after complaints from consultants about violence and cramped conditions on the wards. After services were transferred to St James' Hospital and the Mount, High Royds Hospital closed in 2003.

In June 2017 a planning application was submitted to convert the administration block and workshops for residential use. The residential development is called Chevin Park. The final stage of redevelopment began in March 2019 with the conversion of the clock tower. The former ballroom is now a residents lounge.

== High Royds in popular culture ==
Since its closure, the site has been used as a film set for the film Asylum, as well as for the successful television series No Angels, Bodies, Fat Friends, Heartbeat and The Royal.

The drama Diamond Geezer starring David Jason which aired on ITV1 in March 2005 was also partly shot at High Royds.

Leeds band Kaiser Chiefs have written a song ("Highroyds") about the former hospital. Three of the band (Nick Hodgson, Nick 'Peanut' Baines and Simon Rix) used to attend St. Mary's Catholic High School, the school that faces High Royds Hospital.

The hospital was the focus of a 2010 Open University documentary about asylums called Mental:A history of the Madhouse.

Anna Hope's novel The Ballroom is set in the asylum in 1911.

Ross Farrally, a local historian from Leeds, published three books that delve into the history of the hospital through personal accounts. All three publications include interviews with former staff, patients and their families. His insight and knowledge offers a glimpse into the former Victorian hospital between 1949 and 2003.

== See also ==
- Listed buildings in Guiseley and Rawdon
