= The Mount (York) =

Street in York, England

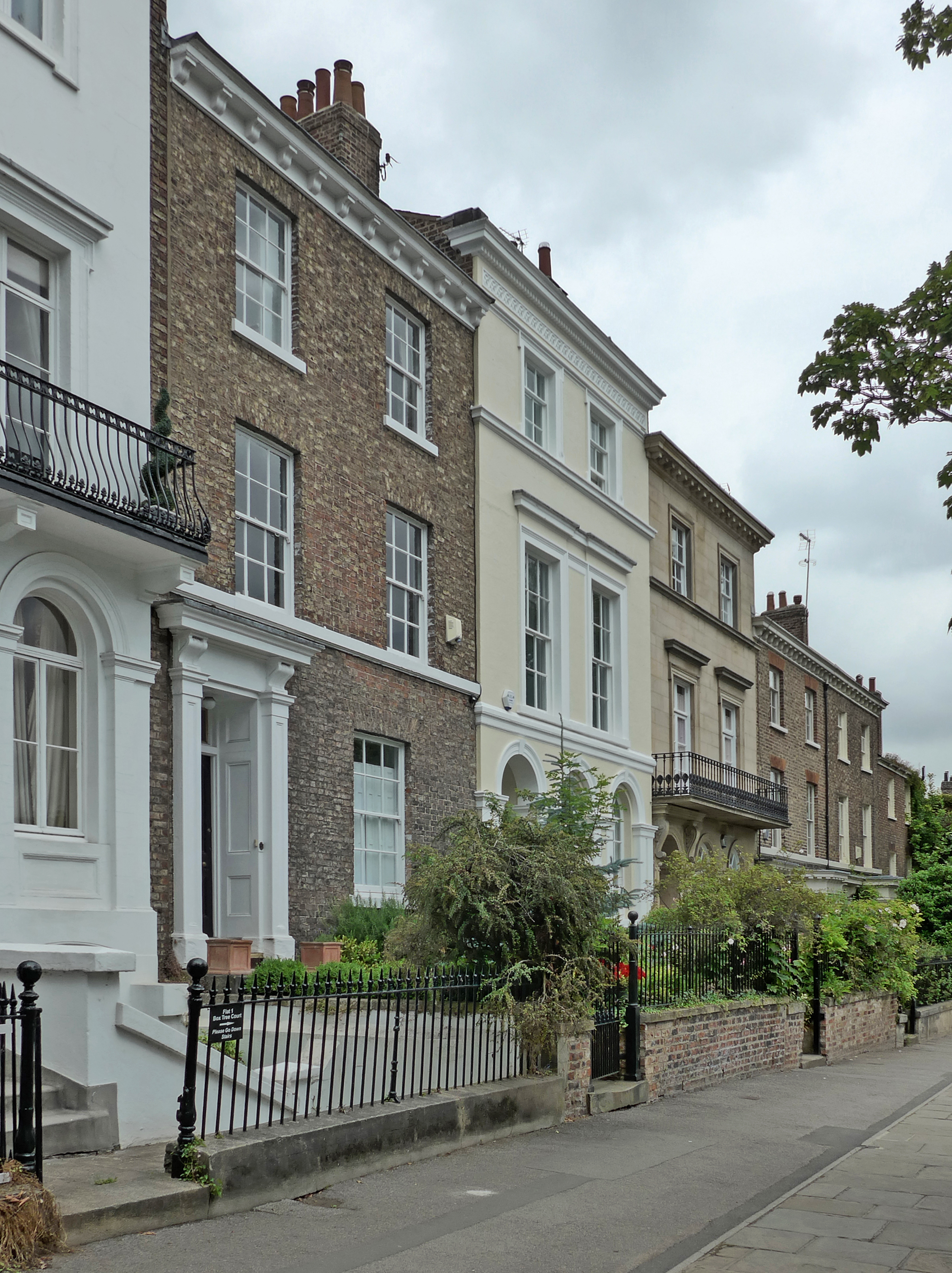
- Looking north-west on The Mount
- Location within York
- Location: York, England
- Postal code: YO
- Coordinates: 53.9519°N 1.0966°W
- North east end: Blossom Street; Holgate Road; East Mount Road
- Major junctions: Scarcroft Road; Dalton Terrace
- South west end: Mount Vale; Trentholme Drive

The Mount is a street in York, England, running south-west from the city centre.

== History ==
The street has been part of the main route running south and west from York from the Roman Eboracum area onwards. The Roman road to Calcaria (now Tadcaster) and on to Londinium (London) ran immediately north-west of the current line of the street. Around the street, the area was used for burials and cremations. During the medieval period, it the area was largely agricultural. In the 12th century, a chapel dedicated to Saint James was built on the street, near its current junction with Mill Mount, and in the 14th century, St Katherine's Hospital was constructed near the street's junction with Holgate Road.

At the start of the English Civil War, an earthwork was constructed at what is now the street's junction with Albemarle Road. This saw service during the Siege of York, but was later levelled. It is believed that it the name of the street refers to this earthwork. In the late 17th century, there was a windmill on the street.

In the 19th century, the street was built up with large houses. On the north-west side of the street are numerous trees. There was formerly a grass margin, used as grazing for cattle on their way to the city's market, but around 1800 they were replaced with cobbles, which survive and are now used for parking.

== Layout and architecture ==
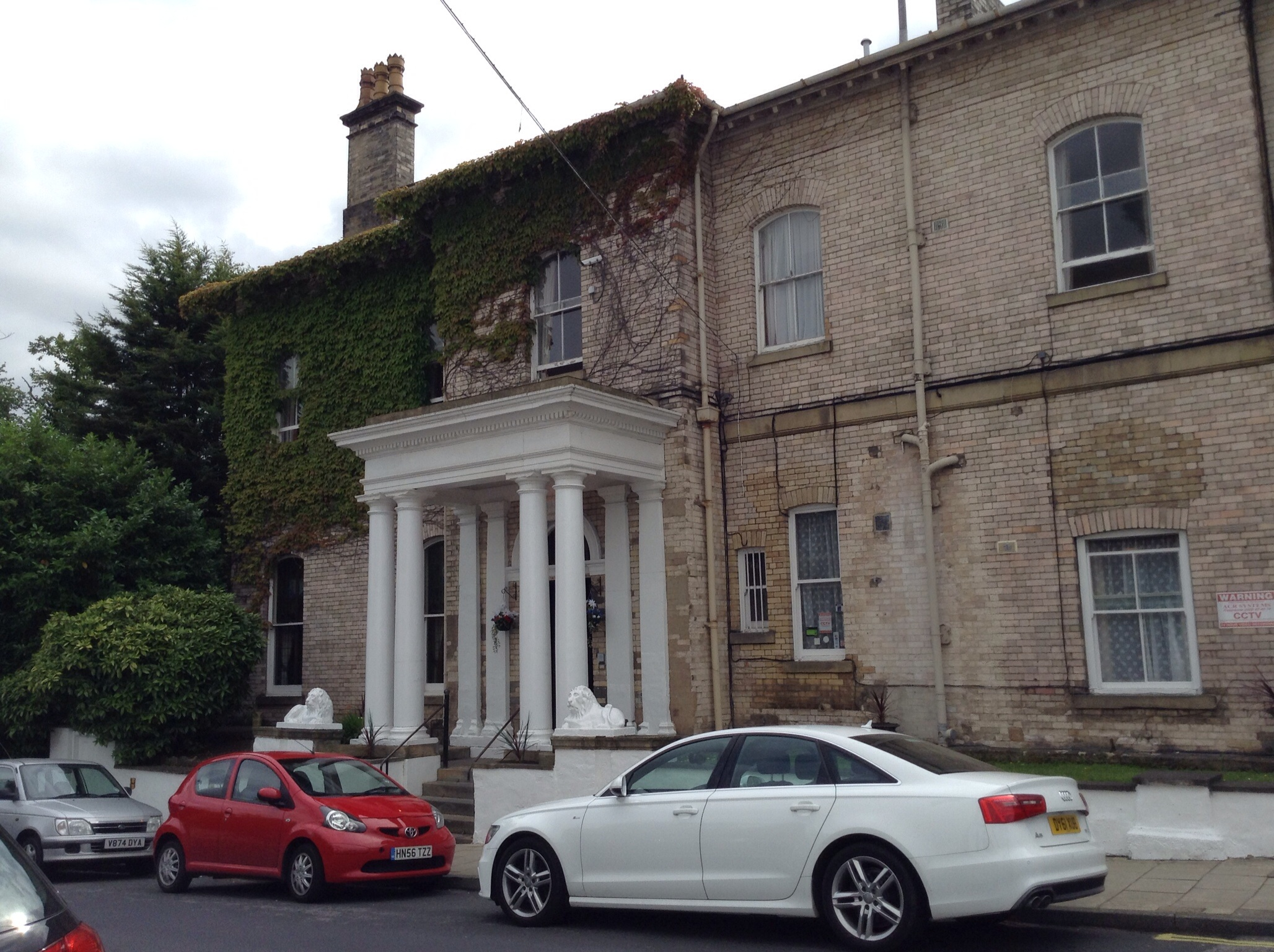
The Elmbank Hotel

The street continues the line of Blossom Street, running south-west away from York city centre, and itself continues as Mount Vale. The house numbering is continuous along all three stretches of road. The Mount starts at a junction with Holgate Road and East Mount Road. Park Street, Scarcroft Road, Mill Mount and Albemarle Road lead off its south-eastern side, while Mount Parade, Dalton Terrace, Driffield Terrace and St Aubyn's Place lead off its north-western side. It ends at a junction with Trentholme Drive. Many of the side streets contain terraces of smaller 19th-century housing.

Most of the buildings on the street are listed. On the south-east side, these include Nos. 63–67; No. 69; No. 71; Nos. 73–75; the Abbey Park Hotel at Nos. 77–79; and No. 89, all of which are early-19th century. Further out, No. 107 is mid-19th century; while Nos. 117–119; No. 121; the Ambassador Hotel; and No. 127 all date from the early 1830s.

On the north-west side lies a terrace consisting of The Mount pub, dating from about 1870; the late-17th-century Nos. 82–86; the mid-19th-century No. 90; Nos. 92–94, built in 1821; Nos. 96–98, from the 1830s; Nos. 100–104, built in 1808; houses of the 1840s at No. 116, No. 118, No. 120, No. 122, No. 124, No. 126, and No. 128; No. 130, and No. 132, built in the 1820s; and the mid-19th-century No. 134. The terrace at Nos. 136–144 dates from 1824; and No. 150 is from the 1860s. The Elmbank Hotel, dating from 1870, is the sole Grade II*-listed building on the street.
