= High Royds Hospital Railway =

Closed railway in Yorkshire, England

Coordinates: 53.88547°N 1.73087°W

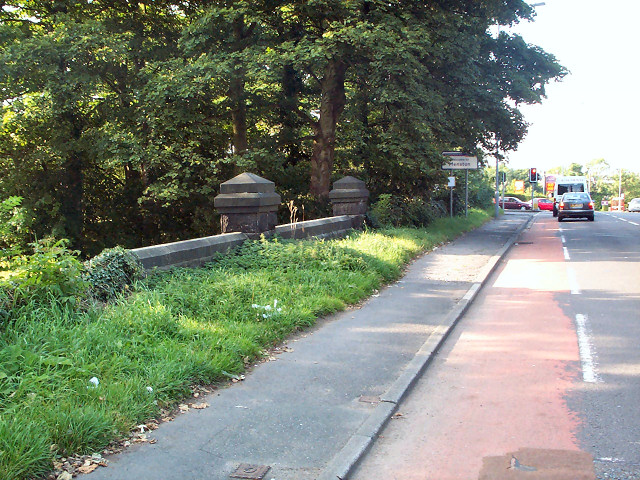
- Looking north on the A65 at Menston. The bridge on the left carries the road over the former railway. Both portals have been filled in

Overview
- Status: Closed
- Owner: High Royds Hospital
- Locale: West Yorkshire
- Termini: Menston; High Royds Hospital (West Riding Pauper Lunatic Asylum)

Service
- Type: Private Line
- Operator(s): High Royds Hospital

History
- Opened: 1883
- Closed: 1951

Technical
- Line length: 0.5 miles
- Number of tracks: 1
- Track gauge: 4 ft 8 1/2 in (1,435 mm)
- Electrification: 110 V DC

The High Royds Hospital Railway was a short railway connecting the West Riding County Asylum near Leeds in West Yorkshire with the Midland Railway line between Menston and Guiseley on the Otley and Ilkley Joint Railway (nowadays the Wharfedale Line). The line opened in 1883 and ran for just over 0.5 miles (0.8 km), it was constructed to 4 ft 8 1/2 in (1,435 mm) standard gauge and was a single line throughout. The line closed in the 1930s in the face of road competition and increasing maintenance costs but reopened again in 1939 when the outbreak of war led to a fuel shortage for road transport. Final closure came in 1951.

== Usage ==
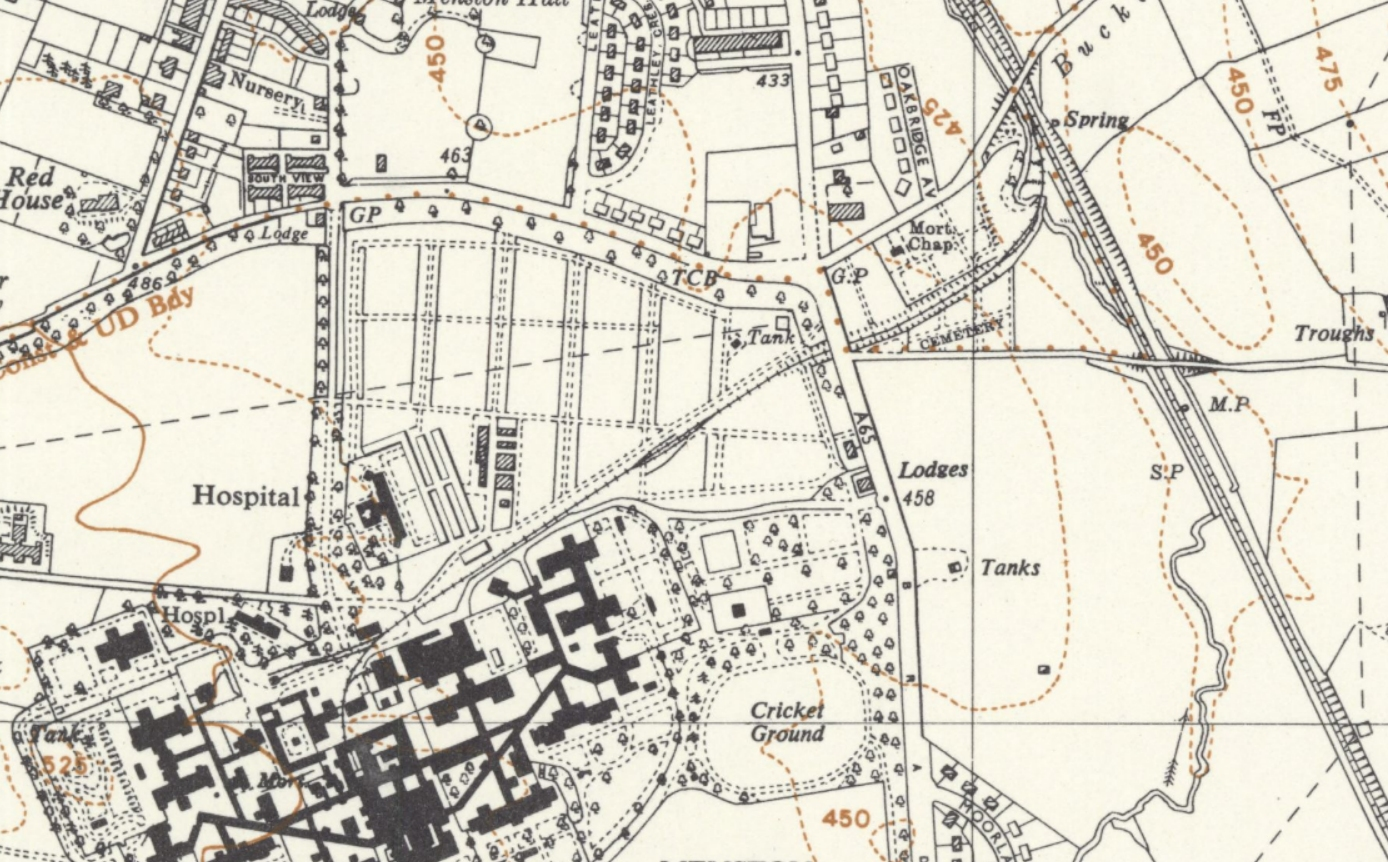
1956 Ordnance Survey map showing the railway and its connection to the main line

The line was originally built to supply building materials during the construction of the hospital and later for the carriage of supplies such as flour and mostly coal for fuel in the hospital boilers. Coal wagons arriving at the hospital discharged in coal hoppers under the railway and any coal that did not empty by gravity had to be unloaded by hand, this was normally a job for male patients of the hospital.

The railway company would leave loaded wagons on siding beside the main line and collect empties from the same. Movement of the wagons between the siding and the hospital was carried out by the hospital.

== Motive power ==
When the line first opened a small steam engine was purchased by the hospital board but it proved to be underpowered and was prone to slipping on the severe gradient up from the main line. In 1897 the board decided to electrify the line and an overhead line system was installed. An electric locomotive was brought in but again proved to be underpowered and could only manage to haul one loaded coal wagon up the gradient. A more powerful electric locomotive was brought in as a replacement in the 1920s and was used until the line closed in the 1930s and the subsequent wartime reopening.

== Gallery ==
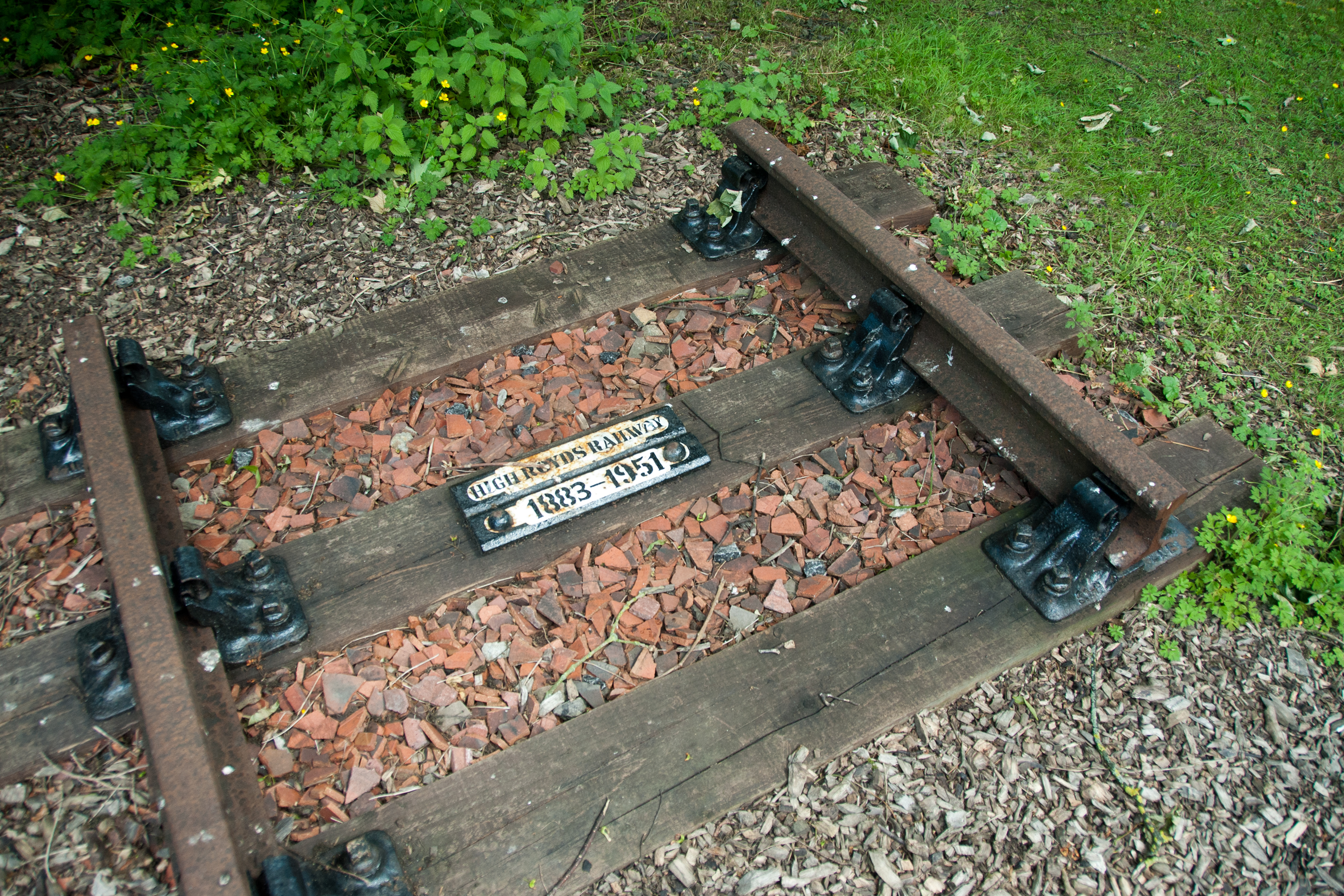
Former High Royds Hospital Railway trackbed with commemorative section of track

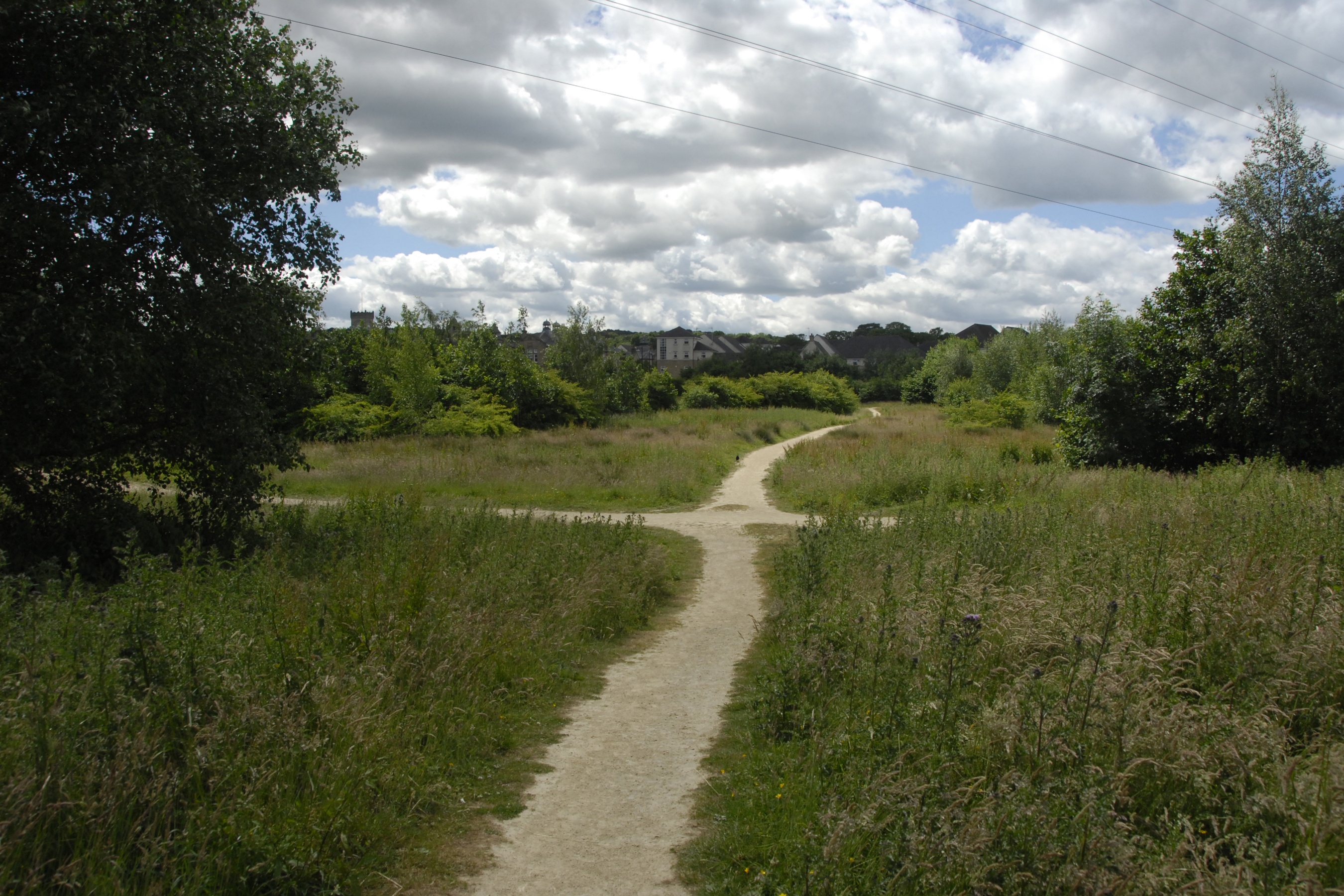
Looking west from the A65 along the former railway trackbed

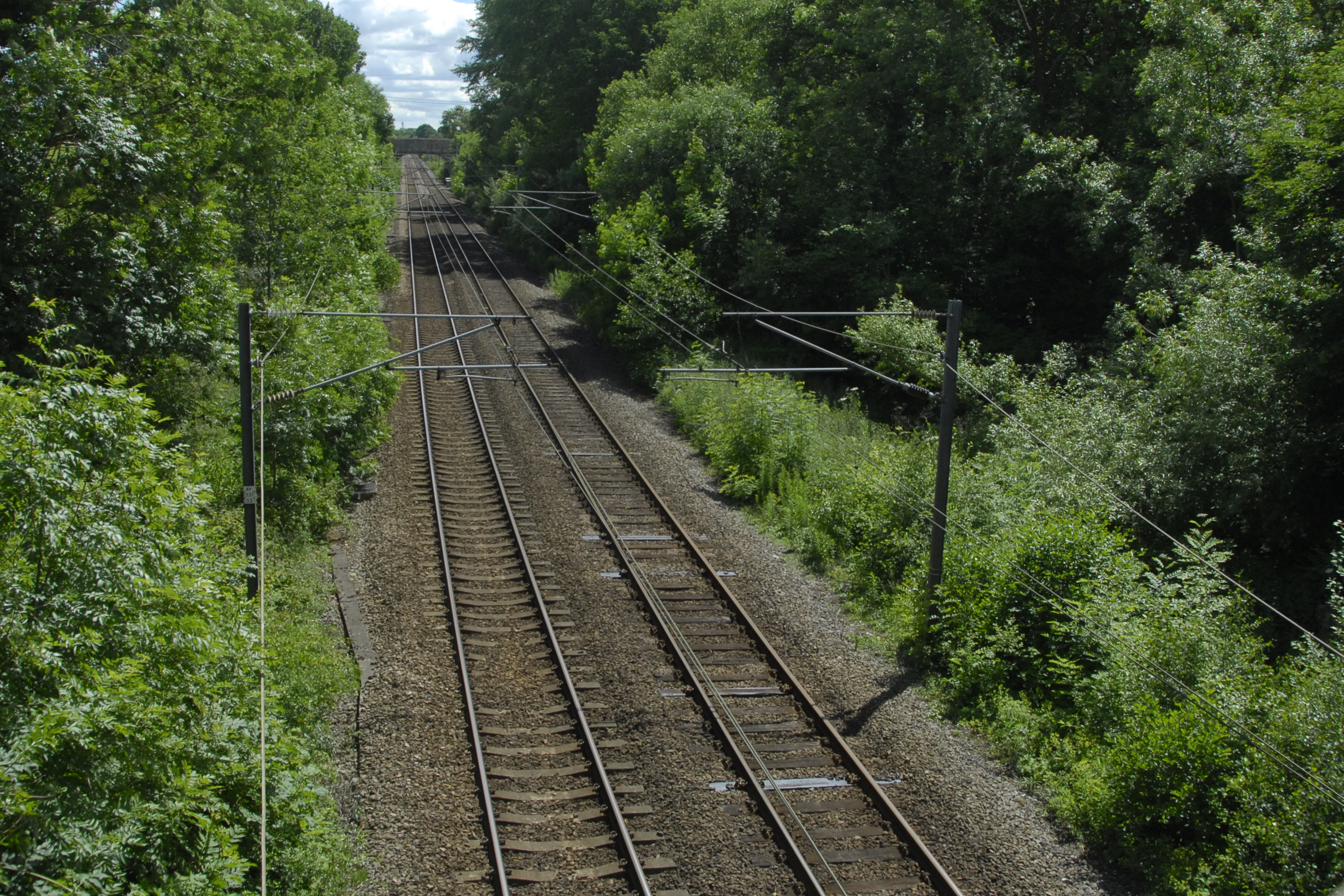
High Royds Hospital Railway junction location in Menston, West Yorkshire; the track curved in on the right and ran under the bridge that the photographer is on

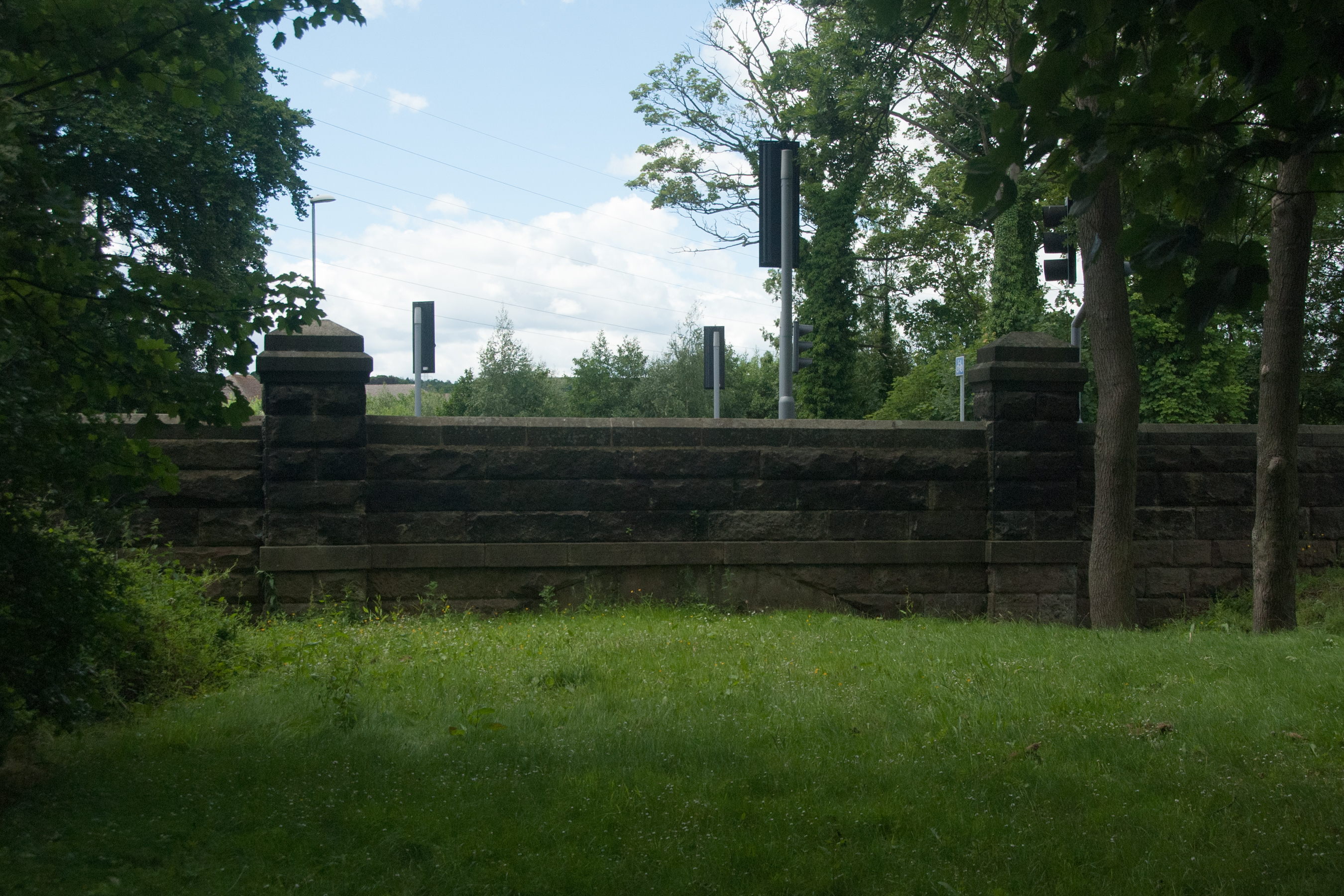
Southern tunnel portal High Royds Hospital Railway; the northern portal image shown in the infobox has been obliterated in an upgraded road scheme

== Sources ==
- Joy, David (1984) [1975]. South and West Yorkshire. A Regional History of the Railways of Great Britain. Vol. 8 (2 ed.). Newton Abbot: David & Charles. ISBN 0-946537-11-9.
- Smith, F. W. & Bairstow, Martin (1992). The Otley and Ilkley Joint Railway. Halifax: Bairstow. ISBN 1-871944-06-6.
